= Pure Speculation =

Multi-genre fan convention in Canada

Pure Speculation Festival
- Status: Active
- Genre: Speculative fiction
- Venue: Ramada Edmonton Hotel & Conference Centre
- Locations: Edmonton, Alberta
- Country: Canada
- Inaugurated: 2005
- Most recent: 2018
- Attendance: 300+ (2009)
- Organizer: Pure Speculation Society
- Filing status: Non-profit
- Website: www.purespec.org

Pure Speculation Festival, also known as Pure Spec, is an annual multi-genre fan convention taking place in Edmonton, Canada. It is an event that prides itself on being "by geeks, for geeks."

== Overview ==
Founded as a speculative fiction convention, Pure Spec repackaged itself as a festival celebrating geek and fan culture in 2008. It offers programming dealing with science fiction, fantasy, pop culture, gaming, anime, comic books and webcomics.

In addition to the usual panels, games and a vendor room, there are several special events the festival hosts every year. The annual Costume Shindig happens on the Saturday of the event, featuring prizes in a variety of silly categories for guests and attendees. The Geeks for Geeks Charity Auction is also a yearly feature, in support of local charities.

Several smaller components also help to create the larger Pure Speculation Festival. These include Con*Spec, a writing and literature segment run by On Spec Magazine, and Comic Talks, a series of comic book panels hosted by Happy Harbor Comics. Until 2007, Pure Spec also played host to Con of Cold, an RPGA sanctioned Dungeons & Dragons event. Edmonton based BioWare also involves itself in the festival yearly, hosting panels and offering prize support.

== History ==
In 2004, a group of friends calling themselves The Four Stooges came together with a common goal. At the time, Edmonton didn't have a major fan convention with the notable exception of Animethon, whose focus is entirely upon anime. They decided to put together a speculative fiction convention to give fans of science fiction and fantasy pop-culture somewhere to gather every year.

The first Pure Speculation Convention took place in October 2005 at the Coast Terrace Inn, and had a decent turnout for a first-time gathering.

After the first event, the realities of organisation made the Four Stooges reach out to find other organisers to help further expand and develop the event. The Pure Speculation Society was founded to better plan and execute the 2006 convention. The festival was also moved to the Delta Edmonton South that year.

The convention was moved to the Hazeldean Community Hall in 2007. The smaller attendance, normal for a young convention, coupled with the high cost for the rental of the Delta made the society reevaluate it as a venue. The show remained at Hazeldean Hall for several years.

In 2008 the event went through its next major evolution, repackaging itself as the Pure Speculation Festival. The focus would now expand to become a celebration of fan culture, and all it encompasses.

In 2009 the decision was made to move the festival to the Shaw Conference Centre in downtown Edmonton, due to swelling attendance and issues with renovation at Hazeldean Hall. In addition to the move, a Friday evening cabaret called Pre Spec was also added to the program of events for the first time. It features an evening of entertainment with many of guests and staff.

Continuing venue issues brought Pure Spec full circle in 2010, when it returned to its first venue, now the Radisson Edmonton South Hotel. Growing attendance encouraged a move Grant MacEwan University in 2011. This would also be the year that Pure Spec attempted to Skype in a guest for a panel.

== Organization ==
Since 2008, Pure Spec has been run by the Pure Speculation Society, a not-for profit society dedicated to planning, organising and running the festival. All proceeds of the event go back into funding it.

Brent Jans acted as Festival Director of Pure Spec for 6 years, starting with the very first event in 2005. Jans decided to step down from the position in 2010.

In 2011 three members of the Pure Speculation Society stepped up to act as co-directors for the festival, to ensure its continuation.

== Local Support ==
Pure Spec has a strong focus toward helping promote local and independent authors, artists and publications in Edmonton, Alberta and Canada. This is an aspect of the festival that the Pure Speculation Society is strongly behind, and will remain a focus of the event into the future.

To that end, many of the festival's guests are drawn from the local independent publishing community, giving them an opportunity to mingle with industry professionals and get their name out.

In addition, proceeds from the Geeks for Geeks Charity Auction go back into the community, helping support a variety of local charities.

== Other Events ==
In addition to the main Pure Speculation Festival, the organising society also hosts Shepherd's Double Feature Picture Shows and Cheapass Fundraisers throughout the year to help raise money for the event.

2011 saw the addition of Mini Spec, a smaller event held in May with one speaker from each of the main panel streams featured in the larger festival.

== Past Festivals ==
Dates	Location	Approx. Attendees	Guests	Theme
October 2005	Coast Terrace Inn	50	Minister Faust, Louis Lavoie	The Last, Best Hope for Geek
October 2006	Delta Edmonton South	50	Richard Barkman, Jim Beveridge, Stephanie Chan, Sissi Chipman, Minister Faust, Barb Galler-Smith, Marie-Claire Gould, Rudi Gunther, Tarol Hunt, Jennifer Kennedy, Ann Marston, Cary Nord, Sean O'Reilly, Kevin Sole, Patrick Weekes, Dean Welsh	Electrum Boogaloo
October 13 & 14, 2007	Hazeldean Community Hall	100	Gilbert Bouchard, Stephanie Chan, Jessica Leigh Clark, Gord Cummings, Steve Gervais, Tarol Hunt, Nick Johnson, Devon Jopling, Orion Kidder, Tim Lasiuta, Jeff Martin, Peter Roccia, Vincent K. Smith, Fiona Staples, Peter Watts, Joanne Wojtysiak	The Search for Spec
October 18 & 19, 2008	Hazeldean Community Hall	250	Robin S. Carson, Stephanie Chan, Tracy Cooper-Posey, Monte Cook, Minister Faust, Barb Galler-Smith, Brian Hades, Jennifer Hepler, Herman Lau, Susan MacGregor, Alina Pete, Steve Rolston, Steven Sadowski, Robert J. Sawyer, Ty Templeton, Diane Walton, Dean Welsh, Sharon Wildwind, Thomas Wharton	Attack of the 50-foot Spec
October 2–4, 2009	Shaw Conference Centre	300	Aaron Acevedo, Doug Barbour, Mark Barrazzuol, Wolfgang Baur, Paul Campbell, Monte Cook, Candas Jane Dorsey, Minister Faust, Barb Galler-Smith, Rick Green, Laurie Greenwood, Barry Hammond, Sherrilyn Jahrig, Dr. Torah Kachur, Susan MacGregor, Alina Pete, Randy Reichardt, Robert Runte, Brittany Trogen, Diane Walton, Sharon Wildwind, Ed Willett	In Spaaaaace!
October 22–24, 2010	Radisson Edmonton South	Estimated 300+	Mark Barrazzuol, Rob Bartel, Greg Bechtel, Eileen Bell, Taylor Bennett, Scott C Bourgeois, Dan Brodribb, Dr. Alexander Carpenter, Rob Carson, Mary Chan, Dr. Gino DiLabio, Candas Jane Dorsey, Minister Faust, Gayleen Froese, Barb Galler-Smith, Judith Graves, Dave Gross, Andrew Hackard, Tanya Huff, Tina Hunter, Melissa Jacques, Maria Jenkins, Liana K, Brent Knowles, Dolores Kohler, Amanda Lim, Susan MacGregor, Ann Marston, Billie Miholland, Beatrice Nearey, Virginia O'Dine, Mike Perschon, Robert J Sawyer, Amber Scott, Jane Starr, Diane Walton, Stanley Woo	2010
November 18–20, 2011	MacEwan University's Robbins Health Centre	Estimated 300+	Wayne Arthurson, Kate Boorman, Scott C Bourgeois, Shen Braun, Vadim Bulitko, Dr. Alexander Carpenter, Robin Carson, Marty Chan, Holly Conrad, Andrew Czarnietzki, Gail deVos, William deVry, Stacey Douglas, Minister Faust, Andrew Foley, Gayleen Froese, Jayne Gackenbach, David Gaider, Barb Galler-Smith, Judith Graves, Dave Gross, Barry Hammond, Amber Hayward, Maria Jenkins, Dr.Torah Kachur, Jason Kapalka, Jennifer Kennedy, Kyle Kulyk, Scott Lilwall, Nicole Luiken, Susan MacGregor, Ann Marston, Jessica Merizan, Billie Milholland, Mike Otto, Mike Perschon, Alina Pete, Samantha Power, Mike Resnick (via Skype), Joel Rivero, Dr. Peter J. Roccia, Adam Rozenhart, Jocelyn Saskiw, Rachelle Saunders, Desiree Schell, Morgan Smith, Gail Sidonie Sobat, Rebecca Staab, Matthew Tang, Diane Walton, Jo Walton, Trent Wilkie, Joe Wos, Spyder Yardley-Jones, Jared Zsombor	Spec to the Future
November 16–18, 2012	MacEwan University's Robbins Health Centre	Estimated 300+	Announced: S. M. Stirling	Night of the Living Spec
November 16–17, 2013	Ramada Edmonton Hotel & Conference Centre	Estimated 300+	Announced: Gail Carriger, Stephen Hunt, Arthur Slade, Liana K, Diana Vick	20,000 Leagues Under the Spec!
June 15-16 2019	Alberta Avenue Community Hall	Not Stated	Krista D. Ball, Candas Jane Dorsey, Sam Maggs and Vanessa Cardui.	Anything

== See also ==
- Fandom
- Gaming convention
- Science fiction convention
