= Trabecula =

Tissue element that supports or anchors a framework of parts within a body or organ

- Alternation of trabecular pattern in the thigh bone reflects mechanical stress

Details
- Part of: Bone

Identifiers
- FMA: 85273

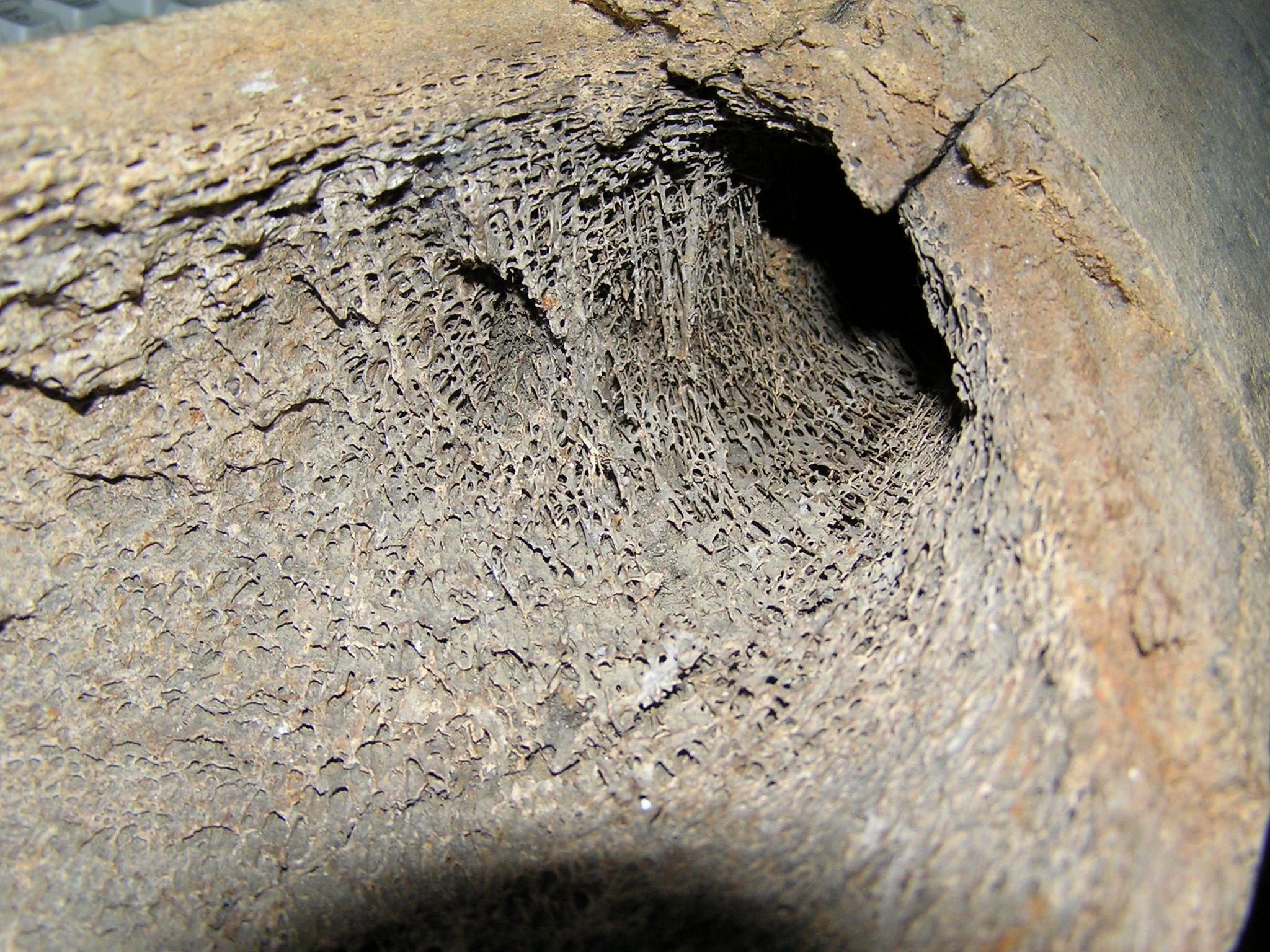
Inside of a bone showing the trabecular structure

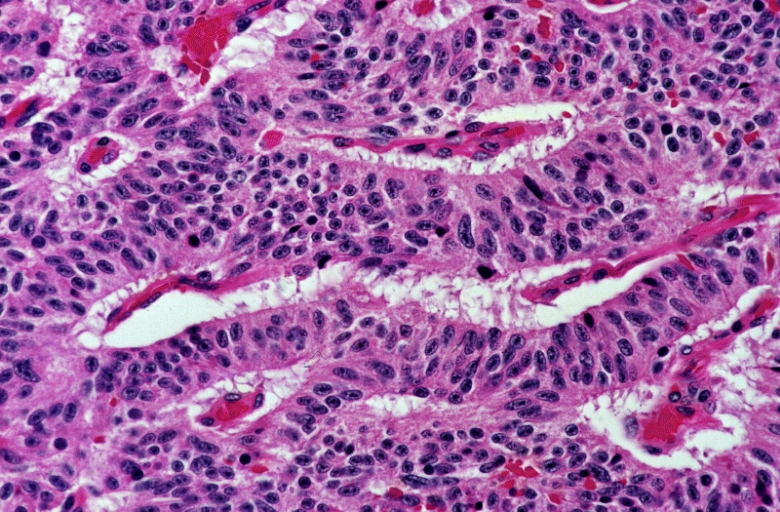
A typical carcinoid tumor of the lung showing a trabecular pattern of elongated groups of cells.

A trabecula (pl.: trabeculae, from Latin for 'small beam') is a small, often microscopic, tissue element in the form of a small beam, strut or rod that supports or anchors a framework of parts within a body or organ. A trabecula generally has a mechanical function, and is usually composed of dense collagenous tissue (such as the trabecula of the spleen). It can be composed of other material such as muscle and bone. In the heart, muscles form trabeculae carneae and septomarginal trabeculae, and the left atrial appendage has a tubular trabeculated structure.

Cancellous bone is formed from groupings of trabeculated bone tissue. In cross section, trabeculae of a cancellous bone can look like septa, but in three dimensions they are topologically distinct, with trabeculae being roughly rod or pillar-shaped and septa being sheet-like.

When crossing fluid-filled spaces, trabeculae may offer the function of resisting tension (as in the penis, see for example trabeculae of corpora cavernosa and trabeculae of corpus spongiosum) or providing a cell filter (as in the trabecular meshwork of the eye).

== Bone trabecula ==
=== Structure ===
Trabecular bone, also called cancellous bone, is porous bone composed of trabeculated bone tissue. It can be found at the ends of long bones like the femur, where the bone is actually not solid but is full of holes connected by thin rods and plates of bone tissue. The holes (the volume not directly occupied by bone trabecula) is the intertrabecular space, and is occupied by red bone marrow, where all the blood cells are made, as well as fibrous tissue. Even though trabecular bone contains a lot of intertrabecular space, its spatial complexity contributes the maximal strength with minimum mass. It is noted that the form and structure of trabecular bone are organized to optimally resist loads imposed by functional activities, like jumping, running and squatting. And according to Wolff's law, proposed in 1892, the external shape and internal architecture of bone are determined by external stresses acting on it. The internal structure of the trabecular bone firstly undergoes adaptive changes along stress direction and then the external shape of cortical bone undergoes secondary changes. Finally bone structure becomes thicker and denser to resist external loading.

Because of the increased occurrence of total joint replacement and its impact on bone remodeling, understanding the stress-related and adaptive process of trabecular bone has become a central concern for bone physiologists. To understand the role of trabecular bone in age-related bone structure and in the design for bone-implant systems, it is important to study the mechanical properties of trabecular bone as a function of variables such as anatomic site, bone density, and age related issues. Mechanical factors including modulus, uniaxial strength, and fatigue properties must be taken into account.

Typically, the porosity percent of trabecular bone is in the range 75–95% and the density ranges from 0.2 to 0.8 g/cm^{3}. It is noted that the porosity can reduce the strength of the bone, but also reduce its weight. The porosity and the manner that porosity is structured affect the strength of material. Thus, the micro structure of trabecular bone is typically oriented and ''grain'' of porosity is aligned in a direction at which mechanical stiffness and strength are greatest. Because of the microstructural directionality, the mechanical properties of trabecular bone are highly anisotropic. The range of Young's modulus for trabecular bone is 800 to 14,000 MPa and the strength of failure is 1 to 100 MPa.

As mentioned above, the mechanical properties of trabecular bone are very sensitive to apparent density. The relationship between modulus of trabecular bone and its apparent density was demonstrated by Carter and Hayes in 1976. The resulting equation states:

$E = a + b\cdot\rho^c$

where $E$ represents the modulus of trabecular bone in any loading direction, $\rho$ represents the apparent density, and $a,$ $b,$ and $c$ are constants depending on the architecture of tissue.

Using scanning electron microscopy, it was found that the variation in trabecular architecture with different anatomic sites lead to different modulus. To understand structure-anisotropy and material property relations, one must correlate the measured mechanical properties of anisotropic trabecular specimens with the stereological descriptions of their architecture.

The compressive strength of trabecular bone is also very important because it is believed that the inside failure of trabecular bone arise from compressive stress. On the stress-strain curves for both trabecular bone and cortical bone with different apparent density, there are three stages in stress-strain curve. The first is the linear region where individual trabecula bend and compress as the bulk tissue is compressed. The second stage occurs after yielding, where trabecular bonds start to fracture, and the final stage is the stiffening stage. Typically, lower density trabecular areas offer more deformed staging before stiffening than higher density specimens.

In summary, trabecular bone is very compliant and heterogeneous. The heterogeneous character makes it difficult to summarize the general mechanical properties for trabecular bone. High porosity makes trabecular bone compliant and large variations in architecture leads to high heterogeneity. The modulus and strength vary inversely with porosity and are highly dependent on the porosity structure. The effects of aging and small cracking of trabecular bone on its mechanical properties are a source of further study.

=== Clinical significance ===
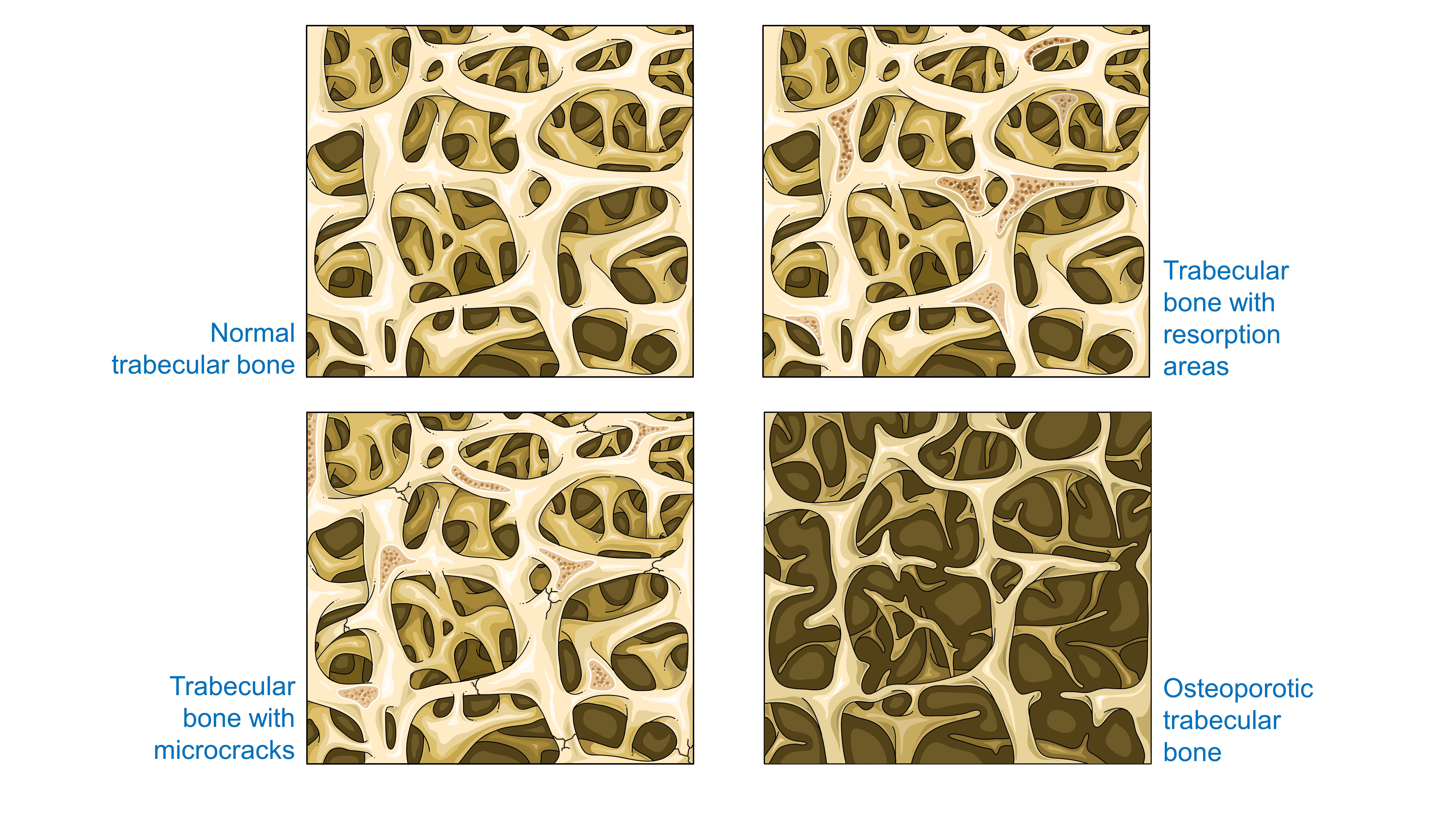
Normal and pathological trabecular bone structures

Studies have shown that once a human reaches adulthood, bone density steadily decreases with age, to which loss of trabecular bone mass is a partial contributor. Loss of bone mass is defined by the World Health Organization as osteopenia if bone mineral density (BMD) is one standard deviation below mean BMD in young adults, and is defined as osteoporosis if it is more than 2.5 standard deviations below the mean. A low bone density greatly increases risk for stress fracture, which can occur without warning. The resulting low-impact fractures from osteoporosis most commonly occur in the upper femur, which consists of 25-50% trabecular bone depending on the region, in the vertebrae, which are about 90% trabecular, or in the wrist.

When trabecular bone volume decreases, its original plate-and-rod structure is disturbed; plate-like structures are converted to rod-like structures and pre-existing rod-like structures thin until they disconnect and resorb into the body. Changes in trabecular bone are typically gender-specific, with the most notable differences in bone mass and trabecular microstructure occurring within the age range for menopause. Trabeculae degradation over time causes a decrease in bone strength that is disproportionately large in comparison to volume of trabecular bone loss, leaving the remaining bone vulnerable to fracture.

With osteoporosis there are often also symptoms of osteoarthritis, which occurs when cartilage in joints is under excessive stress and degrades over time, causing stiffness, pain, and loss of movement. With osteoarthritis, the underlying bone plays a significant role in cartilage degradation. Thus any trabecular degradation can significantly affect stress distribution and adversely affect the cartilage in question.

Due to its strong effect on overall bone strength, there is currently strong speculation that analysis in patterns of trabeculae degradation may be useful in the near future in tracking the progression of osteoporosis.

=== Birds ===
The hollow design of bird bones is multifunctional. It establishes high specific strength and supplements open airways to accommodate the skeletal pneumaticity common to many birds. The specific strength and resistance to buckling is optimized through a bone design that combines a thin, hard shell that encases a spongy core of trabeculae. The allometry of the trabeculae allows the skeleton to tolerate loads without significantly increasing the bone mass. The red-tailed hawk optimizes its weight with a repeating pattern of V-shaped struts that give the bones the necessary lightweight and stiff characteristics. The inner network of trabeculae shifts mass away from the neutral axis, which ultimately increases the resistance to buckling.

As in humans, the distribution of trabeculae in bird species is uneven and is dependent on load conditions. The bird with the highest density of trabeculae is the kiwi, a flightless bird. There is also uneven distribution of trabeculae within similar species such as the great spotted woodpecker or grey-headed woodpecker. After examining a microCT scan of the woodpecker's forehead, temporomandibulum, and occiput it was determined that there is significantly more trabeculae in the forehead and occiput. Besides the difference in distribution, the aspect ratio of the individual struts was higher in woodpeckers than in other birds of similar size such as the Eurasian hoopoe or the lark. The woodpeckers' trabeculae are more plate-like while the hawk and lark have rod-like structures networked through their bones. The decrease in strain on the woodpecker's brain has been attributed to the higher quantity of thicker plate-like struts packed more closely together than the hawk or hoopoe or the lark. Conversely, the thinner rod-like structures would lead to greater deformation. A destructive mechanical test with 12 samples show the woodpecker's trabeculae design has an average ultimate strength of 6.38MPa, compared to the lark's 0.55MPa.

Woodpeckers' beaks have tiny struts supporting the shell of the beak, but to a lesser extent compared to the skull. As a result of fewer trabeculae in the beak, the beak has a higher stiffness (1.0 GPa) compared to the skull (0.31 GPa). While the beak absorbs some of the impact from pecking, most of the impact is transferred to the skull where more trabeculae are actively available to absorb the shock. The ultimate strength of woodpeckers' and larks' beaks are similar, inferring the beak has a lesser role in impact absorption. One measured advantage of the woodpecker's beak is the slight overbite (upper beak is 1.6mm longer than lower beak) which offers a bimodal distribution of force due to the asymmetric surface contact. The staggered timing of impact induces a lower strain on the trabeculae in the forehead, occiput, and beak.

=== Trabecula in other organisms ===
The larger the animal, the higher the load forces on its bones. Trabecular bone increases stiffness by increasing the amount of bone per unit volume or by altering the geometry and arrangement of individual trabeculae as body size and bone loading increases. Trabecular bone scales allometrically, reorganizing the bones' internal structure to increase the ability of the skeleton to sustain loads experienced by the trabeculae. Furthermore, scaling of trabecular geometry can moderate trabecular strain. Load acts as a stimulus to the trabecular, changing its geometry so as to sustain or mitigate strain loads. By using finite element modelling, a study tested four different species under an equal apparent stress (σapp) to show that trabecular scaling in animals alters the strain within the trabecular. It was observed that the strain within trabeculae from each species varied with the geometry of the trabeculae. From a scale of tens of micrometers, which is approximately the size of osteocytes, the figure below shows that thicker trabeculae exhibited less strain. The relative frequency distributions of element strain experienced by each species shows a higher elastic moduli of the trabeculae as the species size increases.

Additionally, trabeculae in larger animals are thicker, further apart, and less densely connected than those in smaller animals. Intra-trabecular osteon can commonly be found in thick trabeculae of larger animals, as well as thinner trabeculae of smaller animals such as cheetah and lemurs. The osteons play a role in the diffusion of nutrients and waste products of osteocytes by regulating the distance between osteocytes and bone surface to approximately 230 μm.

Due to an increased reduction of blood oxygen saturation, animals with high metabolic demands tend to have a lower trabecular thickness (Tb.Th) because they require increased vascular perfusion of trabeculae. The vascularization by tunneling osteons changes the trabecular geometry from solid to tube-like, increasing bending stiffness for individual trabeculae and sustaining blood supply to deep tissue osteocytes.

Bone volume fraction (BV/TV) was found to be relatively constant for the variety of animal sizes tested. Larger animals did not show a significantly larger mass per unit volume of trabecular bone. This may be due to an adaptation which reduces the physiological cost of producing, maintaining, and moving tissue. However, BV/TV showed significant positive scaling in avian femoral condyles. Larger birds present decreased flight habits due to avian BV/TV allometry. The flightless kiwi, weighing only 1–2 kg, had the greatest BV/TV of the birds tested in the study. This shows that trabecular bone geometry is related to 'prevailing mechanical conditions', so the differences in trabecular geometry in the femoral head and condyle could be attributed to different loading environments of coxofemoral and femorotibial joints.

The woodpecker's ability to resist repetitive head impact is correlated with its unique micro/nano-hierarchical composite structures. Microstructure and nanostructure of the woodpecker's skull consists of an uneven distribution of spongy bone, the organizational shape of individual trabeculae. This affects the woodpecker's mechanical properties, allowing the cranial bone to withstand a high ultimate strength (σu). Compared to the cranial bone of the lark, the woodpecker's cranial bone is denser and less spongy, having a more plate-like structure rather than the more rod-like structure observed in larks. Furthermore, the woodpecker's cranial bone is thicker and more individual trabeculae. Relative to the trabeculae in lark, the woodpecker's trabecular is more closely spaced and more plate-like. These properties result in higher ultimate strength in the cranial bone of the woodpecker.

== History ==
The diminutive form of Latin trabs, means a beam or bar. In the 19th century, the neologism trabeculum (with an assumed plural of trabecula) became popular, but is less etymologically correct. Trabeculum persists in some countries as a synonym for the trabecular meshwork of the eye, but this can be considered poor usage on the grounds of both etymology and descriptive accuracy.

== Other uses ==
For the skull development component, see trabecular cartilage.

== See also ==
- Arachnoid trabeculae
