= Ettin (disambiguation) =

An Ettin is a type of being in Germanic mythology. Ettin may also refer to:

- Bogle (also called Ettin), a malevolent creature in Northumbrian folklore
- Ettin (Dungeons & Dragons), a two-headed giant
- Ettins, a species in the Creatures series of computer games
- Ettin, a two-headed giant humanoid character in the Three Thieves graphic novel series

== See also ==
- Hind Etin
- The Red Ettin
