= Gisèle Lagacé =

Canadian cartoonist

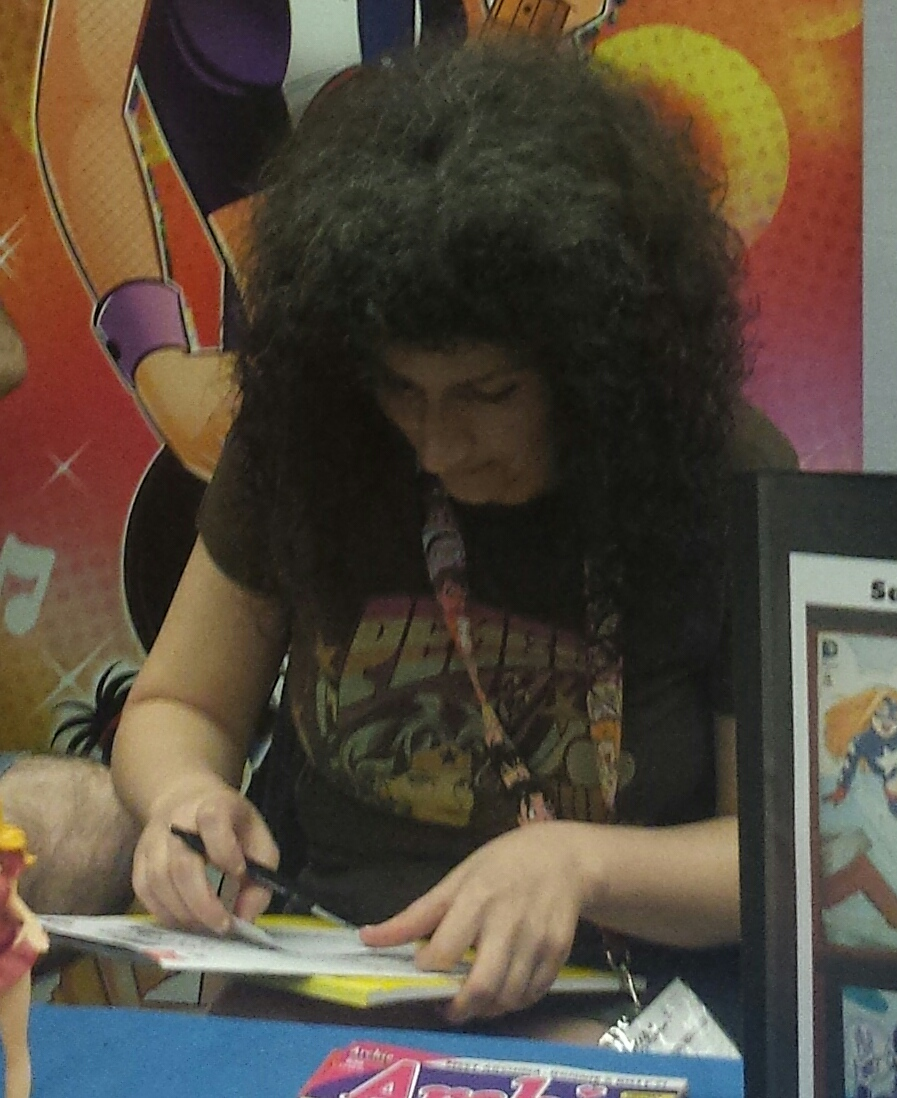
- Lagacé at the Montreal Comiccon, 2016.
- Born: June 16, 1970 (age 56) New Brunswick, Canada
- Areas: Cartoonist, Writer, Penciller, Artist, Inker, Editor, Publisher
- Notable works: Ménage à 3 Archie
- Collaborators: David Lumsdon
- Awards: 2001 Web Cartoonists' Choice Awards - Best Art; 2002 Kimberly Yale Award - Best New Talent; 2018 Joe Shuster Award - Webcomics Creator

Gisèle Lagacé (born June 16, 1970, in New Brunswick, Canada) is a Canadian comics writer and artist, writer and illustrator of webcomics. She is best known for her series Ménage à 3.

== Biography ==
Lagacé was born in 1970 in New Brunswick, Canada. She attended high school at l'ESN in Bathurst, New Brunswick, and studied visual arts for a year at Université de Moncton before graduating in graphic design from La Cité collégiale in Ottawa.

She was a bassist for the Quebec all-female band Barbarella in the early 1990s, then worked as a graphic designer.

In 2017, Lagacé was traveling to attend the Chicago Comic & Entertainment Expo and was denied entry to the United States at the Canadian Border.

== Works ==
In 2000, she wrote and illustrated the webcomic Cool Cat Studio which quickly became popular in 2001 and won the Web Cartoonists' Choice Awards for best art. That led to the 2002 co-winning of the Kimberly Yale Award for Best New Talent.

From 2004 to 2009, she worked with writer T Campbell to co-create the Penny and Aggie series about the rivalry of two girls and their friends. Lagacé was nominated in the 2007 Web Cartoonists' Choice Awards for Outstanding Romantic Comic.

In 2008, she created with writer David Lumsdon the series strip Ménage à 3 (meaning "threesome"/"love triangle" or "three person household") which tells a sex comedy story similar to television show Three's Company. The strip was consistently in the top 50 rated webcomics and ended in 2019. Lagacé was also nominated for the Joe Shuster Award for Outstanding Webcomics Creator. Lagacé was invited to the 2008 Anime Festival in Montreal. In 2018, Ménage à 3 won the Joe Shuster Award for "Webcomics Creator".

In 2009, she created the series Eerie Cuties which tells the story of high school monsters. David Lumsdon later joined as co-writer. In January 2013, she created a spinoff of Ménage à 3, called Sticky Dilly Buns.

Lagacé has penciled Archie Comics, and also illustrated the Ramones-themed one-shot, Archie Meets Ramones, in 2016.

She drew a Betty Boop mini series for Dynamite Entertainment in 2016, and issues #24-26 of Jem and the Holograms from IDW Publishing. She illustrated the covers of the Marvel Comics series Unbelievable Gwenpool for issues #12 and #13 from February to March 2015, and is the artist of Exorsisters, an ongoing series from Image Comics written by Ian Boothby.
