= Ménage à 3 (webcomic) =

Webcomic

- Cover of Ménage à 3 Volume 1 with Didi, Zii, Gary & Lita
- Author(s): Gisèle Lagacé & David Lumsdon
- Website: Ma3comic.com
- Launch date: May 16, 2008
- End date: April 9, 2019
- Genre: Sex comedy

Ménage à 3 is a webcomic by Gisèle Lagacé and David Lumsdon. The comic ran from 2008 to 2019.

== Premise ==
Ménage à 3 is set in Montreal and centres on Gary, who initially is a virgin with little social life and a large pornography collection. After his two roommates Dillon and Matt move out, they are replaced by two women: Zii, a pansexual punk rocker with no sense of boundaries, and Didi, a naive francophone. Zii decides to help find Gary someone to lose his virginity with. Other characters include Sonya, who insists she isn't a lesbian even while having sex with women, and Yuki who has phallophobia.

Ménage à 3 is a sex comedy initially drawing from harem manga, with misunderstandings and slapstick. The comic features explicit discussions of sex acts and depictions of bare breasts and panty shots.

== Reception ==
Ménage à 3 won its creators the 2018 Joe Shuster Award, a Canadian comics award, for "Webcomics Creator / Créateur de Bandes Dessinées Web". It was also nominated in 2009 and 2010.

In 2008, Ménage à 3 was the thirteenth most popular webcomic among those comics that used the Project Wonderful ad-serving system.

Reviewing the comic for ComicsAlliance, Lauren Davis felt that the first year or so of strips were "a bit one-note" and "banal", leaning heavily on the "sexy shenanigans". But Davis felt that over time the comic grew and developed a suitable rhythm for its stories. Davis called Lagacé's artwork "simply gorgeous; her grasp of anatomy makes a comic where people are constantly taking off their clothes a natural fit."
