= Erection =

Physiological phenomenon involving the hardening and enlargement of the penis

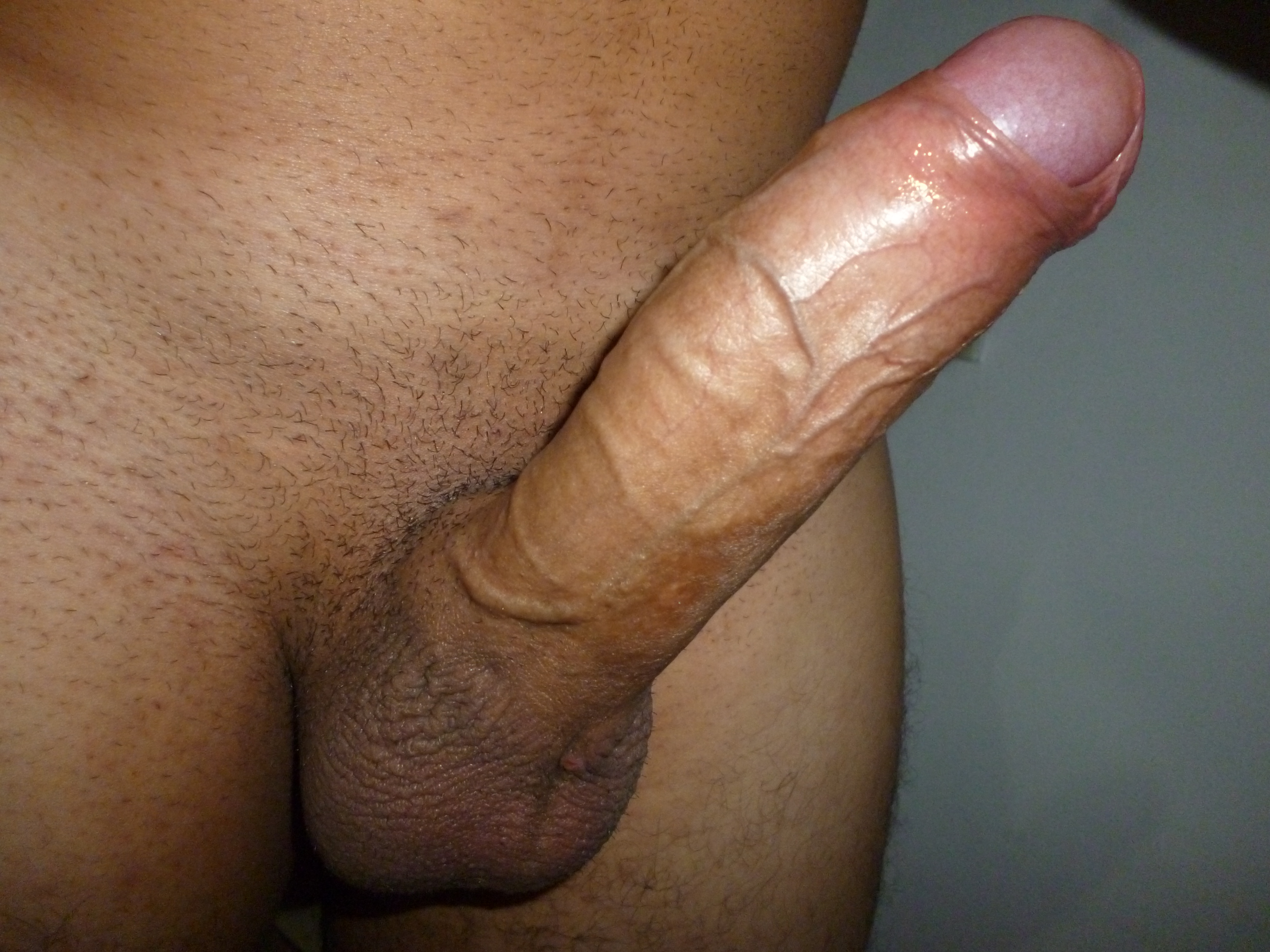
- Erection of an uncircumcised male human

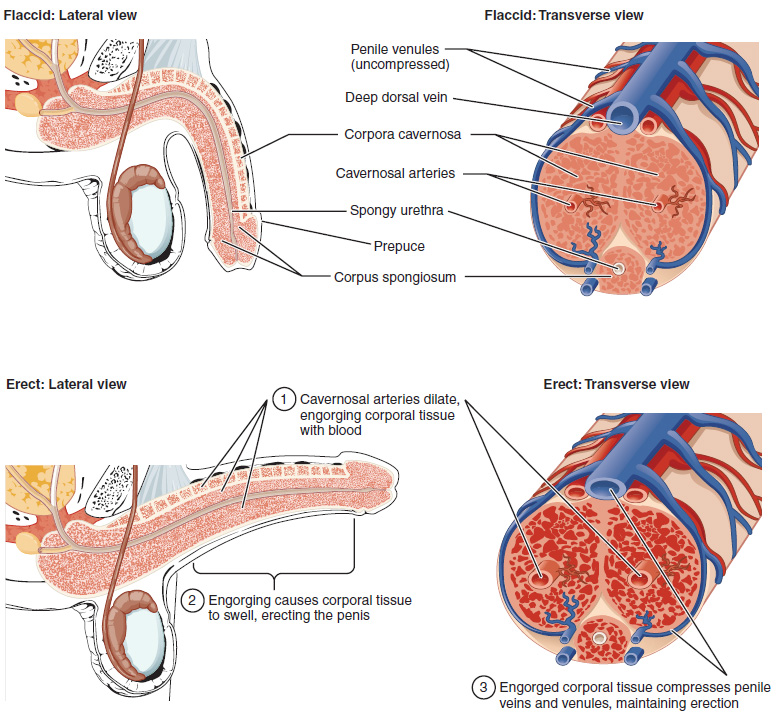
- Three columns of erectile tissue make up most of the volume of the penis.

Identifiers
- MeSH: D010410
- TE: E1.0.0.0.0.0.8

Erection blood vessels

Identifiers
- MeSH: D010410
- TE: E1.0.0.0.0.0.8

An erection (clinically: penile erection or penile tumescence) is a physiological phenomenon in which the penis becomes firm, engorged, and enlarged. Penile erection is the result of a complex interaction of psychological, neural, vascular, and endocrine factors, and is often associated with sexual arousal, sexual attraction or libido, although erections can also be spontaneous. The shape, angle, and direction of an erection vary considerably between humans.

Physiologically, an erection is required for a male to effect penetration or sexual intercourse and is triggered by the parasympathetic division of the autonomic nervous system, causing the levels of nitric oxide (a vasodilator) to rise in the trabecular arteries and smooth muscle of the penis. The arteries dilate causing the corpora cavernosa of the penis (and to a lesser extent the corpus spongiosum) to fill with blood; simultaneously the ischiocavernosus and bulbospongiosus muscles compress the veins of the corpora cavernosa restricting the egress and circulation of this blood. Erection subsides when parasympathetic activity reduces to baseline.

As an autonomic nervous system response, an erection may result from a variety of stimuli, including sexual stimulation and sexual arousal, and is therefore not entirely under conscious control. Erections during sleep or upon waking up are known as nocturnal penile tumescence (NPT), also known as "morning wood". Absence of nocturnal erection is commonly used to distinguish between physical and psychological causes of erectile dysfunction and impotence.

The state of a penis which is partly, but not fully, erect is sometimes known as semi-erection (clinically: partial tumescence); a penis which is not erect is typically referred to as being flaccid, or soft.

== Physiology ==
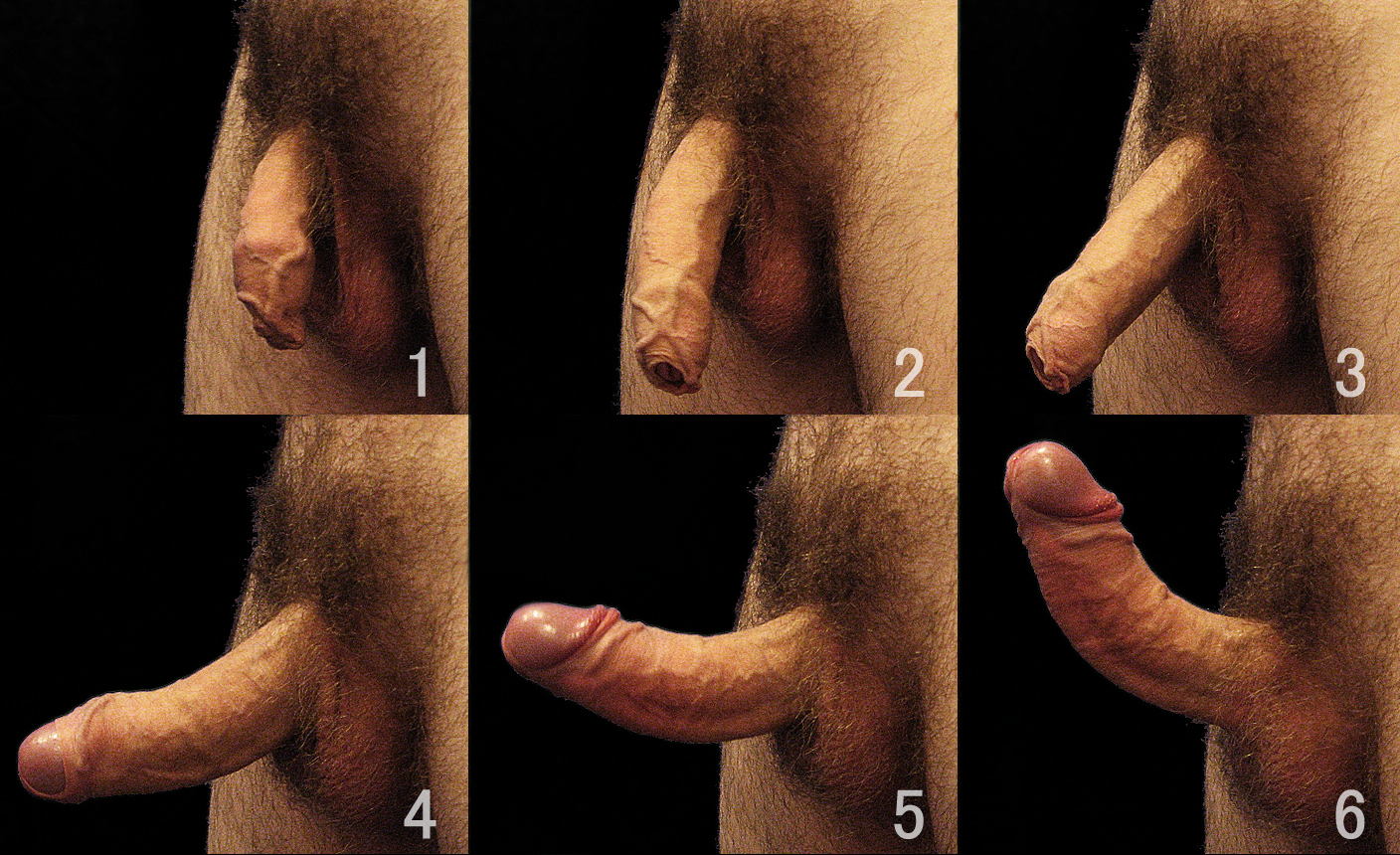
Stages of an erection on a penis with Peyronie's disease

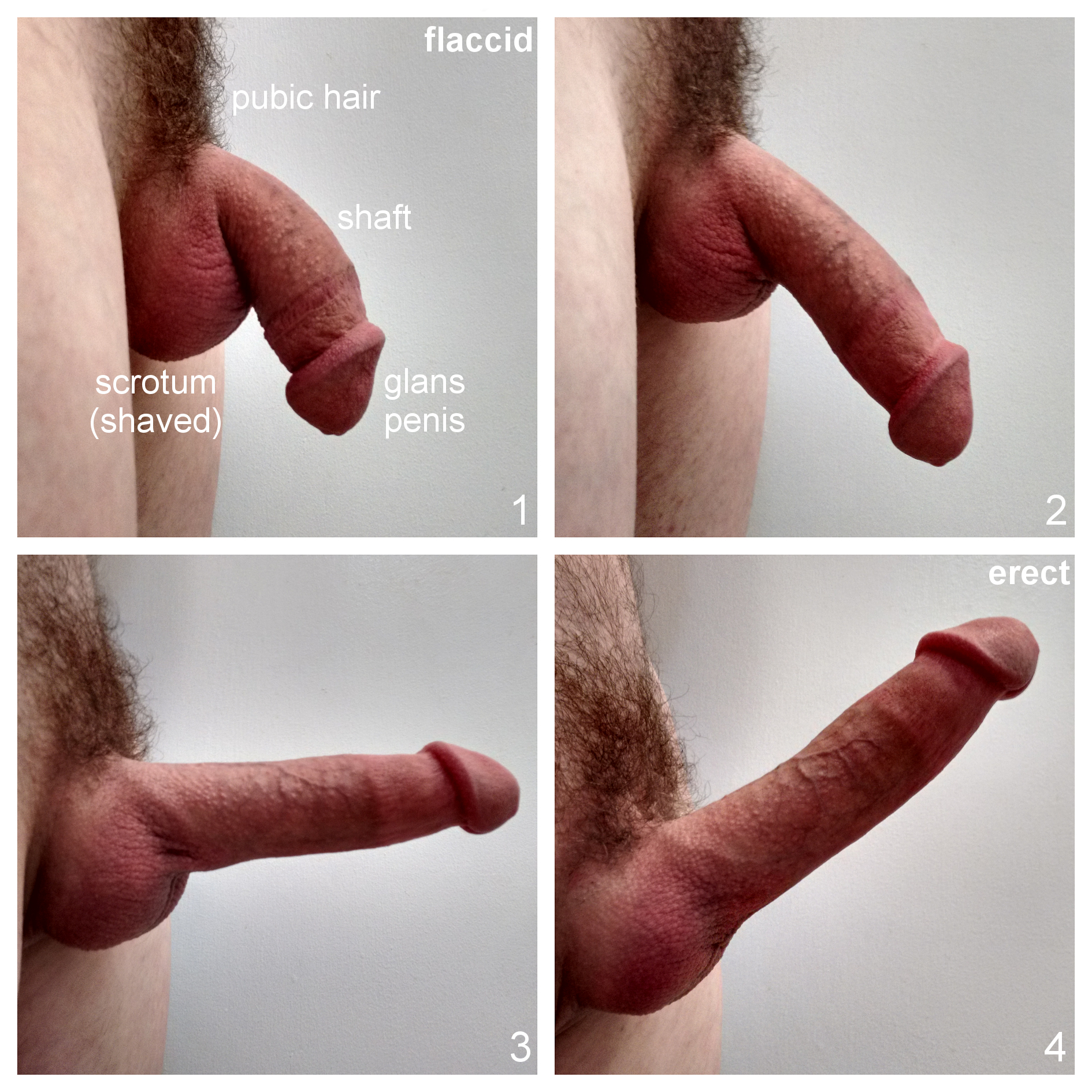
Stages of an erection on a circumcised penis

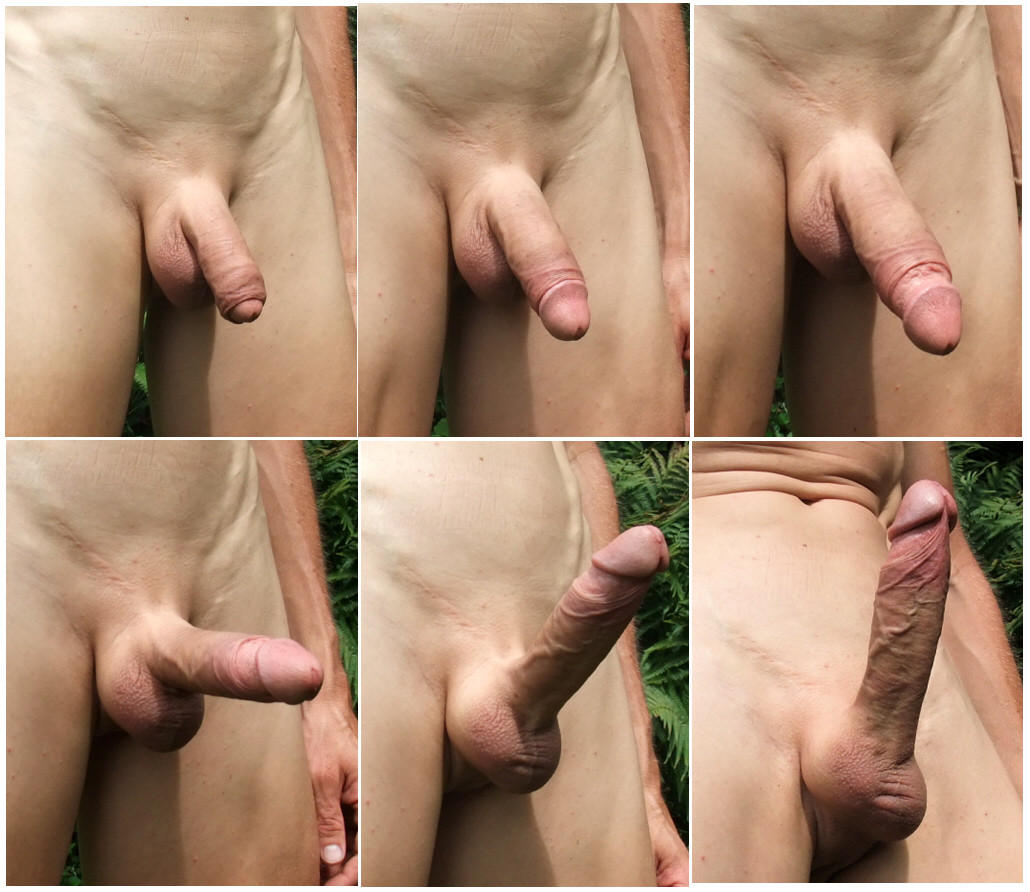
Stages of an erection on an uncircumcised penis

An erection is necessary for natural insemination as well as for the harvesting of sperm for artificial insemination, and is common for children and infants. After reaching puberty, erections occur much more frequently. An erection occurs when two tubular structures, called the corpora cavernosa, that run the length of the penis, become engorged with venous blood. This may result from any of various physiological stimuli, also known as sexual stimulation and sexual arousal. The corpus spongiosum is a single tubular structure located just below the corpora cavernosa, which contains the urethra, through which urine and semen pass during urination and ejaculation respectively. This may also become slightly engorged with blood, but less so than the corpora cavernosa. In some cases, the scrotum becomes tightened during an erection.

In most uncircumcised adult males, the foreskin automatically and gradually retracts throughout the various stages of erection, exposing the glans, though some individuals need to manually retract their foreskin. At birth, the foreskin remains fused to the glans and gradually separates from accumulation of smegma and periodic erections. 90% of 3-year-old boys experience some level of foreskin retraction, although most penises at this age retain some level of adhesion between the foreskin and glans. This increases to 92% among 6-year-old boys, 99% among 16-year-old boys, and nearly 100% of adult males.

=== Autonomic control ===
In the presence of mechanical stimulation, erection is initiated by the parasympathetic division of the autonomic nervous system with minimal input from the central nervous system. Parasympathetic branches extend from the sacral plexus into the arteries supplying the erectile tissue; upon stimulation, these nerve branches release acetylcholine, which in turn causes the release of nitric oxide from endothelial cells in the trabecular arteries. Nitric oxide diffuses to the smooth muscle of the arteries (called trabecular smooth muscle), acting as a vasodilating agent. The arteries dilate, filling the corpus spongiosum and corpora cavernosa with blood. The ischiocavernosus and bulbospongiosus muscles also compress the veins of the corpora cavernosa, limiting the venous drainage of blood. Erection subsides when parasympathetic stimulation is discontinued; baseline stimulation from the sympathetic division of the autonomic nervous system causes constriction of the penile arteries and cavernosal sinusoids, forcing blood out of the erectile tissue through erection-related veins which include one deep dorsal vein, a pair of cavernosal veins, and two pairs of para-arterial veins between Buck's fascia and the tunica albuginea. Erection rigidity is mechanically controlled by reduction blood flow through theses veins, and thereby building up the pressure of the corpus cavernosum and corpus spongiosum, an integral instructure, the distal ligament, buttresses the glans penis.

After ejaculation or cessation of stimulation, erection usually subsides, but the time taken may vary depending on the length and thickness of the penis.

=== Voluntary and involuntary control ===
The cerebral cortex can initiate erection in the absence of direct mechanical stimulation (in response to visual, auditory, olfactory, imagined, or tactile stimuli) acting through erectile centers in the lumbar and sacral regions of the spinal cord. The cortex may suppress erection, even in the presence of mechanical stimulation, as may other psychological, emotional, and environmental factors.

=== Nocturnal erection ===
The penis may become erect during sleep or be erect on waking up. Such an erection is medically known as nocturnal penile tumescence (informally: morning wood or morning glory).

== Socio-sexual aspects ==
=== Social ===
Though an erection can have many causes, it is most commonly seen as an indicator of sexual arousal and is therefore considered taboo or inappropriate for a public setting in many societies. This taboo is lesser than that surrounding public sex but higher than that surrounding nudity. Erectile dysfunction is often considered a flaw, eliciting shame in individuals affected.

The penile plethysmograph, which measures erections, has been used by some governments and courts of law to measure sexual orientation. An unusual aversion to the erect penis is sometimes referred to as phallophobia.

=== Spontaneous or random erections ===
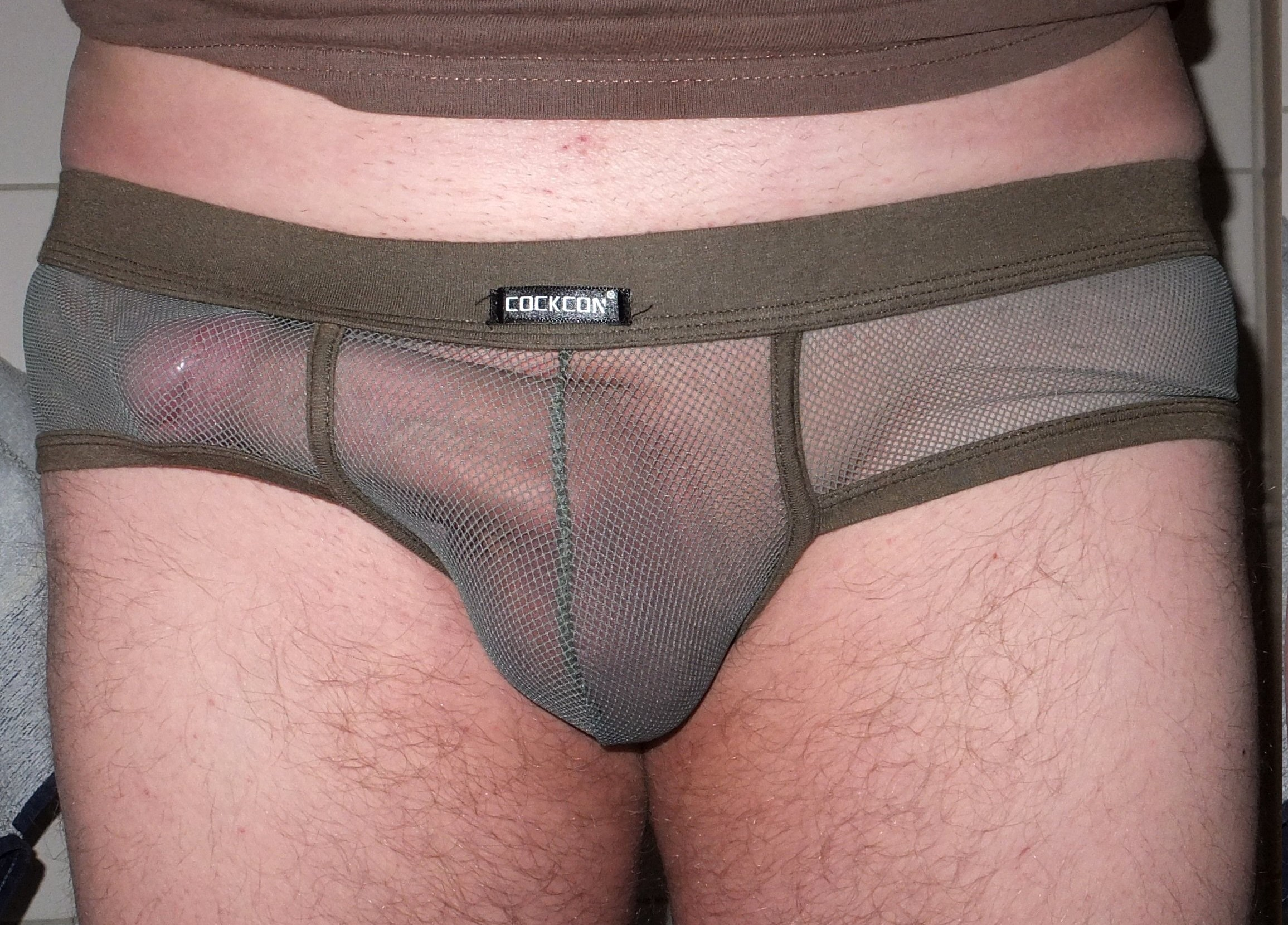
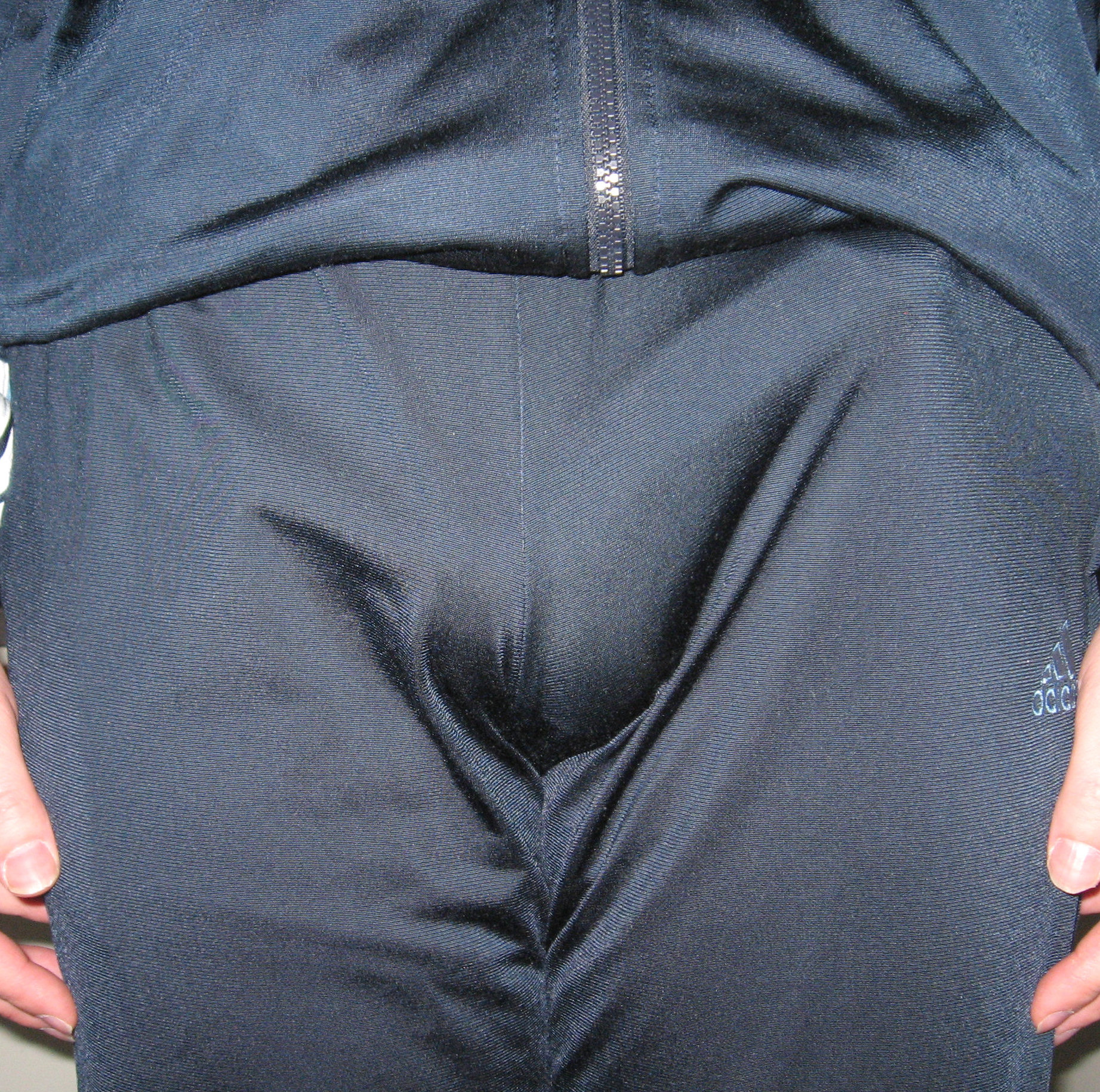
Erection visible beneath clothing

Spontaneous erections, also known as involuntary, random or unwanted erections, are commonplace and a normal part of male physiology. Socially, such erections can be embarrassing if they happen in public or when undesired. Such erections can occur at any time of day, and if clothed may cause a bulge which (if required) can be disguised or hidden by wearing close-fitting underwear, a long shirt, or baggier clothes.

=== Size ===
The length of the flaccid penis is not indicative of the length of the penis when it becomes erect, with some smaller flaccid penises growing much longer, and some larger flaccid penises growing comparatively less. Generally, the size of an erect penis is fixed throughout post-pubescent life. Its size may be increased by surgery.

Though the size of a penis varies considerably between males, the average length of an erect human penis is 13.12 cm (5.17 inches), while the average circumference of an erect human penis is 11.66 cm (4.59 inches).

=== Direction ===
Although many erect penises point upwards, it is common and normal for the erect penis to point nearly vertically upwards or horizontally straight forward or even nearly vertically downwards, all depending on the tension of the suspensory ligament that holds it in position. An erect penis can also take on a number of different shapes, ranging from a straight tube to a tube with a curvature up or down or to the left or right. An increase in penile curvature can be caused by Peyronie's disease. This may cause physical and psychological effects for the affected individual, which could include erectile dysfunction or pain during an erection. Treatments include medication or surgery, the latter of which is most often performed only as a last resort. The following table shows how common various erection angles are for a standing male. In the table, zero degrees (0°) is pointing straight up against the abdomen, 90° is horizontal and pointing straight forward, and 180° is pointing straight down to the feet. An upward pointing angle is most common and the average erection angle is 74.3 degrees. The penile curvature was measured same time. 63% men have straight penis. 22.2% men have upwards curvature and 14.8% men have downwards curvature.

Occurrence of erection angles
Angle (°)	Percent of population
0–30	4.9
30–60	29.6
60–85	30.9
85–95	9.9
95–120	19.8
120–180	4.9

== Medical conditions ==
=== Erectile dysfunction ===
Erectile dysfunction (also known as ED or "(male) impotence") is a sexual dysfunction characterized by the inability to develop and/or maintain an erection. The study of erectile dysfunction within medicine is known as andrology, a sub-field within urology.

Erectile dysfunction may occur due to physiological or psychological reasons, most of which are amenable to treatment. Common physiological reasons include diabetes, kidney disease, chronic alcoholism, multiple sclerosis, atherosclerosis, vascular disease, including arterial insufficiency and venogenic erectile dysfunction, and neurologic disease which collectively account for about 70% of ED cases. Some drugs used to treat other conditions, such as lithium and paroxetine, may cause erectile dysfunction.

Erectile dysfunction, tied closely as it is to cultural notions of potency, success and masculinity, can have devastating psychological consequences including feelings of shame, loss or inadequacy. There is a strong culture of silence and inability to discuss the matter. Around one in ten men experience recurring impotence problems at some point in their lives.

=== Priapism ===
Priapism is a painful condition in which the penis does not return to its flaccid state, despite the absence of both physical and psychological stimulation. Priapism lasting over four hours is a medical emergency.

=== Hard flaccid syndrome ===
Hard flaccid syndrome is a rare, chronic condition characterized by a flaccid penis that remains in a firm, semi-rigid or semi-erect state in the absence of sexual arousal.

== Other animals ==
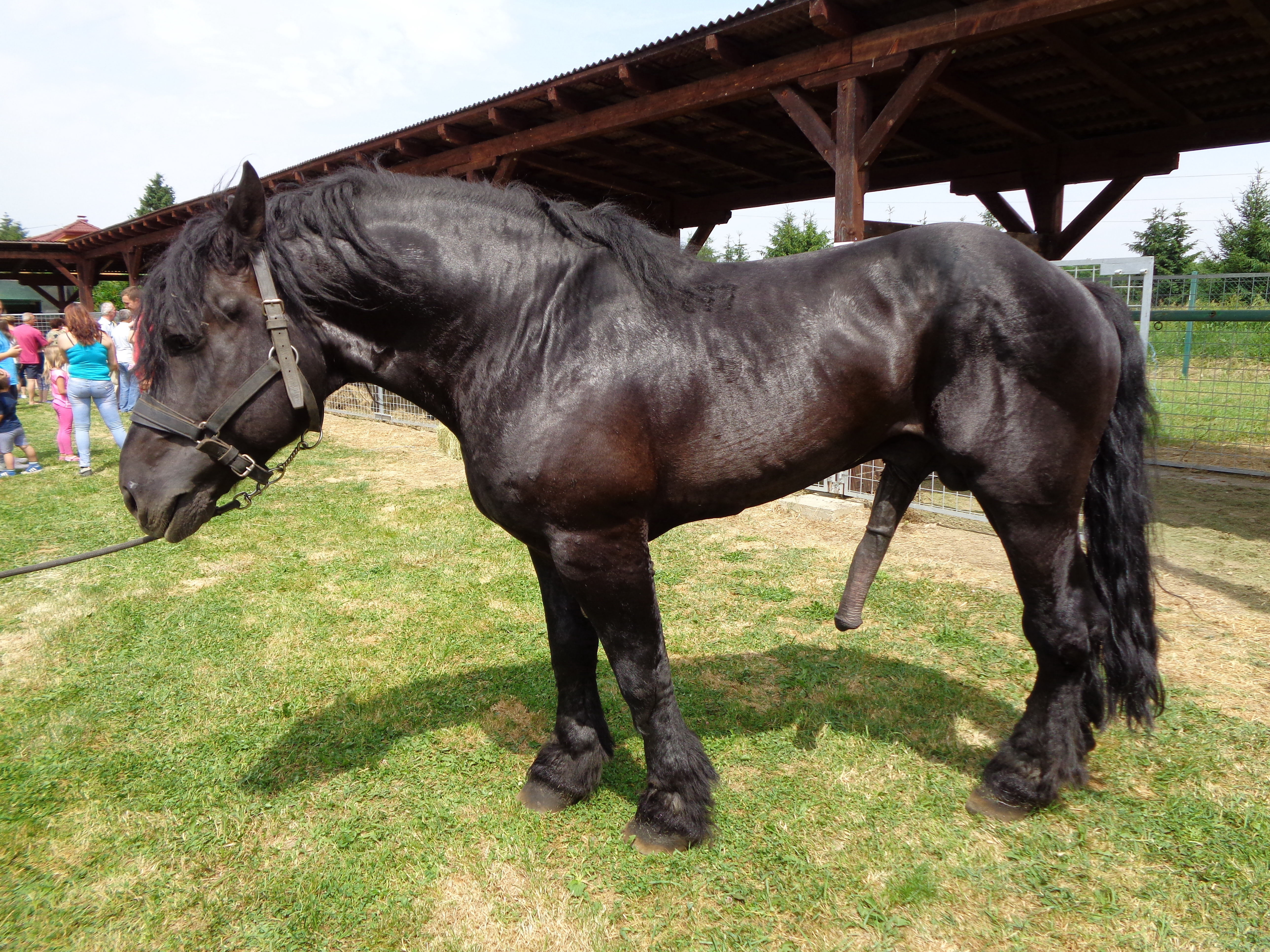
A stallion with an erect penis

At the time of penetration, the canine penis is not erect, and only able to penetrate the female because it includes a narrow bone called the baculum, a feature of most placental mammals. After the male achieves penetration, he will often hold the female tighter and thrust faster, and it is during this time that the male's penis expands, unlike human sexual intercourse, where the male penis commonly becomes erect before entering the female.

An elephant's penis is S-shaped when fully erect and has a Y-shaped orifice.

Given the small amount of erectile tissue in a bull's penis, there is little enlargement after erection. The penis is quite rigid when non-erect, and becomes even more rigid during erection. Protrusion is not affected much by erection, but more by relaxation of the retractor penis muscle and straightening of the sigmoid flexure.

A male fossa's penis reaches to between his forelegs when erect.

When not erect, a horse's penis is housed within the prepuce, 50 centimetres (20 in) long and 2.5 to 6 centimetres (1 to 2.5 in) in diameter with the distal end 15 to 20 centimetres (6 to 8 in). The retractor muscle contracts to retract the penis into the sheath and relaxes to allow the penis to extend from the sheath. When erect, the penis doubles in length and thickness and the glans increases by 3 to 4 times. Erection and protrusion take place gradually, by the increasing tumescence of the erectile vascular tissue in the corpus cavernosum penis. Most stallions achieve erection within 2 minutes of contact with an estrus mare, and mount the estrus mare 5–10 seconds afterward.

A bird penis is different in structure from mammal penises, being an erectile expansion of the cloacal wall and being erected by lymph, not blood. The penis of the lake duck can reach about the same length as the animal himself when fully erect, but more commonly is about half the bird's length.

== Terminology ==
Clinically, erection is often known as "penile erection", and the state of being erect, and process of erection, are described as "tumescence" or "penile tumescence". The term for the subsiding or cessation of an erection is "detumescence".

Colloquially and in slang, erection is known by many informal terms. Commonly encountered English terms include 'stiffy', 'hard-on', 'boner' and 'woody'. There are several slang words, euphemisms and synonyms for an erection in English and in other languages. (See more at Wiktionary's Thesaurus entry.)

== See also ==
- Clitoral erection
- Cock ring
- Death erection
- Human penis
- Issues in social nudity
- Nipple stimulation
- Priapism
- Sexual function
