= MA3 =

MA3 or Ma3 or MA-3 may refer to:

- Massachusetts Route 3
- U.S. Route 3 in Massachusetts
- The abbreviation for Massachusetts's 3rd congressional district
- Ménage à 3 (webcomic), a webcomic published since 2008
- HD Radio's all-digital AM modes
- Mercury-Atlas 3, a test flight of Project Mercury
