= Julie Rocheleau =

Julie Rocheleau may refer to

- Julie Baumann (born 1964) née Rocheleau, Canadian-born Swiss athlete
- Julie Rocheleau (artist) (born 1983) graphic novel artist and illustrator in Quebec, Canada
