= Three Thieves =

Three Thieves may refer to:

- Three Thieves (1966 film), an Egyptian film
- Three Thieves (2019 film), a Nigerian comedy thriller film
- Three Thieves (graphic novel series), a graphic novel series by Scott Chantler
- The Three Million Trial, a 1926 Soviet silent comedy film, released as Three Thieves in the United States
- The Three Thieves, a 1954 Italian-French comedy film
