= Heroes Comics =

Comic book store in London, Ontario, Canada

- Type: Private
- Industry: Retail
- Headquarters: 186 Dundas Street; London, Ontario; N6A 1G7
- Number of locations: 1
- Area served: London, Ontario
- Products: Comics, sports cards, toys
- Owner: Brahm Wiseman
- Website: https://heroescomics.ca/

Heroes Comics is a comic book store operating in London, Ontario, Canada. The store won a Harry Kremer comics retailer award at the 2013 Joe Shuster Awards ceremony.

== About the store ==
The store, which is the biggest comic book store in southwestern Ontario, is cited as one of the most successful current retail interests in London's downtown core area. Sixty percent of the store's sales comes from selling comic books, including mainstream, manga, alternative, graphic novels, and trade paperbacks. The next largest portion of sales comes from genre collectibles and toys such as action figures, which together account for 25% of sales. The final 15% of sales comes from sports cards.

The store's history dates back to 1988, when it was founded by the Robinson family. Ownership changed hands in 2000 when Brahm Wiseman, who was hired as an employee in 1998, took over the company. At the time of the takeover, the store had two outlets: one in the downtown core of the city and a smaller one in White Oaks Mall in the southern part of the city. Wiseman later closed the mall outlet, and in 2008, the remaining store moved to a nearby larger location at 186 Dundas Street. Furthermore, in defiance of the decline of retail businesses in the downtown core, Heroes renovated internally in 2016 to expand with a second floor of retail space in the back.

The city has an unusually large number of equivalent retailers in close proximity, due in part to the city's large post-secondary student population including students from the University of Western Ontario (whose main library includes a 10,000+ comic book collection in its materials). The competing comic book retailers and the London Public Library collaborate on Free Comic Book Day with local cross-promotions which has grown to become a major popular event for the city downtown's core.

In addition to its regular business operations, the business is committed to public affairs. The store is involved in organizations such as London Downtown Business Association and Mainstreet London. The store also participates individually with the London Public Library on events to encourage youth literacy through comics, such as Comic Jam, which is held during March Break. Furthermore, Wiseman has held lectures at the Thames Valley District School Board's professional development seminars about the use of the comics medium in education.

In 2013, the store was presented with the Harry Kremer Award for Outstanding Canadian Comic Book Retailer, as part of the Joe Shuster Awards in Toronto.
