= T. M. Maple =

T.M. Maple (c. 1956–1994) was the pseudonym of Jim Burke, a Canadian who wrote more than 3,000 letters to comic book letter columns between 1977 and 1994.

Burke's letters were quite popular among readers as well as editors, and he wrote prolifically to a diverse number of comic publishing companies and titles. Burke originally signed his letters as "The Mad Maple," but Marvel Comics editor Tom DeFalco abbreviated it to "T.M. Maple" to make it sound like a real name (thus circumventing a new policy at the company to stop printing letters submitted under pseudonyms). Burke took a liking to the new name and began using it exclusively (including variations like "Theodore Maddox Maplehurst") until 1988, when in Scott McCloud's Zot! #21 he revealed his real name. At around the same time, he also revealed his real name in a letter to Action Comics Weekly #615.

Starting in 1986, Burke wrote a column called "The Canuck Stops Here" in the fanzine It's a Fanzine. With artist/publisher Allen Freeman, Burke co-created the superhero Captain Optimist and wrote five issues of the series.

After Burke died of a heart attack in 1994, he was eulogized in a number of letter columns published by DC Comics, the company he probably wrote to most prolifically.

== Tributes ==
In tribute to Burke, the St. Paul, Minnesota, comic book convention FallCon holds all of its guest panel presentations in the "TM Maple Edutorium."

In 2014, the Joe Shuster Awards inaugurated the T. M. Maple Award, in recognition of someone from the "Canadian comics community for achievements made outside of the creative and retail categories who had a positive impact on the community." The first recipients of the award were Burke himself (posthumously) and Debra Jane Shelly.
