= Trabeculae of corpus spongiosum of penis =

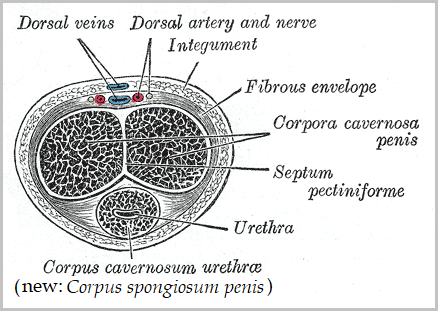
- Transverse section of the penis. The trabeculae are seen inside the singular corpus cavernosum urethrae (corpus spongiosum penis) at the bottom.

Details

Identifiers
- Latin: trabeculae corporis spongiosi penis
- TA98: A09.4.01.021
- TA2: 3683
- FMA: 76520

The trabeculae of corpus spongiosum of penis are the numerous fibrous and elastic bands dividing the corpus spongiosum penis into irregular compartments, giving the entire structure a spongy appearance.

The trabeculae of corpus spongiosum of penis are more delicate, nearly uniform in size, and the meshes between them smaller than in the corpora cavernosa penis: their long diameters, for the most part, corresponding with that of the penis.

The aforementioned compartments fill with blood during a penile erection.

== See also ==
- Trabeculae of corpora cavernosa of penis
