= Canadian Comic Book Creator Awards Association =

Canadian comic book honors organization

The Canadian Comic Book Creator Awards Association was formed in 2004 as a means to honour Canadian creators, publishers and retailers in the medium of comic books.

With permission of the estate of Joe Shuster, the Canadian-born co-creator of Superman the creator and publisher awards are named the Joe Shuster Awards for Canadian Comic Book Creators. The JSA's honour excellence in Canadian comic book writing, art, cartooning, publishing and more. There is also a Hall of Fame that honours veteran creators. An additional award, the Outstanding Canadian retailer award is named after Harry Kremer the late owner of Now & Then Books in Kitchener, Ontario.

== Overview ==
The organization consists of an administrative (or executive) committee, a series of nominating committees and juries.

The only provision for active membership in any of the nominating committees or the administrative committee is that the member not be actively creating or publishing comic books, webcomics or graphic novels that could be eligible for consideration for any of the existing categories during the judging period. Eligible publishers and creators may participate in the special judging committee for the Harry Kremer comic book retailer award.

The Association is a not-for-profit organization. Funds for the Joe Shuster Awards are raised from donations, sponsorship and eBay auctions of prints and other specialty items.

In late 2007, the CCBCAA membership ratified an organizational charter, the position of Executive Director and Associate Director were created (supplanting Chairperson and Assistant). Directors of the CCBCAA are voted into their positions for two award seasons, unless they vacate the position prior to the end of term.

In 2008 a new fundraising initiative was launched entitled "Visions of an Icon". The Visions project involves the donation of original art interpretations of a single comic book character by Canadian artists and cartoonists. The pieces are displayed on a few occasions and then auctioned off on eBay to raise funds for the next year's awards. In 2008 the subject was Superman and in 2009 the subject was Wolverine. The Visions program was suspended in 2010.
