= From the Notebooks of Dr. Brain =

2007 novel by Minister Faust

- Front-cover of the North American Version. Seen are Dr. Brain and Omnipotent Man during a therapy session.
- Author: Minister Faust
- Language: English
- Genre: Science fiction
- Publisher: Del Rey Books
- Publication date: January 2007
- Publication place: Canada
- Media type: Paperback
- Pages: 385
- ISBN: 978-0-345-46637-2
- OCLC: 71210377
- Dewey Decimal: 813/.6 22
- LC Class: PR9199.4.M57 F76 2007

From the Notebooks of Dr. Brain (2007), is the title of a science fiction novel by Minister Faust. The novel is essentially a fictional self-help book for superheroes written by the character Dr. Eva Brain-Silverman a.k.a. Dr. Brain, the world's leading therapist for the extraordinary abled, titled Unmasked! When Being A Superhero Can't Save You From Yourself: Self-Help Guide for Today's Hyper Hominids. The novel follows the adventures and therapy sessions of the members the Fantastic Order of Justice, Earth's most powerful, and dysfunctional, superteam.

Some reviewers have noted that many of the characters are parodies of characters from "mainstream" comic book publishers such as DC Comics and Marvel Comics and from the famous graphic novel Watchmen, itself a comic book deconstruction.

== Awards ==
The Carl Brandon Society Kindred Award, 2008.

Special Citation (runner-up), Philip K. Dick Award 2007.
