= The Coyote Kings of the Space-Age Bachelor Pad =

- Author: Minister Faust
- Language: English
- Genre: Science Fiction
- Publisher: Del Rey
- Publication date: 2004
- Publication place: Canada
- Media type: Print (Paperback)
- Pages: 531
- ISBN: 0-345-46635-7

The Coyote Kings of the Space-Age Bachelor Pad is a comic science fiction novel and social satire written by Canadian writer and activist Malcolm Azania under the pen name of "Minister Faust". His first book, it received major international release in August 2004 by the publisher Random House.

Unconventionally, the novel is told from eleven points of view employing distinct first-person narrative voices. Set in Edmonton in 1995, it follows two main characters: Hamza, Sudanese-Canadian former honours English student working as a dishwasher, and Yehat, a Trinidadian-Canadian, a video store clerk and inventor. Hamza is also a Muslim, although his faith is somewhat in crisis. Stuck in a rut, their lives are going nowhere until a mysterious woman shows up, seduces Hamza and draws the two into a quest for a magic artifact.

The "Coyote" is a name that symbolizes an interesting story of his birth. The story that clarifies the name that he chose for himself was shared with the mysterious women. He faithfully believes in the way his name correlates to his character; the strength and the mysteriousness of a sneaky coyote. With good and evil fighting behind the scene known as, the Secret Society on a quest to capture the Secret artifact- the Canopic Jar. The Meanys are bad guys businessmen that create a special cream which resembles the look of crack cocaine and has the ingredients of human bones. Hazma and his Coyote Crew fight the Meanys to capture the great jar that holds ancient secrets of Egyptian knowledge and to unravel the truth. The quest to find the Canopic jar is action filled with an ending that has a twist.

"Minister Faust brings their world alive in a jumpy, hold-nothing-back style," wrote Gerald Jonas in the New York Times Book Review. "Faust anatomizes [the Edmonton setting] with the same loving care Joyce brought to early-20th-century Dublin.... Faust's debut novel is a fresh and stylish entertainment."

"With an attention to detail and an eye for the absurd," wrote reviewer Rick Klaw in the Austin Chronicle, "it is as if Faust channeled Mark Twain to write a Neal Stephenson novel."
