= Stanley Berneche =

Canadian artist

- Born: 1947 (age 78–79) Windsor, Ontario, Canada
- Area: Cartoonist
- Notable works: Fuddle Duddle, Captain Canada
- Awards: Joe Shuster Awards Hall of Fame

Stanley Berneche (born 1947) is a Canadian artist. He was born in Windsor, Ontario.

Berneche became known in the early 1970s, for working on the Canadian humour magazine Fuddle Duddle, published by Jeffrey R. Darcey in 1971–2. Berneche and writer Peter Evans, created the character Captain Canada and his sidekick Beaverboy for Fuddle Duddle's third and fourth issues. Berneche also drew the strip True Tales of the RCMP for the Canadian Boy Scout magazine Trailblazers.

He was inducted into the Canadian Comic Book Creator Hall of Fame as part of the 2008 Joe Shuster Awards.
