= Cape & Cowl =

Canadian comic book shop

Cape & Cowl Comics & Collectibles
- Type: comic book shop
- Founded: 2014; 12 years ago
- Key people: Jay Aaron Roy (proprietor)
- Website: capeandcowlcomics.ca

Cape & Cowl Comics & Collectibles is a Canadian comic book shop based in Sackville, Nova Scotia. It is owned by proprietor Jay Aaron Roy. The shop serves a twofold purpose of selling items and providing a safe community space for at-risk, LGBTQ+ and disabled youth. While the shop sells a wide variety of independently produced items by local artists and authors, most of its revenue comes from the selling of mass-produced commercial items, such as Funko Pop vinyl figurines, comic books, video game cartridges and Disney Infinity toys. The business was started in 2014.

== History ==
Cape & Cowl was started in 2014 by proprietor Jay Aaron Roy, a Dalhousie University alumni with a degree as a playwright and stage-directing graduate. Roy, who is openly transgender, framed the shop around a foundation of being a queer-owned space in Sackville. Sackville, a small suburban arm of the Halifax Regional Municipality and widely considered to be a small town, had very few bookstores and no comic book shops prior to the opening of Cape & Cowl, although the city of Halifax had several comic book shops, including chain competitor Strange Adventures Comics. Cape & Cowl originally opened in a corner of a strip mall on Sackville Drive, and was since moved and situated in the Sackville Commercial Centre in 2019, having since become the main anchor business in this plaza since the closure of Ripster's (a year-round Halloween store business that sold mostly commercial party items).

== Structure and inventory ==
Cape & Cowl is a physical business, situated within a large L-shaped plaza in the centre of Sackville, while retaining an online website with a limited list of its available stock, as well. The physical location is known for its youth safe space located in the public storefront, which features sofas, a television set, video games, books, and resources for youth and community members seeking help and support.

The shop's inventory consists largely of commercial mass-produced products, although it also sells self-published and vanity press books, independent zines, independent art, locally made toys, jewellery, pinback buttons, patriotic flags, hair accessories and other locally produced things. Cape & Cowl also specializes in pride-based content, including pinback buttons, flags, queer and gay literature, asexuality awareness material, trans awareness material, education pamphlets and pride parade t-shirts. The shop also has a large amount of items categorized as "vintage", mainly VHS tapes, fantasy genre fiction and Beanie Babies.

== Cultural impact ==
Cape & Cowl had initially been regarded as an independent comic book shop business with little community or public notability. Since its original opening, the shop has become regarded as a community support space in Sackville, well-known for its various projects and undertakings. Jay Aaron Roy works with Autism Nova Scotia to keep his shop sensory friendly and provide resources for autistic patrons, having focused on more independent autism resources rather than resources from international autism research organizations like Autism Speaks. This includes hosted events such as storytelling sessions and Dungeons & Dragons clubs. The shop's LGBTQ+ drop-in centre and safe space is known in the community for its interventions and resources, and was inspired, according to Roy in a CTV News interview, by the realization that his childhood upbringing included bullying from peers with his own mother's small business serving as a safe place for him. Additionally, Roy's decision to sell self-published books has allowed a number of authors to be discovered, most notably in the case of Chelee Cromwell's Newbia book series. Cape & Cowl has been endorsed by a number of notable public figures, including DisabilityX organizer Paul Vienneau and comic book artist Darwyn Cooke. Nova Scotia-born actor Elliot Page, who had come out as transgender in 2020, was invited to visit the comic book shop by Jay Aaron Roy.

== See also ==
- Strange Adventures (comics retailer)
