= Joe Shuster Award =

Canadian award for comics, graphic novels and webcomics

- Joe Shuster Award logo
- Awarded for: Outstanding achievements in Canadian comics
- Date: April 2005
- Country: Canada
- Presented by: Canadian Comic Book Creator Awards Association
- First award: 2005
- Final award: 2021
- Website: www.joeshusterawards.com

The Joe Shuster Canadian Comic Book Creator Awards (or Joe Shuster Awards) are given out annually for outstanding achievements in the creation of comic books, graphic novels, webcomics, and comics retailers and publishers by Canadians. The awards, first handed out in April 2005, are named in honour of Joe Shuster (1914–1992), the Canadian-born co-creator of Superman.

The Canadian Comic Book Creator Awards Association is a not-for-profit organization formed in 2004 to administer the awards.

The Joe Shuster Awards have been on hiatus since 2021.

== History ==
The Joe Shuster Awards were initiated in 2005 by the Canadian Comic Book Creator Awards Association to honor achievement in comics by Canadian creators. The Association's founding organizers included James Waley, Kevin A. Boyd, Tyrone Biljan, and Dave Darrigo.

The first awards were presented on April 30, 2005, at the Paradise Comics Toronto Comicon (an event with which Joe Shuster Awards co-organizer Kevin A. Boyd was also involved). In the years 2006–2007, the awards continued to be presented during the Paradise Comics Toronto Comicon weekend.

In 2008, for the fifth annual awards, the ceremony was not tied to a comic convention for the first time; it was held at the University of Toronto as part of the Word on the Street National Book & Magazine Festival. In 2009 and 2010, the awards were hosted at event spaces in Toronto, including Innis Town Hall at the University of Toronto.

The 7th Annual Joe Shuster Awards ceremony was held in 2011 at the Calgary Comic and Entertainment Expo, marking one of the first major presentations outside Ontario. The 2012 awards were presented during Montreal Comiccon at the Palais des congrès de Montréal. The 2013 awards were presented at Fan Expo Canada in Toronto, with the ceremonies hosted by Ty Templeton and Rob Salem. The 2014 awards were presented on September 20 at Back Space Toronto.

In 2015, the Joe Shuster Awards faced a financial shortfall that placed the future of the awards in doubt – the awards organization had exhausted its funds and sought sponsorships and donations to continue operations. Plans for the 2015 ceremony were initially put on hold. Nonetheless, the Joe Shuster Awards resumed in 2015 (presented on October 18, 2015, at the Forest City Comicon, London, Ontario) and continued to be presented annually through the late 2010s. The awards' organizers credited community sponsorship and support for enabling their continuation.

The 2016 awards were again held at the Forest City Comicon.

The Awards have been on hiatus since 2021.

== Overview ==
The Joe Shuster Awards are comic book industry-oriented awards that recognize the achievements of Canadian citizens and permanent residents. Founded initially as an English-language comics award, the criteria have been changed and refined since 2006 to be inclusive of all works published in Canada (see Language criteria). The majority of the awards were initially committee-nominated, public-vote awards, with write-in nominations accepted for the International Creator award. This was changed in 2008 to a committee-nominated, jury-selected model, with publishers nominating works within the relevant award category. The model established in 2008 was designed to eliminate voter bias and ballot stuffing. The jury deliberates until they agree on a winner, discussing the merits of each candidate.

They are named after Canadian-born cartoonist Joe Shuster (1914–1992), who co-created Superman in 1938. The award, which focuses on professionally published and distributed comics from all publishers including those designated as mainstream such as DC Comics and Marvel Comics, is complemented by the Doug Wright Awards, which focuses on alternative comics, cartooning, and comic strips and avoid mainstream published works.

From the Joe Shuster Award website:

When it comes to defining comics our job is to be as INCLUSIVE as possible when narrowing the selections down to an EXCLUSIVE number of annual nominees – there is only one winner in each category though! We strive to ensure that our nominates represent the entire country's output – whether that output is in English or French (Canada's two official languages) or in other languages – the central defining characteristic of our nominees are that they are Canadian. We don't censure Canadian creators who work with non-Canadian publishing houses – while Canada is a large and diverse country, for the creative awards, there are a very limited number of Canadian publishers.

=== Harry Kremer Retailer Award ===
The late Harry Kremer, owner of Now & Then Books in Kitchener-Waterloo, Ontario, was an industry pioneer and a promoter and patron of the medium. He was an owner of one of the first comic book specialty stores in Canada. His memory is kept alive in the award that has been named after him – the Outstanding Canadian Comic Book Retailer Award. The Award was given to Kremer's store in 2005, with open voting from 2006 onwards.

=== Gene Day Self-Publisher Award ===
Named after the late comics artist and self-publisher Gene Day (1951–1982), this award honours Canadian comic book creators or creative teams who self-published their work, but did not have the books distributed by a third-party distributor. The award winner receives a bursary of $500. The award was introduced in 2009. Prior to this, Dave Sim had established the Howard E. Day Prize distributed annually at the Small Press and Alternative Comics Expo in Columbus, Ohio, from 2002 to 2008.

In 2018, 2019, and 2020, the Gene Day Self-Publisher Award was given to both an individual and to an anthology collection.

=== Comics For Kids Award (the Dragon Award) ===
This award was established in 2004. Works considered for this award are comic books and graphic novels that are targeted at readers 14 and under. Nominees are selected by a team of educators led by Jennifer Haines, MA, B.Ed., who is also the proprietor of Guelph, Ontario's The Dragon comic book shop.

=== T.M. Maple Award ===
New in 2014, "the T. M. Maple Award will go to someone (living or deceased) selected from the Canadian comics community for achievements made outside of the creative and retail categories who have had a positive impact on the community."

=== Canadian Comic Book Creator Hall of Fame ===
The Hall of Fame includes dozens of creators such as Hal Foster, Win Mortimer, John Byrne, Dave Sim, Al Hewetson, and more.

== Language criteria ==
The Joe Shuster Awards honour original work published during the previous calendar year in any language. However, Canada has two official languages – French and English, so extra research and attention is given to works published in the two official languages. In order to ensure that bilingual works are included on the ballot, two nominating committees select the finalists in each official language and the finalists are merged for the announced ballot. The nominated books are then given to jury members who can read both official languages for equal consideration.

== Citizenship and residency ==
The Joe Shuster Awards are open to all Canadian citizens.

Canadian citizens who have chosen to reside outside of Canada are still eligible for consideration, unless they contact the Awards organization and notify them that they have surrendered their Canadian citizenship and no longer wish to be considered for their recent work as a Canadian citizen.

Non-Canadians who have achieved permanent residency status in Canada are also eligible for consideration. In order to be considered for inclusion as a resident, the individual must have lived in Canada for three years. Permanent residents who do not wish to be considered may opt out of the Awards program before the selection process begins by sending a statement in writing to the Awards organization. If an approved permanent resident moves away from Canada, they are no longer considered eligible for the awards.

== Categories ==
Categories and winners of Joe Shuster Awards are as follows:

=== Outstanding Writer ===
- 2005 (tie) Samm Barnes for Doctor Spectrum (Marvel Comics)
- 2005 (tie) Ty Templeton for The Batman Adventures (DC Comics)
- 2006 J. Torres for Batman: Legends of the Dark Knight and Teen Titans Go! (DC Comics), and Love As a Foreign Language (Oni Press)
- 2007 Darwyn Cooke for Superman Confidential #1–2 (DC Comics).
- 2008 Cecil Castellucci for The P.L.A.I.N. Janes (DC/Minx)
- 2009 Mariko Tamaki for Skim (Groundwood Books) and Emiko Superstar (DC/Minx)
- 2010 Maryse Dubuc for Les Nombrils 4: Duels de belles (Dupuis)
- 2011 Emilie Villeneuve for La fille invisible (Glénat Québec)
- 2012 Kurtis J. Wiebe for The Green Wake #1–8; The Intrepids #1–6; "Logan's Lost Lesson"/Marvel Holiday Special 2011
- 2013 Fanny Britt for Jane, le renard & moi a.k.a. Jane, the Fox & Me
- 2014 Kurtis Wiebe for Rat Queens, Peter Panzerfaust, Dia De Los Muertos. Lonesome (Image)
- 2015 Mariko Tamaki for This One Summer (Groundwood Books)
- 2016 Jeff Lemire for Justice League United (DC Comics), Descender, Plutona (Image Comics), All-New Hawkeye. Extraordinary X-Men (Marvel Comics), Book of Death: Fall of Bloodshot. Bloodshot Reborn (Valiant)
- 2017 Jeff Lemire for Black Hammer (Dark Horse Comics), Descender, Plutona (Image Comics), All-New Hawkeye, All-New X-Men, Moon Knight, Old Man Logan, Extraordinary X-Men (Marvel Comics), Bloodshot Reborn,Bloodshot U.S.A., 4001 A.D.: Bloodshot (Valiant)
- 2018 Jim Zub for Avengers 1.MU, Secret Empire United 1, Thunderbolts 7–12, Uncanny Avengers 25–28, Zombies Assemble 1–3, 0, Zombies Assemble 2 1–2 (with Yusako Komiyama) (Marvel Comics), Glitterbomb: The Fame Game 1–4, Wayward 21–25 (Image Comics), Dungeons & Dragons: Frost Giant's Fury 3–5 (IDW) Freelance 1–4 (with Andrew Wheeler) (Chapterhouse)
- 2019 Chip Zdarsky for Peter Parker, The Spectacular Spider-Man and Marvel Two-in-One (Marvel Comics)
- 2020 Mariko Tamaki for Laura Dean Keeps Breaking Up with Me (First Second), Harley Quinn: Breaking Glass (DC Comics), Spider-Man and Venom: Double Trouble (Marvel Comics), and Archie #706–709 (Archie Comics)
- 2021 Kimiko Tobimatsu for Kimiko Does Cancer: A Graphic Memoir (Arsenal Pulp)

=== Outstanding Artist ===
- 2005 Kaare Andrews for Spider-Man/Doctor Octopus: Year One (Marvel Comics)
- 2006 Pia Guerra for Y: The Last Man (DC Comics/Vertigo) and a story in Spider-Man Unlimited #10 (Marvel Comics)
- 2007 Darwyn Cooke and J. Bone for Batman/The Spirit #1 (DC Comics).
- 2008 Dale Eaglesham for Justice Society of America #2–4, 6–7, 9–11 (DC Comics)
- 2009 David Finch for Ultimatum #1–2
- 2010 Stuart Immonen for Ultimate Spider-Man 130–133, New Avengers 55–60, Fantastic Four 569 (Marvel), The CBLDF Presents Liberty Comics 2 – "Trampoline Hall" (Image Comics)
- 2011 Francis Manapul for Adventure Comics#6, The Flash #1–6, Superman/Batman #75 (DC Comics)
- 2012 Stuart Immonen for "Fear Itself #1–7; "Queen, King, Off-Suit"/X-Men: To Serve and Protect #4; "Say You're Dead"/Outlaw Territory Volume 2
- 2013 Isabelle Arsenault for "Jane, le renard & moi" a.k.a. Jane, the Fox & I
- 2014 Fiona Staples for Saga 9–17 (Image)
- 2015 Adrian Alphona for Ms. Marvel (Marvel Comics)
- 2016 Steve Skroce for We Stand on Guard (Image Comics)
- 2017 Yanick Paquette and Nathan Fairbairn for Wonder Woman: Earth One (DC Comics)
- 2018 Stuart Immonen for Amazing Spiderman 25–31, 789, Marvel Legacy 1 (Marvel Comics), Empress 7 (Icon/Marvel Comics)
- 2019 Karl Kerschl for Isola (Image Comics)
- 2020 tie:
  - Jamal Campbell for Far Sector #1–2 and Naomi #1–6 (DC Comics)
  - François Miville-Deschênes for Zaroff (Lombard)
- 2021 Jason Fabok for Batman: Three Jokers (DC Comics)

=== Outstanding Cartoonist (writer and artist) ===
- 2005 Darwyn Cooke for DC: The New Frontier (DC Comics)
- 2006 Bryan Lee O'Malley for Scott Pilgrim Vol. 2 (Oni Press)
- 2007 Darwyn Cooke for The Spirit #1 (DC Comics).
- 2008 Jeff Lemire for Essex County Vol. 1: Tales From The Farm, Essex County Vol. 2: Ghost Stories (Top Shelf)
- 2009 Dave Sim for Glamourpuss #1–4 and Judenhass
- 2010 Michel Rabagliati for Paul, tome 06: Paul à Québec (La Pastèque)
- 2011 Tin Can Forest for Baba Yaga and the Wolf (Koyama Press)
- 2012 Ramon K. Pérez for Jim Henson's Tale of Sand
- 2013 Jeff Lemire for The Underwater Welder and Sweet Tooth
- 2014 Zviane (Sylvie-Anne Ménard) for Les deuxièmes (Pow Pow)
- 2015 Bryan Lee O'Malley for Seconds – A Graphic Novel (Random House Canada)
- 2016 Jillian Tamaki for SuperMutant Magic Academy (Drawn & Quarterly)
- 2017 Guy Delisle for "S'enfuir, récit d'un otage" aka Hostage (Dargaud)
- 2018 Jeff Lemire for Roughneck (Gallery 13), Royal City 1–8 (Image Comics)
- 2019 Emily Carroll for Beneath the Dead Oak Tree (Shortbox)
- 2020 Nina Bunjevac for Bezimena (Fantagraphics)
- 2021 Michel Rabagliati for Paul à la maison (La Pastèque) / Paul at Home (Drawn & Quarterly)

=== Comics for Kids Award (The Dragon Award) (new in 2009) ===
- 2009 Jellaby Book 1 by Kean Soo
- 2010 Nightschool: The Weirn Books Vols. 1–2 (Yen Press) by Svetlana Chmakova
- 2011 Three Thieves Book One: Tower of Treasure (Kids Can Press) by Scott Chantler
- 2012 Ariane et Nicolas Tome 6: Les Toiles Mysterieuses by Paul Roux
- 2013 Cat's Cradle Volume 1: The Golden Twine by Joe Rioux
- 2014 Couettes tome 2: Bidou and tome 3: Adopte-moi ! by Séverine Gauthier (writer) and MiniKim (Maïté Lajic, artist) (Dargaud)
- 2015 Agent Jean! tome 6 et 7, by Alex A., (Presses Aventure)
- 2016 Awkward by Svetlana Chmakova (Yen Press)
- 2017 Bera the One-Headed Troll by Eric Orchard (First Second)
- 2018 Another Castle by Andrew Wheeler and Paulina Ganucheau (Oni Press)
- 2019 Aventurosaure by Julie Paré-Sorel
- 2020 Operatic / Opératique by Kyo Maclear, Byron Eggenschwiler (Groundwood Books/la Pastèque)
- 2021 Shirley & Jamila Save Their Summer by Gillian Goerz (Dial Books)

=== Gene Day Award for Canadian Self-Publishing (new in 2009) ===
- 2009 Jesse Jacobs for Blue Winter, Shapes in the Snow
- 2010 Ethan Rilly for Pope Hats No.1
- 2011 John Martz for Heaven All Day
- 2012 Dakota McFadzean for Ghost Rabbit
- 2013 Cory McCallum and Matthew Daley – The Pig Sleep: A Mr. Monitor Case
- 2014 Steven Gilbert for The Journal of the Main Street Secret Lodge
- 2015 James Edward Clark for Evil #3
- 2016 Cloudscape Comics Collective for Epic Canadiana
- 2017 Nunumi for Sky Rover
- 2018:
  - Individual: Jenn Woodall for Marie and the Worrywart
  - Anthology Collection: Moonshot: The Indigenous Comics Collection vol. 2, edited by Hope Nicholson (AH Comics)
- 2019:
  - Individual: Jamie Michaels, Doug Fedrau for Christie Pits
  - Anthology Collection: Wayward Sisters: An Anthology of Monstrous Women, edited by Allison O'Toole (To Comix Press)
- 2020:
  - Individual: Becka Kinzie for Gehenna: Death Valley
  - Anthology Collection: This Place: 150 Years Retold (Highwater Press)
- 2021 Elaine M. Will for The Last Band on Earth #1 (Cuckoo's Nest Press)

=== Harry Kremer Retailer Award ===
- 2005 Now & Then Books (Kitchener, Ontario)
- 2006 Strange Adventures (Halifax, Nova Scotia)
- 2007 Happy Harbor (Edmonton, Alberta)
- 2008 Big B Comics (Hamilton, Ontario)
- 2009 Legends Comics and Books (Victoria, British Columbia)
- 2010 The Beguiling (Toronto, Ontario)
- 2011 Planète BD (Montréal, Quebec)
- 2012 Silver Snail (Toronto, Ontario)
- 2013 Heroes Comics (London, Ontario)
- 2014 The Comic Shop (Vancouver, British Columbia)
- 2015 Amazing Stories (Saskatoon, Saskatchewan)
- 2016 Another Dimension (Calgary, Alberta)
- 2017 L'imaginaire (Laurier, Quebec)
- 2018 Gotham Central (Mississauga, Ontario)
- 2019:
  - Variant Edition Comics (Edmonton, Alberta)
  - Special Bonus Award: The Dragon (Guelph, Ontario)
- 2020 Comic Book Addiction (Whitby, Ontario)
- 2021 Heroes World (Markham, Ontario)

=== T.M. Maple Award (new in 2014) ===
- 2014 T.M. Maple aka Jim Burke (1956–1994)
- 2014 Debra Jane Shelly (1974–2014)
- 2015 Michael Hirsh (1948–)
- 2015 Patrick Loubert (1947–)
- 2015 Robert Charpentier (1960–2015)
- 2016 John Bell (1952–)
- 2017 Kenneth Ketter (1947–2022)
- 2018 Mark Askwith (1956–)
- 2019 Jennifer Haines
- 2020 "'The many creators, retailers, publishers, fans and others who stepped up to help others during the ongoing COVID-19 Crisis in 2020.' Specifically called out were:
  - Leonard Wong and Jay Bardyla for organizing the Canadian Comic Shop Relief Fund through the Comic Legends Legal Defense Fund
  - The Be Our Heroes, Canada telethon (Heroes World, Gotham Central, The Dragon and Cyber City Comix)
  - The many artists who donated work for auction to the above, as well as other fundraising for those in need like local food banks, and to those that supported these initiatives by purchasing work."
- 2021 William "Bill" Paul (1955–2021)

== Discontinued categories ==
The following categories are no longer awarded:

=== Outstanding Achievement ===
- 2005 Dave Sim and Gerhard for completing Cerebus in 2004. Begun in 1977, this 300-issue series is a milestone in comic book publishing and is the longest running creator-owned comic book series.
- 2006 NO WINNER
- 2007 NO WINNER
- 2008 David Watkins for using comic books as a teaching tool.

=== Outstanding Publisher ===
- 2005 Arcana Studio
- 2006 Drawn & Quarterly
- 2007 Drawn & Quarterly
- 2008 Drawn & Quarterly
- 2009 Les 400 coups / Mécanique Générale
- 2010 La Pastèque
- 2011 Koyama Press

=== Outstanding Colourist ===
- 2008 Dave McCaig for Nextwave, Agents of H.A.T.E. #12, New Avengers #27–35, Fallen Son: The Death of Captain America #1: Wolverine, Marvel Comics Presents #1–4, Wolverine #50, Avengers Classic #7 (Marvel Comics) DC Infinite Halloween Special #1 (DC Comics), The Other Side #4–5 (DC/Vertigo) Stephen Colbert's Tek Jansen #1 (Oni Press)
- 2009 François Lapierre for "Gédéon et la bête du lac" Contes et légendes du Québec (Glénat Québec), Magasin général 4 (Casterman)
- 2010 Nathan Fairbairn for The Amazing Spider-Man #605, Dark Reign: The List – X-Men #1, Dark X-Men: The Confession #1 (Cover), Guardians of the Galaxy #16, 18–19, House of M: Masters of Evil #1, Marvel Mystery Comics 70th Anniversary Special #1, Nation X #1, Realm of Kings: Imperial Guard #1–2, Timestorm 2009–2099: Spider-Man, War of Kings: Warriors #2, Wolverine #72, Wolverine: Origins #32, Wolverine: Weapon X #6–8, X-Factor #39–50, 200 (Variant) (Cover), X-Factor #45, X-Men: Kingbreaker #2–4, X-Men Origins: Gambit #1 (Marvel Comics), Stephen Colbert's Tek Jansen #4–5 (Oni Press)
- 2011 Julie Rocheleau for La fille invisible (Glénat Québec)

=== Voters Choice – Outstanding International Creator ===
- 2006 Brian K. Vaughan for Runaways (published by Marvel Comics), Ex Machina, and Y: The Last Man (published by DC Comics/Vertigo)
- 2007 Brian K. Vaughan for Runaways and Doctor Strange: The Oath (published by Marvel Comics), Pride of Baghdad, Ex Machina, and Y: The Last Man (published by DC Comics/Vertigo)
- 2008 Ed Brubaker for Captain America, Criminal, Immortal Iron Fist and Uncanny X-Men (Marvel Comics)

=== Voters Choice – Favourite Creator (English Language) ===
- 2007 Dan Kim for April & May & June, Kanami & Penny Tribute.
- 2008 Faith Erin Hicks for Zombies Calling

=== Voters Choice – Favourite Creator (French Language) ===
- 2007 Michel Rabagliati for Paul a la Pêche, published by La Pastèque.
- 2008 Philippe Girard for Danger Public

=== Outstanding WebComic Creator/Creative Team ===
- 2007 Dan Kim, for April & May & June, Kanami & Penny Tribute
- 2008 Ryan Sohmer & Lar deSouza, for Looking for Group & Least I Could Do
- 2009 Cameron Stewart for Sin Titulo
- 2010 Karl Kerschl for The Abominable Charles Christopher
- 2011 Emily Carroll for His Face All Red and more
- 2012 Emily Carroll for various comics
- 2013 Michael DeForge for Ant Comic
- 2014 Jayd Aït-Kaci (with Christina Strain) for The Fox Sister
- 2015 Nicole Chartrand for Fey Winds: A Fantasy Webcomic
- 2016 CATEGORY ON HIATUS
- 2017 Ty Templeton for Bun Toons
- 2018 Gisèle Lagacé and David Lumsdon for Ménage à 3
- 2019 CATEGORY ON HIATUS
- 2020 Chip Zdarsky, Jason Loo, et al. for Afterlift

=== Outstanding Cover (2008–2010) / Cover Artist (2011–) ===
- 2008 Steve Skroce for Doc Frankenstein #6 (Burlyman)
- 2009 Niko Henrichon for Hostile Tome 1: Impact (Dupuis)
- 2010 Darwyn Cooke for Richard Stark's Parker: The Hunter (IDW)
- 2011 Fiona Staples
- 2012 François Lapierre for Chroniques Sauvages
- 2013 Mike del Mundo
- 2014 Julie Rocheleau for La colère de Fantômas tome 1: Les Bois de justice (published by Dargaud)
- 2015 Darwyn Cooke
- 2016 CATEGORY ON HIATUS
- 2017 Michael Cho
- 2018 Djibril Morissette-Phan
- 2019 CATEGORY ON HIATUS
- 2020 Nick Bradshaw

== Canadian Comic Book Creator Hall of Fame Inductees ==
- 2005:
  - Joe Shuster (1914–1992)
  - Leo Bachle (a.k.a. Les Barker) (1926–2003)
  - Adrian Dingle (1911–1974)
  - Hal Foster (1892–1982)
  - Ed Furness (1911–2005)
  - Rand Holmes (1942–2002)
- 2006:
  - Jon St. Ables (1912–1999)
  - Owen McCarron (1929–2005)
  - Win Mortimer (1919–1998)
  - Dave Sim (1956–)
- 2007:
  - Albert Chartier (1912–2004)
  - Gerald Lazare (1927–2021)
  - Jacques Hurtubise (Zyx) (1950–)
  - Gene Day (1951–1982)
- 2008:
  - Ted McCall (1901–1975)
  - Pierre Fournier (1949–2022)
  - Stanley Berneche (1947–)
  - John Byrne (1950–)
- 2009:
  - George Menendez Rae (1906–1992)
  - Réal Godbout (1951–)
  - Ken Steacy (1955–)
  - Diana Schutz (1955–)
- 2010:
  - Dave Darrigo (1954–2024)
  - Serge Gaboury (1954–)
  - Deni Loubert (1951–)
  - Richard Comely (1950–) – in celebration of the 35th anniversary of Captain Canuck #1
  - George Freeman (1951–) – in celebration of the 35th anniversary of Captain Canuck #1
  - Claude St. Aubin (1951–) – in celebration of the 35th anniversary of Captain Canuck #1
- 2011:
  - Chester Brown (1960–)
  - Todd McFarlane (1961–)
- 2012 NO INDUCTEES
- 2013:
  - Vernon Miller (1912–1974)
  - Murray Karn (1924–)
  - Arn Saba now known as Katherine Collins(1947–)
- 2014:
  - Cy Bell (1904–197?)
  - Edmond Good (1910–1991)
  - Ty Templeton (1962–)
- 2015:
  - Doris Slater (1918–1964)
  - James Waley (1954–)
- 2016:
  - Tedd Steele (1922–1994)
  - Ley aka Shirley Fortune (1921–1998)
  - Fred Kelly (1921–2005)
  - Mark Shainblum (1963–)
  - Darwyn Cooke (1962–2016)
- 2017:
  - Jack Tremblay (1926–)
  - Gabriel Morrissette (1959–)
  - Lovern Kindzierski (1964–)
  - Julie Doucet (1965–)
  - Stuart Immonen
- 2018:
  - Sid Barron (1917–2006)
  - Jacques Goldstyn aka Boris (1958–)
  - David Boswell (1953–)
  - Tom Grummett (1959–)
- 2019:
  - Al Hewetson (1946–2004)
  - Dale Keown (1962–)
  - Ken Lashley (1967–)
  - Gerhard (1959–)
- 2020:
  - Gregory Gallant aka Seth (1962–)
  - Bernie Mireault (1962–2024)
- 2021:
  - Ho Che Anderson (1960–)
  - Denis Rodier (1963–)
  - Ronn Sutton (1952–)

== See also ==
- Doug Wright Award
- Canadian Cartoonist Hall of Fame
