= Strange Adventures (comics retailer) =

- Company type: Private
- Industry: Retail
- Headquarters: Fredericton, New Brunswick
- Number of locations: 3
- Area served: The Maritimes
- Products: Comics
- Owner: Calum Johnston
- Website: http://www.strangeadventures.com/

Strange Adventures is a comic book retail chain with three stores, all located in Canada's Maritime Provinces (see Locations below). All three are owned by Calum Johnston and named after a comics series published by DC from 1950 through 1973.

== Locations ==
=== Fredericton, New Brunswick ===
Opened: 1992

Address: 68 York St, Fredericton, NB E3B 3N4

=== Halifax, Nova Scotia ===
Opened: 1994

Address: 5110 Prince St, Halifax, NS B3J 1L3

=== Dartmouth, Nova Scotia ===
Opened: 2010

Address: 101 Portland St, Dartmouth, NS B2Y 1H7

== Awards and Mentions ==
- 2006: Strange Adventures was presented with the Harry Kremer Award for Outstanding Canadian Comic Book Retailer, as part of the Joe Shuster Awards in Toronto.
- 2005: Strange Adventures employee Mike Drake was chosen as "Halifax's Best Salesperson" by local weekly paper The Coast.
- 2001: The store received a Will Eisner Spirit of Comics Retailer Award as part of the Eisner Awards.
- 1996: Strange Adventures was named "The World's Greatest Comic Store," by Previews Magazine, and appeared in two Superman comics: Adventures of Superman #547 and Superman: The Man of Steel #74.
- Strange Adventures (Halifax location), has been awarded "Best Comics Store" by The Coast for 12 years in a row, from 2006 to 2017. It also won the award an additional 7 years running from 1998 to 2004. The winner of the 2005 year is unknown, due to there being no entry for that year on The Coast's website.

== See also ==
- Cape & Cowl
