= Julie Rocheleau (artist) =

Canadian animation designer, graphic novel artist and illustrator

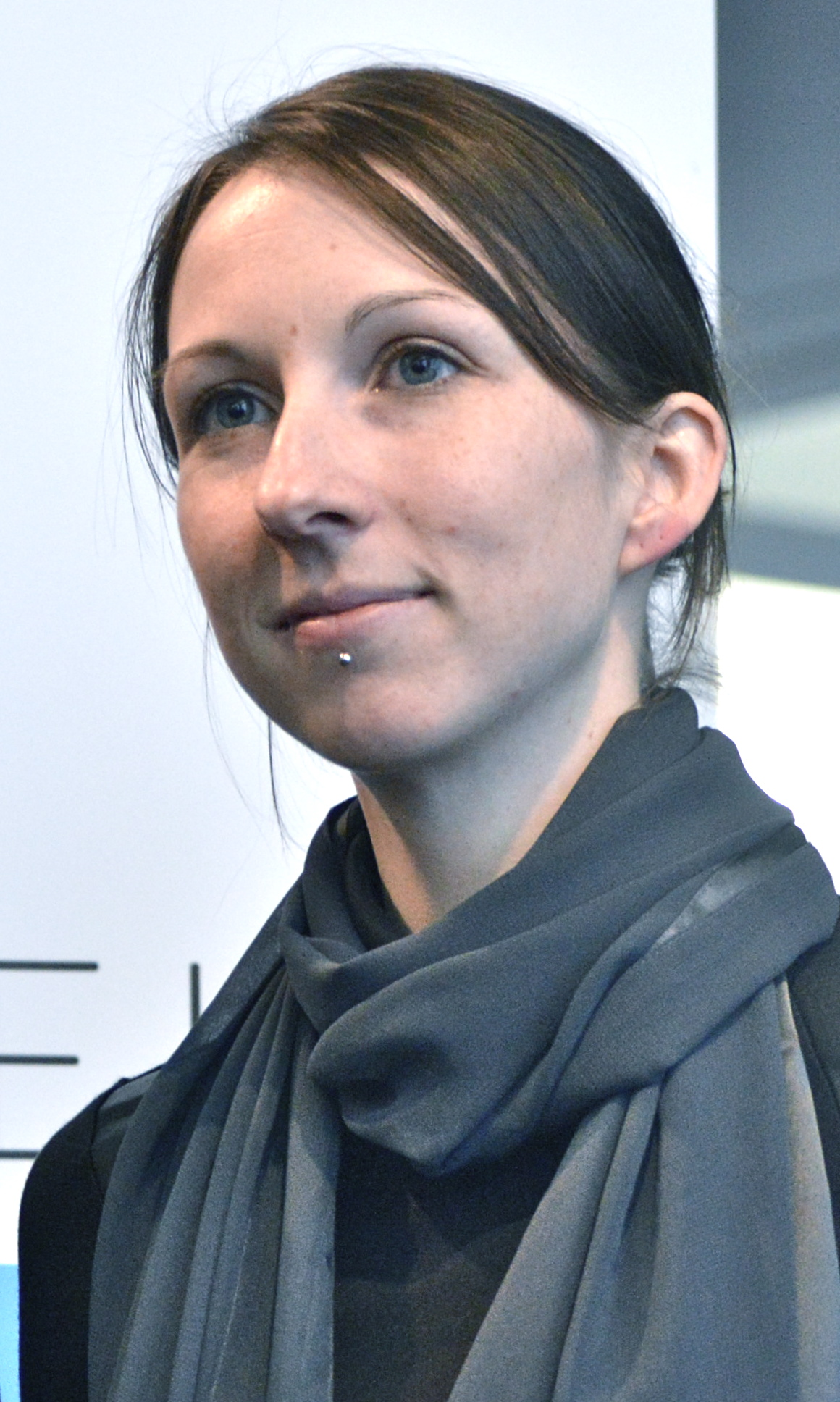
- Born: 1982 (age 43–44); Montreal
- Known for: illustrator, graphic novels

Julie Rocheleau (born 1982) is a Canadian animation designer, graphic novel artist and illustrator living in Montreal, Quebec.

From 1999 to 2002, she studied at the Cégep du Vieux Montréal. Her short animation Griselda won second prize in a category for promising students in a competition sponsored by Teletoon. From 2002 to 2011, she worked for different animation studios in character design and storyboarding. During the same period, she illustrated books for children and young adults and designed notices for various cultural events. In 2010, she published her first graphic novel La Fille invisible, based on a script by Emilie Villeneuve; the pair received a Prix Bédéis causa for the work. In 2011, Rocheleau also received a Joe Shuster Award for outstanding colourist; she was also nominated in the outstanding artist category. The first book in the series La colère de Fantômas, with writer Olivier Bocquet received an award in the graphic novel category at the Festival Interpol'art at Reims. In 2014, the first book of La Colère de Fantomas earned her a Joe Shuster Award for outstanding cover artist.

== Selected work ==
- Tommy l’enfant-loup (2015), illustrator, text by Samuel Archibald
- Deuxième étage de l’océan (2015), illustrator, text by Carle Coppens
- La petite patrie, graphic novel (2015), with writer Normand Grégoire, based on the 1972 novel by Claude Jasmin
- About Betty's Boob (2018), with Vero Cazot, published by Archaia Entertainment
