= Barb Galler-Smith =

Canadian author

Barb Galler-Smith is a Canadian science fiction and fantasy author living in Edmonton, Alberta.

Her published works include The Druids Saga series of historical fantasy novels, including Druids, Captives and Warrior. Druids was shortlisted for the Aurora Award for Best Novel in 2012, and in 2021, she was shortlisted for the Aurora Award for Best Short Fiction for "Night Folk".

Galler-Smith is a member of SF Canada, Canada's national association of science fiction and fantasy authors.

== Works ==
=== Novels ===
==== The Druids Saga (with Josh Langston) ====
- Druids (2009)
- Captives (2011)
- Warriors (2013)

=== Anthologies ===
- Casserole Diplomacy and Other Stories: An On Spec 25th Anniversary Retrospective (2014) with Robin S. Carson et al
