= Gayleen Froese =

Canadian novelist and singer-songwriter

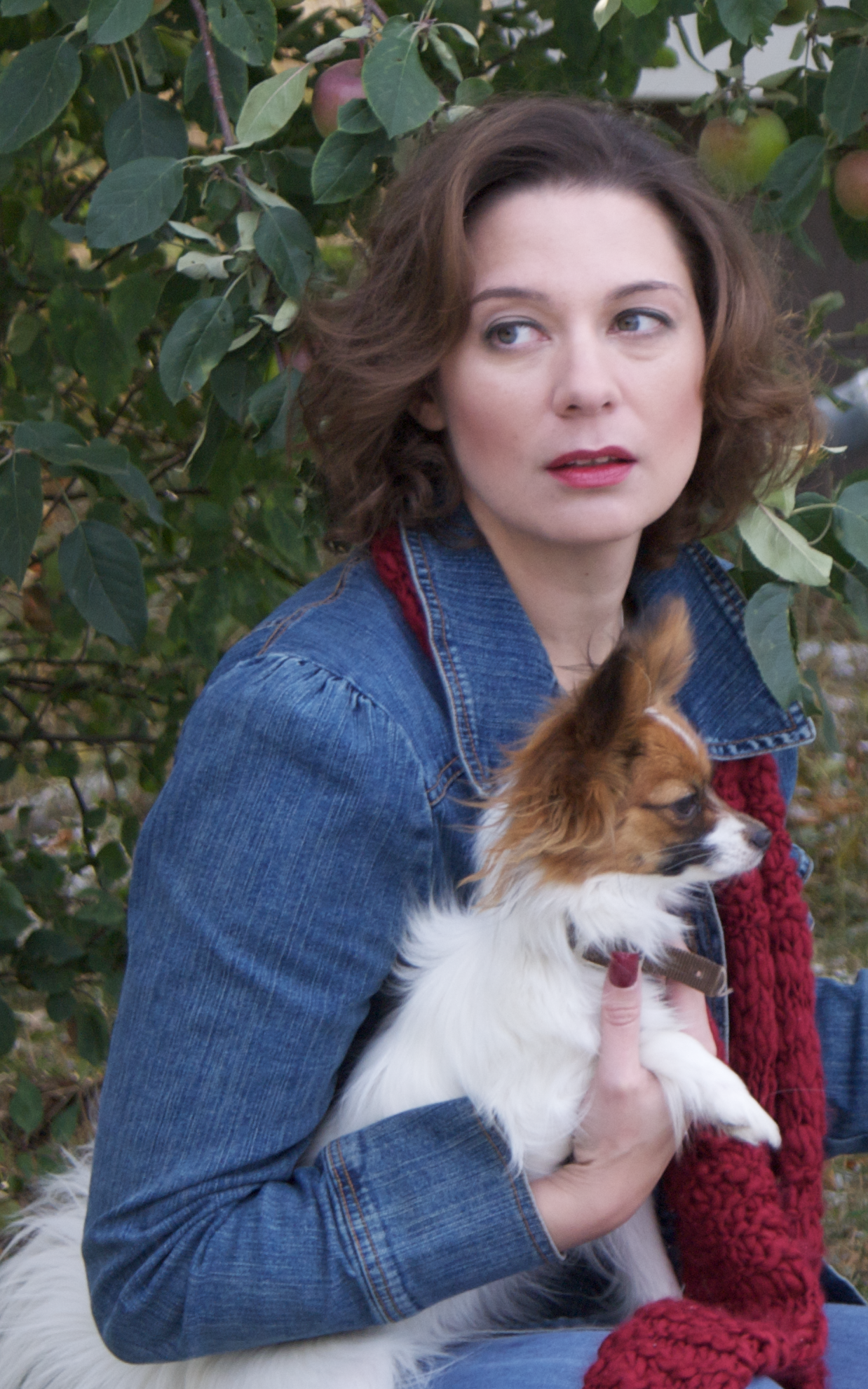
- Born: 1972
- Occupation: Writer
- Website: www.gayleenfroese.com

Gayleen Froese (born 1972) is a Canadian novelist and singer-songwriter. She is the author of six novels, including two paranormal mystery novels and the Ben Ames Casefiles series of detective novels. Her third novel, The Girl Whose Luck Ran Out, has been translated into French and German. She is also the author of the superhero novel Lightning Strike Blues, released in 2023, and urban fantasy The Dominion, released in 2024.

Born in Saskatoon, Saskatchewan, Froese was educated at Ryerson University (now Toronto Metropolitan University) in Toronto. Her first album, Obituary, won an Undiscovered Artist Award from CBC Radio and Froese was a showcase artist at Toronto's North by Northeast music festival in 1998.

Froese appeared on Canadian Learning Television's A Total Write Off in 2006, and was one of twelve writers selected as a finalist for BookTelevision's 3 Day Novel Contest in 2007. (Filmed in 2007, the show did not air until late 2009; Froese ended up as the winning contestant.) She was also twice shortlisted in the overall International Three-Day Novel Contest.

Froese's non-fiction and humour writing has appeared in publications including See Magazine, The Rat Creek Press, and Edify.

As of 2022, Froese lives in Alberta Avenue, in Edmonton, Alberta.

== Bibliography ==
- Touch (2005) ISBN 1-896300-93-6
- Grayling Cross (2011) ISBN 978-1-897126-73-8
- The Girl Whose Luck Ran Out (2022) ISBN 978-1-64108-382-9
- Lightning Strike Blues (2023) ISBN 978-1-64108-525-0
- The Dominion (2024) ISBN 978-1-64108-537-3

== Discography ==
- Obituary (1997)
- Chimera (1999)
