= Minister Faust =

Canadian novelist and politician (born 1969)

Malcolm Azania
- Born: 1969 (age 56–57); Edmonton, Alberta
- Writing career
- Pen name: Minister Faust
- Years active: 1986–present
- Genre: Science fiction
- Political party: New Democratic Party

Malcolm Azania (born 1969), better known by his pen name Minister Faust, is a Kenyan-Canadian novelist, playwright, poet, journalist, teacher, and science fiction writer. He has also written for video games, including Mass Effect 2, Gift of the Yeti, and Darkspore. From 2014 to 2015, he was a writer in residence at the University of Alberta.

== Personal life ==
Born in Edmonton, Alberta, Canada, Malcolm Azania is the son of a Kenyan and a Canadian. He attended local schools and started writing from an early age, showing an interest in science fiction.

== Career ==
Azania's first published work was his science fiction play, The Undiscovered Country (1986), for Montreal's Creations Etc.

He was the writer in residence at the University of Alberta. Writing in the science fiction and fantasy genres, he refers to his subgenre of writing as imhotep-hop. Imhotep-hop is an Africentric subgenre that draws inspiration from numerous ancient African civilizations and focuses on a future in which people struggle for justice.

Most of his works deal with political themes in some way, with the most notable works being the ongoing War & Mir series.

=== Novels ===
==== The Coyote Kings ====
Azania's debut novel, The Coyote Kings, Book One: Space Age Bachelor Pad (2004), was a finalist for the Philip K. Dick Award, The Locus Best First Novel Award, and The Compton-Cook Award. The novel follows Sherem, an Ethiopian savant, and Hamza and Yehat through a story filled with action, pop culture and Africentric themes.

==== From the Notebooks of Dr. Brain ====
His second book, From the Notebooks of Dr. Brain (2007), was the winner of the Carl Brandon Society Kindred Award and the runner-up for the Philip K. Dick Prize. The story explores around six fictional super heroes in therapy and their revelations of the difficulties of being a celebrity.

==== The Alchemists of Kush ====
The Alchemists of Kush (2011) follows the paths of two Sudanese boys as they attempt to change the world.

The Alchemists of Kush is a Science Fiction Afrofuturist novel written under Malcom Azania’s pen name: Minister Faust. This novel is broken up into four sections each containing its own collection of chapters. The chapters in this novel switch back and forth from "The Book of Then" and "The Book of Now." There is a third book called "The Book of the Golden Falcon," which can be found at the end of the novel before the Falconic Glossary and map of Ancient and Modern Kush. In "The Book of Then," The Alchemists of Kush's setting is in the Savage Lands and the Blacklands of Africa. "The Book of Now" takes place in Canada. The Alchemists of Kush was published in July 2011. Each one of the three books contains 10 chapters.

In the Author's Note, Minister Faust gives some suggestions on how to read his work. Minister Faust writes "certainly, feel free to read the novel in the path that it's printed… But you could also read all the "Then"s as a group, followed by "Now"s together, ending with "The Book of the Golden Falcon"... or read the first chapters of every "Falcon," "Then," and "Now," all the way through to each one's tenth chapter."

Minister Faust incorporates the ancient practice of Alchemy, and Egyptian hieroglyphics, numerology, and mythology within The Alchemists of Kush. Minister Faust puts a heavy emphasis on past lives and reincarnation as well as following those karmic patterns within each spirit. In his own words, Minister Faust, in a YouTube interview, introduces the Alchemical system as "a mystical system; a knowledge system." Faust fused "Ancient Egyptian history" and "modern African realities" together to create The Alchemists of Kush, an Africentric novel.

The setting for The Alchemists of Kush "The Book of Now" is in Kush located in E-Town (Edmonton), Canada. In his YouTube book trailer, Minister Faust describes E-Town as a "Somali, Ethiopian, Eritrean, and Sudanese district." "The Book of Then" takes place in Africa, in the Savage lands and the Blacklands over seven thoughts and years before "The Book of Now" (modern day time) takes place.

For the 2017 published version of The Alchemists of Kush, the summary on the back of the novel reads "two Sudanese "Lost Boys." Both fathers murdered during civil war. Both mothers forced into exile through lands where the only law was violence. To survive, they became ruthless loners and child soldiers. Before finding mystic mentors who transformed them to achieve their destinies. Separated by seven thousand years, and connected by immortal truth... One, known to the streets as Supreme Raptor: the other, known to the Greeks as Horus, son of Osiris. Both born in fire. Both baptized with blood. Both brutalized by the wicked. Both sworn to transform the world and themselves by the power... of Alchemy."

==== War & Mir ====
His War and Mir series consists of two novels, War & Mir, Volume I: Ascension (2012), and War & Mir, Volume II: The Darkold (2014), with a third novel currently being written. The story centers on Taharqa Douglass, a man with a unique trait that marks him as a prime target for drafting into an interstellar war.

=== Video games ===
==== Mass Effect 2 DLC ====
Azania co-wrote Mass Effect 2's Kasumi DLC (Downloadable Content). It was initially released on April 6, 2010, for the PC and Xbox, and released on January 18 for the PS3. The DLC introduces a new character and several new outfits, as well as an original quest line.

==== Gift of the Yeti ====
Azania wrote BioWare's Gift of the Yeti, an app for Facebook which was released in 2009, with the intent of raising $10,000 for Childs Play, a charity that funds hospitals for children. In the game, the player controls a yeti who must take Santa's place for one year, and deliver presents to everyone while evading the police.

==== Darkspore ====
Azania wrote maxis' Darkspore, which was released on April 26, 2011. The game involves creating an avatar and fighting across various worlds in an attempt to save the galaxy.

=== Stage writing and sketch comedy ===
Azania's stage writing career began at 17 when he wrote the science fiction play The Undiscovered Country for Montreal's Creations Etc. His play The Wonderful World of Wangari is about the Kenyan Nobel Peace laureate Dr. Wangari Maathi. Azania also has written sketches for local television shows, the 11:02 Show and Gordon’s Big Bald Head.

=== Print journalism ===
Azania's short stories and poems appear in a multitude of collections, and his articles have been included in numerous publications such as i09, and Adventure Rocketship: Let's all Go To the Science Fiction Disco.

=== Radio and television ===
==== Africentric radio ====
Azania founded Africentric Radio in 1991, and continued with it until 2012. It was also called The Terrodome: Black Radio In the Hour Of Chaos and later The Terrordome: The Afrika All World News Service. During its time on the air, Africentric Radio featured many prominent political and artistic figures, including Americans Noam Chomsky and Ice-T.

==== HelpTV ====
During the years 2007–2008, Azania was the host and associate producer for HelpTV, a Canadian national daily program.

==== Book TV's 3 Day Novel Contest ====
Azania was the celebrity Judge on Book TV's 3 Day Novel Contest for two seasons.

== Politics ==
Azania was a candidate in the 2004 Canadian federal election, representing the New Democratic Party in Edmonton Strathcona. He placed third, but increased the NDP's support in the riding by over 3,000 votes.

== Bibliography ==
=== Books ===
- The Coyote Kings of the Space Age Bachelor Pad (2004) Novel
- From the Notebooks of Dr. Brain (2007) Novel
- The Alchemists of Kush (2011) Novel
- War & Mir, Volume I: Ascension (2011) Novel
- Journey To Mecha (2011) Collection
- A Bad Beat Was Brewing (2013) Collection
- E-Force (2013) Collection
- War & Mir, Volume II: The Darkold (2014) Novel

== Video games ==
- Gift Of the Yeti (2009)
- Mass Effect 2: Kasumi – Stolen Memory (2010) Downloadable Content
- Darkspore (2011) Video Game

=== Stage writing ===
- The Wonderful World of Wangari
- The Undiscovered Country

== Electoral record ==
2004 Canadian federal election: Edmonton—Strathcona
Party	Candidate	Votes	%	±%	Expenditures
Conservative	Rahim Jaffer	19,089	39.40	−2.60	$67,449
Liberal	Debby Carlson	14,057	29.01	−2.88	$67,910
New Democratic	Malcolm Azania	11,535	23.80	+9.02	$46,100
Green	Cameron Wakefield	3,146	6.49	–	$2,353
Marijuana	Dave Dowling	519	1.07	−0.38	
Marxist–Leninist	Kevan Hunter	103	0.21	−0.08	$26
Total valid votes		48,449	100.00		
Total rejected ballots		150	0.31		
Turnout		48,599	65.66		
