= Now & Then Books =

Former comic shop in Ontario, Canada

- Type: Private
- Industry: Retail
- Founded: 1971
- Founder: Harry Kremer; Bill Johnson
- Headquarters: Kitchener, Ontario, Canada
- Products: Comics

Now & Then Books was a comic shop in Kitchener, Ontario, Canada. Founded by Harry Kremer and Bill Johnson, it was one of the earliest comic shops to operate in North America, and employed Dave Sim before he began his comic book series Cerebus. The Harry Kremer Retailer Award at the Joe Shuster Awards was named in honour of co-founder Harry Kremer, who died in 2002.

== History ==
George Henderson's Memory Lane, the country's first comic shop, opened in Toronto in 1967. Inspired by it, Now & Then Books was opened on Queen Street in Kitchener by Harry Kremer and Bill Johnson in 1971. Kremer soon took over complete ownership of the store.

Now and Then Times was a newsletter published by the store beginning in 1972. Its first issue had work by Dave Sim, who later worked at the store 1976–1977, before he began his comic book series Cerebus. Sim said of the store, "It was the first and only place in Kitchener that I ever felt truly comfortable before or since".

Kremer died from heart problems in 2002. The Harry Kremer Retailer Award is given out each year at the Joe Shuster Awards in memory of Kremer and his shop, which had become the longest-lasting comic shop in North America.

== See also ==
- Canadian comics
