= Phallophobia =

Fear of penises or masculinity

- Specialty: Psychology

Phallophobia in its narrower sense is a fear of the penis and in a broader sense an excessive aversion to masculinity.

== Terminology ==
Alternative terms for this condition include ithyphallophobia or medorthophobia. An individual who has the condition is a phallophobe. The term is derived from the word phallo in Greek meaning penis and at times denoting masculinity, coupled with the suffix phobia. Medomalacuphobia, the fear of losing an erection or acquiring erectile dysfunction, is its antonym. At its most extreme, phallophobia when coupled with a psychiatric condition may result in issues such as Klingsor Syndrome or ederacinism.

== Scope ==
In its broadest sense, the term can be used metaphorically. However, in its narrower sense it has been described as a symptom that is more likely to be exhibited by women. In sources that appear to use it in the original sense, it is sometimes nuanced as a byproduct or hyponym of an aversion, dislike or fear of the protruding appendage resemblance of the male erection, and how this symbolizes an accompanying aggression or assertiveness. This may occur in an aesthetic setting, or in a sociological setting. Such an aversion is sometimes extended to an unattributable cognitive process while at other times men's self and own experience. In such a scenario, due to the essentiality of such reflexes for men, some correspondents have posited the feasibility of such a diagnosis if a man has relatively frequent nocturnal penile tumescence since he will probably not notice his erections then. In cultures that discuss the male genitalia as a singular unit, the phenomenon of castration anxiety may overlap with phallophobia from a linguistic standpoint. Although usually referring to ordinary erections, the term has also been used in toxicological and therapeutic contexts.

== Cause ==
Sigmund Freud has footnoted the possibility that this fear may be derived from a lack of ingenuity allowing one to ornamentally distance the copulatory organs from the excretory organs. Such a condition can affect both men and women. For others, symptoms include what characterizes a panic attack. It does not necessarily have to be induced by an uncovered penis, but may also result from seeing the manbulging outline or curvature of the penis, perhaps through clothes consisting of thin fabric. In more extreme cases it has been likened to the fight or flight response ingrained within the human body wherein an individual ceases to be intimate with their male partner and is unable to visit mixed gender establishments where people are likely to wear more revealing clothing, such as a gym, beach, cinema or living rooms with a switched on monitor. The fear can recur through any of the senses including accidental touch, sight, hearing the word penis or thinking about an erection. The phobia may have developed from a condition such as dyspareunia, a trauma (usually sexual) that occurred during childhood, but can also have a fortuitous origin. In literature covering human sexuality, it is used as an adjective only to negatively allude to penetrative sex acts. Men who have the phobia may try to avoid wearing sweatpants and other light fabrics, especially in public. Some analysts have purported that the condition may be inherited or may be a combination of genetic inheritance and life experiences. For men with the condition, one of the byproducts is difficulty consummating with a partner due to a sense of vulnerability. This vulnerability may have developed during childhood if they grew up being told by their parents that sex and its physiological functions are evil, sinful and dirty, but were subsequently unable to detach such shameful feelings nor reverse it upon reaching adulthood, even when romantic initiatives were subsequently approved of or encouraged by their parents.

== Behaviour ==
Sometimes the word is used in a sense wherein it is metaphorical and unrelated to its etymological origins, as in for instance when a man sees another man as a rival and a potential source of infidelity for his spouse. Other reviews have applied the term as a euphemism or allegory to indicate that society is in contemporary times less willing to be objective and straightforward in discussions of the physiological aspects of the young male body in general due to prudery, or a celibacist and puritan standpoint that in particular targets men and boys. For instance, Ken Corbett has theorized the fact of widespread absence of the penis as an object of discussion in children's books and parenting books as evidencing that "a kind of phallophobia has crept into our cultural theorizing". In other writings it has been used as an epithet to describe the lesbian or female asexual aversion to male sexuality. Author Fawzi Boubia defines phallophobia as a hostility towards the stronger male gender. The term has also been used as a substitute to indirectly express an aversion to procreation. In criticisms of anti-male sexism, phallophobia is used as an epithet to deride double standards and hypocrisy in the legal system, all down to the set of genitalia one possesses. One of the byproducts of this phobia among women is that it may result in them faking an orgasm to mask their feeling of revulsion around their male spouse. Forms of treatment may include intensive counselling and therapy sessions. Phallophobia has also been used as an algorithm in studies of heuristics in robotic decision making in themes related to sexual temperance.
