= Happy Harbor Comics =

- Company type: Private
- Industry: Retail
- Headquarters: Edmonton, Alberta, Canada
- Area served: Edmonton, Alberta, Canada
- Products: Comics
- Owner: Vince Joyall
- Website: http://www.happyharborcomics.com

Happy Harbor Comics is a comic book store located in Edmonton, Alberta, Canada. Over the past few years, owner Jay Bardyla and his store have participated in the 24-hour comic day to promote comics in general and to raise money for the Alberta Literacy Foundation. In 2005, they raised more than $1600.

2 weeks before Christmas 2018, the staff were informed that Christmas Eve would be their last day. The store and all its assets could not continue and would be liquidated off by Bardyla. Entrepreneur Vince Joyall bought HappyHarbor comics and saved the staff from unemployment. Several newspapers called it a Christmas miracle. Vince still owns HappyHarbor as well as WonderHarbour and the Wonderland Games chain. With locations in Grande Prairie Alberta, Prince George British Columbia and now Edmonton Alberta, the Wonderland chain is the largest comic retain chain in Canada by volume of sales.

== Awards and recognitions ==
- 2007 Eisner Nominee For Retailer Of The Year
- 2007 Harry Kremer Award Winner For Outstanding Canadian Comic Book Retailer
- 2007 See magazine's Reader's Choice Award For Edmonton's Best Comic Store
- 2006 Eisner Nominee For Retailer Of The Year
- 2006 Harry Kremer Award For Canadian Retailer Of The Year Runner-Up
- 2006 Reader's Choice Award For Edmonton's Best Comic Store Runner-Up
