= Three Thieves (graphic novel series) =

Graphic novel series by Scott Chantler

Three Thieves is a graphic novel series by Canadian cartoonist Scott Chantler. It follows the adventures of Dessa (a human), Topper (a dwarf-sized humanoid creature called a norker), and Fisk (a big-sized humanoid creature called an ettin with only one head as opposed to his kind's usual two) as they run from the Queen's "Dragons" (elite personal knights) and at the same time try to track down Greyfalcon, the royal chamberlain who kidnapped Dessa's twin brother. Tower of Treasure received a Joe Shuster Dragon Award in 2011. There are seven books in the series, which were released from 2010 to 2016.

== Books ==
Tower of Treasure is the first book in the Three Thieves series and was published on August 1, 2010. The book follows Dessa, Topper, and Fisk as they attempt to break into the Queen's Treasury in Kingsbridge. They are captured by Captain Drake and the palace guards. Greyfalcon happens upon the scene, and Dessa recognizes him to be one of the men who kidnapped her long lost brother, Jared. Greyfalcon requests that Queen Magda have Dessa, Topper, and Fisk executed, which she agrees to. However, the trio of thieves are able to escape during the night. Topper and Fisk attempt to leave the city, while Dessa goes back to find Greyfalcon. Dessa finds Greyfalcon's chamber empty, and she believes that he's left the city. After a speedy chase, Dessa, Topper, and Fisk all make it out of the city gates. Dessa is still convinced that Greyfalcon kidnapped her long lost brother, and she and her friends set off to find him. Back in Kingsbridge, Queen Magda orders all of the Dragons, a group of the 12 best knights in the kingdom, to pursue and capture the three thieves and Greyfalcon. Captain Drake and the other Dragons leave the city.

The Sign of the Black Rock is the second book in the Three Thieves series, and was published on September 1, 2011. The book follows Dessa, Topper, and Fisk as they are forced off the road by a rainstorm and end up at The Black Rock Inn. During the night, Captain Drake and the rest of the Dragons all arrive at the Inn, and the three thieves narrowly avoid being captured several times. By the end of the night, the Dragons have caught a group of smugglers and arrested the owner of the Inn, Mortimer Grig, but haven't managed to apprehend the three thieves. After the Dragons leave, Dessa learns from Grig's wife that Greyfalcon stayed at the Inn many years ago. Greyfalcon had Jared with him at the time, and Grig's wife Eudora saw a single word in Greyfalcon's book: Astaroth. Because Greyfalcon suspected that she's read something in his book, he tried to cut out her tongue to keep her from telling anyone about it. Grig's wife thinks the word "Astaroth" must be important, and Dessa thanks her for her help.

The Captive Prince is the third book in the Three Thieves series and was published on September 1, 2012. The book follows Dessa, Topper, and Fisk as they save a kidnapped Prince.

The King's Dragon is the fourth book in the Three Thieves series and was published on April 1, 2014. The book follows Captain Drake as he continues to try to capture Topper, Fisk, and an injured Dessa, who are holed up in a remote monastery. While attempting to find them by any means possible, Captain Drake is haunted by memories of his early days as one of the King's Dragons.

Pirates of the Silver Coast is the fifth book in the Three Thieves series and was published on September 1, 2014. The book follows Dessa, Topper, and Fisk as they ride out to sea with a band of smugglers, hoping to find the Island of Astaroth.

The Dark Island is the sixth book in the Three Thieves series and was published on April 5, 2016. The book follows Dessa, Topper, and Fisk as they finally reach the Island of Astaroth, and discover that nothing is as it seems. Meanwhile, Captain Drake has accidentally found Dessa's long lost brother, Jared, and is surprised by what he discovers about Jared's kidnapping.

The Iron Hand is the seventh and final book in the Three Thieves series and was published on October 4, 2016. The book follows Dessa, Topper, and Captain Drake as they race back to Kingsbridge to make a final confrontation with Greyfalcon.

== Setting ==
The series is set in a medieval fantasy world known to the characters as the Six Kingdoms. The kingdoms include Lothar, Medoria, Kamaria, Magishead, Gan, and North Huntington. Gan is technically an empire, as it is independent and is ruled by an Emperor.

== Characters ==
Dessa Redd: the main character, an acrobat in a traveling circus troupe. During an attempt to rob the treasury of the evil Queen Magda, she finds a clue to the whereabouts of her long-lost twin brother Jared. At the end of the last book, she becomes captain of the King's Dragons under King Jared.

Topper: a blue norker, a diminutive mythical creature native to the Six Kingdoms, a juggler with the circus troupe and a pickpocket. He is depicted as waist high in stature, has long pointy ears, and a goatee.

Fisk: a mythical creature of great stature and strength who joined the circus troupe after being rejected by his tribe for being born with only one head (most ettins have 2). He died during the destruction of the island Astaroth in book 6.

Captain Drake: the leader of an elite group of twelve soldiers called the Queen's Dragons. They are tasked with doing her special bidding and serve as a powerful police unit. He was an idealist when young, but became disillusioned with the cronyism and corruption of the Dragons. Drake is uncorrupt, brave and loyal as the day is long. He will pursue his duty to the ends of the earth and will put life and limb on the line for his monarch. Topper often refers to him as Patchy McOne-Eye.

Maarten Greyfalcon: the Queen's chamberlain. Along with his twin brother, he was the heir of the throne of South Huntington before its annexation by North Huntington. He was hired by the Iron Hand crime syndicate to do various tasks for them and ended up their leader. He has wielded a lot of power since the days of the Queen's predecessor, King Roderick. He is a creative genius and designed the traps in the Treasure Tower, along with many other gadgets.

Rylan Greyfalcon: Maarten's twin brother. He is skilled in the manufacture of toys.

Queen Magda: the ruler of North Huntington. She is the firstborn of Roderick and his queen. She hatched the plot along with Greyfalcon to bring about the murder of Jared, thus securing her claim as the only descendant of Roderick.

Jared Redd: Dessa's long-lost twin brother. Even though he is nearly 20 years Magda's junior, North Huntington's laws of Male primogenitor decree him to be the true heir of Roderick, even though he was illegitimately conceived.

King Roderick: the monarch before Queen Magda. He was assassinated by a secret group called the Iron Hand. He is the father of Magda, and the twins Jared and Dessa.

The Kings (Queens) Dragons: the elite group of soldiers who are bodyguards and shock troopers for the monarchs of North Huntington. There are twelve of them. Phineas is a member.
