= Trabeculae of corpora cavernosa of penis =

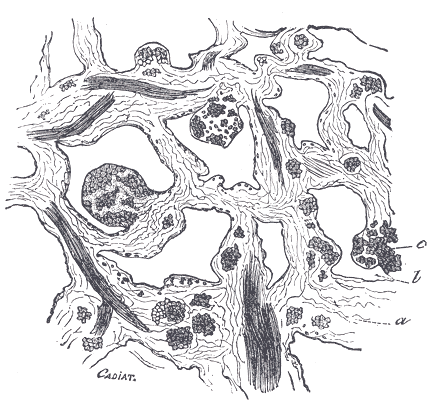
- Section of corpus cavernosum penis in a non-distended condition. a. Trabeculae of connective tissue, with many elastic fibers and bundles of plain muscular tissue, some of which are cut across (c). b. Blood sinuses.

Details

Identifiers
- Latin: trabeculae corporum cavernosorum penis
- TA98: A09.4.01.020
- TA2: 3679
- FMA: 76519

From the internal surface of the fibrous envelope of the corpora cavernosa penis, as well as from the sides of the septum, numerous bands or cords are given off, which cross the interior of these corpora cavernosa in all directions, subdividing them into a number of separate compartments, and giving the entire structure a spongy appearance.

These bands and cords are called the trabeculae of corpora cavernosa of penis, and consist of white fibrous tissue, elastic fibers, and plain muscular fibers. In them are contained numerous arteries and nerves.

The component fibers which form the trabeculae are larger and stronger around the circumference than at the centers of the corpora cavernosa; they are also thicker behind than in front.

The interspaces (cavernous spaces), on the contrary, are larger at the center than at the circumference, their long diameters being directed transversely.

They are filled with blood, and are lined by a layer of flattened cells similar to the endothelial lining of veins.

== See also ==
- Trabeculae of corpus spongiosum of penis
