= List of Canadian comics creators =

Canadian cartoonists have been active since the earliest days of cartooning, in both English and French, the two official languages of Canada.

Canadian cartoonists are prominently active in every area of comics and cartooning, from editorial and gag cartoons, to comic strips, comic books, graphic novels and webcomics.

== Brief overview ==
While earlier examples of Canadian comics tend to imitate American and British examples, over the course of the 20th Century, Canadian cartoonists have cut out niches of their own, as in Hal Foster's pioneering adventure comic strip work on Tarzan and Prince Valiant; in Lynn Johnston's For Better or For Worse, readers follow the characters as they grow older and deal with a variety of issues, unusual for the gag-a-day comic strip world of the latter 20th Century; Dave Sim's Cerebus tackles epic-sized themes over the course of a 6000-page, self-contained story, while providing new publishing models in the forms of self-publishing and graphic novel collections.

John Wilson Bengough and his Puck-inspired humour magazine Grip (1873–1892) was a popular forum for political cartoons in the earliest decades following Canadian Confederation in 1867. At the start of the 20th century, Albéric Bourgeois brought what may have been the first continuing comic strip to use word balloons to Canadian newspapers when he created Les Aventures de Timothée in 1903.

In 1938, Toronto-born artist Joe Shuster, along with American writer Jerry Siegel, released Superman to the world, kickstarting the fledgling comic book industry while popularizing the superhero genre. During World War II, Canadian superhero comic books got their start when Adrian Dingle debuted Nelvana of the Northern Lights in Triumph Adventure Comics, one of the "Canadian whites", comic books with colour covers and black-and-white interiors that were common in Canada during the war years.

Canadians made a bigger impact on alternative comics later in the century. Dave Sim's 6000-page epic Cerebus pushed creative boundaries with Sim pushing a model of self-publishing as an ideal. Chester Brown had a broad influence breaking taboos in his Yummy Fur series, and was part of an autobiographical comics trend in the 1990s that included Seth and Julie Doucet. Graphic novels have since become more prominent, and webcomics have also become a popular outlet for Canadian cartoonists, including cartoonists like David Hayward also known as The NakedPastor.

== What is "Canadian"? ==
The Joe Shuster Awards considers eligible anyone who has Canadian citizenship (regardless of residence) or permanent residence. The following list reflects that inclusive philosophy in choosing whom to consider "Canadian".

JS HoF = year of induction into the Joe Shuster Hall of Fame

CC HoF = year of induction into the Canadian Cartoonist Hall of Fame

Name	Born		Died		Notable works	Primary language	Nationality	JS HoF	CC HoF	Honours
Aislin	1942-11-11	Ottawa, Ontario			Editorial cartoons	English	Canadian			OC
Adrian Alphona					Runaways	English				
Kaare Andrews	1975-07-13	Saskatoon, Saskatchewan			Spider-Man/Doctor Octopus: Year One, Spider-Man: Reign	English	Canadian			
Ho Che Anderson	1969	London, England				English	Canadian			
Graham Annable	1970-06-01	Sault Ste. Marie, Ontario			Grickle, Hickee	English	Canadian			
Chris Bachalo	1965-08-23	Portage la Prairie			Death: The High Cost of Living, Shade the Changing Man, X-Men	English				
Leo Bachle	1923	Toronto, Ontario	2003	Toronto, Ontario	Johnny Canuck	English	Canadian	2005		
Bado	1949-05-21	Montréal, Québec			Editorial cartoons	French English	Canadian			
Walter Ball	1911	Essa, Ontario	1995		Rural Route	English				
Raoul Barré	1874-01-29	Montréal, Québec	1932-05-21	Montréal, Québec		French	Canadian American			
Sid Barron	1917-06-13	Toronto, Ontario	2006-04-26	Victoria, British Columbia	Editorial cartoons	English	Canadian			
Jimmy Beaulieu	1974					French	Canadian			
Al Beaton	1923	Vancouver	1964-08-24	Algonquin Park, Ontario	Ookpik	English	Canadian			
Kate Beaton	1983-09-08	Mabou, Nova Scotia			Hark! A Vagrant	English	Canadian			
Marc Bell	1971-11-24	London, Ontario				English	Canadian			
John Wilson Bengough	1851-04-07	Toronto, Ontario	1923-11-02	Toronto, Ontario	Grip Ltd.	English	Canadian		2005	
Stanley Berneche	1947	Windsor, Ontario			Captain Canada	English		2008		
Ian Boothby						English	Canadian			
David Boswell	1953				Reid Fleming, World's Toughest Milkman	English	Canadian		2011	
Rupert Bottenberg	1971-07-19	Wolfville, Nova Scotia				English				
Albéric Bourgeois	1876-11-29	Montréal, Québec	1962-11-17		Les Aventures de Timothée	French	Canadian		2005	
Sheree Bradford-Lea		Hamilton, Ontario			Editorial cartoons, Life Outside The Box cartoons, Freelance Single Panel (Gag) cartoons and comic strips	English				
Ed Brisson		Oshawa, Ontario			Murder Book, Iron Fist, Ghost Rider, Predator		Canadian			
Chester Brown	1960-05-16	Montréal, Québec			Yummy Fur, Louis Riel	English	Canadian	2011		
John Byrne	1950-06-06	West Bromwich, United Kingdom			Uncanny X-Men, Fantastic Four, Superman, Alpha Flight, Next Men	English	American	2008		
Roy Carless	1920-11-03	York County, Ontario	2009-01-02	Hamilton, Ontario	Editorial cartoons	English				
Geneviève Castrée	1981	Loretteville, Québec	2016	Anacortes, Washington		French	Canadian			
Howard Chackowicz	1969	Laval, Québec				English	Canadian			
Bernard Chang	1972	Montréal, Québec				English	American; Canadian			
Serge Chapleau	1945-12-05	Montréal, Québec			Editorial cartoons	French	Canadian			
Albert Chartier	1912		2004		Onésime, Séraphin, Les Canadiens	French	Canadian	2007		
Svetlana Chmakova	1979-10-07	Soviet Union			Dramacon, Nightschool	English	Russian; Canadian	2010		
Gary Clement	1959–07	Toronto, Ontario			Editorial cartoons	English				
David Collier	1963-01-24	Windsor, Ontario			Collier's, Just the Facts, Surviving Saskatoon	English	Canadian			
Mike Constable	1943	Woodstock, Ontario	2026-07-03		Guerilla, Piranha, Union Art Services	English	Canadian			
Darwyn Cooke	1962-11-16	Toronto, Ontario	2016-05-14		DC: The New Frontier, The Spirit, Richard Stark's Parker novel adaptations	English	Canadian			
Dave Cooper	1967	Nova Scotia			Suckle, Crumple, Weasel	English	Canadian			
William Garnet "Bing" Coughlin	1905-10-07	Ottawa, Ontario	1991-09-04	Springfield, Pennsylvania		English				
Fred Curatolo	1958	Toronto, Ontario			Editorial cartoons	English				
Michael de Adder	1967-05-25	Moncton, New Brunswick			Walterworld, Editorial cartoons	English				
Willow Dawson	1975					English	Canadian			
Gene Day	1951-08-13	Kingston, Ontario	1982-09-23	Gananoque, Ontario		English	Canadian			
Stéphane Delaprée	1956	Paris, France				English				
Adrian Dingle	1911	Barmouth, Gwynedd, Wales	1974-12-22	Toronto, Ontario	Nelvana of the Northern Lights	English	Canadian	2005		
Andy Donato	1937	Scarborough, Ontario	2026-09-15		Editorial cartoons	English				
Julie Doucet	1965-12-31	Montréal, Québec			Dirty Plotte	French English	Canadian			
Max Douglas	1970-09-15	Toronto, Ontario			Therefore Repent!, Sea of Red, RevolveЯ	English	Canadian			
Dale Eaglesham	1962				Justice Society of America, Alpha Flight	English	Canadian			
Wally Fawkes	1924	Vancouver, British Columbia			Flook	English				
George Feyer	1921	Hungary	1967–03	Los Angeles, California		English			2006	
Patrick Fillion	1973	Québec			Naked Justice	English	Canadian			
David Finch	1971-07-04					English	Canadian			
Hal Foster	1892-08-18	Halifax, Nova Scotia	1982-07-25	Winter Park, Florida, United States	Prince Valiant	English		2005		
Pierre Fournier	1949				Red Ketchup, Les Aventures du Capitaine Kébec, Croc, Michel Risque	French	Canadian	2008		
Tom Fowler						English	Canadian			
J. D. Frazer	1969				User Friendly	English				
George Freeman	1951-05-27	Selkirk, Manitoba				English	Canadian	2010		
Jimmy Frise	1891	Scugog Island, Ontario	1948		Birdseye Center	English	Canadian		2009	
Ed Furness	1911	United Kingdom	2005	Toronto, Ontario, Canada	Freelance, Commander Steele	English	Canadian	2005		
Brian Gable	1949	Saskatoon, Saskatchewan			Editorial cartoons	English	Canadian			
Michel Gagné	1965	Roberval, Québec, Canada				English				
Gerhard	1959-04-14	Edmonton, Alberta			Cerebus	English	Canadian			
Tony Gray					The Incredible Conduit	English	Canadian			
Bus Griffiths	1913	Moose Jaw, Saskatchewan	2006-09-25	Comox, British Columbia	Now You're Logging	English	Canadian			
Annie Groovie	1970-04-11	Trois-Rivières, Québec			Léon	French	Canadian			
Tom Grummett	1959	Saskatoon, Saskatchewan			"The Death of Superman"	English	Canadian			
Pia Guerra						English	Canadian			
Ralph Hamelmann	1967-06-21	St. John's, Newfoundland and Labrador				English				
Glen Hanson					Chelsea Boys	English				
Faith Erin Hicks					Demonology 101, Zombies Calling, War at Ellesmere	English	Canadian			
Rand Holmes	1942-02-22	Truro, Nova Scotia	2002-03-15	Nanaimo, British Columbia	Harold Hedd	English	Canadian	2005	2007	
Jacques Hurtubise (cartoonist), aka ZYX	1950		2015		Croc	French	Canadian	2007		
Ed Huxtable	1904		1992		Editorial Cartoonist, Globe & Mail (1940s)	English	Canadian			
Stuart Immonen						English	Canadian			
Geof Isherwood	1960-12-04	Quantico, Virginia				English	American			
Lynn Johnston	1947-05-28	Collingwood, Ontario			For Better or For Worse	English			2008	OC, OM
Henri Julien	1852-05-14	Québec City, Québec	1908-09-17			French	Canadian			
Dale Keown	1962				Pitt	English	Canadian			
Karl Kerschl		Toronto, Ontario				English	Canadian			
Eric Kim	1977					English				
Leonard Kirk	2000	United States				English	American			
Nikahang Kowsar	1969	Iran			Editorial cartoons	English	Iranian			
Dave Lapp					Drop-In	English				
Julian Lawrence	1963-12-29	England				English				
Gerald Lazare	1927	Toronto, Ontario, Canada			Nitro, The Wing, The Dreamer, Drummy Young, Air Woman	English	Canadian	2007		
Axelle Lenoir	1979	Notre-Dame-du-Lac, Quebec			Si on était, Mertownville	French	Canadian			
Troy Little	1973-03-07	Prince Edward Island			Chiaroscuro	English	Canadian			
Jason Loo		Brampton, Ontario			The Pitiful Human-Lizard, Werewolf by Night, Dazzler	English	Canadian			
Graeme MacKay	1968				Alas & Alack, Gridlock, Editorial cartoons	English	Canadian			
Jed MacKay					Black Cat, Moon Knight, Avengers, X-Men		Canadian			
Duncan Macpherson	1924-09-20	Toronto, Ontario	1993-05-03	Beaverton, Ontario	Editorial cartoons	English				CM
Jay Malone		Kentville, Nova Scotia				English				
Francis Manapul	1979-08-26					English				
Jason Marcy					Jay's Days	English				
Sean Martin	1960-12-29	Hereford, Texas	2020-08-03		Doc and Raider	English				
Ted Martin	1938	Blackpool, England			Pavlov	English	Canadian			
Michael McAdam	1969-04-30	Fredericton, New Brunswick			Thunder, Spectrum, Twilight Detective Agency, Gloaming, Diaperman	English	Canadian			
Bruce McCall	1935	Simcoe, Ontario			New Yorker cartoons	English				
Ted McCall	1901		1975		Men of the Mounted, founder of Anglo-American Publishing, Freelance	English	Canadian	2008		
Owen McCarron	1929	Halifax, Nova Scotia	2005-06-27		Ghost Rider, Spidey Super Stories, Marvel Fun and Games	English	Canadian	2006		
Todd McFarlane	1961-03-16	Calgary, Alberta			Spawn	English	Canadian, American	2011		
Bernie Mireault	1961	Marville, France			The Jam, Mackenzie Queen, Dr. Robot, Bug-eyed Monster	English	Canadian			
Gabriel Morrissette	1959	Montreal, Quebec			Northguard, Angloman, Fleur de Lys	English	Canadian			
Win Mortimer	1919-05-01	Hamilton, Ontario	1998-01-11		Superman, Superboy, Batman, Legion of Super-Heroes, Plastic Man, Supergirl, Scooter, Stanley And His Monster, Spider-Man, Boris Karloff's Tales of Mystery, The Twilight Zone, Supernatural Thrillers.	English	Canadian	2006		
Len Norris	1913	London, England	1997	Langley, British Columbia	Editorial cartoons	English				
Mark Oakley					Thieves and Kings	English	Canadian			
Bryan Lee O'Malley	1979	London, Ontario			Scott Pilgrim	English	Canadian/Korean			
Yanick Paquette	1974					English	Canadian			
Louis Paradis	1959-06-06	Montmagny, Quebec				French	Canadian			
Guillaume Perreault	1985	Rimouski, Quebec			Pet et Répète: La véritable histoire	French	Canadian			
Roy Peterson	1936	Winnipeg, Manitoba	2013		Editorial cartoons	English	Canadian			OC
Dušan Petričić	1946-05-10				Editorial cartoons	English				
Michel Rabagliati	1961	Montréal, Québec			Paul series	French	Canadian			
Adrian Raeside	1957	Dunedin, New Zealand			Editorial cartoons	English				
Steve Requin	1968-07-21	Montréal, Québec			MensuHell	French	Canadian			
Yves Rodier	1967-06-05	Farnham, Québec				French	Canadian			
Vic Roschkov, Sr.	1941	Kiev, Soviet Ukraine			Editorial cartoons	English				
Arn Saba	1947	Vancouver, British Columbia			Neil the Horse	English	Canadian			
Seth	1962-09-16	Clinton, Ontario			Palookaville, It's a Good Life, If You Don't Weaken	English	Canadian			
Mark Shainblum	1963	Montreal, Quebec			Northguard, Angloman, Fleur de Lys	English	Canadian			
Leanne Shapton	1973-06-25					English				
Joe Shuster	1914-07-10	Toronto, Ontario	1992-07-30	Los Angeles, California	Superman	English	Canadian until 1945, American	2005		
Dave Sim	1956-05-17	Hamilton, Ontario			Cerebus	English	Canadian	2006		
James Simpkins	1910-11-26	Winnipeg, Manitoba	2004-02-01	Dundas, Ontario	Jasper the Bear	English	Canadian			
Steve Skroce		Canada				English	Canadian			
Kean Soo		England			Jellaby	English				
Jon St. Ables	1912-12-23	Ulverston, England	1999	Seattle, Washington	Piltdown Pete, Brok Windsor, Bill Speed	English	Canadian	2006		
Ken Steacy	1955-01-08				The Sacred and the Profane, Night and the Enemy, Astro Boy, Johnny Quest, Tempus Fugitive	English	Canadian	2009		
Jay Stephens	1971-03-22	Toronto, Ontario			Chick & Dee, Oh, Brother!	English	Canadian			
Noreen Stevens	1962	Sault Ste. Marie, Ontario			The Chosen Family	English	Canadian			
Cameron Stewart	1967	Toronto, Ontario				English	Canadian			
Philip Street	1959				Fisher	English				
Paul Szep	1941-07-29	Hamilton, Ontario			Editorial cartoons	English	American			
Jillian Tamaki	1980-04-17	Ottawa, Ontario			Skim	English				
Charles Templeton	1915-10-07	Toronto, Ontario	2001-06-07	Toronto, Ontario	Chuck Templeton's Sportraits, sports cartoons	English	Canadian			
Ty Templeton	1962-05-09				Stig's Inferno, Batman Adventures, Justice League	English	Canadian			
Charles Thorson	1890-08-29	Winnipeg, Manitoba	1966-08-07	Vancouver, British Columbia	Bugs Bunny, Elmer Fudd	English	Canadian			
Marcus To	1983-10-20					English	Canadian			
Wyatt Tremblay	1960	Jasper, Alberta			Editorial cartoons	English				
Jim Unger	1937-01-21	London, England	2012-05-26	Saanich, British Columbia	Herman	English	Canadian			
Colin Upton	1960-04-02	Winnipeg, Manitoba				English	Canadian			
Henriette Valium	1959-05-04	Montreal, Canada				English	Canadian			
Peter Whalley	1921-02-21	Brockville, Canada	2007-09-18	Saint-Jérôme, Quebec		English	Canadian		2005	
Ben Wicks	1926-10-01	London, England	2000-09-10		The Outcasts, Wicks, Katie and Orbie	English				CM
Doug Wright II	1917-08-07	Dover, Kent, England	1983		Doug Wright's Family (Nipper)	English			2005	
Avrom Yanovsky	1911	Krivoy Rog, Ukraine	1979			English				

== See also ==
- Canadian comics
- The Great Canadian Comic Books
- Québec comics
