= Luis Parada =

Luis Parada may refer to:

- Luis Parada (lawyer), Salvadoran lawyer and soldier
- Luis Parada (neuroscientist), Colombian neuroscientist and biologist

== Similar names ==
- Louis Paradis, Canadian comic artist
- Luis Paradela, Cuban footballer
- Luis Pardo Céspedes, Spanish manager and writer
- Luis Pardo Villalón, Chilean naval officer
- Luis Parodi, Ecuadorian politician and vice president (1988–1992)
