= Canadian Cartoonist Hall of Fame =

The Giants of the North: The Canadian Cartoonist Hall of Fame
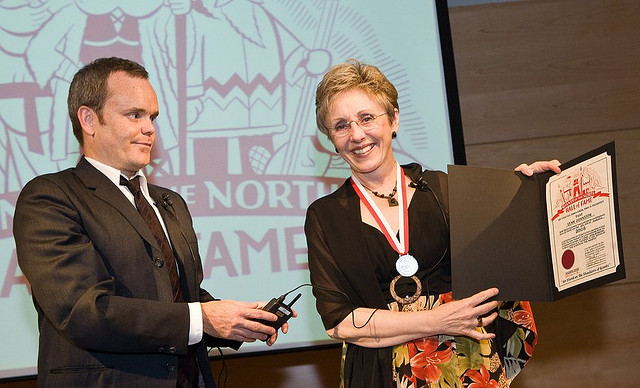
- Brad Mackay (left), Director of the Doug Wright Awards, inducts Lynn Johnston into The Giants of the North: the Canadian Cartoonists Hall of Fame in August 2008
- Location: Toronto Comic Arts Festival (Toronto Marriott Bloor Yorkville)
- Country: Canada
- Hosted by: Scott Thompson, Don McKellar, Dustin Harbin
- Reward: Medal

The Canadian Cartoonist Hall of Fame, formally known as Giants of the North: The Canadian Cartoonist Hall of Fame, honours significant lifelong contributions to the art of cartooning in Canada.

== History and structure ==
The Giants of the North was founded in 2005. The first four members were inducted at The Doug Wright Awards ceremony held during the 2005 Toronto Comic Arts Festival by guest-presenter, comics historian B.K. Munn. New members are inducted annually, chosen by the organizing body of the Wright Awards. As of 2018, there were only four living Giants, with the vast majority of members being inducted posthumously. In 2019, the organizers announced, beginning with the 2019 induction of Fiona Smyth and Alootook Ipellie, The Giants of the North intends to induct two Giants a year; one living and one non-living.

== Symbols ==
Upon admission into The Giants of the North, members are given various insignia of the organization, all designed by the cartoonist Seth. The primary symbol of membership is a circular, silver-coloured medal, emblazoned with a cartoon ink bottle, surmounted by a crown, and surrounded with the legend, "HALL OF FAME ... GIANTS OF THE NORTH", interspersed with a laurel motif. On the verso of the medal is inscribed the recipient's name and the words, "IN RECOGNITION OF A LIFETIME OF OUTSTANDING CANADIAN CARTOONING", followed by a final line indicating the date of induction.

The medal is suspended from a ribbon, meant to be worn around the neck. The ribbon is white and bordered in red stripes, similar to the Canadian national flag. The medal is presented in a red, velvet-lined jewelry case.

With the medal, members are presented with a certificate, encased in a special presentation folder. Under the logo of The Giants of the North, the certificate reads, "So that all shall know, [recipient's name] was received into The Canadian Cartoonist Hall of Fame on [date] in recognition of significant contributions made to the medium of cartooning and to Canadian culture at large, [recipient's name] is registered as a member in the books of "The Giants of the North"." At the bottom of the certificate, a foil stamp of the Doug Wright Awards logo is affixed above the date of induction, followed by the number of the certificate. To the right of the seal is written, "In witness whereas the seal of "The Giants of the North" has been hereto affixed under the signatures of the nominating officers....." followed by space for five signatures.

== Inductees ==
Members, followed by the date of induction:

- Albéric Bourgeois (2005)
- John Wilson Bengough (2005)
- Peter Whalley (2005)
- Doug Wright (2005)
- George Feyer (2006)
- Rand Holmes (2007)
- Lynn Johnston (2008)
- Jimmy Frise (2009)
- Martin Vaughn-James (2010)
- David Boswell (2011)
- Terry Mosher (2012)
- Albert Chartier (2013)
- Artists of the 1940s Canadian Whites Comics (2014):
  - Jack Tremblay
  - Gerald Lazare
  - Murray Karn
  - Mel Crawford
- Merle "Ting" Tingley (2015)
- James Simpkins (2016)
- Katherine Collins (2017)
- Duncan Macpherson (2018)
- Alootook Ipellie (2019)
- Fiona Smyth (2019)
- Walter Ball (2020)
- Fred Kelly (2021)
- Margaret Bloy Graham (2022)
- Henriette Valium (2023)
- Deni Loubert (2024)
- Maurice Vellekoop (2024)
- Lou Skuce (2025)
- Richard Comely (2025)
- Arch Dale (2026)
- Emily Hearn (2026)
- Mark Thurman (2026)
