= Sandy Carruthers =

Canadian comics artist

- Born: May 11, 1962 (age 64) Halifax, Nova Scotia, Canada
- Area: Artist
- Notable works: original Men in Black comic book series Canadiana: the New Spirit of Canada

Sandy Carruthers is a Canadian artist best known for his work as the first illustrator of the original Men in Black comic book series, and as creator of the webcomic series, Canadiana: the New Spirit of Canada.

== Early life and education ==
Carruthers was born on May 11, 1962, in Halifax, Nova Scotia. He trained at Holland College between 1979–1981 in its Commercial Design Program, where he later taught full-time for 25 years until he retired in 2017. He also attended Sheridan College in Ontario, taking its Illustration program, and took a correspondence course with The Joe Kubert School.

== Career ==
Carruthers first started working in comics at Malibu Graphics including the illustration of The Men in Black, written by Lowell Cunningham, which would later be adapted into the Men in Black movie franchise. He also worked on Captain Canuck. He worked as the Editorial Cartoonist for the Charlottetown Guardian newspaper. He published a book of his editorial cartoons entitled Sh-It Happened.

He has worked on several graphic novels for Graphic Universe, a division of Lerner Publishing Group (Minneapolis, U.S.) including Yu the Great, written by Paul D. Storrie, Sunjata: Warrior King of Mali (a 13th-century West African story), written by Justine and Ron Fontes. He also illustrated three graphic novels in the style of interactive storytelling: Terror in Ghost Mansion (Paul D. Storrie, writer), "School of Evil" (Marie P. Croall, writer) and "Peril at Summerland Park" (Paul D. Storrie, writer).

Beginning in 2004, he worked on the webcomic Canadiana, also known as the New Spirit of Canada. It drew heavily on the traditions of the superhero genre, centred on the adventures and personal life of the titular female superhero. Penciller Jeff Alward and scripter Mark Shainblum (known for Northguard and Angloman) and artist Brenda Hickey have also worked on the series.

Carruthers has worked with the Charlton NEO group: a revival effort to bring back Charlton Comics. His art can be found in Charlton Arrow # 1, 2, and 3 with the reworking of Spookman (with writer Roger McKenzie and editor Mort Todd), a public-domain character created by Pat Boyette in 1968. He illustrated "Travest: Spirit Talker", a western he and Roger McKenzie co-created for Charlton Wild Frontier #1, and a horror story "Skin in the Game" with writer Paul Kupperberg.

He has worked with writer Nicola R. White and illustrator Kara Brauen as both colorist and letterer on the comic book series Wild Rose.

In September, 2018, Carruthers started (with fellow comic creators Robert Doan and Greg Webster)Sandstone Comics, a small publishing house in Prince Edward Island, Canada.
