= Bernie Mireault =

Canadian comic book artist and writer (1961–2024)

- Born: Bernard Edward Mireault; June 27, 1961 Marville, France
- Died: September 2024 (aged 63)
- Areas: Writer, Penciller, Inker, Colourist
- Notable works: The Jam
- Collaborators: Max Douglas; Mike Allred
- Awards: Canadian Comic Book Creator Hall of Fame (2020)

Bernard Edward Mireault (June 27, 1961 – September 2024) was a Canadian comic book artist and writer.

== Biography ==
Mireault was born in Marville, France, where his parents were stationed while working for the Canadian Forces. In 1963, the Mireault family moved back to Canada. Raised as an Anglophone in Rawdon, Quebec, he was an active participant in the Montreal underground comix scene, participating in the comix jams since their inception and contributing to local zines and underground publications. At the same time he worked in the mainstream comics industry as an artist and colourist, as well as an animator and illustrator.

Among his comics works are Dr. Robot, Mackenzie Queen, Bug-eyed Monster, The Blair Witch Chronicles, Left Alone: The Rustin Parr Killings, Two Fisted Science: Safecracker, When is a Door? The Tragic Though Amusing History of Clay Face II, and the creator-owned comic The Jam, first published as a backup feature in Northguard from Matrix Graphic Series, and then published in its own title in 1985 by various publishers starting with Matrix Graphic Series and then Comico, Slave Labor Graphics, Tundra Publishing, Dark Horse Comics, and Caliber Press.

Mireault illustrated the seminal Riddler story "When Is a Door," written by Neil Gaiman and published in Secret Origins Special #1 (Oct. 1989), in which the Riddler makes a meta-commentary about the dark turn of modern comics compared to those of the Silver Age. As Brian Cronin of CBR wrote, "It'll likely be the comic book story that Mireault will be most remembered for among more casual comic book fans, and if you're going to be remembered for a single story, then this is the one to be remembered for, as it is a brilliant examination of the early days of the 'grim and gritty' superhero era."

Mireault served as the artist on the story arc "The Devil Within" for Matt Wagner's Grendel comics in the late 1980s – notably coloured by Joe Matt. Mireault coloured several Grendel story arcs: "Warchild," "Devil's Hammer," "Devil in Our Midst," "Devil Tracks," "Devil Eyes," "Devil by the Deed," and "The Devil's Apprentice." As a colourist he had a long-standing collaborative relationship with Salgood Sam a.k.a. Max Douglas, a fellow Canadian artist. Together they worked on Realworlds: Wonder Woman, Muties #6: The Patriot Game, and Revolution on the Planet of the Apes.

Another long-standing collaborative relationship was with Mike Allred, with whom he produced Madman Jam: The Fall of the House of Escher, Creatures of the Id, and The Everyman. Mireault's character Dr. Robot first appeared as a back-up in Mike Allred's Madman.

Mireault had a part-time band called Bug-Eyed Monster, for which he wrote songs. Fellow cartoonist Howard Chackowicz was also a member of Bug-Eyed Monster.

Mireault committed suicide in September 2024, at the age of 63. He was survived by two sons and three sisters.

== Reception ==
Comics critic Timothy Callahan has argued that Mireault is one of the unheralded creators who helped bring in the Modern Age of Comic Books:

Yet there's one creator who doesn't get mentioned nearly as often. A writer/artist who was combining the high Romanticism of the fantastic with the mundane life on the street as well as any of the others. A comic book creator whose visual style has rarely been duplicated, but whose sensibilities seem to predict the coming of cartoonists as diverse as Mike Mignola and Dash Shaw. I'm talking, of course, about Bernie Mireault.

== Awards ==
Mireault was inducted into the Canadian Comic Book Creator Hall of Fame as part of the Joe Shuster Awards in 2020.

== Bibliography ==
- Mackenzie Queen
- The Jam
- Dr. Robot
