= Gabriel Morrissette =

Canadian illustrator, animator and comic book artist

- Born: September 26, 1959 (age 67) Val-d'Or, Quebec
- Area: Cartoonist
- Notable works: "Daisy Dreamer", "Fleur de Lys", Northguard
- Awards: Canadian Comic Book Hall of Fame, 2017

Gabriel Morrissette (born September 26, 1959) is a Canadian illustrator, animator, and comic book artist from Montreal, Quebec, Canada.

== Early life ==
Gabriel Morrissette was born in Val-d'Or, Quebec and studied animation at Concordia University.

== Career ==
Morrissette co-created Northguard, Fleur de Lys, and Angloman with Mark Shainblum.

Morrissette has worked for several comic book publishers, including DC Comics and Marvel Comics, and has illustrated such characters as Checkmate, Doc Savage, Ragman, and Spider-Man 2099. In 1992, he was one of the artists on the debut issue of Team Titans. He worked for Jackfruit Press on their Prime Minister series and drew the "Daisy Dreamer" feature in Chickadee magazine for 16 years. His Fleur de Lys character appeared on a Canadian postage stamp in 1995. He drew one issue of the Revolution on the Planet of the Apes limited series for Mr. Comics in 2006.

His animation work includes The Savage Dragon and The Boy.

== Awards ==
Morrissette was inducted into the Canadian Comic Book Hall of Fame in 2017.

== Bibliography ==
=== Adventure Publications ===
- Netherworlds #1–6 (1988)

=== Caliber Press ===
- Gaijin #1 (1990)
- Jazz Age Chronicles #3 (1990)
- Northguard: The ManDes Conclusion #1–3 (1989–1990)
- Roulette #1 (1990)

=== Chapterhouse Comics Group ===
- Chapterhouse Archives: Northguard #1–4 (2016)

=== Comic Legends Legal Defense Fund ===
- The True North #1 (1988)
- The True North II #1 (1991)

=== Dark Horse Comics ===
- GoGirl! #1 (one page) (2002)

=== DC Comics ===
- Checkmate #31–33 (1990–1991)
- Deathstroke, the Terminator #22–23, Annual #1 (1992–1993)
- Doc Savage vol. 2 #15–16, Annual #1 (1989–1990)
- Hawk and Dove #25, Annual #2 (1991)
- Justice League Task Force #4 (1993)
- Lobo Annual #2 (1994)
- New Titans Annual #8 (1992)
- Primal Force #6 (1995)
- Ragman: Cry of the Dead #1–6 (1993–1994)
- Team Titans #1 (1992)

==== Paradox Press ====
- The Big Book of Hoaxes (1996)
- The Big Book of Urban Legends (1994)

=== Kitchen Sink Press ===
- Melody #1–8 (1988–1993)

=== Marvel Comics ===
- Saint Sinner #7 (1994)
- Spider-Man 2099 Special #1 (1995)

=== Matrix Graphic Series ===
- The Jam Special #1 (1987)
- MacKenzie Queen #1–5 (1985–1986)
- New Triumph (Featuring Northguard) #1–5 (1984–1986)

=== Mr. Comics ===
- Revolution on the Planet of the Apes #2 (2006)

=== NBM Publishing ===
- Skin Tight Orbit #2 (1995)

=== Nuage Editions ===
- Angloman #1–2 (1995–1996)

=== Owlkids ===
- Chickadee #v33#1, #v33#3, #v34#7 (2011–2012)

=== Quadrant ===
- Quadrant #2, 5 (1984–1985)

=== Renegade Press ===
- Gene Day's Black Zeppelin #4–5 (1986)
- Jacques Boivin's Love Fantasy #1 (1987)

=== Scarlet Rose Productions ===
- Variations on the Theme #5 (1997)

=== Valiant Comics ===
- Secret Weapons #10 (1994)

=== Vortex Comics ===
- NASCAR Adventures #4 (1992)

== See also ==
- Canadian Comics Creators
