= Walter Ball =

Walter Ball may refer to:

- Walter Ball (alderman) (died 1598), 16th-century Irish merchant and public official
- Walter Ball (baseball) (1877–1946), Negro league baseball player
- Walter Ball (cartoonist) (1911–1995), Canadian cartoonist
