= Chapter house (disambiguation) =

A chapter house or chapterhouse is a meeting building or room that is part of a cathedral or other religious structure.

Chapter house, chapter house or chapterhouse may also refer to:

- Chapterhouse (band), a British band 1987–1994
- Chapter house (Navajo Nation), an administrative, communal meeting place
- Chapterhouse, the namesake planet in Chapterhouse: Dune, a 1985 science fiction novel by Frank Herbert
- Chapter House, a building associated with the American Woman's League
- Chapter house, a building associated with American college and university fraternities and sororities
- Chapterhouse Comics, a Canadian comic publishing company
