= Merle Tingley =

Canadian editorial cartoonist

Merle "Ting" Tingley (July 9, 1921 – June 4, 2017) was a Canadian cartoonist who was the main editorial cartoonist for the London, Ontario newspaper, The London Free Press, from 1948 to 1986 as well as being syndicated for 60 other publications as well.

In World War II, Tingley was the official cartoonist for the Canadian Army magazine, Khaki, and a contributor for the overseas army newspaper, The Maple Leaf. After his discharge, Tingley toured the country on his motorcycle hoping to find work as a cartoonist only to have the various newspapers he applied to turn him down. When Tingley reached London, Ontario, he was out of funds and had to obtain a menial job at the London Free Press with a friend's help. However, Tingley's fortunes improved when an editor on that paper noticed a cartoon Tingley drew of the mayor during the municipal election. The editor was impressed enough with that work to arrange to have Tingley become the resident editorial cartoonist.

Tingley's mascot was a worm character called Luke Worm who usually was present in each of his cartoons.

Tingley's honours include the National Newspaper Award for editorial cartooning in 1955, National Headliner Award for Editorial Cartoon year for 1965 and induction into the Canadian Cartoonist Hall of Fame in 2015. In addition, collections of his work are stored at the University of Western Ontario and at Library and Archives Canada in Ottawa.

After his retirement in 1986, his artistic contributions have been commemorated since 2014 at the Ting Comic And Graphic Arts Festival in London, Ontario. It is an annual three-week arts festival at The TAP Centre for Creativity devoted to cartooning and sequential art which includes gallery displays of various local Canadian artists including selections of Tingley's art, as well as various activities devoted to the medium and is scheduled to conclude with the annual Free Comic Book Day event.
