= Eric Nicol =

Canadian writer (1919–2011)

Eric Patrick Nicol (December 28, 1919 – February 2, 2011) was a Canadian writer, best known as a longtime humour columnist for the Vancouver, British Columbia newspaper The Province. He also published over 40 books, both original works and compilations of his humour columns, and won the Stephen Leacock Memorial Medal for Humour three times.

== Early life ==
Nicol was born on December 28, 1919, in Kingston, Ontario. In 1921, his family relocated to British Columbia. Nicol attended Lord Byng Secondary School and the University of British Columbia, where he studied French. At UBC, Nicol met future journalist and author Pierre Berton, then editor of the popular student paper The Ubyssey, who encouraged Nicol to write a humour column in the paper. The shy Nicol submitted his columns under the pseudonym Jabez. In 1941, he received a Bachelor of Arts degree from the university.

Following military service in the Second World War, Nicol returned to the University of British Columbia and earned a Master of Arts degree. He then studied at the Sorbonne in France, and lived in London, England for a few years writing comedy for the BBC.

In 1951, he returned to Vancouver, where for several decades he served as a regular columnist for city's newspaper The Province. He also wrote numerous radio comedy plays for CBC Radio.

Nicol lived in Vancouver until his death on February 2, 2011. He was married to writer Mary Razzell, and had three children with his first wife, Myrl Nicol.

== Awards and recognition ==
- 1951: winner, Stephen Leacock Memorial Medal for Humour The Roving I
- 1956: winner, Stephen Leacock Memorial Medal for Humour Shall We Join the Ladies?
- 1958: winner, Stephen Leacock Memorial Medal for Humour Girdle Me a Globe
- 1999: finalist, Hubert Evans Non-Fiction Prize, Anything for a Laugh: Memoirs
- 2000: appointed Member of the Order of Canada

== Bibliography ==
- 1947: Sense and Nonsense (Ryerson)
- 1950: The Roving I (Ryerson)
- 1953: Twice Over Lightly, illustrator James Simpkins (Ryerson)
- 1955: Shall We Join the Ladies?, illustrator James Simpkins (Ryerson)
- 1957: Girdle Me a Globe, illustrator James Simpkins (Ryerson)
- 1959: In Darkest Domestica, illustrator James Simpkins (Ryerson)
- 1961: with Peter Whalley, Say, Uncle: A Completely Uncalled-for History of the U.S. (Harper)
- 1962: compilation, A Herd of Yaks: The Best of Eric Nicol (Ryerson)
- 1963: with Peter Whalley, Russia, Anyone?: A Completely Uncalled-for History of the USSR (Harper and Row)
- 1963: Twice Over Lightly (Ryerson)
- 1964: Space Age Go Home! (Ryerson)
- 1965: (An Uninhibited) History of Canada, illustrator Peter Whalley (Musson)
  - 1968 reissue (Musson)
- 1966: with Peter Whalley, 100 Years of What? (Ryerson)
- 1968: A Scar is Born (Ryerson)
- 1970: Vancouver (Doubleday)
  - 1978 reissue: Vancouver (Doubleday) ISBN 0-385-14329-X
- 1971: Don't Move: Renovate Your House and Make Social Contacts (McClelland)
- 1972: The Clam Made a Face (Firebrand)
- 1972: compilation edited by Alan Walker, Still a Nicol: the Best of Eric Nicol (McGraw-Hill Ryerson) ISBN 0-07-092773-1
- 1973: Beware the Quickly Who (Playwrights Co-op)
- 1973: One Man's Media and How to Write for Them (Holt, Rinehart and Winston) ISBN 0-03-929991-0
- 1974: Letters to my Son, illustrator Roy Peterson (Macmillan) ISBN 0-7705-1216-X
- 1975: with Peter Whalley, There's a Lot of it Going Around (Doubleday)
- 1975: Three Plays: Like Father Like Fun, Pillar of Sand, The Fourth Monkey (Talonbooks)
- 1977: with Peter Whalley, Canada, Cancelled Because of Lack of Interest (Hurtig) ISBN 0-88830-139-1
- 1978: with Dave More, The Joy of Hockey (Hurtig) ISBN 0-88830-156-1
- 1980: with Dave More, The Joy of Football (Hurtig) ISBN 0-88830-183-9
- 1982: with Dave More, Golf, the Agony and the Ecstasy (Hurtig) ISBN 0-88830-218-5
- 1983: Canadide: A Patriotic Satire (Macmillan) ISBN 0-7715-9783-5
- 1984: with Dave More, Tennis It Serves You Right (Hurtig) ISBN 0-88830-266-5
- 1985: How to-- ! : How to be Smarter, Slimmer, Happier, Richer, Sexier—and so Successful that You'll Never Need Another How-To Book (Macmillan) ISBN 0-7715-9694-4
- 1986: with Dave More, The U.S. or Us: What's the Difference, eh? (Hurtig) ISBN 0-88830-296-7
- 1989: Dickens of the Mounted: The Astounding Lost-Long Letters of Inspector F. Dickens, NWMP, 1874–1886 (McClelland and Stewart) ISBN 0-7710-6807-7
- 1992: Back Talk: A Book for Bad Back Sufferers and Those Who Love (Put Up With) Them, illustrator Graham Pilsworth (McClelland and Stewart) ISBN 0-7710-6809-3
- 1996: Skiing is Believing (Johnson Gorman) ISBN 0-921835-23-X
- 1998: Anything for a Laugh: Memoirs, autobiography (Harbour) ISBN 1-55017-187-9
- 1999: When Nature Calls: Life at a Gulf Island Cottage (Harbour) ISBN 1-55017-210-7
- 2001: The Casanova Sexicon: A Manual for Liberated Men (Ronsdale) ISBN 0-921870-88-4
- 2003: with Peter Whalley, Canadian Politics Unplugged (Dundurn Press) ISBN 9781550024661
- 2004: Old Is In: A Guide for Aging Boomers (Dundurn Press) ISBN 9781550025248
- 2010: Script Tease - A Wordsmith's Waxings on Life and Writing (Dundurn Press) ISBN 9781554887071
