= Martin Vaughn-James =

Cartoonist, painter and illustrator

- Born: 5 December 1943 Bristol, England
- Died: 3 July 2009 (aged 65) Provence, France
- Area: Cartoonist
- Notable works: The Cage
- Awards: Canadian Cartoonist Hall of Fame

Martin Vaughn-James (5 December 1943 – 3 July 2009) was a cartoonist, painter, and illustrator. After spending time in London, Toronto, Tokyo and Paris, he lived for a long time in Brussels.

He is best known for a series of graphic novels he published while living in Canada in the 1970s: Elephant (1970), The Projector (1971), The Park (1972) and The Cage (1975). The Cage is perhaps his best known work, the subject of critical study, including a 2002 monograph by French critic Thierry Groensteen, La construction de la cage, and has been reprinted in several editions in French and English.

From the mid-1980s, Vaughn-James devoted himself primarily to painting, exhibiting regularly in France, Belgium and Germany. He was the co-founder with the painter Hastaire of the Groupe Mémoires (1999) group of painters.

== Biography ==
Son of Clifford Howard James, an itinerant teacher, and Kathleen Florence Stevens, he was born in Bristol, England on 6 December 1943. He and his family moved to Australia in 1958 where he studied for four years at the National Art School in Sydney. On May 3, 1967 he married poet Sarah McCoy (Noddy), in Kensington, London.

In 1968, the couple immigrated to Toronto, Canada.

After returning to England in 1977, in September 1978, they settled permanently in France in Paris. In 1991, they moved to "domaine de la Hêtraie" in Doudeville, and then to "La Cour Rabault" in Calvados at La Chapelle-Yvon. They returned to Paris in 1995.

In 2006, after selling their Parisian apartment, they immigrated again, to live in place Louis Morichar Saint-Gilles, Belgium.

He died in Provence on 3 July 2009.

== Graphic novels ==
While living in Toronto, Vaughn-James published his first surrealist cartoon in the monthly Saturday Night magazine. He would go on to provide monthly cartoons and comic strips (from one to eight panels without text) for the magazine until August 1980. From May, 1970, he also contributed many illustrations for articles, beginning with Myrna Kostash's "Canada's no place to be a guerrilla".

In the same issue appeared an ad for Vaughn-James' Elephant, published by New Press [84 Sussex avenue, Toronto 179] for $3.50, and advertised as a "boovie", Vaughn-James's neologism combining the words "book" and "movie". In Vaughn-James's words from the ad:

« The age of reason has inflicted man with an asphyxia of the mind. We live in an age of corporate bodies. We experience collectively approved emotions on a national scale. Any deviation is considered neurotic, insane or subversive. Our individual vision has been sacrificed for an amazingly limited range of collective perceptions which we learn from childhood by repetition and limitation the way a parrot learns to swear. Our society believes in words, not people or things. We are abstract. When we perceive an object or person or feeling we see a word first, and, if we are not already too far gone, the thing later. Our world is no longer populated with trees and storms and stones and blood but the words « trees », « storms », « stones », « blood ». Our mania for equality and affluence achieved through systems of logic and order has meant that we must reject our natural chaos and all accept the same way of perceiving the so-called « real-world ». Elephant is NOT a fantasy. The modern world is a fantasy; a fantasy of our reason, our logic, our insistence on problems and solutions. Elephant is a man living subjectively, illogically and mysteriously. Elephant is a confused whimper in a corridor of steam-irons and bank buildings. Elephant is a heart in a cardboard box, its beat almost inaudible as it stands in an empty parking-lot »

Four pages of the book are previewed in the June, 1970 issue of The Canadian Forum, alongside Vaughn-James' explication of the term "boovie":

« The boovie: it is not a book, not a comic-strip, not a de-animated cartoon, not a scenario for a film. It is a new form, which, granted, like any new form owes something to those already in existence. The Boovie is primarily a visual experience. The book has been transformed into an object in its own right. It is not, any more, an abstract vehicle for ideas or feelings with no existence of its own, but a thing in itself. Unlike certain other forms (painting) it is truly democratic for it is a multiple object available to all in the same form at the same price. It exists in time, like the novel and the film, and in space, like the painting and the sculpture. Art is Anarchy of the Spirit. »

The book itself is essentially a comic, with large, full-page panels and minimal text, and using many tools of the cartoonist. As the critic Andrei Molotui notes, ""Elephant," especially, can be seen as a (non-proto) graphic novel, arising directly out of the underground comix movement. Admittedly, it is experimental, and it substitutes a kind of modernist strangeness for the usual humor of the underground; nevertheless, it is in complete control of the language of comics."

Vaughn-James' next book was published by Toronto's Coach House Books in 1971. The Projector is "a novel-length story told in a dissociated second-person (the “you” of the narrative captions is never apparent in the images) where part of the broad-ranging, discontinuous narrative involves Vaughn-James's bald-pated stand-in traveling toward, and trying to avoid, a monolithic, meat-grinder-like projector."

Coach House also released 1972's The Park: A Mystery; at 32-pages long, Vaughn-James' most comic book-like publication, despite being wordless.

In 1975, Coach House released The Cage: A Visual Novel, the book that much of Martin Vaughn-James' reputation rests on. Composed entirely of single page illustrations or panels, with short typeset pieces of text positioned at the top of each page, the book is an enigmatic story without human characters that examines a series of deserted rooms and outdoor spaces, in a seemingly post-apocalyptic landscape. The critic Domingos Isabelinho has suggested the book's main character is the image of bed that appears on several pages throughout, noting that, "The Cage is a book about our desire to communicate (in the book we were substituted by, we are made of, modern communicating, recording, and measuring devices), our struggle to perpetuate our memory, our ideas, and our feelings against something that's sublimely far bigger than ourselves: Time. We are cages trying to reach other cages. We, the cages, and our pathetic inventions, will inevitably be destroyed. Even something as grandiose as a pyramid will eventually disappear." The book has been said to be influenced by the nouveau roman writers of the 1950s and 60s. The Cage has been reprinted several times in France and was reprinted in 2013 by Coach House.

In addition to his longer comics work, during the 1970s and 1980s, Vaughn-James created several shorter comics-style pieces for various publications, as well as many illustrations and book covers. He is also the author of two prose novels.

== Honours ==
Martin Vaughn-James was posthumously inducted into Giants of the North: The Canadian Cartoonist Hall of Fame in 2010.

== Exhibitions ==
- 1975 - "Image, Word, Sequence" - Art Gallery of Ontario, Toronto
- 1976 - Gallery Cocorocchia, Toronto
- 1982 - Galerie Art Contemporain, Paris
- 1984 - Librairie Macondo, Bruxelles

== Bibliography ==
=== Books ===
| Year | Title | Publisher | ISBN | Notes |
|---|---|---|---|---|
| 1970 | Elephant | New Press | | |
| 1971 | The Projector: A Visual Novel | Coach House Books | | |
| 1973 | The Park | Coach House Books | | |
| 1975 | The Cage | Coach House Books | | |
| 1984 | L'Enquêteur | Futuropolis | 978-2737654442 | |
| 2013 | The Cage | Coach House Books | 9781552452875 | introduction by Seth (cartoonist) |
