= Fleur de Lys (superhero) =

Canadian comic book superhero

Fleur de Lys is a superheroine from Quebec and an ally of Northguard, created in 1984 by Mark Shainblum and Gabriel Morrissette in the comic New Triumph featuring Northguard. The name of the character is inspired by the heraldic symbol of the fleur de lys, which is the official emblem of Quebec and a prominent part of the Flag of Quebec. The character was honored with a Canadian postage stamp in 1995, with fellow superheroes Superman, Nelvana of the Northern Lights, Johnny Canuck and Captain Canuck.

Fleur de Lys uses a fleur-de-lys-shaped, non-lethal light saber to vanquish her foes. The character's civilian identity is martial-arts expert Manon Deschamps, from Quebec.

In 2010, Fleur de Lys was featured in an animated web series, Heroes of the North, where it was revealed that the Quebecois heroine has brothers who are separatist terrorists.
