= Fiona Smyth =

Canadian cartoonist (born 1964)

- Born: 1964 (age 61–62); Montreal, Canada
- Occupations: Cartoonist and illustrator
- Known for: Cheez
- Notable work: Nocturnal Emissions

Fiona Smyth (born 1964) is a Canadian cartoonist, illustrator, and comics educator.

== Biography ==
Born in Montreal, Smyth was educated at a Catholic girls' school before her family moved to Toronto. After graduating from the art program at Central Technical School, she took a degree from the Ontario College of Art in 1986. She began creating comics as a student, inspired in part by the work of Keith Haring and Chester Brown.

Smyth established herself as a painter and muralist (including designing the facade of the iconic Sneaky Dee's music venue) in Toronto, often incorporating comics and zines into her practice, stating "“Even my earliest shows, I would make zines to sell. So I would have an art show but make a mini-zine to sell, because people might not be able to afford a painting, but they could afford a zine.”

Along with collaborating with schoolmates Maurice Vellekoop and Seth, Smyth also contributed solo work to many comics anthologies and zines. Vortex Comics published four issues of her comic book series Nocturnal Emissions between 1991 and 1994. Her longrunning weekly comic strip Cheez began in Exclaim! Magazine and ran for ten years (1992–2002).

Smyth has been an instructor at OCAD University since 2006. She was inducted into the Giants of the North: The Canadian Cartoonist Hall of Fame in 2019.

Her book with Cory Silverberg, Sex is a Funny Word, appeared on the American Library Association's Top 10 Most Challenged Books list for 2017 and as 20 on the Top 100 Most Frequently Challenged Books for 2010-2019.

== Awards ==
- 2014 Lambda Literary Awards Finalist for What Makes a Baby in LGBT Children/Young Adult
- 2016 Stonewall Book Award Honor Book in Children's and Young Adult Literature for Sex is a Funny Word
- 2016 American Library Association Notable Children's Book Award for Sex is a Funny Word
- 2016 Norma Fleck Award for Canadian Children's Non-Fiction for Sex is a Funny Word
- 2016 Joe Shuster Award/ Canada's National Comic Book Award Nominee for Sex is a Funny Word
- 2016 Canadian Children's Book Centre's Best Books for Kids and Teens Award for Sex is a Funny Word
- 2016 Association for Library Service to Children Notable Book for Sex is a Funny Word
- 2016 Rainbow Book List for Sex is a Funny Word

== Bibliography ==
=== Books and collections ===
Year	Title	Publisher	ISBN	Notes
2001	Cheez	Pedlar Press	978-0968652220	collecting comic strip work from Exclaim! Magazine
2011	The Never Weres	Annick Press	978-1554512843	graphic novel
2013	What Makes a Baby	Seven Stories Press	978-1609804855	with Cory Silverberg
2015	Sex is a Funny Word	Seven Stories Press	978-1609806064	with Cory Silverberg
2018	Somnambulance	Koyama Press	978-1927668542	career retrospective collection
