= WireTap (radio program) =

Canadian radio show

- Genre: Comedy
- Running time: 27 minutes
- Country of origin: Canada
- Language: English
- Home station: CBC Radio One
- Syndicates: Public Radio International; NPR
- Hosted by: Jonathan Goldstein
- Created by: Jonathan Goldstein
- Written by: Tony Asimakopoulos; Howard Chackowicz; Gregor Ehrlich; John Hodgman; Joshua Karpati; Heather O'Neill; David Rakoff; Jon Tucker
- Produced by: Wendy Dorr; Carolyn Warren; Mira Burt-Wintonick; Cristal Duhaime
- Executive producer: Jonathan Goldstein
- Recording studio: Montreal, Canada
- Original release: July 3, 2004 – August 29, 2015
- Audio format: Monophonic
- Website: www.cbc.ca/wiretap

WireTap is a half-hour-long radio show which aired on CBC Radio One from 2004 until 2015. An hour-long version of WireTap was distributed in the United States by Public Radio International. The show was hosted by Jonathan Goldstein, former producer of This American Life, and featured stories that were told as if over the phone with Goldstein.

The show fell into what had traditionally been CBC Radio One's comedy slot on Sunday afternoons, replacing Madly Off in All Directions, which moved to a different time slot. WireTap has been described as "a weekly half-hour of conversation, storytelling and introspection, culled from equal parts real-world experience and the warp of Goldstein's imagination." Each show usually followed a particular investigative theme; show titles include: "Life Lessons", "Reach for the Top", "Prized Possessions" and "Our Fathers".

The series began in the summer of 2004 as a 10-episode experiment, after which it moved to its own regular time slot. It was recorded out of CBC's Montreal studios.

As of 2008, WireTap had a weekly listenership of 350,000. In 2009, the show became available as a podcast.

On 19 August 2015, Goldstein announced that the show was ending after an 11-year run.

CBC has announced that during the summer of 2020, "57 selected episodes from WireTap's catalog" would be released as a podcast, with one episode airing on CBC Radio One each Monday night.

== See also ==
- List of WireTap episodes
