= List of WireTap episodes =

This is a list of WireTap episodes by season. Episodes could be listened to on the live CBC Radio internet streams at several times on the broadcast day due to the multiple time zones. At the beginning of Season 6, WireTap was made available for weekly download as a podcast and past seasons are available for purchase on iTunes.

Contents: Season 1 – Season 2 – Season 3 – Season 4 – Season 5 – Season 6 – Season 7 – Season 8 – Season 9 – Season 10 – Season 11

== Season 1 ==
- 2004-07-03 It's Over
- 2004-07-10 Positive Thinking
- 2004-07-17 Tell It Like It Is
- 2004-07-24 Obsessions
- 2004-07-31 Diaries
- 2004-08-07 The First Thing That Comes to Mind
- 2004-08-14 Broken Telephone
- 2004-08-21 Messiah '83
- 2004-08-28 The Watcher
- 2004-09-04 What's Past is Past
- 2004-09-18 Canadian Content
- 2004-09-25 Let's Pretend
- 2004-10-02 Bullies
- 2004-10-09 Modern Language
- 2004-10-23 Our Fathers
- 2004-10-30 Halloween Special
- 2004-11-06 Old Scores
- 2004-11-20 Generation Gap
- 2004-11-27 There's No Business
- 2004-12-11 Of Man and Beast
- 2004-12-18 On the Beach
- 2005-02-12 The Call-in Show
- 2005-02-19 How I Became so Hostile
- 2005-03-05 Do Your Little Radio Show
- 2005-03-12 Movin' On
- 2005-03-19 The Wind at the End of the World
- 2005-04-02 Haters
- 2005-04-09 Vacation
- 2005-04-16 Confessions
- 2005-04-30 What I've Learned
- 2005-05-07 Prized Possessions
- 2005-05-14 Solving Quebec's Problems
- 2005-05-28 Life Lessons
- 2005-06-04 Reach For the Top
- 2005-06-11 The Big Shot

== Season 2 ==
- 2005-09-18 The Believers
- 2005-09-25 Come on Get Happy
- 2005-10-02 Seduction
- 2005-10-09 Do It Yourself Fun Time
- 2005-10-16 Object of Affection
- 2005-10-23 Get With It
- 2005-11-06 Performance
- 2005-11-13 The Art of Charity
- 2005-11-20 One of a Kind
- 2005-12-04 We are Not Supermen
- 2005-12-11 New Technologies
- 2005-12-18 Compassion
- 2006-01-15 I Can See You Through the Radio
- 2006-01-22 Childhood's Promise
- 2006-01-29 A Listening Ear
- 2006-02-12 A World of Possibility
- 2006-02-19 The Bat and the Weasels
- 2006-02-26 Who Is the Mud Dog?
- 2006-03-12 The Measure of a Man
- 2006-03-19 Career Opportunities
- 2006-03-26 Forsaken
- 2006-04-16 Samson and Delilah
- 2006-04-23 Gentleman's Guide to Grooming
- 2006-05-07 Mr. Helpful
- 2006-05-14 The Lothario
- 2006-05-21 A Bottle of Seltzer
- 2006-06-04 Goody Two Shoes
- 2006-06-10 This One's For the Children
- 2006-06-25 10,000 Kilograms of Radio - The Best of Season 2

== Season 3 ==
- 2006-09-10 Carpe Diem
- 2006-09-17 Love Is Just Around the Corner
- 2006-09-24 Family Album
- 2006-10-08 Man Versus Himself
- 2006-10-15 Selling Out
- 2006-10-22 Emergency Measures
- 2006-11-05 Noah's Ark
- 2006-11-12 Utopia
- 2006-11-19 A Secret History of Famous Friends
- 2006-12-10 A Fresh New Voice
- 2006-12-17 Morty and God
- 2007-01-14 Don't Go Changing
- 2007-01-21 Behind the Curtain
- 2007-01-28 Soul mate
- 2007-02-11 Just Relax
- 2007-02-18 Listen to Your Heart
- 2007-02-25 As Seen on TV
- 2007-03-11 Treat Me Right
- 2007-03-18 Everyday Magic
- 2007-03-25 Modern Times
- 2007-04-08 Love Thy Neighbour
- 2007-04-15 The Monkey, the Leopard and the Kitten
- 2007-04-22 A Dream of Life
- 2007-05-06 My Weekend in Dragon's Throat
- 2007-05-12 Brief Interviews with Confused Men - The Best of Season 3

== Season 4 ==
- 2007-09-09 A Catalogue of Previous Universes
- 2007-09-16 Picasso Goldstein
- 2007-09-23 Far-Away Places
- 2007-10-07 How to be Funny
- 2007-10-14 Protect Yourself
- 2007-10-21 Mending the Past
- 2007-11-04 Fortune's Fool
- 2007-11-18 The Tortoise and the Bunny
- 2007-11-25 The New Josh
- 2007-12-02 The Wolf Boy, the Monkey Boy, and the Daddy's Boy
- 2007-12-16 Time to Face The World
- 2007-12-23 The Two Marys
- 2008-01-13 David and Goliath
- 2008-01-20 Helping Johnny
- 2008-01-27 Do Me a Solid
- 2008-02-10 Negative Scanning
- 2008-02-17 Fake It Until You Make It
- 2008-02-24 King David Part Two: David and Bathsheba
- 2008-03-09 Heaven and Hell
- 2008-03-16 Help Me, Doctor
- 2008-03-23 Private Life, Public Performance
- 2008-04-06 Life and Afterlife
- 2008-04-13 Man is the Rope Between the Ordinary and the Extraordinary
- 2008-04-20 Golden Calves and Sacred Cows
- 2008-05-04 The Quick Fix
- 2008-05-11 Songs of Sorrow
- 2008-05-18 Klosterman's Questions
- 2008-05-25 The Lives of Bugs and Men: The Best of Season 4

== Season 5 ==
- 2008-09-07 Life is Lovely
- 2008-09-14 Where Did All the Spaniards Go?
- 2008-09-21 I Can't Find the Books
- 2008-10-05 Where Do Babies Come From and Where Do Babies Go?
- 2008-10-12 The Fox and the Hedgehog
- 2008-10-19 The Hangover
- 2008-11-02 Who Wants to Live Forever
- 2008-11-09 Human Nature
- 2008-11-16 Make Your Own Fortune
- 2008-11-30 Into America
- 2008-12-07 Rainy Day Blues
- 2008-12-14 Meet the new Boss
- 2008-12-28 The Holiday Special
- 2009-01-11 The Dinner Party
- 2009-01-18 How To Say Goodbye
- 2009-01-25 Half Baked
- 2009-02-08 Of Time, Space and Money
- 2009-02-15 Lew Wasserman
- 2009-02-22 How To Build a Bomb Shelter
- 2009-03-08 Never Say I Love You
- 2009-03-15 100 False Messiahs
- 2009-03-22 Fishin' for Glory
- 2009-04-05 The Armchair Guide to Survival
- 2009-04-19 How to Be a Grownup
- 2009-04-26 Adam and Eve
- 2009-05-03 Why We Mistakes
- 2009-05-17 The Deciders
- 2009-05-24 Splendours of the Small Screen
- 2009-05-31 Buzz Pick Up The Phone: The Best of Season 5

== Season 6 ==
- 2009-09-12 A Better You
- 2009-09-19 All Beasts Go to Heaven
- 2009-09-26 We Are But The Stuff Of Dreams
- 2009-10-10 The High Cost of Living
- 2009-10-17 Patent Pending
- 2009-10-24 High Art, Low Art
- 2009-11-07 No Man is an Island
- 2009-11-14 26 Minutes, 30 Seconds
- 2009-11-21 The Answering Machine
- 2009-12-05 Adhesion
- 2009-12-12 Jacob And Esau
- 2009-12-19 Mysteries
- 2010-01-16 Getting Away from it All
- 2010-01-23 Radical Honesty
- 2010-01-30 Multi Media
- 2010-02-13 A Matter of Taste
- 2010-02-27 Cain and Abel
- 2010-03-06 My Impostor
- 2010-03-13 Visiting Hours
- 2010-03-27 Bernice Meadows
- 2010-04-03 The Reverse Life
- 2010-04-10 Jonah and the Great Fish
- 2010-04-24 The World on a String
- 2010-05-01 The Price of Fame
- 2010-05-08 The Little One
- 2010-05-22 The Ride of Your Life
- 2010-05-29 There's No Ship Like Friendship: The Best of Season 6

== Season 7 ==
- 2010-09-11 Chasing Rainbows
- 2010-09-18 Don't Make a Scene
- 2010-09-25 Negatron
- 2010-10-09 Live in the Now... NOW!
- 2010-10-16 Pick a Path
- 2010-10-30 Halloween 2010: To Sleep Perchance to Die
- 2010-11-06 The Mighty Boosh
- 2010-11-13 Making Ends Meet
- 2010-11-20 Modern Day Saviours
- 2010-12-04 Circle of Friends
- 2010-12-11 Life Out of Balance
- 2011-01-08 The Advice Show
- 2011-01-15 Special Features
- 2011-01-22 The Predicament
- 2011-01-29 The Grudge
- 2011-02-12 Couples
- 2011-02-19 It's Time
- 2011-02-26 We Be Illin'
- 2011-03-12 The Elite
- 2011-03-26 When Life Gives You Lemons
- 2011-04-08 A Change of Plan
- 2011-04-14 The Honeymooners
- 2011-04-22 The Pitch
- 2011-05-05 'Til Death Do Us Part
- 2011-05-13 By the Book
- 2011-05-20 The Big Thrill
- 2011-05-26 Party Like It's Monday: The Best of Season 7

== Season 8 ==
- 2011-09-09 By the Seashore
- 2011-09-16 The God Whistle
- 2011-09-23 All Lies Great and Small
- 2011-10-07 The World Upside Down
- 2011-10-13 Spoiler Alert
- 2011-10-21 Look At Me, Don't Look At Me
- 2011-11-04 Private Eye
- 2011-11-11 Girls Gone Wild
- 2011-11-18 The Final Frontier
- 2011-12-02 Tales of Excess
- 2011-12-09 Gluttony
- 2011-12-16 Real Life Superheroes
- 2012-01-13 All the World's a Stage
- 2012-01-20 Man vs. Machine
- 2012-01-27 Wrath
- 2012-02-10 Lust
- 2012-02-17 Envy
- 2012-02-24 World Wide What
- 2012-03-02 Party Men
- 2012-03-09 Pride
- 2012-03-16 Sloth
- 2012-03-23 Welcome to the Family
- 2012-04-06 Best Perfect Day Ever
- 2012-04-13 Learn Some Manners
- 2012-04-20 Greed
- 2012-05-04 Hell is Other People
- 2012-05-11 A Whole Stack of Memories Never Equals One Little Hope
- 2012-05-18 Games of Chance
- 2012-05-25 Pessimistic Panthers: The Best of Season 8

== Season 9 ==
- 2012-09-06 The Age of Love
- 2012-09-13 Nothing to Fear
- 2012-09-20 Animal Instinct
- 2012-10-04 The Nagging Task
- 2012-10-11 Letting Go
- 2012-10-25 Halloween 2012: Murder on the Wiretap Express
- 2012-11-08 Wake Up, Call Me, Tell Me Your Dream
- 2012-11-15 Why Travel: A Journey to Bali
- 2012-11-22 Know Your Strengths
- 2012-12-06 Look Ma, I'm Trending
- 2012-12-12 Co-ed
- 2012-12-20 A WireTap Christmas Carol
- 2013-01-17 Breaking the Rules
- 2013-01-24 Family Gathering
- 2013-02-08 Modern Love
- 2013-02-15 Nostalgia
- 2013-02-22 The Mistake
- 2013-03-01 Alana
- 2013-03-15 250th
- 2013-03-22 The Game
- 2013-03-29 The Future is Unwritten
- 2013-04-13 Legacy
- 2013-04-19 Appearances
- 2013-04-26 Discomfort
- 2013-05-10 It's All Been Done
- 2013-05-17 Tough Guys
- 2013-05-24 Sommelierize This: The Best of Season 9

== Season 10 ==
- 2013-09-06 How to Age Gracefully
- 2013-09-13 Temporary Insanity
- 2013-09-20 Being Invisible
- 2013-10-03 The Sweetness of Youth
- 2013-10-10 Safe House
- 2013-10-18 The Other Life
- 2013-11-01 Small Change
- 2013-11-08 Apples vs. Oranges
- 2013-11-16 Trapped!
- 2013-11-29 Smoke and Mirrors
- 2013-12-06 This is What You Get
- 2013-12-20 Secret Santa
- 2014-01-10 The Liar
- 2014-01-17 The Very Last Minute
- 2014-01-24 Sanctuary
- 2014-02-07 A Hanky Full of Heart-Shaped Tears
- 2014-02-14 The Gold Rush
- 2014-02-21 A World Without Borders
- 2014-03-07 Other People's Problems
- 2014-03-14 Forgotten History
- 2014-03-21 What We Lose
- 2014-04-04 Spring Fever
- 2014-04-11 Re:birth
- 2014-04-18 A Face from the Past
- 2014-05-02 Milestones
- 2014-05-09 Life Vs. Art
- 2014-05-16 The Dilemna Dilemma
- 2014-05-23 I Can't Hear You, Eileen: The Best of Season 10

== Season 11 ==
- 2014-09-05 The Power of Suggestion
- 2014-09-12 Old Wounds
- 2014-09-19 Double Power
- 2014-10-03 Final Words
- 2014-10-09 Against the Grain
- 2014-10-24 Halloween 2014: Axing for Trouble
- 2014-10-31 Shush
- 2014-11-07 This Magic Moment
- 2014-11-14 Sorry
- 2014-11-28 The Hail Mary Pass
- 2014-12-05 The Time Machine
- 2014-12-12 Five Goldstein Rings
- 2015-01-09 Dreamers
- 2015-01-16 The Ideal Self
- 2015-01-23 Just Dance
- 2015-02-06 What's The Use?
- 2015-02-13 The Dating Game
- 2015-02-20 All in Your Head
- 2015-03-06 Watch Your Language
- 2015-03-13 Yes or No
- 2015-03-20 Why is Mason Reese Crying?
- 2015-04-03 My Old Address Book
- 2015-04-10 Character Study
- 2015-04-24 There's A Light That Never Goes Out
- 2015-05-01 Bad Thoughts
- 2015-05-08 What We Really Mean
- 2015-05-22 How to Deal With Loss
- 2015-05-29 The Back Half Of The Moose: The Best Of Season 11
