= Philip Street =

Canadian cartoonist and animator (born 1959)

- Born: 1959 (age 66–67)
- Area: Cartoonist
- Notable works: Fisher

Philip Street (born 1959) is a Canadian cartoonist and animator who lives in Toronto. He lived in Blyth, Ontario during his childhood and studied English at St. Michael's College in Toronto, as well as classical animation at Sheridan College. He lived in Kingston, Ontario, before moving to Toronto.

From 1990 to 1997 he was art director of Compass, and subsequently became the founding art director of Voices Across Boundaries.

He drew the satirical slice-of-life comic strip Fisher, which appeared daily in The Globe and Mail until 8 September 2012. An earlier strip, Rip Trousers, ran in the Kingston Whig-Standard in 1993 and 1994.

Since 1998 he has also been a graphic designer at the Canadian Broadcasting Corporation, where he has worked on Sesame Park, CBC Kids and The Nature of Things. He has also directed 76 episodes of Peter Puck for Hockey Night in Canada.
