= Luis Pardo Céspedes =

- Born: June 20, 1968 (age 58); Barcelona, Spain
- Occupations: Business manager, writer
- Writing career
- Language: Spanish
- Website: www.luispardocespedes.com

Luis Pardo Céspedes (Born 20 June 1968) is a Spanish business manager and writer, he is considered a specialist in leadership and new technologies as well as its application to small and medium enterprises. Since 2014, he has been CEO and executive vice president of Sage Iberia.

In 2018, he received the Gold Medal for Merit at Work from the European Association of Economics and Competitiveness. He was recognized with the "CEO of the Year" award by the newspaper La Razón in 2017.

== Early life and education ==
Luis Pardo was born into a family of small and medium-sized business owners, an environment that has been cited as influential in shaping his professional interests. He has stated that this background provided early exposure to the challenges faced by small and medium-sized enterprises (SMEs). His academic training and professional experience have focused on the application of new technologies and digital transformation in small businesses. Pardo has also spoken publicly about the role of diversity in innovation and has worked with multidisciplinary, multigenerational, and multicultural teams.

He graduated summa cum laudem in business administration and management from the European University. Continuing his training with the Master in General Management from the IESE - Business School (University of Navarra), Master in Business Administration from EADA Business School (Barcelona) and a master's degree in business sciences, from the Management School (Barcelona).

== Career ==
He began his career in 1989, a year after finishing his degree, as a marketing manager in Copeca, a family business in the food sector that had begun its internationalization. Three years later, he moved to Gesfime where he worked in finance and sales.

After Gesfime, he moved into new technologies as the director of operations of a service company in the IT sector (Replitec). After this, he joined as director the third world manufacturer at that time, MPO, of digital media, CDs and DVDs, and worked with the leading companies in the world of software and multimedia. At the same time, MPO developed a new business with a logistics services company for the IT sector.

In 2001, he began his professional relationship with SAGE, the multinational world leader in business management software. After several positions of responsibility, he assumed the responsibility of the General Directorate of Clients in Europe and in 2014 he was appointed CEO in Spain, executive vice president of Sage Iberia and member of the European Committee in 2014.

=== Expert in medium and small companies ===
As an expert in technological development in medium and small companies, he says that "the first lever of the growth of a company in the XXI century is innovation and in this case, technological innovation". In addition, he emphasizes the importance of continuing training and has applied this to his own professional career. Due to all this, it has become a benchmark in the world of SMEs and self-employed and has led him to collaborate as a guest firm in magazines and newspapers, such as [ El País Economía].

Through his work at Sage Iberia, he has been involved in initiatives supporting small and medium-sized enterprises (SMEs) and self-employed professionals. He has held several positions in Spanish business organizations, including membership in the Business Action Council of the Spanish Confederation of Business Organizations (CEOE), the Advisory Council of Foment del Treball, and its Innovation and Technology Network.

He is also a member of the Malaga Valley Club and serves as president of the Madrid International Business Club. Since 2019, he has been a member of the board of trustees of the EADA University Foundation.

In 2020, he joined the Management Committee and Board of Directors of AMETIC, a Spanish association representing companies in the technology and digital industries.[3] In May of the same year, he became president of the British Chamber of Commerce in Spain, having previously served on its Governing Council.

In addition to his organizational responsibilities, he advises emerging businesses and entrepreneurs within Spain's business sector.

=== Expert in digital humanism ===
Luis Pardo has been one of the first voices to speak of digital humanism in Spain and expresses his vision about the effects of the Fourth Industrial Revolution in his book 'Journey to the center of digital humanism', convinced that with will and Ethics is our best ally to get better.

The technological revolution is rethinking the anthropological questions of classical masters and posing dilemmas and ethical challenges. Luis Céspedes defends that digital humanism is the answer to how we should use technology, and also to human values and to keep in mind that technology must always be at the service of the human being.

== Bibliography ==
- El ABC del autónomo. Guía práctica para planificar, financiar y gestionar tu propio negocio, Ed. Deusto (2016). ISBN 9788423424870
- Siete claves para el éxito de las Start-Ups (edición digital)
- Viaje al centro del humanismo digital, Ed. Verssus (2019). ISBN 9788494944369

=== Chapters of books ===
- VV.AA: La empresa en España: Objetivo 2020, Ed. Deusto (2017).
- VV.AA: Internacionalización: claves y buenas prácticas, Profit (2015)
- VV.AA: Nuevas tendencias en gestión pública, Profit (2011)

== Recognition ==
Awards	Given by	Year
Innovation Award	SAGE	2007
Confident Leader Award	SAGE	2014
Leadership Award	EU Business School	2016
Best World #1	SAGE	2017
Estrella de Oro de la Excelencia Profesional	Instituto Excelencia Profesional	2017
CEO del Año	Premios Tecnología e Innovación, de La Razón	2017
Medalla de Oro al Mérito en el Trabajo	Asociación Europea de Economía y Competitividad.	2018
Member of the Year de los Movers & Shakers Business Awards	Barcelona International Business Club	2020
CEO del año Gran Empresa 2020	Club CEO	2020
