= The Jam (comics) =

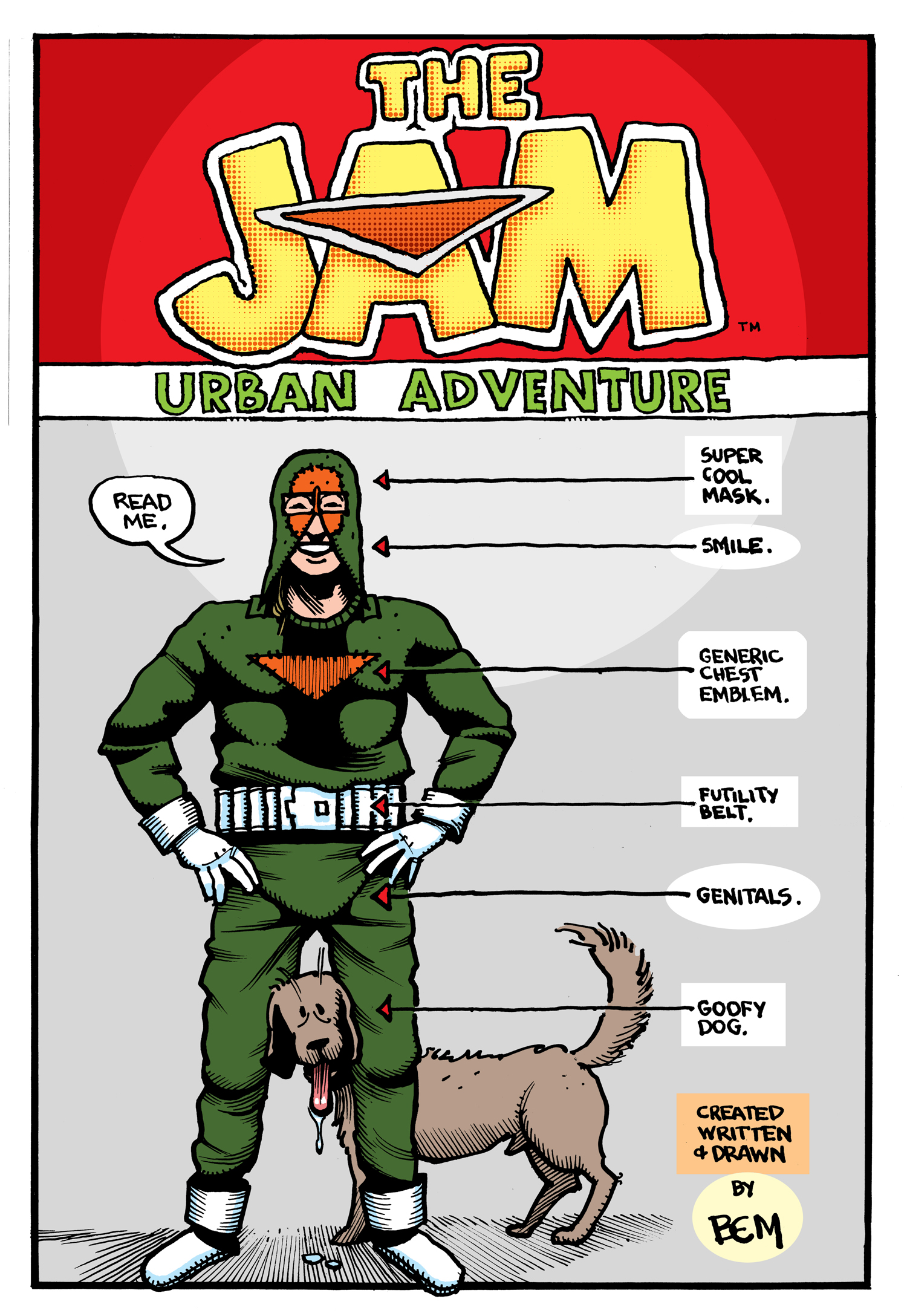
- A drawing of the comic book character created by Canadian cartoonist Bernard Mireault.

Publication information
- Publisher: Matrix Graphics Series; Artworx; Comico; Slave Labor Graphics; Fantagraphics Books; Tundra Publishing; Dark Horse Comics; Caliber Comics; Gemstone Publishing; Evil Twin Comics; Blind Bat Press; TwoMorrows Publishing; CO_{2} Comics; BEM Graphics; Image Comics; Mem9ire; EDGE Science Fiction and Fantasy Publishing; About Comics
- First appearance: New Triumph Featuring Northguard #2 (1985)
- Created by: Bernie Mireault

In-story information
- Alter ego: Gordon "Gordie" Kirby
- Species: Human
- Place of origin: Montréal, Quebec, Canada
- Partnerships: Janet Ditko; Harvey; Nancy; Jane Marble; Dave Brave; Douglas Camp; The Backup Mob; Madman; René Marble
- Notable aliases: The Jammer Omniscient: Ruler of Hell for Assholes; Tarzan; Little Fish
- Abilities: Solid moral compass; Intolerance for assholes; Willingness to take action when others are not; Good communicator; Cool under pressure; Capable hand-to-hand combatant; Resistance to hypnotic induction; Writes music and plays guitar

The Jam, formally known as the Jammer, is a fictional costumed hero, created by the late writer-artist Bernie Mireault, who originally appeared in Canadian comic books published by Matrix Graphics Series. The Jammer made his first appearance in New Triumph Featuring Northguard #2 (1985).

The Jammer is the alter ego of Gordon "Gordie" Kirby, an otherwise normal guy who found he enjoyed patrolling the rooftops of his home city of Montréal in a homemade superhero costume. The Jammer is not really a superhero. He often finds himself in the right place at the right time, and is compelled to act heroically. Sometimes he is hired to do good deeds. His personal mission is to "dominate the world with peace, love, and free beer". Through the course of his career, he has battled terrorists, a delusional psychiatrist, and even servants of the Devil.

== Publication history ==
The first published stories of the Jam appeared in New Triumph Featuring Northguard from Matrix Graphic Series between 1985 and Summer of 1986. These stories were collected, along with a new unpublished story, by Matrix Graphics Series as The Jam Special #1 in 1987. A second special, The Jam, Urban Adventure: Super Cool, Color-injected, Turbo Adventure from Hell #1, was published in 1988 by Comico, and advertised a series "bi-monthly starting this summer from Matrix".

Slave Labor Graphics published The Jam, Urban Adventure #1–5 between November 1989 and the Summer of 1991. The Jam, Urban Adventure #1 (November 1989) was an expanded version of the new story found in The Jam Special #1 (1987). Tundra Publishing colorized and republished The Jam, Urban Adventure #1–5 between January and May 1992. Dark Horse Comics picked up the title and published issues' #6-8 between October 1993 and February 1995. Finally, Caliber Comics published issues #9–14 between 1995 and 1997, as well as the Jam short story "The Chair" in Negative Burn #25 (1995). From then on several mini-series', one-shots and short stories were published (see list below).

Bernie Mireault was featured in Demi-Dieux, 40 ans de super-héros dans la bande dessinée québécoise ("Demi-Gods: 40 Years of Superheroes in Québec Comics") published by Jean-Dominique Leduc at Mem9ire (2014). The Jammer appeared, along with other notable characters, on the cover of the book.

Date	Publication	Publisher
1985	New Triumph Featuring Northguard #2	Matrix Graphic Series
1985	New Triumph Featuring Northguard #3	Matrix Graphic Series
1986	New Triumph Featuring Northguard #4	Matrix Graphic Series
1986	New Triumph Featuring Northguard #5	Matrix Graphic Series
1986	Canadian Comics Cavalcade	Artworx
1987	The Jam Special #1	Matrix Graphic Series
1988.05	The Jam, Urban Adventure: Super Cool, Color-injected, Turbo Adventure from Hell #1	Comico
1989.11	The Jam, Urban Adventure #1	Slave Labor Graphics
1990.01	The Jam, Urban Adventure #2	Slave Labor Graphics
1990.03	The Jam, Urban Adventure #3	Slave Labor Graphics
1990.05	The Jam, Urban Adventure #4	Slave Labor Graphics
1991.01	Amazing Heroes Swimsuit Special #2	Fantagraphics Books
1991	The Jam, Urban Adventure #5	Slave Labor Graphics
1992.01	The Jam, Urban Adventure #1	Tundra Publishing
1992.02	The Jam, Urban Adventure #2	Tundra Publishing
1992.03	The Jam, Urban Adventure #3	Tundra Publishing
1992.04	The Jam, Urban Adventure #4	Tundra Publishing
1992.05	The Jam, Urban Adventure #5	Tundra Publishing
1993.10	The Jam, Urban Adventure #6	Dark Horse Comics
1994.03	The Jam, Urban Adventure #7	Dark Horse Comics
1995.02	The Jam, Urban Adventure #8	Dark Horse Comics
1995.07	Negative Burn #25	Caliber Comics
1995	The Jam, Urban Adventure #9	Caliber Comics
1995	The Jam, Urban Adventure #10	Caliber Comics
1995	The Jam, Urban Adventure #11	Caliber Comics
1995	Caliber Comics 1996 Calendar	Caliber Comics
1995.12	Overstreet's Fan #7 (Indy Jam Variant)	Gemstone Publishing
1996	The Jam, Urban Adventure #12	Caliber Comics
1996	The Jam, Urban Adventure #13	Caliber Comics
1997	The Jam, Urban Adventure #14	Caliber Comics
1998.07	Madman/Jam #1	Dark Horse Comics
1998.08	Madman/Jam #2	Dark Horse Comics
1999	Madman Boogaloo! Starring Nexus & The Jam	Dark Horse Comics
2007.10	Awesome: The Indie Spinner Rack Anthology	Evil Twin Comics
2007	The Comic Eye: Comics About Comics	Blind Bat Press
2008.04	Modern Masters, Volume Sixteen: Mike Allred	TwoMorrows Publishing
2009.10	"The Jam Lives"	CO_{2} Comics Comics
2011	To Get Her	BEM Graphics
2012.10	Madman 20th Anniversary Monster!	Image Comics
2013.03.15	"The Jam 00a"	Comic Art of Bernie Mireault
2013.03.21	"The Chair"	Comic Art of Bernie Mireault
2013.03.25	"Team Jam"	Comic Art of Bernie Mireault
2014.04	Demi-Dieux, 40 ans de super-héros dans la bande dessinée québécoise	Mem9ire
2016.03	Tesseracts Nineteen: Superhero Universe	EDGE Science Fiction and Fantasy Publishing
2017.03	XVI Short Stories	About Comics

== Fictional character biography ==
=== Major story arcs ===
==== Fun with Flarks ====
While vacationing in Montréal with friends, the Blood King hired Jane Marble to protect him from a small but determined army of terrorists who followed in his wake. Jane contracted the Gordon Kirby to be the king's body double.

Spans The Jam, Urban Adventure #1–5 (1989–91).

==== Broken Hearts ====
The Devil took a special interest in Gordon Kirby when he learned Gordie's happiness ratings were "off the chart".

Spans The Jam, Urban Adventure #1–5 (1989–91), #9–10 (1995).

==== "...Said the Madman." ====
Jane Marble referred Gordon Kirby to Dr. Andrew Mandigo who was willing to pay the Jammer to talk about his life as a crimefighter.

Spans The Jam, Urban Adventure #6–8 (1993–5).

==== To Get Her ====
Gordon Kirby and Janet Ditko had been together for 10 years. Gordie had rediscovered his calling as a comic artist. Janet was frustrated and looking for a change.

To Get Her (2011).

=== Multi-issue stories ===
==== Ask Him About the Kinetic ====
Gordon Kirby was sent to Philadelphia, Pennsylvania to personally deliver a message to Jane Marble's client Mark Trimble. She offered to tear up Mark's bill if he told Gordie about the Kinetic.

Spans The Jam, Urban Adventure #13–14 (1996–7).

==== House of Escher ====
Gordon Kirby met Frank Einstein who had traveled to Montréal to uncover the mystery behind a reoccurring dream.

Spans Madman/Jam #1–2 (1998).

=== Short stories ===
==== What Are You Doing to My Mother? ====
The Jammer happened upon Jane Marble being mugged in an alleyway at knifepoint.

Found in New Triumph #2 (1985).

==== Fight! Fight! Fight! ====
The Jammer spotted a mother and her child being threatened on an adjacent rooftop by an angry man with a gun.

Found in New Triumph #3 (1985).

==== I'm Gonna Screw Up Your Float. ====
Gordon Kirby tried to return bottles to a convenience store when it was robbed at gunpoint.

Found in New Triumph #4 (1986).

==== Time to Get Rich ====
Gordon Kirby called Jane Marble about a job opportunity and overheard an intruder breaking into her office.

Found in New Triumph #5 (1986).

==== You're Such a Pig, Roger. ====
The Jammer happened upon an enraged man dangling another from the roof of a building by a rope.

Found in The Jam Special #1 (1987).

==== The Price Is High. ====
Gordon Kirby dreamed he was the Jammer Omniscient, ruler of Hell for Assholes.

Found in The Jam, Urban Adventure: Super Cool, Color-injected, Turbo Adventure from Hell #1 (1988).

==== Don't Forget the Rent. ====
Gordon Kirby visited his bank and noticed two suspicious men walking in and another waiting outside behind the wheel of a car.

Found in The Jam, Urban Adventure: Super Cool, Color-injected, Turbo Adventure from Hell #1 (1988).

==== New Talent Night ====
Gordon Kirby and Janet Ditko attended the debut of the Balloons at the Blue Angel Bar's New Talent Night.

Found in The Jam, Urban Adventure #2 (1990).

==== The Mighty Jan ====
Janet Ditko dreamed she was a superhero attempting to rescue Gordon Kirby (in his Jammer costume) from the clutches of the evil Hell Lord.

Found in The Jam, Urban Adventure #4 (1990).

==== God's Window ====
Tony Matootsi was killed in a freak accident. His wife Nina held a religious vigil.

Found in The Jam, Urban Adventure #6 (1993).

==== The Chair ====
Gordon Kirby and Janet Ditko scrambled to acquire nice a chair that had been abandoned in an alley across from their apartment building.

Found in Negative Burn #25 (1995).

==== Story Time at the Blue Angel ====
Gordon Kirby met his friend Rex at the Blue Angel Bar to talk about an event that had been bothering him.

Breakfast

Rex related a disturbing encounter he had with an enraged motorist.

Asphalt

Bob, a businessman from Texas, told a ghost story about a haunted stretch of highway.

Insects!

A bar patron recounts his unnerving experiences with the intrusive insect life of Winnipeg, Manitoba.
Found in The Jam, Urban Adventure #11 (1995).

==== Megan's Story ====
Gordon Kirby and Janet Ditko were invited to Studio C by Janet's Aunt Zoe for the opening of Klee Shonin's new show.

Found in The Jam, Urban Adventure #12 (1996).

==== Team Jam ====
Snuuger Dü, Bug-Eyed Monster, Dr. Robot, and No.1 met the Jammer when they got lost following a storyline.

Found in Awesome: The Indie Spinner Rack Anthology (2007).

==== Comic Jam ====
Gordon Kirby attended a regular drawing workshop and social hour for cartoonists at La Sala Rosa Restaurant. The attending artists produced a collaborative comic.

Found in To Get Her (2011).

==== A Secret Bowman ====
Gordon Kirby witnessed a man being shot with an arrow by a bowman from an adjoining rooftop.

Found as prose in Tesseract Nineteen: Superhero Universe (2016) and adapted as comics in The Jam, Urban Adventure: Super Cool, Color-injected, Turbo Adventure from Hell #2 (2022).

=== The works of Gordon Kirby ===
==== Mayhem in Alphabet Town ====
"Mayhem in Alphabet Town" was a bedtime story created by Gordon Kirby for his nephew Ronnie. It is a murder mystery wherein the residents of Alphabet Town come together to determine who killed Q.

Found in The Jam, Urban Adventure #9 (1995).

==== Internal Dialogue ====
"Internal Dialogue" is a 16-page comic written and illustrated by Gordon Kirby about a man who is held ransom by his mistreated organs.

Found in To Get Her (2011).

==== Hi-hat ====
"Hi-hat" is a series of newspaper-style comicstrips written and illustrated by Gordon Kirby that serve as an allegory to his struggles as an artist.

Found in To Get Her (2011).

==== Asshole ====
"Asshole" is a 10-panel newspaper-style comicstrip about a clown asking for a handout from a disillusioned good samaritan.

Found in To Get Her (2011).

== Powers and abilities ==
The Jammer is athletic and in good physical shape, regularly leaping between rooftops when patrolling his neighborhood. The Jammer is a capable hand-to-hand combatant, having knocked armed assailants unconscious, subdued a religious fanatic who was assaulting a woman in the street, easily defended himself against two opponents in the back of a police wagon, and performed an impeccable tomoe nage on a man who attacked him with a cane. The Jammer has also displayed a resistance to hypnotic induction.

== Equipment ==
=== Costume ===
The Jammer's costume consists of a loose-fitting dark-green hooded jogging suit (from Sears); a white belt; and dirty white cavalier-style gloves and boots. Bits of orange material were added to the hood to form a mask with large square eyeholes; and an inverted orange triangle was sewn onto the chest. The clumsy hand stitching shows plainly. Gordie's sister Nancy made the costume for him as a joke in reference to his early superhero comic habit and his devotion to the original Batman television series.

=== Futility Belt ===
The Jammer's "futility belt" is a jury-rigged tool belt that features four small tubes on either side of a rectangular interlocking buckle. From this belt, he has produced a smoke pellet, a business card, a dog whistle, a notepad & pen, and a plastic pet-waste bag.

== Reception ==
Larry Snelly reviewed The Jam in White Wolf Inphobia #53 (March, 1995) and stated that "After reading this funnybook, you can't help but have a wonderful, warm feeling. It's always funny, down to earth and refreshingly upbeat."

== Source material ==
- The Grand Comics Database
