= Jimmy Beaulieu =

Canadian cartoonist

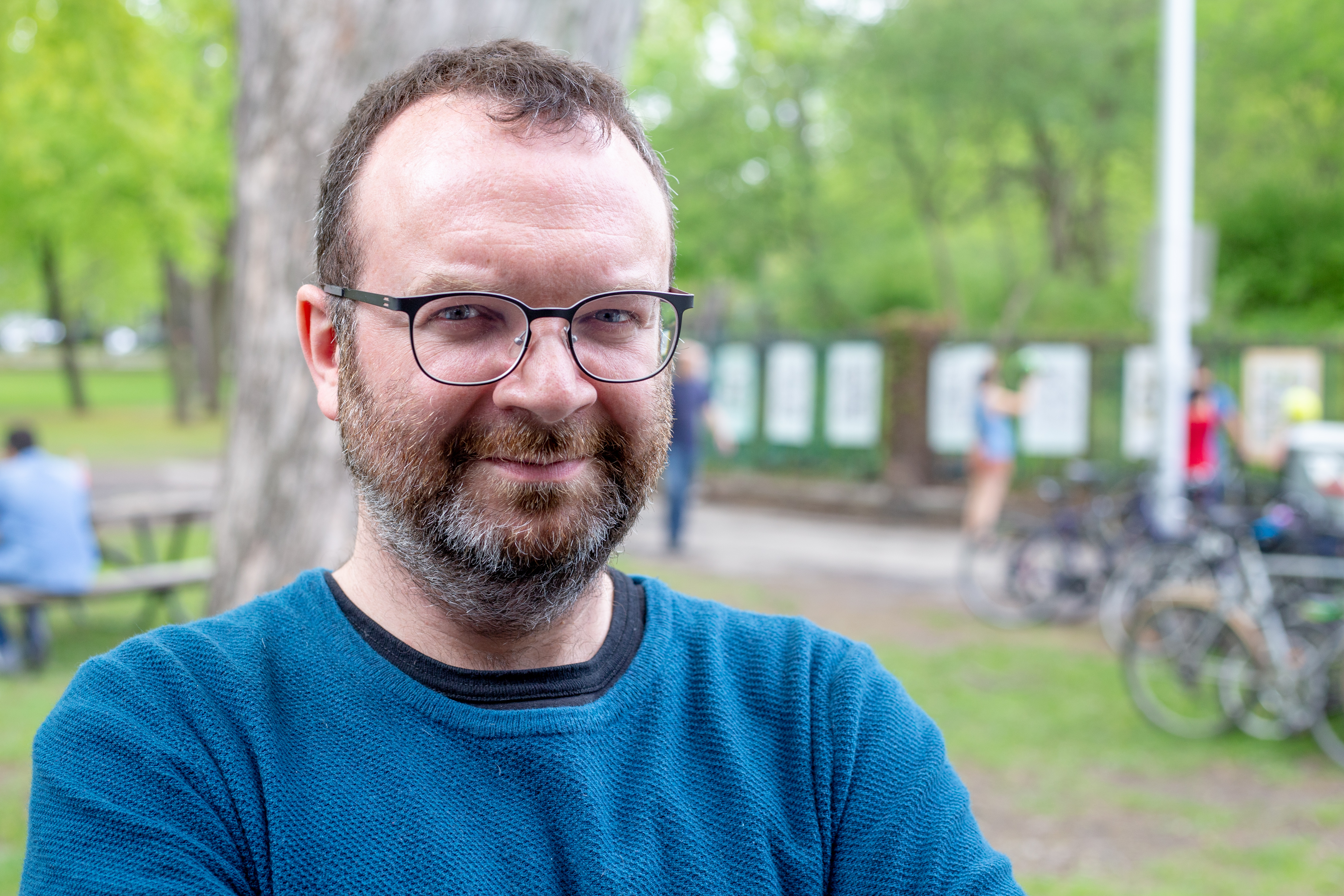
- Beaulieu in 2019
- Born: 1974; Canada
- Occupation: Cartoonist

Jimmy Beaulieu (born 1974) is a Canadian cartoonist. He has worked as an editor for the Mecanique Generale label (of publisher 400 Coups), lecturer, dialogist, organizer and critic. Co-founder of the 'Mécanique Générale' collective of artists, with a mandate to help establish a place for Sequential Art in the cultural landscape. He moved to Montreal in 1998, when he started drawing comics.
