= Howard Chackowicz =

Canadian artist and musician

- Born: 1969 (age 56–57); Laval, Quebec
- Occupation: Artist
- Spouse: Isa Tousignant

Howard Chackowicz (born 1969 in Laval, Quebec) is a Montreal-based Canadian artist and musician well known for his contributions to the independent comic book scene. In addition to exhibiting his work internationally, Chackowicz has taught illustration at the Saidye Bronfman Centre for the Arts and presently runs a Comix and Cartooning workshop for Drawn & Quarterly. In 2000, Chackowicz was named one of the top 5 local cartoonists of the year by The Montreal Mirror.

== Published works ==
- 1994: Howie Comic
- 1996: Mini Capatalist Funnies / Chack'z
- 1996: Mini Howie / Chack'z
- 2008: Howie Action Comix (Conundrum Press)
- 2019: Nothing To See Here (Conundrum Press)

== Other work ==
Chackowicz plays drums for two long-lived Montreal-based bands: The American Devices (1980) and Nutsak (1996). Chackowicz contributed to Against the Day, the 2009 debut release from the Sam Shalabi project Land of Kush.

In 2001 Chackowicz had roles in the François Miron experimental film Resolving Power, and in the short Sweat Angel by Montreal filmmaker Jon Tucker.

Chackowicz was a regular on CBC Radio One's comedy program WireTap throughout the length of its run from 2004 to 2015. His character was a child in a man's body, who often needed the help of host Jonathan Goldstein with various plans and schemes that never ended well for Jonathan. He had appeared in several internet video shorts produced by the radio show.

Chackowicz has also written restaurant reviews for the Hour and for enRoute magazine.
