= Captain Canuck =

Canadian comic book superhero

- Two Canucks by Claude St. Aubin (2014)

Publication information
- Publisher: I: Comely Comix/CKR; II: Semple Comics; III: Comedy Comics/Hot Hail Comics; IV: Chapterhouse Comics
- First appearance: I: Captain Canuck #1 (Comely Comix, July 1975); II: Captain Canuck: Reborn #0; III: Captain Canuck: Unholy War #1 (2004); IV: Captain Canuck 2014 Summer Special
- Created by: I: Richard Comely; Ron Leishman; II: Richard Comely; III: Riel Langlois; Drue Langlois; IV: Richard Comely; Kalman Andrasofszky

In-story information
- Alter ego: I & IV: Tom Evans; II: Darren Oak; III: David Semple
- Team affiliations: I: CISO; IV: Equilibrium
- Abilities: I: Super-strength, super-speed IV: Super strength, super speed, enhanced durability, super suit with a variety of technical abilities

Captain Canuck is a Canadian comic book superhero. Created by cartoonist Ron Leishman and artist/writer Richard Comely, the original Captain Canuck first appeared in Captain Canuck #1 (July 1975). The series was the first successful Canadian comic book since the collapse of the nation's comic book industry following World War II.

Three characters have worn the maple leaf costume of Captain Canuck. The first Captain Canuck patrolled Canada in the then-future year of 1993, where "Canada had become the most powerful country in the world". He was the costumed agent of the "Canadian International Security Organization" (CISO). In 1995, Captain Canuck was honored with a Canadian postage stamp, along with Superman, Johnny Canuck, Fleur de Lys, and Nelvana of the Northern Lights.

Like most independent comics, Captain Canuck's adventures have been published sporadically.

== Publication history ==
Cover to Captain Canuck#1 (July 1975), art by Richard Comely.

First published in 1975, Captain Canuck's original adventures were published on and off until 1981. There were several iterations since. Captain Canuck Reborn, Captain Canuck Unholy War (also called West Coast Canuck) and Captain Canuck Legacy.

In 2012, Richard Comely entered into a partnership with Toronto businessman, Fadi Hakim to relaunch a new, updated and modern version of Captain Canuck, which was designed in part by Kalman Andrasofszky (Marvel Comics). An animated series was crowd funded and it aired between 2013 & 2014. A second series of the animated adventures was set to air between 2015 & 2016. The first episode premiered at Hal-Con during Halloween.

=== Tom Evans ===
Canuck's first appearance was in 1975, published by Comely Comix of Winnipeg, Manitoba. The story followed Tom Evans, a Canadian secret agent who gained superhuman strength from contact with extraterrestrials. This first version of the Canadian superhero ran for three issues before going on hiatus in 1976. In 1979, it came back, with Comely being backed by CKR Productions, and publishing 11 more issues, plus a summer special, concluding in early 1981; it was drawn mostly by George Freeman, taking over from Comely, who did the writing and lettering. He was pushed out of CKR after issue #12 was completed and issue #13 and #14 were outlined. The completed issue #15 (written and pencilled by George Freeman and inked, lettered and coloured by Claude St. Aubin) was finally published in 2004 as a limited edition by Comely.

=== Darren Oak ===
Since the original, two newer incarnations of the Canadian icon have appeared: Comely launched a second version in 1993, under the imprint Semple Comics. Set in the present, Captain Canuck: Reborn featured a new Captain Canuck, Darren Oak, who fought a global conspiracy. This title lasted only four issues (#0–3) and was written and drawn by Richard Comely, Leonard Kirk and Sandy Carruthers with inks by Éric Thériault. That incarnation continued as a newspaper comic strip for a short while.

=== David Semple ===
A third incarnation (sometimes called the "West Coast Captain Canuck"), edited by Comely but written and drawn by brothers Riel and Drue Langlois, appeared in 2004 under the banner of Comely Comics, entitled Captain Canuck: Unholy War. Yet another man, RCMP Constable David Semple, adopts the guise of Captain Canuck, to take on a biker gang called the Unholy Avengers. "Unholy War" was slated as a three-issue mini-series, the third and final installment being published in January 2005, but the series came out with a fourth issue (under the 'Hot Hail Comics' banner) in August 2007, which fully concluded the character. A trade paperback of the series was published in 2015 and reissued in 2023.

=== Captain Canuck: Legacy ===
A miniseries, written and illustrated by Comely, Captain Canuck: Legacy, began in the fall of 2006. It contained two continued stories: one detailed the efforts of the second Captain Canuck to prevent illegal weapons from reaching Canada, whilst the second chronicled the continued adventures of the third (West Coast) Captain Canuck. While the series has remained in limbo for some time, the official Captain Canuck website stated that the remainder of the series would be completed in 2009. Captain Canuck Legacy 1.5 was published in August 2011 as a limited edition of 5,000 copies only distributed in Ontario.

=== Captain Canuck collections ===
IDW Publishing published two volumes of collected editions of the 1975-1980 Captain Canuck series. Its first release in June 2009 contained issues #4–10. Volume two, released in December 2009, contained issues #11-14 and the 1980 Summer Special. In November 2011, IDW released Captain Canuck The Complete Edition as a 375-page trade paperback with issues #1–15, the Summer Special, the newspaper strips, sketches and Captain Canuck: Legacy #1.5.

=== 2014–present ===
The success of the web series allowed for a one-shot comic book, the 2014 Captain Canuck Summer Special, which was released on Canada Day, July 1, at comic shops across Canada. This is the first time since 1981 that the Summer Special was released.

In 2015, a Captain Canuck #0 issue was released on Free Comic Book Day, which is the first Saturday of May each year. This issue preceded the new ongoing Captain Canuck series published by Chapterhouse Comics, the first issue of which was available in comic shops worldwide on May 27. In 2025, Captain Canuck became more popular amid the trade war with the United States. That year, a special edition depicted the character facing American president Donald Trump.

== In other media ==
=== Proposed film ===
The Canadian company Mind's Eye Entertainment announced at the 2011 San Diego Comic-Con that it planned to develop a Captain Canuck feature film. No scriptwriter or director were attached. The following year, Mind's Eye revealed that it had selected Vancouver-based screenwriter Arne Olsen to script the feature. Olsen was chosen from a solicitation of pre-selected, accredited Canadian writers, who submitted treatments. The final two choices submitted copies of sample scripts.

=== Web series ===
In 2013 Captain Canuck was reimagined for a five-episode animated web series by Captain Canuck Inc and Smiley Guy Studios. Kris Holden-Reid voices the Captain and Paul Amos his antagonist, Mr. Gold. Several other actors voiced roles in the series including Tatiana Maslany as Redcoat and Laura Vandervoort as Blue Fox. A second series was announced for 2015.

=== Live-action TV series ===
By 2023, a live-action Captain Canuck project was in development. The project is a collaboration between Lev Gleason Studios, VVS Films and Muse Entertainment.

=== Animated series ===
By 2023, an animated series based on the Comic House universe called Camp Canuck was in development. The series is an adaptation of the superhero mentoring the future heroes and villains of the world as a camp counsellor. The project is a collaboration between Lev Gleason Studios, Little Blackstone Studios and Big Studios.

== See also ==
- Johnny Canuck
- Captain Canada (character)
- Guardian, the leader of Marvel Comics' Alpha Flight, a superhero team also from Canada.
- Northguard
