= Albéric Bourgeois =

Canadian cartoonist (1876–1962)

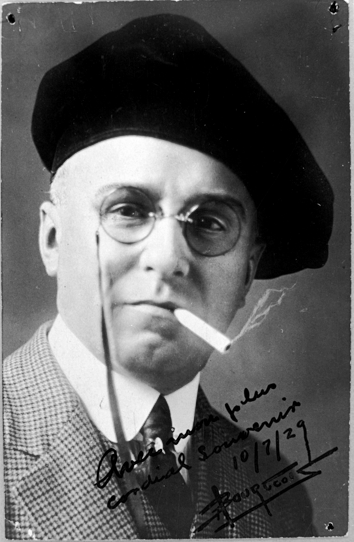
- c. 1929
- Born: November 29, 1876 Montréal, Quebec, Canada
- Died: November 17, 1962 (aged 85)
- Areas: Cartoonist, Artist

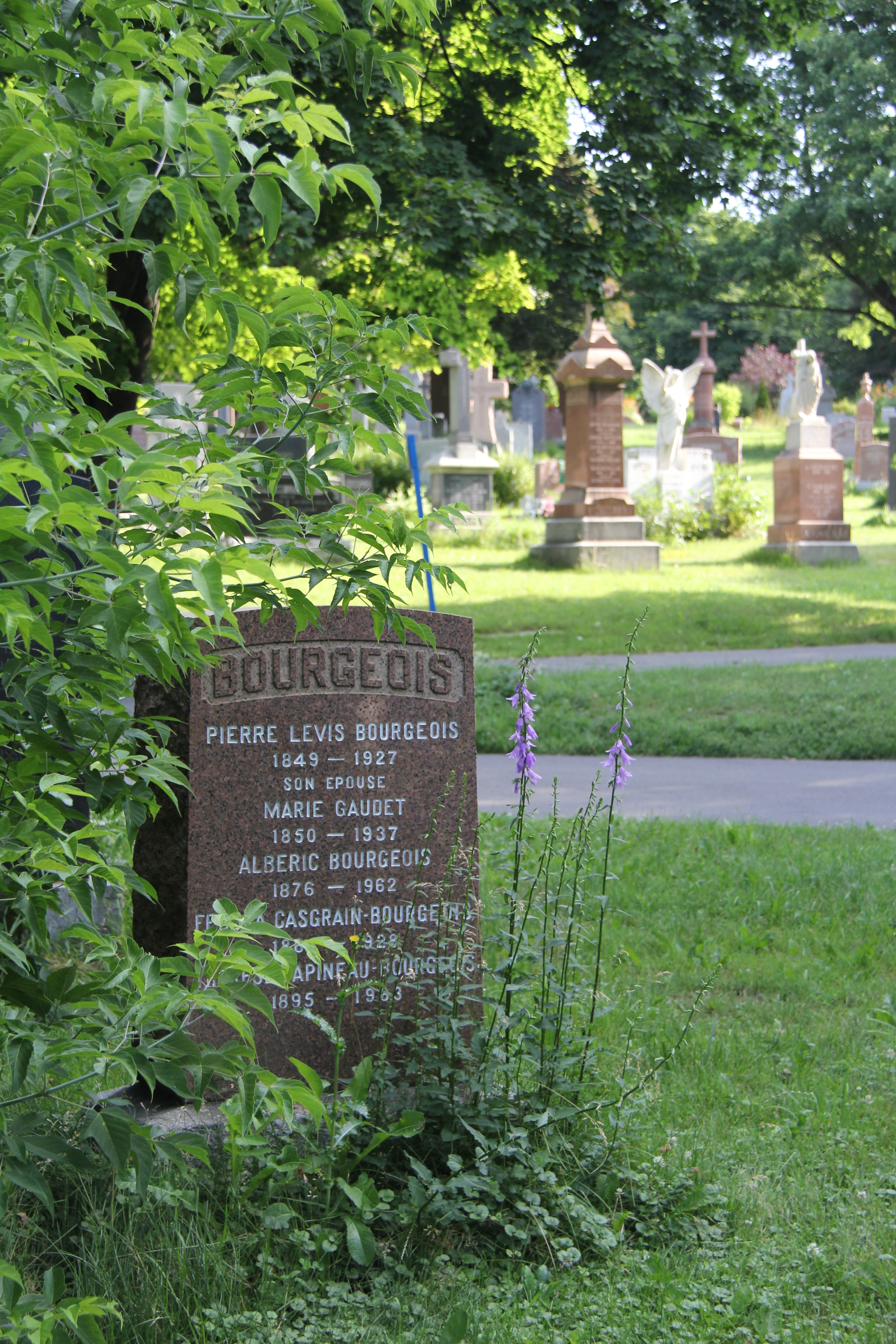
Albéric Bourgeois's tombstone (1876-1962), Notre-Dame-des-Neiges Cemetery (B4467), Montreal.

Albéric Bourgeois (November 29, 1876 – November 17, 1962) was a Canadian cartoonist, credited with creating the first continuing comic strip to use word balloons in Canada.

== Personal history and career ==
Albéric Bourgeois was born November 29, 1876. He studied fine arts in Montréal until 1899, and continued in Boston, where he then landed a job at The Boston Post where he was producing The Education of Annie in 1902. He started at the newspaper La Patrie when he returned to Montréal in 1903. He did political cartoons, as well as the comic strip Les Aventures de Timothée, which may have been the first continuing Québécois comic strip.

Later, he spent 25 years as cartoonist for La Presse, where he created a number of series, including Les Aventures de Toinon from 1905 to 1908, and Les Fables du Parc Lafontaine from 1906 to 1908. In February 1905, he took over Le Père Ladébauche from Joseph Charlebois. This was the most famous comic strip in Québec at the time, and he continued with it until his 1957 retirement, also adapting Ladébauche for the theatre. He also created the humorous radio play, Joson Josette.

Bourgeois died on 11 November 1962 and was entombed at the Notre Dame des Neiges Cemetery in Montreal. He became one of the inaugural cartoonists inducted into the Canadian Cartoonist Hall of Fame in 2005.
