= The Medical Post =

Canadian periodical

- Format: Print
- Owner: EnsembleIQ
- Publisher: EnsembleIQ
- Editor-in-chief: Colin Leslie
- Staff writers: Tom Yun
- Language: English
- Headquarters: Toronto, Canada
- Circulation: 38,110
- ISSN: 0025-7435
- OCLC number: 24623230
- Website: www.canadianhealthcarenetwork.ca

The Medical Post is a semimonthly magazine, published 21 times a year, aimed at Canadian physicians. In 2007, it reported a circulation of 47,000. It was founded in 1965.
