= Fisher (comics) =

- A webcomic that follows the life of Tom Fisher
- Author(s): Philip Street
- Website: http://www.fishercomic.com
- Launch date: 24 June 1992
- End date: Still in production
- Genre(s): Humour

Fisher is a Canadian comic strip, which ran daily exclusively in The Globe and Mail from 1992 to September 2012. On 8 September 2012, the last strip was published in the Globe after the paper decided to drop the comic as part of a reorganization of the page. After its cancellation it restarted as a web only comic. In May 2013 the first book collection of Fisher strips was published by Nestlings Press in Toronto. Titled "When Tom Met Alison", it details the courtship of the two leading characters in the strip.

Fisher is drawn by Philip Street and first appeared in the Globe and Mail on 24 June 1992. The strip's central character is Tom Fisher, an advertising copywriter and follows his life and friends. Other notable main characters are Fisher's wife Alison, a former art student who currently draws her father's comic strip The Snugglebunnies, Ruth, a school teacher, and Eugene, a business consultant.

Tom and Alison married in June 2002, and Ruth and Eugene followed suit in August. It was not long after that Tom and Alison moved into a home of their own, and recently they've had a baby, Paul. After the move the comic strip changed focus from the four in the household and shifted it to Alison, Tom, and their new family.

Ruth and Eugene were also trying to have a baby, but ran into some difficulties. As a result, while they are still friends with Alison and Tom, they do not seem to be as close as they used to be. This is possibly due to feelings of jealousy, but it could just be because they now live in different houses. Ruth and Eugene are an interracial couple; Ruth is black and Eugene is white.

Tom's established career at Waverly & Mogul came to an abrupt end when J.B. Mogul informed Tom of his dismissal. Tom theorizes he was terminated because he had "lost touch" with today's youth.

Recurring characters include Fisher's former ad agency boss J. B. Mogul, Fisher's sister Marion and her husband Biff, Alison and Tom's pets Newcombe (a cat) and Bixby (a sentient robotic personal assistant), a trendy beatnik-type character named Comrade Black and a panhandler/street poet named Homer with whom the characters sometimes interact on the street.

The strip often carries a layer of social commentary. Strips set in Fisher's workplace satirize office politics and corporate bureaucracy; strips set in Fisher's home lean to relationship humour, with a strong focus on Tom's tendency to be introspective. With Paul's arrival the wry satirical observations have an added perspective, since baby Paul seems to have wisdom beyond his age.
