= Peter Whalley =

Canadian caricaturist, cartoonist, illustrator and sculptor

- Born: February 21, 1921 Brockville, Ontario, Canada
- Died: September 18, 2007 (aged 86) Saint-Jérôme, Québec, Canada
- Area: Cartoonist
- Awards: Canadian Cartoonist Hall of Fame

Peter Whalley (February 21, 1921 – September 18, 2007) was a Canadian caricaturist, cartoonist, illustrator and sculptor.

Whalley was born in Brockville, Ontario, went to King's Collegiate School in Windsor, Nova Scotia until 1937, and attended the Nova Scotia College of Art. After serving with the Canadian Merchant Marine during the Second World War, he later established himself in Montreal as a prominent humorist, beginning in the 1940s with the Montreal Standard. He would become well known in the 1960s and 1970s doing covers for Maclean's, Weekend and the Montrealer magazines.

He used a distinctive stripped-down style to send up the cultural and political life of Canada. As an illustrator, he collaborated on works with Eric Nicol and John Robert Colombo, among others.

In 1965, Whalley won first prize for Political Cartooning at the International Salon of Caricature and Cartoon. In 2007, he was inducted into the Canadian Cartoonist Hall of Fame.

He died in a hospital in Saint-Jérôme, Quebec, aged 86.

== Books ==
- Nicol, Eric (2003). Canadian Politics Unplugged. Illustrations by Peter Whalley; introduction by Stuart McLean. Dundurn Press. ISBN 978-1-55002-466-1.
