= Stéphane Delaprée =

French international artist (born 1956)

- Born: Stéphane Delaprée; October 26, 1956 (age 70) Paris, France
- Pseudonym: Stef's Happy Painting

Stéphane Delaprée (born 26 October 1956 in Paris, France) is a well-known international artist resident in Cambodia and is known for his "Happy Painting", naive paintings combining humour, poetic, and realism.

== Biography ==
=== Cartoons ===
Between 1970 and 1980, Stef began his artistic career as cartoon illustrator. He mostly worked in Quebec where he founded the magazine Bambou in Quebec City. He also worked for Belgium's Tintin magazine and for Fripounet magazine based in France.

=== Contemporary Painting ===
In 1992, while living in Costa Rica, willing to change the medium of artwork, Stef moved to painting. His brightly colored canvases depict subjects in nature, with pure rounded motifs. Very quickly, he found a very personal style and created what he terms his own painting movement, the Happy Painting, an artistic concept based on simplicity, very strong colors and “joie de vivre”.

In 1994, Stef moved to Cambodia where he made work for UNICEF, United Nations Development Programme and World Food Programme. The subjects depicted in his paintings evolved to portray daily life in Cambodia. His personal, very positive vision of the country, just out of civil war, met immediate commercial success.

Stef is not attached to and does not receive support from any government, association or artistic group.

In 1997, during the crisis in Cambodia, Stef was amongst the very few foreigners who still believed in the future of the country and stayed there.

The Happy Painting movement influenced a number of Cambodian artists. In a personal letter, Norodom Sihanouk, King of Cambodia, thanked Stef for his precious contribution to Contemporary Art in Cambodia.

In 2008, Stef made a 15-meters mural for the new international airport in Sihanoukville. In 2008, he represented Cambodia at the second Contemporary Art Exhibition in Malaysia. Stef’s creations are currently in galleries in Cambodia, Malaysia, Singapore and India. Later, for Thai Airways International's 50th anniversary, Stephane Delapree was commissioned to create a 3-meter mural for the TAI 'Cambodia headquarter. In 2009, the Ahuja Museum for Arts, Calcutta, India, organized a solo exhibition with Stephane Delapree's Happy Painting. For the 60 anniversary of Pasteur Institute in Cambodia, Stef was commissioned to create a big size canvas, for the Phnom Penh's Pasteur Institute lobby.

In 2013, Stef was commissioned by the Count de Vanssay to create three huge religious artworks canvases to illuminate the chapel of his 14th century Castel, le château de la Barre, Loiret, France. In 2014, Stef was going to close his shop in Phnom Penh due to piracy but later stayed after making a deal with the Foreign Correspondent Club, until April 2016. In 2014, he made his debut in New York City. One of the world's biggest Beaujolais nouveau wine producers, the French Georges Duboeuf, commissioned Stef a personal label design for the 59th anniversary of Georges Duboeuf famous Beaujolais Nouveau wine. In 2016, the artist was commissioned 5 huge religious paintings by Spanish Bishop. Stephane Delapree represented two times Cambodia, 2014 and 2016, in the Art Naif Festiwal Katowice, Poland.

== Main Individual Exhibitions ==
=== Cambodia ===
- Happy Painting Gallery, Phnom Penh, Cambodia, 2000, 2001, 2002, 2003, 2004, 2005, 2006, 2007, 2008, 2009
- Happy Cambodia Art Gallery, Siem Reap, Cambodia, 2000, 2001, 2002, 2003, 2004, 2005, 2006, 2007, 2008, 2009
- Klick Gallery, Phnom Penh, Cambodia, 2002
- New Art Gallery, Phnom Penh, Cambodia, 1995, 1999, 2000, 2001, 2002, 2003
- Inter-Continental Hotel’s Art Gallery, 1997, 1998, 1999
- Hotel Raffles Le Royal’s Art Gallery, Phnom Penh, Cambodia, 1999, 2000, 2001
- Hotel Sofitel, Phnom Penh, Cambodia, 1995, 1996, 1997
- Cambodiana Hotel, Phnom Penh, Cambodia, 1998, 1999, 2000, 2001, 2002, 2003
- Princess Angkor Hotel, Siem Reap, Cambodia, 2003
- Apsara Angkor Hotel, Siem Reap, Cambodia, 2002, 2003
- Angkor Century Hotel, Siem Reap, Cambodia, 2002, 2003, 2004, 2005, 2006, 2007, 2008, 2009.

=== Malaysia ===
- Heng Masterpieces Art Gallery, Kuala Lumpur, Malaysia, 2008, 2009
- International Contemporary Art Expo Malaysia, Kuala Lumpur, Malaysia, 2008

=== Singapore ===
- Gnani Arts Gallery, Singapore, 2009

=== Laos ===
- MB Art Gallery in Vientiane, Laos, 2006

=== India ===
- Ahuja Museum for Arts, Calcutta, India, (permanent exhibition).

== Notes and references ==
- «Le monde est petit, c'est pourquoi il est fantastique», interview of Stéphane Delaprée by Gilles Angers, page E-9, in Le Soleil (section Crayons de Soleil), mercredi 20 novembre 1985, Québec;
- Canuck comics, a Guide to Comic Books Published in Canada, 1986, John Bell, Luc Pomerleau et Robert MacMillan, éditions Matrix Books, Montréal;
- «La bande dessinée au Québec», 1994, Mira Falardeau, éditions du Boréal, collection Boréal Express, Montréal;
- «Bande dessinée québécoise» : répertoire bibliographique à suivre, 1996, Bernard Dubois, éditions D.B.K., Sillery;
- «BDQ, Répertoire des publications de bandes dessinées au Québec des origines à nos jours», 1999, Michel Viau, éditions Mille-Îles, Laval;
- «Histoire de la bande dessinée au Québec», 2008, Mira Falardeau, VLB éditeur, collection Études québécoises, Montréal.
