= Vic Roschkov Sr. =

Canadian cartoonist

Vic Roschkov Sr. is a Canadian editorial cartoonist and illustrator, now living in London, Ontario, Canada.

Born in Kyiv in the Soviet Ukraine, he was raised in Windsor, Ontario before moving to London, Ontario, as a young adult and later began his career in journalism at the Windsor Star in the early 1970s. Roschkov subsequently moved to the Toronto Star where he won the prestigious National Newspaper Award for cartooning in 1980—the first time that he'd submitted an editorial cartoon for consideration.

Roschkov later worked for the Edmonton Sun.

Roschkov has had a selection of his cartoons published by Prentice-Hall and for many years was staff cartoonist at the Edmonton Sun. Numerous Roschkov editorial cartoons have been acquired by the National Archives of Canada and are now part of its permanent collection in Ottawa, Ontario.

Vic Roschkov Sr. has two sons: Vic is also a notable artist living in London, Ontario, and Tom is a musician who lives in Edmonton.
