= Jon Tucker =

Canadian filmmaker and journalist

- Born: Canada
- Occupation(s): Screenwriter, journalist, novelist

Jon Tucker is a Canadian screenwriter, filmmaker, and journalist who was named "Best Local Filmmaker" by the Montreal Mirror in 2000. Tucker is a graduate of the Canadian Film Centre, produced plays for the Montreal Fringe Festival, performed script coverage for Movie Central, and was co-screenwriter for the Showcase situation-comedy The Foundation.

Tucker has also written book and film reviews for the Montreal Mirror, Hour and Vice. In 2012, Tucker published his debut novel, Putz of the Century with Fast Hands Press.

Since 2004, Tucker has made regular appearances on CBC Radio One's comedy program WireTap.
