= James Simpkins =

Canadian cartoonist and artist

- Born: James Nathaniel Simpkins; November 26, 1910 Winnipeg, Manitoba, Canada
- Died: February 1, 2004 (aged 93)
- Area: Cartoonist
- Notable works: Jasper the Bear

James Nathaniel Simpkins (November 26, 1910 – February 1, 2004) was a Winnipeg-born cartoonist and artist. He was one of the original artists at the National Film Board of Canada where he worked for many years before launching a successful freelancing career. His cartoon character Jasper the Bear was famous throughout Canada from 1948 to 1972 and remains as the mascot of Jasper National Park.

== Youth ==
James Simpkins' father, Arthur, was a proofreader for a Winnipeg newspaper and his mother, Mary, looked after the family which included James and his two older brothers. He attended Luxton public school and began by drawing in his school books. He attended the Winnipeg School of Art and studied under Group of Seven artist LeMoine FitzGerald.

== Career ==
His professional life began by contributing to the Hudson's Bay's company magazine and submitting cartoons to Macleans. He was drafted into the army in World War II, but was still able to continue to make use of his artistic skills. He was with the Signal Corps security and intelligence group producing training posters and film strips. He recounted that during this period, on a trip to New York for training with the U.S. Signal Corps, he met Charles Addams who had just begun to sell cartoons to The New Yorker. After the war, he became one of the original animators of the National Film Board in Ottawa where he worked for 16 years.

In 1948, he began a regular cartoon feature for Maclean's magazine, Jasper the Bear, which would prove to be his most famous and enduring creation. In 1955, Simpkins provided the artwork for a 5¢ Canadian stamp which was the idea of Canadian hockey great and member of parliament Lionel Conacher. The stamp featured three Canadian hockey players in action. On August 6, 1962, while living in Beaconsfield, Montreal he began a thrice-weekly cartoon feature for the Montreal Gazette called Simpkins' Montreal.

He eventually moved to Toronto where he continued freelancing to the Toronto Star, ad agencies, book illustration, and numerous magazines in Canada and the US. His clients have included General Motors, The National Enquirer and Jasper the Bear has been used by the Boy Scouts of Canada and Jasper National Park. He had five collections of his cartoons published in book form. Four collections of his Jasper cartoons and also his medical cartoons from The Medical Post, When's The Last Time You Cleaned Your Navel?, were published. He also provided the illustrations for other writers' books, most frequently for Canadian humourist Eric Nicol.

=== Jasper the Bear ===
His most famous creation was the cartoon Jasper the Bear which appeared in Maclean's magazine for over 20 years and became popular across Canada. The character first appeared in the November 15, 1948 issue and ran as a regular feature until 1968. It was then syndicated by Canada Wide Features running in newspapers across Canada for four more years until Simpkins retired in 1972. Jasper was also featured in several books.

Simpkins' anthropomorphic Jasper was an urbane, friendly bear with a wife and two cubs. A typical Jasper cartoon involved a hibernating Jasper being woken by a golf ball flying into the den and hitting him in the head. Jasper, happily calls out to his sleeping family, "Wake up, everyone. It's spring." On another occasion, Jasper approached a beehive cup in hand saying to the swarm, "Could I borrow a cup of honey?"

In 1962, Jasper was adopted as the official mascot for Jasper National Park in Alberta erecting a statue of Jasper at the train station. Jasper cartoons were also reprinted internationally in England, Belgium, France, Germany, Italy and Mexico. In the 1960s Jasper's copyright was sold to Irwin Toys who produced a line of Jasper toys. In 1968, Jasper was used as the official mascot of the charity The United Appeal. As part of their fundraising campaign, Jasper visited various locations including Parliament Hill in Ottawa. This larger-than-life Jasper, a live person in a costume, had his picture taken hugging Canadian Prime Minister Pierre Trudeau.

In 1968, a seven-year-old Ottawa boy was being sent to Boston's Children's Hospital Medical Centre for corrective heart surgery paid for by private charity. In a gesture of encouragement Prime Minister Pierre Trudeau gave the boy a picture with the words "A thousand best wishes". It was a picture of the Prime Minister with Jasper the Bear.

In 2004, vandals damaged a statue of Jasper the Bear which had been a local landmark for 40 years, but the statue was replaced and moved to a more secure location 160m due north of the Jasper Information Centre. The Mayor of Jasper was quoted as saying that vandalism is not unknown to the area, but until now, "not to poor ol' Jasper". Jasper continues as a promotional tool of Jasper tourism. Having one's picture taken with the statue of Jasper is still a must-have photo when visiting Jasper and, keeping up with the times, Jasper is even on Twitter.

In 2005, in celebration of Alberta's centennial, a Jasper the Bear coin was issued.

== Personal life ==
James Simpkins was married to Ethel Mary Thom who died in 2001. They had five children and at the time of his death he had ten grandchildren and seven great grandchildren.

Simpkins died on February 1, 2004, at the age of 93, in Dundas, Ontario. Canadian cartoonists have argued that Simpkins has failed to fully get the recognition he deserves. For example, despite his major contribution to Maclean's Magazine, they neglected to mention him or Jasper in their anniversary issue.

== Books ==
=== Cartoon collections ===
- Simpkins, James (1954). Jasper. Toronto: Ryerson Press. OCLC 13589401. Subsequently reprinted by Rinehart (1960) and McClelland & Stewart (1972).
- Simpkins, James (1970). Jasper and the cubs. Toronto: Copp Clark. OCLC 63096595.
- Simpkins, James (1976). When's the last time your cleaned your navel?. Hamilton: Potlatch Publications. p. 112. ISBN 0-919676-07-3.

=== Illustrated ===
- Eric Nicol (1953). Twice over lightly. Illustrated by James Simpkins. Toronto: Ryerson Press. p. 137. OCLC 876136.
- Stuart Hemsley (1954). Beastly Ballads. Illustrated by James Simpkins. Toronto: Burns and MacEachern. p. 63. OCLC 61654667.
- Eric Nicol (1955). Shall we join the ladies?. Illustrated by James Simpkins. Toronto: Ryerson Press. p. 156. OCLC 25443171.
- Eric Nicol (1957). Girdle me a globe. Illustrated by James Simpkins. Toronto: Ryerson Press. p. 134. OCLC 63784.
- Eric Nicol (1959). In darkest Domestica. Illustrated by James Simpkins. Toronto: Ryerson Press. p. 113. OCLC 6217822.
- Dudley Copland (1965). Ookpik the Ogling Arctic Owl. Illustrated by James Simpkins. Montreal: Canadian Century Publishers. p. 44. OCLC 49021775.
- Betty Sanders Garner (1976). Canada's Monsters. Illustrated by James Simpkins and John MacLeod; Initials by Laura Piotrowski. Hamilton: Potlach Publications. p. 95. ISBN 0-919676-06-5.
- Eleanor A. Ellis (1979). Northern cookbook. Illustrated by James Simpkins. Edmonton: Hurtig Publishers. p. 358. ISBN 0-88830-178-2.
