= Chapterhouse Comics =

Canadian comic book publisher

Chapterhouse Comics Group
- Predecessor: Lev Gleason Publications
- Founded: 2015
- Founder: Fadi Hakim
- Defunct: 2020
- Country of origin: Canada
- Headquarters location: Toronto, Ontario
- Distribution: Diamond Book Distributors
- Key people: Fadi Hakim; Richard Comely; Kalman Andrasofszky; Jay Baruchel
- Publication types: Comics
- Official website: chapterhouse.ca

Chapterhouse Comics was a Canadian comic book publishing company that publishes books featuring classic Canadian comic book characters such as Captain Canuck and Northguard in a unified comic book universe.

In 2020, Chapterhouse was acquired by Lev Gleason Publications. The Chapterverse was rebranded as the Comic House Universe, and introduced golden age Lev Gleason characters Silver Streak and Daredevil, as well as Crimebuster and Captain Battle, who debuted in Captain Canuck Season Four: Invasion.

== Imprints ==
=== Chapterverse ===
Comic House publishes the following characters, comics, and books under the Lev Gleason banner:

- Captain Canuck #1-21 (2015-2020)
  - Captain Canuck Year One #1-4, Kebec, Redcoat (2018)
- The Pitiful Human-Lizard #1-17 (2015-2018)
- Northguard #1-8 (2016-2018)
- Agents of PACT #1-4 (2017)
- Freelance #1-4 (2017)
- Fantomah #1-4 (2017)
- Fallen Suns #1-4 (2017)

==== Other Titles ====
- All-New Classic Captain Canuck #0-5 (2016)
  This is a continuation of the original Captain Canuck series.
- Die Kitty Die! #1-4 (2016)
  - Die Kitty Die! Christmas Special (2017)
  - Die Kitty Die! Summer Vacation (2017)
  - Die Kitty Die: Hollywood or Bust #1-4 (2017)
  - Die Kitty Die! Heaven & Hell #0-5 (2018)
- Brooklyn Gladiator Omnibus (2018)
- Fourth Planet #1-5 (2016)
- Life, Death & Sorcery #1-4 (2016)
- Moon Lake Omnibus (2019)
- Spirit Leaves #1-5 (2016)
- True Patriot Presents #1-13 (2016-2019)
