= Louis Paradis =

Canadian comics artist, writer and illustrator

- Born: July 6, 1959 (age 67) Montmagny, Quebec, Canada
- Areas: Writer, Penciller, Artist, Inker, Letterer, Colorist
- Awards: Grand prix Comic art Contest " Les Grands Voiliers " 1984; fifth distinction Prix Solaris 1984.

Louis Paradis (born July 6, 1959) is a Canadian comics artist, writer and illustrator from Montmagny, Quebec, Canada.

He is considered as a master in the realism comics field in Québec.

== Biography ==
Very young at the age of 15, Louis Paradis published his first comic book in 1974.

After he obtained his Degree in graphic design from CEGEP of Rivière-du-Loup, he learned the craft of comic book especially by observing the work of artists like John Buscema, Harold Foster, Burne Hogarth, Jean Giraud dit Moebius, Jack Kirby, Barry Windsor-Smith, and also André Juillard.

He made a few illustrations for the Québec science fiction magazine Solaris in the early 1980s.

In 1984, Louis Paradis wins first prize in the Comic art Contest " Les Grands Voiliers ", jointly organized by the daily newspaper Le Soleil and the Salon international du livre de Québec (International Book Fair of Quebec). He participated in the exhibition Et Vlan ! On s'expose... 15 ans de bande dessinée dans la région de Québec (Wham! We exhibit ... 15 years of comics in the Quebec City region) organized by the Société des Créateur(trice)s et Ami(e)s de la Bande Dessinée (a.k.a. ScaBD) (Society of Designers and Friends of the Comic Art) in 1985.

Later, Louis Paradis participated in the creation of the magazine Sextant, Québécois Comics periodical publication launched with the help of graphic design students in 1986. This does not prevent him from also contribute to the Québec comics magazine, Bambou.

He organized a major event, Le printemps de la bande dessinée (The Spring of the comic art) which takes place over several weeks at the Musée du Bas-Saint-Laurent in Rivière-du-loup in 1987.

On scripts from Anne Sigier, he produced comic albums in color on the theme of Christianity.

He participated in the adventure of Zine Zag comics magazine in 1998. Louis Paradis then joined the group Grafik Sismik in the late 1990s.

== Bibliography ==
=== Comic art ===
Albums

- La Rage de L'Eau-de-vie, 1974, Montmagny;
- Abraham et Moïse, 1993, as penciller and inker (script from Anne Sigier), éditions Anne Sigier, Québec city;
- Les premiers Chrétiens, 1998, as penciller and inker (script from Anne Sigier), éditions Anne Sigier, Québec city.

Periodical publications Magazines

- Titanic, Québec's comics magazine, 1984;
- Sextant, Québec's science-fiction comics magazine, 1986–1989;
- Bambou, lQuébec's comics magazine, 1987–1988;
- Jet, comics European magazine, Éditions du Lombard, 1989;
- Zine zag, 100% comics in Québec, 1998.

== Exhibitions ==
=== Group exhibitions ===
- 1985 : Vlam ! We exhibit ourselves... 15 years of Comic Art in the Québec city's region, Art Gallery La Passerelle, Sainte-Foy and I st International Salon of the Comic Art Montréal and Science fiction and Fantastic Congress Boréal VII;
- 1987 : The Spring of the Comic Art, Museum of Bas-Saint-Laurent, Rivière-du-loup;
- 1999 : Week of the Québec Comic Art, Louvain-la-Neuve (Belgium);
- 2000 : Grafik Sismik, Bar Le Scanner, Québec city;
- 2001 : The Conquest of Space, Québec Fantasy Video and Film Festival Vitesse Lumière IV, Québec city;
- 2001 : Scientifiktion, Bar Le Scanner, Québec city;
- 2009 : The 50 Years of Astérix and Obélix : a tribute, XXIInd Festival of the francophone comic art, Québec city.

== Awards ==
- 1984 : Grand prix (all categories), Comic art Contest " Les Grands Voiliers " (2000 participants), Salon international du Livre de Québec (Québec Annual International Book Show), for the story published in the magazine Titanic (issue number 8, May 1984) and in the daily newspaper Le Soleil;
- 1984 : Prix Solaris in the comic art category, fifth distinction for the story L'Incident (unpublished).

== See also ==
- Bande dessinée
- Canadian comics
- Quebec comic strips
