= Richard Comely =

Canadian comic book creator, penciller, inker, letterer, colorist, editor and publisher

- Born: October 9, 1950 (age 76) Oxford, England
- Areas: Cartoonist, Writer, Penciller, Inker, Editor, Letterer, Colourist
- Notable works: Captain Canuck

Richard Comely (born October 9, 1950) is a Canadian comic book creator, penciller, inker, letterer, colorist editor, and publisher. He created and wrote the Captain Canuck comic book series which has been in and out of publication since its original release in 1975. In 2011, Minds Eye Entertainment bought the rights Captain Canuck to produce a live-action film adaptation. In 2012, Comely entered into an exclusive licensing agreement with CEO of Chapterhouse Comics Fadi Hakim to produce animation, merchandise, and a new comic book series under Captain Canuck Incorporated.

== Life and career ==
Richard Comely was born in Oxford, England in 1950 and relocated to Canada as a child in 1953. Comely was baptized into the Church of Jesus Christ of Latter-day Saints (LDS Church) in 1971. Married since 1975 to Evelyn, Comely is the father of eight children. Comely had worked as a sign painter; crest designer; fashion and embroidery designer; an illustrator/paste-up artist for a printer; and a graphic designer for newspapers, magazines, and advertising. Comely has also written and illustrated children's books, syndicated newspaper features, and greeting cards. Comely has also published a newspaper. He designed and manufactures the ComelyCrane; a portable, extendable jib arm. He also produced a best-selling art education video "Drawing from the Pros".

He began publishing the Captain Canuck comic book series in early 1975 with co-creator Ron Leishman whom he met at an LDS Church meeting. It was the first independently published comic book to be printed in full color. Comely had no experience with comic books having never read or collected them as a child. Comely and Leishman had planned to create a Canadian-themed comic book based on Captain Canada as early as 1971, but were unable to obtain funding. The character was named Captain Canuck as a variation of Captain Canada. Despite being criticized for appearing to be a prank, the name was intended as a positive slang term for a Canadian.

Captain Canuck "[outsold] all other comic books in Canada in 1975," with 170,000 copies initially sent to stores and newsstands in the United States and Canada. Letters from the Canadian prime minister and the Canadian governor-general were published in issues of the series. As a member of the LDS Church, Comely used the comic book series as a proselytizing tool. He informed readers of his church membership in the first issue; reprinted an article from an LDS Church affiliated magazine called the Ensign in the second issue; and published missionary pamphlets and letters from Ron Leishman, who was serving a mission for the LDS Church at the time, in subsequent issues. The first issue of the series was criticized by Time magazine as "amateurish" with "often clumsy artwork and storyline". Two other issues were released in 1975 until Comely Comix went out of business the same year and left the comic at a cliffhanger because they were unable to keep up with publishing costs.

In 1979, Comely created CKR productions in Calgary and resumed publishing the series at issue four with Comely resuming his position as the writer. Comely delegated business management, artwork, and coloring to other employees, positions he originally held himself, in order to focus on improving the storyline. By issue five, Comely served as editor-in-chief. After 13 issues, in 1981, Comely left the production in order to return to freelance design. In 1982, he published a new comic series called Star Rider and the Peace Machine, but only two issues were released before the project folded. CRK productions only released one additional issue of Captain Canuck before closing down for financial issues and abandoning the series.

Comely and his production staff released Captain Canuck Reborn in 1993 which was intended to be a new series with different characters and a different origin story. However, Comely only released four issues before it and a Captain Canuck newspaper strip went out of publication in 1996 due to difficulties navigating the Canadian publishing industry. Comely served as editor of a limited Captain Canuck series called Captain Canuck: Unholy War in 2004, created by Riel and Drue Langlois. Comely released a new Captain Canuck series in summer 2006. In September 2006, Comely began instructing in comic books, storytelling, and comic strips at Mohawk College in Brantford, Ontario where he created a one-year course for comic book illustration and scripting.

According to the Panama City News Herald, Comely said that he has more interest in promoting his character Captain Canuck than creating new comics. In 2012, Richard entered into an exclusive licensing agreement with Fadi Hakim, CEO of Chapterhouse Comics to produce animation, merchandise, new Captain Canuck comic book series, and pursue licensing ventures under Captain Canuck Incorporated. In 2011, Minds Eye Entertainment acquired the right to Captain Canuck with intentions to adapt the series into a live-action film. In 2012, they hired Arne Olsen to write the screenplay; however, as of 2020, there have been no updates on the film adaptation.
