= Walter Ball (cartoonist) =

Canadian cartoonist (1911–1995)

- 1958 episode of Ball's Rural Route strip
- Born: 7 April 1911 Essa, Ontario, Canada
- Died: 18 February 1995 (aged 83) Richmond Hill, Ontario
- Area: Cartoonist
- Notable works: Rural Route

Walter George Ball (7 April 1911 – 18 February 1995) was a Canadian cartoonist. Ball was noted for the comic strip feature Rural Route, which became a familiar fixture in the Star Weekly between 1956 until the publication's demise in 1968. He was born in Essa, Ontario.

Ball, who grew up on a farm near Cookstown, Ontario, originally looked at electrical engineering as a career, but it was his application to the Toronto Daily Star, with only a few sample correspondence school art lessons, that got him hired as a graphic artist in 1932.

Early in his tenure at the Star, Ball (not yet a cartoonist) befriended legendary Canadian artist Jimmy Frise, who accepted a more lucrative offer from the Montreal Standard in the late 1940s. When the Star Weekly made a format change from broadsheet to tabloid in 1956, an editor asked Ball if he knew a cartoonist interested in creating a comic feature for the new publication. Ball suggested some names, but having always had a desire to enter the field, worked concurrently on his own strip. It was quickly accepted and one month into the new format, a reader survey indicated Rural Route had become the most read feature in the publication. It was syndicated by Miller Services to other local Canadian newspapers, and it also appeared in several newspapers in the Midwestern United States.

Featuring the woodsy adventures of a small town youth named Willie and his farm-dwelling Uncle Elmer and Aunt Myrtle, Ball drew largely on his own childhood farm experiences in creating and developing Rural Route. Ball, Frise and cartoonist Doug Wright are considered to be co-creators of a distinct Canadian comic strip style of that time, with ornately detailed drawings and a simple, folksy humour style.

When Rural Route and the Star Weekly folded in 1968, Ball continued in the Star's art department, being promoted to art director in 1970, and retired in 1976. He resided with his wife in the Toronto suburb of Richmond Hill until his death.
