= Northguard =

- New Triumph Featuring Northguard #1

Publication information
- Publisher: Matrix Graphics Series; Artworx; Caliber Comics; Dundurn Press; Moonstone Books; Chapterhouse Comics
- First appearance: New Triumph Featuring Northguard #1 (September 1984)
- Created by: Mark Shainblum; Gabriel Morrissette.

In-story information
- Alter ego: Phillip Wise
- Species: Human
- Place of origin: Montréal, Quebec, Canada
- Team affiliations: PACT Corporation
- Partnerships: Dr. Leila Alexander; Dr. Ron M. Cape; Manon Deschamps, aka Fleur de Lys; Dr. Eli Gilberson; Dr. Marilyn Hébert; Ed Holman, aka Steel Chameleon
- Notable aliases: Le Protecteur
- Abilities: Energy bolt projection; Force field generation; Teleportation

Northguard is a superhero, created by Mark Shainblum and Gabriel Morrissette, who originally appeared in Canadian comic books published by Matrix Graphics Series. Northguard made his first appearance in New Triumph Featuring Northguard #1 (September 1984).

Northguard is the costumed identity of Phillip "Phil" Wise, a video-store manager and comic-book enthusiast who was enlisted by Progressive Allied Canadian Technologies (PACT) Corporation to help them combat an extreme right-wing terrorist organization known as ManDes (an abbreviation for manifest destiny). that was bent on overthrowing the Canadian government. Working in secret, PACT had developed a revolutionary cybernetic personal-weapons system called the "Uniband". Wise was contacted when Karl Manning, the original wielder of the Uniband, was killed in a terrorist attack. Wise's brain patterns were similar enough to allow him to operate the device. Wise eventually agreed to be an agent of PACT only if he could do so as a costumed superhero. PACT accepted Wise's condition; and Northguard was born.

== Publication history ==
The first stories of Northguard appeared in New Triumph Featuring Northguard #1-5 published by Matrix Graphic Series between 1984 and 1986. These stories were collected and republished by Caliber Comics in 1989 as the trade paperback Northguard, Book One: Manifest Destiny. In 1989, Caliber published the three-issue series Northguard: ManDes Conclusion. The "Manifest Destiny" and "ManDes Conclusion" arcs were collected and republished by Chapterhouse Comics in 2015 as the Northguard Compendium. Chapterhouse planned to republish color versions of the original Northguard stories, but only Chapterhouse Archives: Northguard #1 was ever issued.

A standalone Northguard story was featured in Canadian Comics Cavalcade (Artworx, 1986). Northguard made a cameo appearance in The Northern Guard #1 (Moonstone Books, 2010).

In 2015, Canadian publisher Chapterhouse Comics launched a new comic book universe featuring rebooted versions of both Captain Canuck and Northguard. In 2016, Northguard made a number of guest appearances in Captain Canuck. Later that year, Chapterhouse published its first Northguard story arc. A second arc was published in 2017. The story arcs were collected in 2018 into the trade paperbacks Northguard, Volume One: Aurora Dawn and Northguard, Volume Two: Enemy of the States.

Date	Publication	Publisher
1984.09	New Triumph Featuring Northguard #1	Matrix Graphic Series
1985	New Triumph Featuring Northguard #2	Matrix Graphic Series
1985	New Triumph Featuring Northguard #3	Matrix Graphic Series
1986	New Triumph Featuring Northguard #4	Matrix Graphic Series
1986	New Triumph Featuring Northguard #5	Matrix Graphic Series
1986	Canadian Comics Cavalcade	Artworx
1989.09	Northguard, Book One: Manifest Destiny	Caliber Press
1989	Northguard: ManDes Conclusion #1	Caliber Press
1989	Northguard: ManDes Conclusion #2	Caliber Press
1990	Northguard: ManDes Conclusion #3	Caliber Press
2006	Invaders from the North: How Canada Conquered the Comic Book Universe	Dundurn Press
2010	The Northern Guard #1	Moonstone Books
2015.12	Northguard Compendium	Chapterhouse Comics
2016.04	Captain Canuck #8	Chapterhouse Comics
2016.06	Chapterhouse Archives: Northguard #1	Chapterhouse Comics
2016.08	Northguard #1	Chapterhouse Comics
2016.09	Northguard #2	Chapterhouse Comics
2016.10	Northguard #3	Chapterhouse Comics
2016.11	Captain Canuck #10	Chapterhouse Comics
2016.11	Northguard #4	Chapterhouse Comics
2016.12	Captain Canuck #11	Chapterhouse Comics
2017.05	Captain Canuck, Season Three #1	Chapterhouse Comics
2017.09	Northguard, Season Two #1	Chapterhouse Comics
2017.10	Northguard, Season Two #2	Chapterhouse Comics
2017.11	Northguard, Season Two #3	Chapterhouse Comics
2017.12	Northguard, Season Two #4	Chapterhouse Comics
2018.01	Captain Canuck, Season Three #2	Chapterhouse Comics
2018.05	Invasion	Chapterhouse Comics
2018.06	Northguard, Volume One: Aurora Dawn	Chapterhouse Comics
2018.06	Northguard, Volume Two: Enemy of the States	Chapterhouse Comics

== Fictional character biography ==
=== Original series ===
==== Manifest Destiny ====
Begun in the anthology series New Triumph, the Northguard series centred on the misadventures of Philip Wise, a young Montreal resident of European Jewish ancestry, who had found himself caught up in the efforts of a private corporation's senior staff to defeat a conspiracy known collectively as "ManDes" (from the term "manifest destiny") to force Canada and the United States to merge under a quasi-Christian theocratic dictatorship with elements borrowed from white supremacist doctrine.

Wise was recruited as the corporation's field agent as a result of the murder of another operative, who was the only one neurologically equipped to use a unique energy weapon, called the "Uniband", built as an offshoot of applied physics experimentation. Wise's single condition for agreeing to do so was the creation of a "superhero" identity: Northguard. Wise later improvised the name Le Protecteur as a more suitable French language version.

Successfully defeating an assassination attempt on the Premier of Quebec in his first mission, Wise subsequently found himself and his newfound colleagues stumbling through several misadventures, accidentally inspiring a martial arts/dance instructor whom Wise became acquainted with to create the identity of Fleur de Lys. These misadventures led ultimately to the defeat of the ManDes conspiracy and the destruction of the Uniband, effectively leaving Wise without any technological advantages. The whole ManDes affair was covered up at the insistence of the Canadian and American governments, allegedly for reasons of preserving cross-border trade.

== Powers, abilities, and equipment ==
Northguard is athletic and in good physical shape. He is a capable hand-to-hand combatant but has no formal training. Northguard is bilingual in French and English.

=== The Uniband ===
Northguard wields the Uniband, the first weapon ever created by the PACT Corporation. It operates on a principle that was discovered by accident and appears to be a loophole in the laws of thermodynamics. Theories vary as to how the Uniband actually works. Dr. Eli Gilberson believes the device taps the output of a white hole. Dr. Ron Cape theorized that the Uniband warps the fabric of spacetime and is therefore not bound by the laws of physics as we understand them. The device does not need to be recharged and appears to have an unlimited source of energy.

In its dormant state, the Uniband is a metal hexagonal prism. A retractable power cable plugs into a cybernetic port in the bicep of Phillip Wise's right arm. Once plugged in, the ends of the device iris open allowing Wise to slip the Uniband onto his upper arm.

Although the device is plugged into Northguard's voluntary nervous system, there have been indications of spillover from his autonomic nervous system in moments of anxiety. This manifests itself in a series of ascending arrhythmic pulses in the device's power curve, all congruent to his mental state. In other words, Northguard's power increases when he is stressed.

==== Unipulses ====
Northguard can direct the Uniband to fire bolts of an unknown luminous energy down his right arm. Each unipulse imparts considerable kinetic force as well as an electrical charge. A typical pulse can knock a man off of his feet. A strong pulse is capable of disintegrating cinderblock. A pulse can deliver an electroshock capable of rendering assailants unconscious. The electricity can also pass through Northguard's glove and discharge it on physical contact. Northguard has the ability to adjust the power level of the pulses through an act of will. The Uniband fires with no discernible recoil.

==== Forcefields ====
Northguard can generate defensive forcefields made of plasma. The fields are circular, semitransparent, and vary in size from a small buckler to a large riot shield. The fields are produced through concentrated effort and disperse when they are no longer needed. Northguard determines the size of the field by drawing an arc in the air with his right arm. However, a field can be summoned without the movement. High-velocity projectiles such as bullets disintegrate on impact. Objects moving at lower velocities, such as thrown weapons, are deflected.

==== Plasma form ====
When the Uniband's built-in safeties were disabled, Northguard's body transformed into luminous plasma. In this form, he possessed superhuman strength and was capable of teleportation.

=== Costume ===
Northguard's costume is summoned into existence when Phillip Wise combines with the Uniband. The costume warps in and displaces Wise's clothes and the contents of his pockets (e.g. keys, change, wallet, etc.). The warp effect is accompanied by a light flare, bright enough to cause flash blindness.

Northguard's costume consists of a skin-tight bodystocking with an integrated mask that conceals his upper face. His torso and head are in red. Northguard's leggings and full-length gloves are white. The large fields of red and white are offset by a wide, purple hip-belt. The costume features a large white maple-leaf emblem on his chest and a smaller version on his mask. The tops of Northguard's red mid-calf boots are decoratively cut to continue the maple-leaf motif.

The right sleeve of the costume has added shielding to protect Northguard's arm from the forces generated by the Uniband. The sleeve is equipped with a high-tensile cable that can be launched from the inner wrist. The cable's endpoint can be modified to serve as either a grappling hook or a taser.

=== Mini-com ===
PACT outfitted Phillip Wise with a wireless two-way communications device resembling a hearing aid and worn behind his ear. The device was powerful enough to establish a clear link between the PACT headquarters in Vaudreuil and Wise's home in Montreal, 44 kilometers away.

== Post-publication history ==
In 1995, Canada Post Corporation released a collection of postage stamps celebrating "made-in-Canada" superheroes including Fleur de Lys.

== See also ==
- Captain Canuck
- Johnny Canuck
