= Margaret Atwood: Once in August =

1984 film

- Directed by: Michael Rubbo
- Written by: Michael Rubbo; Merrily Weisbord
- Produced by: Barrie Howells; Michael Rubbo
- Starring: Margaret Atwood
- Cinematography: Andreas Poulsson; Zoe Dirse
- Edited by: Michael Rubbo
- Production company: National Film Board of Canada
- Release date: 1984
- Running time: 58 minutes
- Country: Canada
- Language: English

Margaret Atwood: Once in August is a 1984 documentary about Canadian writer Margaret Atwood, directed by Michael Rubbo and produced by the National Film Board of Canada (NFB). The film was made in Rubbo's style of self-conscious documentary filmmaking or metafilm.

== Story ==
The film follows Rubbo's efforts to uncover the secrets of Atwood's past, only to be frustrated when the author's life fails to provide any biographical clues for her work. Atwood deflects Rubbo's autobiographical questioning with relative ease, while offering no evidence that her work can be interpreted according to her personal life. In one sequence, Atwood mocks Rubbo's planned narrative trajectory when she and her family take control of the camera. Atwood puts a paper bag over her head as family members take turns asking "who is this woman?", providing humorous responses and poking fun at Rubbo's filmmaking approach.

The following year, Rubbo released a 30-minute film entitled Atwood and Family.

== Reception ==
The Canadian Film Encyclopedia called the film "unconvincing," stating that it "put an end to his remarkable run of personal documentaries. There is an unmistakable sense in the Atwood film that Rubbo had exhausted the form. Atwood remained distant, and Rubbo never really made contact with her as a subject."
