= Caroline Parker =

English actress and comedian

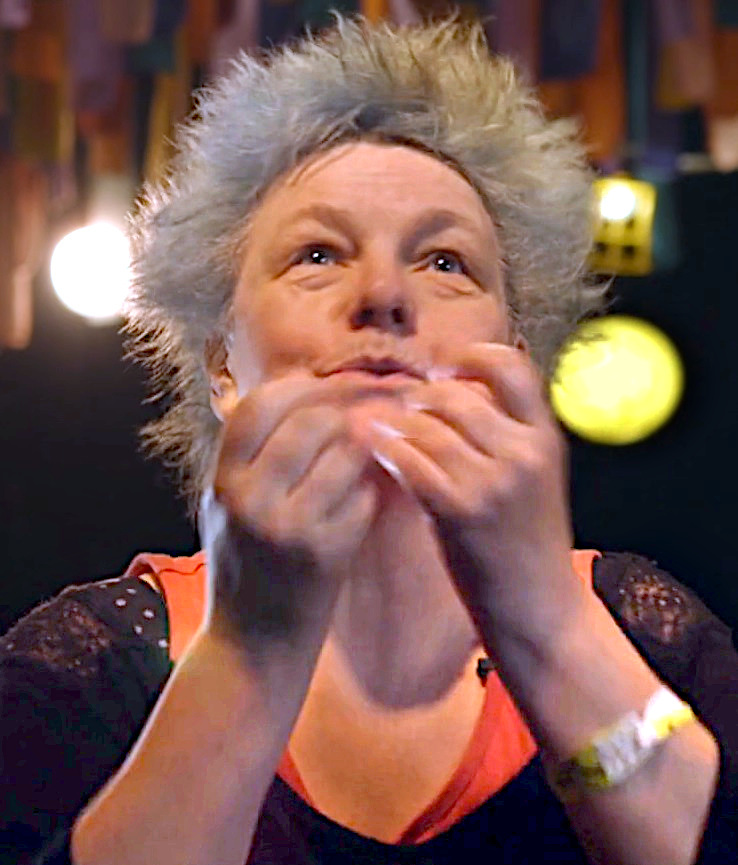
Caroline Parker 2019

Caroline Parker is an English actress, comedian and performer. She is deaf and a British Sign Language user.

== Early life ==
Parker was born in Cheshire to a hearing family. As a child, she enjoyed dance classes. After attending mainstream schools with Partially Hearing Units, she took part of an experimental teaching programme at Manchester University, under which she received speech therapy.

She attended Manchester Youth Theatre for three years and decided to pursue a career in theatre. She enrolled for a course on Foundation Drama and Theatre at a college in Salford. She was advised by her tutor to focus on mime. In 1982 Parker moved to London to train at Adam Darius' Mime Centre, followed by more training at Desmond Jones School of Mime.

== Career ==
Parker landed her first acting job with Interim Theatre, quickly learning sign language to play Clarice in The Servant of Two Masters which opened at the Edinburgh Fringe Festival.

She has extensively worked in theatre, most recently with such companies as Graeae Theatre, Red Earth, Fittings Multi Media Arts, Fingersmiths and Deafinitely Theatre.

Parker was commissioned a one-woman show, Signs of a Star Shaped Diva, by Theatre Royal Stratford East and The New Wolsey Theatre Ipswich. The show featured her signature sign songs and toured theatres around the UK. Parker has also performed her cabaret act, The Silent Diva, bringing her sign songs at such festivals as Glastonbury, WOMAD and Liberty Festivals. She appears as a stand-up comedian under the name of Caro Sparks. As well as acting and performing, she delivers drama or sign songs workshop and has experience in direction.

Parker has also made appearances on TV programmes such as My Hero, Murphy's Law and as Sue in the BBC drama series Switch, as well as in Louis Neethling's film Fairy Tale of London Town playing the role of Veronica. For her role in for Jean St Clair's film 'If I Don't Lose...', Parker won the Best Actress Award at the Clin d'œil Festival 2015.

Parker was invited to perform at the opening ceremony of the 2012 Paralympic Games, signing I Am What I Am along with singers Lizzie Emeh and Beverley Knight. Thousands joined in.

She received an MBE in the 2012 New Year Honours for her service to deaf theatre. In April 2021, she appeared in an episode of the BBC soap opera Doctors as prison guard Melanie Truman.
