= Geoff Stirling =

Canadian businessman (1921–2013)

Geoff Stirling ONL
- Born: Geoffrey William Stirling; March 22, 1921; St. John's, Dominion of Newfoundland
- Died: December 21, 2013 (aged 92)
- Education: University of Tampa
- Occupation: Businessman
- Known for: CJON-TV; CHOZ-FM; The Newfoundland Herald; Captain Canada
- Spouse: Joyce Cutler Stirling
- Children: Scott Stirling, Anne Stirling, Greg Stirling, Shawn Stirling Schuck, Jean Fox Stirling, Kimberley Michelle Stirling
- Relatives: Lydia McLaughlin (granddaughter)

Geoffrey William Stirling ONL (March 22, 1921 – December 21, 2013) was a Canadian-American businessman and media magnate, best known for his work in his home city of St. John's, Newfoundland.

== Life ==
Stirling was born in St. John's to Edgar Stirling and Ethel (Uphill) Stirling. Stirling attended the University of Tampa and began his media career as a stringer for Time and the Chicago Tribune. Stirling retained close ties to the United States throughout his lifetime, including a second winter home in Arizona in his later years. After his brief time in American media, Stirling spent a brief time in Honduras hunting alligators for skin. He hated the job, but was inspired when he noted that The Miami Herald was available there; this lead Stirling to conclude that a Newfoundland newspaper would be viable.

Stirling was a co-founder in the Economic Union Party, a late-1940s political movement that sought closer ties to the United States for the Dominion of Newfoundland, which was then still independent from Canada. It was one of two organizations that unsuccessfully opposed the dominion's confederation into Canada, which eventually occurred in 1949. The leader of the confederation forces, Joey Smallwood, was an established rival of Stirling's, having doubted that Stirling's newspaper would succeed because Smallwood himself had failed. Stirling argued that Smallwood's overtly political polemics had alienated readers and that a newspaper would need to appeal to a broad audience to succeed.

== Media businesses ==
Along with other members of his family, Stirling owned several media outlets in the Canadian province of Newfoundland and Labrador under the corporate brand Stirling Communications International. Specifically, the properties are independent television station CJON-DT; radio station CHOZ-FM; and the Newfoundland Herald, a weekly news, gossip and TV listings magazine.

Stirling pioneered many television firsts in North America. CJON-TV (NTV) was the first in Newfoundland to air programs in colour. CJON-TV became the first station to broadcast 24 hours a day in 1972.

Stirling was also the founder of CKGM, an English-language radio station in Montreal, in 1959. He owned the station until 1985.

== Personal views ==
Stirling is regarded as an eccentric for both how he managed his businesses and for how he used his media outlets to promote a variety of personal interests such as eastern mysticism and intestinal health. For example, he devoted many hours of, often unscheduled, broadcast time to conversations with gurus such as Ram Dass and Swami Shyam and to a variety of esoteric subjects ranging from pyramids to unidentified flying objects, a practice which continues today as the station is run by his son G. Scott Stirling. Geoff's grandson, Jesse is the host of the CJON interview program "Meetings with Remarkable People." Many of his past interviews and archives can be seen currently on CJON on Saturday mornings from 2:00AM to 4:00AM Newfoundland time, under the name "Captain Atlantis Late Night." When Stirling watched his own television station, he would sometimes phone Master Control to order that a favorite tape immediately pre-empt the current broadcast or that the technician apply a particular effect to the screen.

Stirling appeared in the 1974 documentary film Waiting for Fidel about a trip he made to Cuba along with former Newfoundland premier Joey Smallwood and director Michael Rubbo. The trio never met the Cuban leader. Many segments of the program involve Smallwood and Stirling discussing what they would like to ask Castro whenever the expected meeting happens. Some of the dialogue occurs while Stirling is demonstrating yoga and standing on his head while he is conversing with Smallwood.

Stirling supervised the creation of the graphic novel Atlantis featuring the superheroes Captain Atlantis (Captain Newfoundland) and Captain Canada, drawing on elements of Canadian history as well as ancient alien astronauts mythology and New Age philosophy. Captain Canada has become a mascot for the NTV station and has appeared in television programs, commercials, and numerous public events.

== Later life ==
In 2001, Stirling was inducted into the CAB Broadcast Hall of Fame; in 2009, he was awarded the Order of Newfoundland and Labrador. In his later years, Stirling split his time between Torbay, Newfoundland and Labrador, and his ranch in Wickenburg, Arizona, where he once owned (now defunct) Wickenburg radio station KSWW. Stirling died at the age of 92 on December 21, 2013. He was predeceased by his daughter, Kimberley Michelle, who died at age 19 in 1977.

== Film ==
Stirling is the subject of the forthcoming documentary Captain Newfoundland: Transmissions from the Tip of Atlantis. The film will have its world premiere at the 2026 edition of the Atlantic International Film Festival. Directed by Canadian filmmakers Jamie Miller and Mike Feehan, it is described as "an illuminating and wildly entertaining portrait of Newfoundland media mogul Geoff Stirling."
