= The Banishing =

- Directed by: Christopher Smith
- Written by: David Beton; Ray Lines; Dean Bogdanovich
- Produced by: Laurie Cook; Jason Newmark; Maya Amsellem; Sharon Harel
- Starring: Jessica Brown Findlay; John Heffernan; John Lynch; Sean Harris
- Cinematography: Sarah Cunningham
- Edited by: Richard Smither
- Music by: Toydrum
- Production companies: WestEnd Films; Bigscope; Umedia
- Distributed by: Shudder; Vertigo Releasing
- Release dates: 12 October 2020 (Sitges Film Festival); 26 March 2021 (United Kingdom)
- Running time: 97 minutes
- Country: United Kingdom
- Box office: $563,672

The Banishing is a 2020 British gothic horror film directed by Christopher Smith, starring Jessica Brown Findlay, John Heffernan, John Lynch and Sean Harris. It premiered at the Sitges Film Festival and London FrightFest Film Festival in October 2020, before being released digitally in the United Kingdom on 26 March 2021. The movie revolves around a haunted-house horror set in the lead up to World War II.

== Plot ==
In 1935 England, a vicar living in Morley Hall murders his wife in a fit of jealousy and then takes his own life. Bishop Malachi asks the town physician to cover up the crime. Three years later, the new vicar, Linus Forster, moves into Morley Hall with his new wife Marianne and her young daughter Adelaide, who was born out of wedlock and masquerades as her niece. The couple's relationship becomes strained due to Linus's struggle with intimacy, which he perceives as a sin. Meanwhile, Adelaide starts experiencing supernatural occurrences in the house. She's seen playing with strange dolls in the shape of monks and talking to invisible people. The mirrors in the house give delayed reflections, and soon Marianne starts to have unsettling hallucinations of shadowy figures, as well as premonitions, including the violent death of their deaf housekeeper Betsy. Marianne also relives traumatic memories of a time when she was institutionalized in a mental asylum during her pregnancy.

Occultist Harry Reed, who has extensively investigated the house's sinister history, warns Linus about it. The site originally hosted a monastery of the Minassian Order, which performed dark rituals and used torture to punish those who were deemed sinners. Bishop Malachi strongly objects to Harry's interference and openly threatens him. Harry answers denouncing Malachi's Nazi sympathies in public. Malachi arranges for Harry to be assaulted by two thugs under his service.

Marianne is encouraged by Betsy to meet with Harry, who's wounded but still refuses to leave. Harry warns Marianne that the house will turn its residents against one another, so the family should leave for their own safety. Back at the house, Linus is investigating his predecessor's death and discovers Malachi had lied to him, claiming the previous vicar and his family had moved to Australia. He also experiences a supernatural vision of Marianne committing adultery. This prompts a jealous argument between him and Marianne, particularly after he discovers that she has met with Harry. The following day, Marianne receives a visit from Malachi. He reveals to have been the one who returned Adelaide to her, after Adelaide was sent to an orphanage as a baby while Marianne was in the mental hospital. He also orchestrated Marianne's meeting with Linus and his current posting at Morley Hall. Malachi threatens to use his power to again take Adelaide away from Marianne if she were to try to leave the house.

Marianne's relationship with Adelaide grows increasingly sour, as the child has begun to talk to an unseen figure she claims is her real mother. The child then goes missing after walking into a mirror. Marianne unsuccessfully tries to seek help from a drunk Linus before approaching Harry, who agrees to help her. When they return to the house, they find that Betsy has been murdered by the now-possessed Linus, who is now in a trance. The murder scene is the same from Marianne's vision. Harry is able to pull Linus back to lucidity and explains that Adelaide has been abducted by the spirit of a pregnant woman who was murdered by the Minassian monks, as she was carrying their child. Linus performs a ritual from a book he retrieved among the previous vicar's possessions, to help Marianne retrieve Adelaide and confront the spirits haunting the house. Marianne is forced to experience nightmarish visions, some of which are related to her past, during which she proclaims that she is unashamed of what she has done. She manages to find and retrieve Adelaide, promising the murdered woman that they will give her and the unborn child a proper burial. They make good on their promise, however Bishop Malachi is shown at some later point digging up the bodies and delivering them to Nazi officials in Stuttgart.

== Cast ==
- Jessica Brown Findlay as Marianne Forster
- John Heffernan as Linus Forster
- John Lynch as Bishop Malachi
- Sean Harris as Harry Reed, inspired by real occultist Harry Price
- Anya McKenna-Bruce as Adelaide Forster
- Adam Hugill as Frank Peerless
- Jean St Clair as Betsy
- Jason Thorpe as Dr. Sutter

== Production ==
The Banishing was announced in September 2017, with UK-based The Fyzz Facility revealed to be financing it and WestEnd Films to produce. It was introduced at the 2017 Toronto International Film Festival. Jessica Brown Findlay and Sean Harris were revealed to be starring in October 2018, and principal photography began on 5 November 2018.

== Release ==
The film premiered at the 2020 Sitges Film Festival in Spain on 12 October 2020, and then in the United Kingdom at the London FrightFest Film Festival on 22 October, where it impressed critics. It was then released across the United Kingdom on premium video-on-demand services by Vertigo Releasing, on 26 March 2021.

== Reception ==
On review aggregation website Rotten Tomatoes, the film holds an approval rating of 62% based on 60 reviews, with an average rating of 5.8/10. The website's critics consensus reads: "The Banishing never truly taps into its full potential, although this gothic haunted house story still exudes a certain stately chill." Metacritic, which uses a weighted average, assigned the film a score of 48 out of 100 based on nine critics, indicating "mixed or average reviews".

RogerEbert.com gave it a rating of two stars. In summary, it said that while it has the potential to be a terrifying, surreal experience, the film falls short due to poor character development, weak storytelling and lackluster cinematography. Despite a few strong performances, including Sean Harris as a local psychic, the movie fails to capture the audience's attention and instead leaves them wondering what else is on Shudder.

The IndieWire gave it a rating of 2.5 stars. It said: "Sean Harris steals the show as occultist Harry Price, but Christopher Smith's gothic horror film isn't scary enough to subvert its clichés."

The Guardian gave it a rating of three stars. In summary, it said that although the scares are standard for a gothic horror film, the director manages to create an unnerving atmosphere, and Jessica Brown Findlay's performance as Marianne holds the film together.
