= CJON-DT =

Television station in St. John's, Newfoundland and Labrador

- St. John's, Newfoundland and Labrador; Canada
- Channels: Digital: 21 (UHF); Virtual: 21
- Branding: NTV; NTV News

Programming
- Subchannels: 21.1: NTV HD; 21.2: CHOZ-FM simulcast
- Affiliations: Global (entertainment and news programming); CTV (news and sports programming); Yes TV / indieNET (entertainment programming)

Ownership
- Owner: Stirling Communications International; (Newfoundland Broadcasting Company Ltd.)
- Sister stations: CHOZ-FM

History
- First air date: September 6, 1955
- Former call signs: CJON-TV (1955–2011)
- Former channel numbers: Analog: 6 (VHF, 1955–2011)
- Former affiliations: CBC Television (1955–1964); CTV (primary, 1964–2002); Global (secondary, 1974–2002); CH/E! (2002–2009)
- Call sign meaning: derived from former sister station CJON, now CJYQ

Technical information
- Licensing authority: CRTC
- ERP: 482.3 kW
- HAAT: 254.6 m (835 ft)
- Transmitter coordinates: 47°31′31″N 52°42′48″W

Links
- Website: ntv.ca

CJON-DT (channel 21), branded NTV (short for Newfoundland Television), is an independent television station in St. John's, Newfoundland and Labrador, Canada, owned by Newfoundland Broadcasting Company Ltd. The station's studios are located on Logy Bay Road in St. John's, and its transmitter is located in the city's Shea Heights section.

== History ==
In 1955, Newfoundland Broadcasting Company Ltd., owner of CJON radio, applied for and received a licence for the first television station in Newfoundland. Newfoundland Broadcasting was jointly owned by Geoff Stirling and Don Jamieson. The station went on the air later that year on September 6, as a CBC Television affiliate. It was Newfoundland and Labrador's first television station, and remains the province's only privately owned television station to this day. Stirling has contended that this was the only group willing to invest in such a station, although other sources have suggested that Stirling and Jamieson used their political connections to prevent the CBC from opening its own station in Newfoundland first. This scenario is somewhat unlikely because until 1958, the CBC was both the primary broadcast regulator in Canada and a broadcaster in its own right, the former role taken over in 1958 by the independent Board of Broadcast Governors (the forerunner of the CRTC). However, the CBC-owned CBYT in Corner Brook launched soon after, in 1959. When it began operations, CJON's first studios and offices were located at the Prince of Wales Building in Buckmaster's Circle and the transmitter on Kenmount Road.

In any event, the CBC launched CBNT in 1964, and CJON became an affiliate of the new CTV network. During the mid-1970s, it was known as "NBC", for the "Newfoundland Broadcasting Company", until 1978 when WLBZ-TV, the Bangor affiliate of the U.S.-based National Broadcasting Company, became available on cable (to be replaced later by WDIV-TV from Detroit, then WHDH from Boston and eventually WBTS-LD/CD also from Boston). To avoid confusion, CJON was rebranded as "NTV", although as late as August 1978, the Newfoundland Herald's TV listings continued to refer to NTV as NBC, including listing the local newscasts under the title NBC News.

In 1972, CJON became one of the first television stations in Canada, if not the first, to broadcast around the clock every night (see "Overnight programming", below). In 1977, Stirling and Jamieson unwound their partnership, with Jamieson taking the AM radio stations, with CJON radio being renamed CJYQ. In later years, many of the AM stations were eventually sold, and in several cases shut down. Stirling kept NTV and the newly launched station CHOZ-FM. 1983 saw CJON and CHOZ's operations move to their present building on Logy Bay Road, with a new transmitter on the South Side Hills.

== Programming ==
=== 1988 to 2002 ===
Until the fall of 1992, CTV programming made up a clear majority of NTV's schedule, although acquired programming from CanWest Global and others was present. However, from 1992 on, when CTV reduced its programming to 40 hours per week, NTV suddenly became much more reliant on other broadcasters, primarily CanWest (which owned the Canadian rights to many dominant programs of the era such as The Simpsons and Seinfeld), but also Baton Broadcasting and WIC. Instead of relying on any one group, it took what it considered the best programming from all the groups, even after the Baton/CTV merger strengthened the CTV schedule considerably.

During this period, and indeed well before, NTV consistently aired 4 1/2 hours of prime time programming each night, a great deal of them being American imports, from 8 p.m. to 12:30 a.m. NT (11 p.m. ET), as opposed to the North American norm of three hours. In fact, in 1995–96, first-run prime time programming began at 7:30 p.m. and ran until 12:30 a.m. Although the net result was less than the mandated 50% Canadian content between 6 p.m. and midnight, this was not deemed to violate Cancon regulations as CTV National News did not feed an 11 p.m. AT edition until 1998, although the practice was maintained without CRTC complaint until disaffiliation in 2002.

=== 2002 to present ===
For almost four decades, CJON had aired the base CTV schedule essentially for free since CTV paid it for the airtime. It then bought additional CTV programming for which it sold all advertising. However, in early 2002, CTV tried to make CJON pay for the base schedule as well, with no possibility of airtime payments. It also increased the fees for additional CTV programming beyond what CJON claimed it could pay. Newfoundland Broadcasting also did not want to continue to carry CTV's national advertising during these programs. Rather than agree to these terms, CJON disaffiliated from CTV at the end of the 2001–02 season.

As of fall 2002, NTV lost access to most CTV programming. However, the station maintained rights to CTV National News, Canada AM, and other CTV news programming free of charge, on the condition that it continue to provide coverage of Newfoundland and Labrador events for CTV and CTV News Channel. Additionally, it purchased rights to some CTV programming, such as Desperate Housewives, on an individual, per-season basis (Desperate Housewives aired on NTV in its first season but not afterward, and currently no CTV entertainment programming appears regularly on NTV; until 2006, some other CTV-owned properties such as the Academy Awards and the Juno Awards continued to air on NTV, but all have recently been dropped, although the Juno Awards have since reappeared on NTV as of 2009).

Most of NTV's entertainment programming since 2002 has been received via to a program supply agreement with the Global Television Network; for example, Survivor, Family Guy, and The Young and the Restless. NTV's last public comment on the arrangement, at a CRTC hearing in 2002, was to the effect that it would expire at the end of the 2005–2006 season. However, with the addition of new Global programs to the NTV schedule during the spring and summer of 2006, all indications are that the agreement has been extended.

Along with promos, unsold commercial time on NTV has historically been filled with varying break fillers, including short-form NTV News updates, public service announcements, and occasionally clips from music videos (which were previously billed as cross-promotion for its sister radio station CHOZ-FM).

=== Local programming ===
As with many local stations in North America, non-news local programming was common in the station's early days but had decreased significantly by the 1990s. Since 2002, perhaps given the recent ratings dominance of CTV over Global (NTV's chief programming supplier), NTV has attempted to distinguish itself further through additional local programming, mainly from independent local producers. It also airs repeats of programs from the NTV archives, most frequently the retrospective series A Little Good News (later renamed NTV.ca), news program Canada in View (on Mondays), and speeches from Geoff Stirling during Captain Atlantis Late Night (on Saturdays).

=== Overnight programming ===
NTV's overnight schedule (between 2 and 6 a.m.) generally consists of reruns of reality programming originally produced for cable, such as Property Brothers, Masters of Flip and Fire Masters. The overnight block then concludes with Scenes of Newfoundland, a full half-hour or hour dedicated to scenes of the province with traditional music from local artists playing in the background.

On Saturdays, the channel shows a two-hour block of freeform programming under the banner of Captain Atlantis Late Night. This block usually consists of speeches and interviews involving Stirling or longtime Newfoundland Premier Joey Smallwood, but has also included content such as American patriotic montages, recut Elvis Presley television specials, holiday movies and specials, and miscellanea. As of 2021, Captain Atlantis (named after an ancient alien astronaut character Stirling created; see also Captain Canada who exists in the same fictional universe) airs in the early Saturday graveyard slot, and on Saturday mornings.

== News operation ==
CJON presently broadcasts 15 hours, 30 minutes of locally produced newscasts each week (with three hours each weekday and 30 minutes on Sundays); the station does not broadcast any news programs on Saturdays.

It has frequently been promoted as "the award-winning NTV Evening Newshour", in reference to a RTNDA Canada "Best Newscast – Medium Market" award from 1998 (for a newscast aired in 1997), and several other awards for individual reports received since. Overall, CBNT has won more RTNDA and AJA awards over the same period, and is the most recent area station to have won an RTNDA Best Newscast award, winning in 2009.

Repackaged versions of the Newshour air at midnight and at 6 a.m. the following day. NTV Newsday, a live newscast that airs weekdays at noon, frequently also relies on content from the previous night's Newshour. NTV's newscasts are also seen on at least one television station in the United States—WZRA-CD (channel 48), an ethnic station in Tampa, Florida, has regularly carried NTV's newscasts as well as select CTV programming. In fact, NTV's website promotes the fact that NTV advertisers can reach Tampa viewers through WZRA, although the station's signal is only received well in northwestern parts of Tampa (WZRA is licensed to Oldsmar, Florida, a northwestern suburb of Tampa).

== Technical information ==
=== Subchannels ===
In a rarity for a Canadian television station, CJON's signal is multiplexed:

Subchannels of CJON-DT
Channel	Res.	Short name	Programming
21.1	1080i	NTV	Main CJON-DT programming
21.2	Audio only	OZFM	Simulcast of CHOZ-FM

=== Analog-to-digital conversion ===
In May 2011, CJON announced plans to broadcast in digital and in high definition. The analog transmitter serving the St. John's viewing area was shut off on the morning of July 11, 2011, in order to facilitate installation of the new digital HD transmitter. CJON began transmitting its digital signal on August 3, 2011, broadcasting on UHF channel 21. CJON has opted to use channel 21, its actual digital channel, as its virtual channel, instead of channel 6, its former analog channel.

=== Retransmitters ===
The station once operated a network of retransmitters across the province. These transmitters were all analog and never converted to digital. Beginning in the 1990s, transmitters in smaller communities were shut down or spun off to community-based groups. More transmitters were shut down from 2006 to 2013.

The station's transmitters in Swift Current (CJSC-TV channel 10), Glenwood (CHSG-TV channel 7), and St. Alban's (CJST-TV channel 13) were shut down as of December 31, 2006; transmitters in Bay Bulls (CJON-TV-4 channel 10) and Lawn (CJLN-TV channel 10) were shut down as of November 2011.

On November 30, 2012, transmitters at Red Rocks (CJRR-TV channel 11) and Stephenville (CJSV-TV channel 4) were shut down; the station cited the age of the towers and the costs of the upkeep. The station also announced that their transmitter network would eventually close down in the coming years, due to the high cost of upkeep. Deleted concurrently with CJRR and CJSV was the transmitter at Grand Bank (CJOX-TV-1 channel 2), which left the air in September 2012 following the failure of its transmitter; NTV also chose to close CJOX-1 instead of repairing it.

On July 31, 2013, the remaining over-the-air retransmitters of NTV in Corner Brook, Deer Lake, Norris Arm, Bonavista, Clarenville, Argentia, and Marystown were discontinued. Coupled with the closure of the CBC's analog repeater network in 2012, the St. John's area is the only part of the province that does not need a cable or satellite subscription for "over-the-air" TV. However, few Newfoundlanders lost access to NTV due to the high penetration of cable and satellite in the province.

List of some of CJON's former retransmitters

Station	City of licence	Channel	ERP	HAAT	Transmitter coordinates	Closed
CJON-TV-4	Bay Bulls	10 (VHF)	0.009 kW	NA	47°18′52″N 52°49′17″W	2011
CJCN-TV	Norris Arm	4 (VHF)	100 kW	182.5 m (599 ft)	49°4′14″N 55°16′42″W	2013
CJCV-TV	Clarenville	11 (VHF)	0.211 kW	112 m (367 ft)	48°10′12″N 53°58′26″W	2013
CJLN-TV	Lawn	10 (VHF)	0.009 kW	NA	46°57′30″N 55°32′19″W	2011
CJLW-TV	Deer Lake	8 (VHF)	2.5 kW	129 m (423 ft)	49°15′23″N 57°30′25″W	2013
CJMA-TV	Marystown	11 (VHF)	1.8 kW	237 m (778 ft)	47°8′31″N 55°8′51″W	2013
CJOM-TV	Argentia	3 (VHF)	14 kW	164 m (538 ft)	47°15′44″N 53°58′54″W	2013
CJOX-TV-1	Grand Bank	2 (VHF)	9.26 kW	117.3 m (385 ft)	47°5′17″N 55°46′19″W	2012
CJRR-TV	Red Rocks	11 (VHF)	0.805 kW	132 m (433 ft)	47°40′26″N 59°18′13″W	2012
CJSV-TV	Stephenville	4 (VHF)	8.34 kW	138.3 m (454 ft)	48°31′9″N 58°30′56″W	2012
CJWB-TV	Bonavista	10 (VHF)	17.6 kW	169 m (554 ft)	48°37′30″N 53°3′41″W	2013
CJWN-TV	Corner Brook	10 (VHF)	14.75 kW	88.5 m (290 ft)	48°56′55″N 57°58′17″W	2013

=== Internet ===
NTV streams all of its local newscasts live through its website, with no geographic restrictions. The live Internet feed previously carried some of the American syndicated programs; these were dropped in September 2018. It has never carried network programming on the online feed. During times when it is not carrying local news, the NTV online feed simulcasts sister station CHOZ-FM, accompanied by webcam shots overlooking St. John's. In 2022, CJON launched the NTV+ app, which carries programming from NTV as well as CHOZ-FM.

== See also ==
- Captain Canada (comics)
- Waiting for Fidel
