= Sad Song of Yellow Skin =

- Directed by: Michael Rubbo
- Written by: Michael Rubbo
- Produced by: Tom Daly
- Narrated by: Michael Rubbo
- Cinematography: Martin Duckworth; Pierre Letarte
- Edited by: Torben Schioler; Michael Rubbo
- Production company: National Film Board of Canada
- Distributed by: Canadian Broadcasting Corporation / CBC Television
- Release date: 1970
- Running time: 58 min.
- Country: Canada
- Language: English
- Budget: $72,484 (CAD)

Sad Song of Yellow Skin is a 1970 direct cinema-style documentary, produced by the National Film Board of Canada, on the effects of the Vietnam War on street children in Saigon.

== Production ==
Michael Rubbo had originally gone to Vietnam with the goal of making a documentary about the work of Foster Parents Plan with Vietnamese war orphans. Once there, when confronted with the enormity of what was taking place, he felt a film about this humanitarian operation was missing the real story. Rubbo's NFB producer, Tom Daly, supported him in his efforts to rethink the film.

Rubbo met the film's through Dick Hughes, a young American who offered his apartment as a safe haven for street kids. Hughes was part of a group of American student journalists who adopted a New Journalism approach to covering the war—a highly personal and involved approach that would influence Rubbo's style in making this film. This group of young journalists included John Steinbeck IV.

Rubbo recorded his own subjective observations in a diary and developed the idea for what would be the first of his self-reflexive documentaries with the NFB. In Sad Song of Yellow Skin, Rubbo often comments on his own actions within the film, expressing his doubts, fears and concerns, reminding the viewer they are watching a film and not an objective representation of reality.

The film had a budget of $72,484.

== Awards ==
- 24th British Academy Film Awards, London: BAFTA Award for Best Documentary, 1971
- Melbourne International Film Festival, Melbourne: Silver Boomerang, Best Film, 1971
- HEMISFILM, San Antonio TX: Best Film, 1971
- Festival of World Television, Los Angeles: Best Documentary, 1971
- American Film and Video Festival, New York: Blue Ribbon
- American Film and Video Festival, New York: Emily Award
- 22nd Canadian Film Awards: Toronto: Special Award for Reportage, 1970
- Atlanta Film Festival: Gold Medal, Special Jury Award, 1971

== Works cited ==
- Evans, Gary (1991). In the National Interest: A Chronicle of the National Film Board of Canada from 1949 to 1989. University of Toronto Press. ISBN 0802027849.
