= 2012 Summer Paralympics opening ceremony =

- Part of 2012 Summer Paralympics
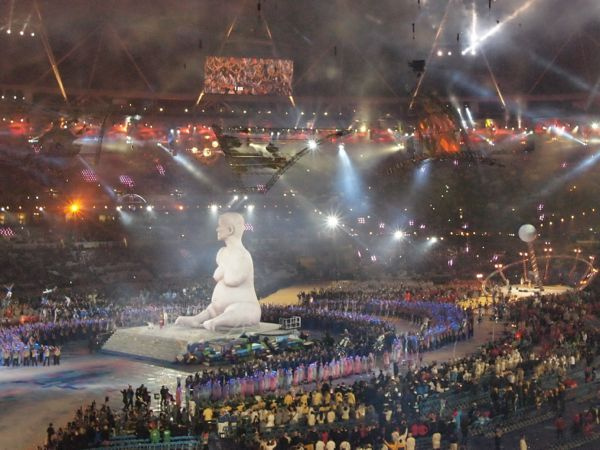
- Date: 20:30, 29 August 2012 (+01:00)
- Venue: Olympic Stadium
- Location: London, United Kingdom; 51°32′19″N 0°01′00″W
- Also known as: Enlightenment
- Filmed by: Olympic Broadcasting Services (OBS)

The 2012 Summer Paralympics opening ceremony was held on 29 August 2012, starting at 20:30 BST and marking the official opening of the 2012 Summer Paralympics in London, England. The show, named Enlightenment, had Jenny Sealey and Bradley Hemmings as its artistic directors, leading a team that included Jon Bausor as set designer and Moritz Junge as costume designer. Queen Elizabeth II officially opened the Games. The ceremony was performed in the Olympic Stadium in London in front of a capacity audience of 80,000 people.

== Production ==
Students from local schools who are part of the get set network were part of the under-16 cast. These include Millfields Community School in Hackney, Eastlea Community School in Newham and Trinity School in Barking and Dagenham. A total of 110 days of rehearsals took place in Dagenham. The ceremony had an adult volunteer cast of over 3,000 people, along with over 100 children and over 100 professional performers. Among the professional performers were 73 deaf and disabled performers and among the volunteers were 68 people with disabilities. In the build-up to the opening ceremony, an eight-week circus skills training programme took place at The Circus Space in Hoxton, London, and was run by 50 specialist performers. Participants included professional artists and many people who were new to the arts scene, such as soldiers undergoing rehabilitation and non-competing disabled athletes. The programme was funded by Arts Council England, and was part of the Enlightenment section, performing on a 35-metre high platform above the stadium floor.

Stephen Daldry commenting on the ceremonies of London 2012 noted that "if Danny Boyle's [Olympics opening ceremony] was very much about two revolutions and popular culture and Kim Gavin's [Olympics closing ceremony] was very much about a symphony of British music, then what you will get from Jenny and Bradley is something very different." Daldry also stated that "there will be an extraordinary number of disabled performers in the cast." Sealey introduced Stephen Hawking, the "most famous disabled person alive", as a narrator focusing on science and culture of the 18th century. As with the 2012 Olympics opening ceremony, The Tempest featured heavily and the character Miranda from the story starred in the ceremony, being the eyes for the audience. Sealey said that the character "sees everybody but she doesn't judge. That is fundamental to our personal and political ethos," adding that it is "fundamental, [that] you look without judging. It's about removing those attitudinal barriers." Sealey said that it was pure coincidence that she and Hemmings had chosen a line from the same play that was used by Boyle in the opening ceremony of the Olympics. "When we found out Danny Boyle was going to reference Shakespeare's The Tempest we burst out laughing." Hemming, when comparing the Games to the Large Hadron Collider, said that the LHC "transforms our perception of our place in the universe in the same way that the Paralympics transforms our perception of what's possible," while Sebastian Coe said that the ceremony would be a "great showcase of the skills and excellence of disabled artists."

Sealey and Hemming were determined to "pay tribute to the contributions that science has made to the able bodied and impaired alike." The pair approached Hawking in late 2011, who was adamant that he would write his own part. Hawking commented on his role that "to use this stage to show the world that regardless of differences between individuals, there is something that everyone is good at, is very important." Sealey and Hemming worked closely with Hawking to develop a series of messages for the ceremony and spent time with him in Cambridge; Hemming said Hawking had been "incredibly gratified with him giving his time." Sealey said that although the ceremony has Hawking and Ian McKellen narrating, "what we all need to remember: don't just look down at your feet, look at the stars, be curious."

== Officials and Guests ==
The programme was attended by the Queen's grandson Prince William and the Duchess of Cambridge, David Cameron, the Prime Minister, with his wife Samantha Cameron and by the Mayor of London Boris Johnson.

Foreign dignitaries included :

- Secretary General of the United Nations Ban Ki-moon
- (European Union) President of the European Commission Jose Manuel Barroso
- Vice President of United States Joe Biden
- President of France Francois Hollande
- President of Germany Joachim Gauck
- President of Italy Giorgio Napolitano
- Prime Minister of Russia Dmitry Medvedev
- Prince of Monaco Albert II
- Grand Duke Henri of Luxembourg

== Proceedings ==
Before the ceremony at 20:12 local time a flypast by Aerobility took place. Aerobility are a British charity that trains disabled people to become pilots.

=== Miranda ===
"We live in a universe governed by rational laws that we can discover and understand. Look up at the stars, and not down at your feet. Try to make sense of what you see, and wonder about what makes the universe exist. Be curious."

— Stephen Hawking encouraging Miranda to be curious

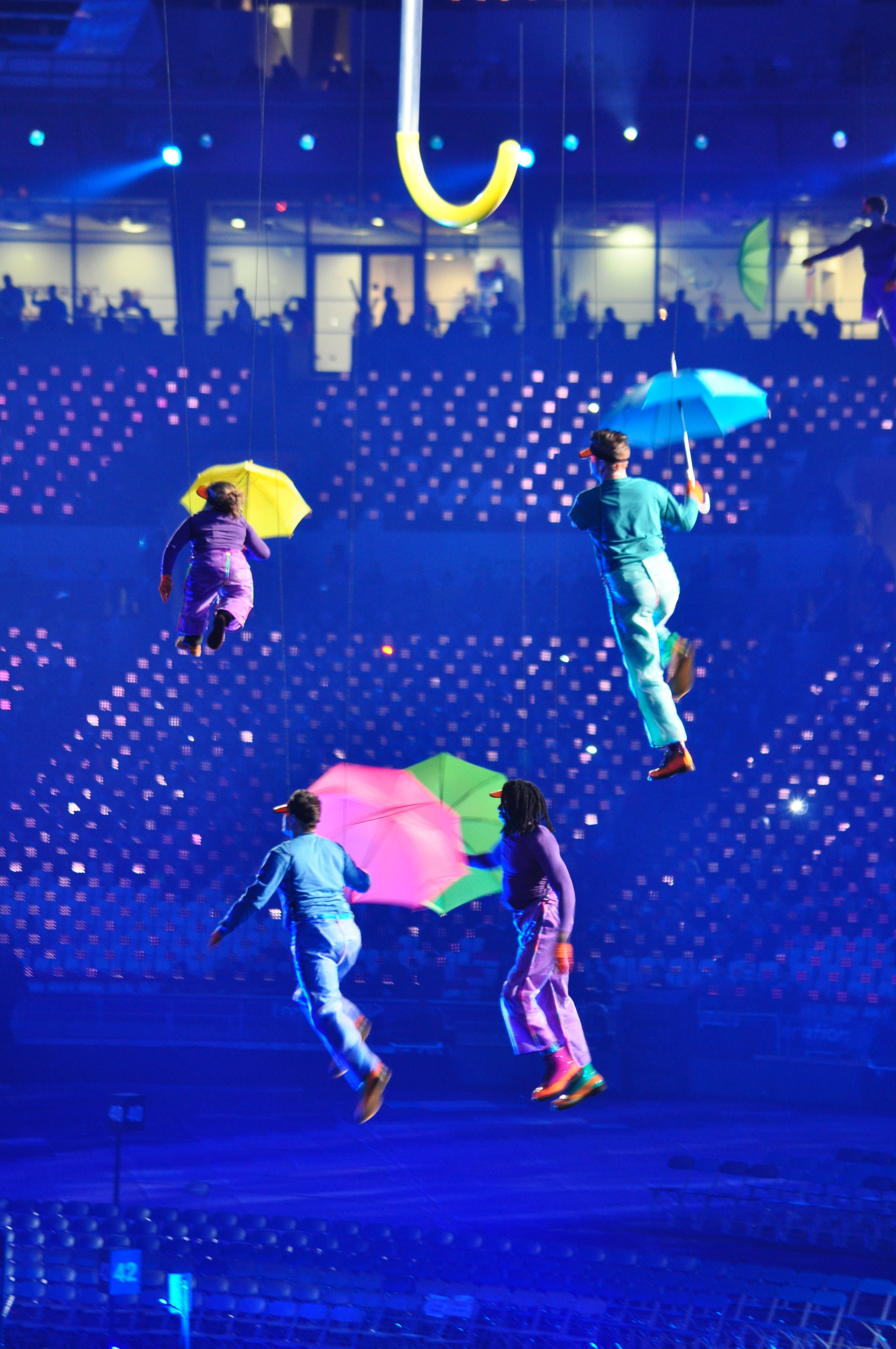
Performers holding umbrellas fly around the stadium.

The Ceremony started with a countdown featuring shots of the universe starting from Earth working outwards. Stephen Hawking then appeared on the Moon stage and talked about science and reason, which was followed with the "big bang" taking place with people holding umbrellas. Fireworks were released as the audience was cast into deepest space. The audience was brought back to modern day London as Flawless performed a street-dance on the moon stage to Rihanna's "Umbrella", as several people holding coloured umbrellas floated around the stadium. One of the performers floating around the stadium was introduced as Miranda, portrayed by Nicola Miles-Wildin. The stadium was also greeted by Prospero (Ian McKellen). Prospero encouraged Miranda to go out and be our eyes on our journey of discovery in science. Hawking meanwhile encouraged Miranda to be curious while the cast created an eye symbolising Miranda's. Three vehicles with motifs from the history of science appeared followed by a performance of "Principia" by Errollyn Wallen which featured lyrics about science.

=== Majesty ===
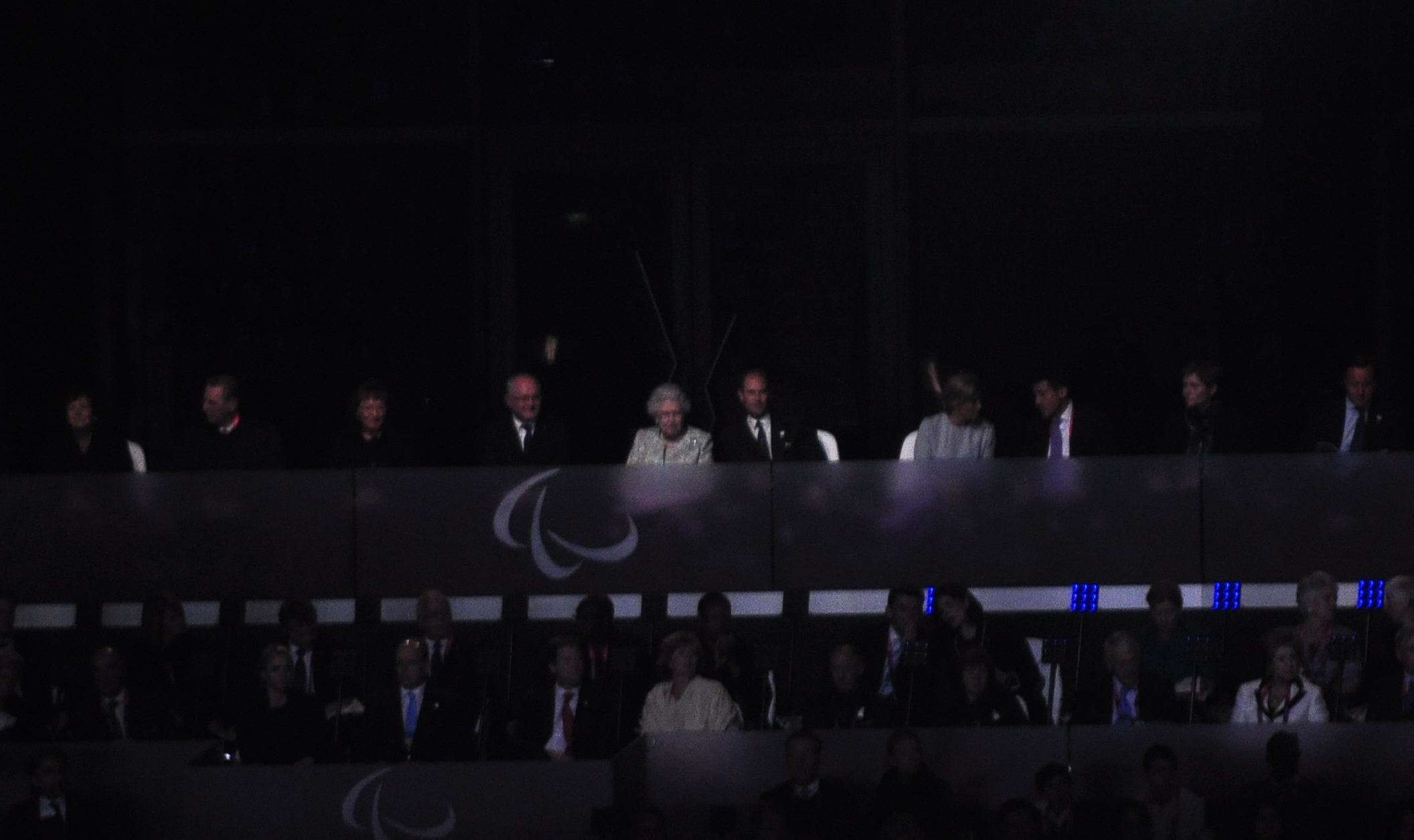
The Queen (centre right) and Sir Philip Craven (centre left) arrive.

Queen Elizabeth II and Sir Philip Craven entered the stadium, after they were seated the Union Flag was raised and the national anthem of the United Kingdom was played. Corporal of the Horse Brophy – The Household Cavalry Mounted Division; Lance Corporal Steane – Nijmegen Company, Grenadier Guards; Warrant Officer Vaughan – RM Poole; Chief Petty Officer Appleton – HMS Raleigh; Leading Hand Campbell – HMS Coniston; Warrant Officer Grundy – RAF Cranwell; Sergeant Hyde – RAF Valley; Lance Corporal O'Mahoney – The Household Cavalry Mounted Division; marched the flag to the flag pole under the leadership of Flight Lieutenant Marsden – RAF Halton. As they marched William Walton's "A Wartime Sketchbook" was heard. The flag was raised to the national anthem by Able Seaman Patel – HMS King Alfred; Corporal Penman – RAF Lossiemouth; Lance Corporal Peelo as a 430 strong choir performed the song and 12 people signed the song. Whilst the umbrellas in the centre of the stadium formed a representation of the flag.

=== Spirit in Motion ===
The Parade of Athletes then began. Teams entered in alphabetical order, according to the English language translation of their names. In accordance with tradition, the host country, Great Britain, marched into the stadium last. 165 countries were to participate in the Paralympics. However, neither Botswana nor Malawi, who were due to participate for the first time, sent their delegations. During the parade, a mix of global music was played by local DJs DJ Walde, DJ Excalibah, and Goldierocks.

After the parade Denise Leigh, who is blind and was the winner of Channel 4's reality competition show Operatunity, sung Wallen's new piece "Spirit in Motion." Leigh was joined by deaf actress Deepa Shastri who signed the lyrics.

=== Homecoming ===
London Organising Committee of the Olympic and Paralympic Games chairman Sebastian Coe and President of the International Paralympic Committee Sir Philip Craven addressed the audience. Coe welcomed the Paralympic Games home before telling the story of the precursor to the Paralympic Games in 1948. Coe said the Paralympic movement shows "what sport is all about, sport is about what you can do, what you can achieve, the limits you can reach, the barriers you can break, sport shows what is possible, sport refuses to take no for an answer; and everything that sport stands for we are going to see right here right now and in these Paralympic Games." Coe said that his team were determined to raise the bar for the Olympics and Paralympics, and that he wanted London 2012 to be an advance for the Paralympic movement and a landmark for disability worldwide and for the progress of mankind. Coe, talking to the athletes, stated that "they will hear us [the crowd]" and added that "the enthusiasm for these Games is extraordinary. The crowds will be unprecedented. These will be Games to remember." Coe told the world, "prepare to be inspired, prepare to be moved, prepare to be dazzled by the Paralympic Games of London 2012!"

Craven said that it was the start of the biggest Paralympic Games ever and the night was a celebration of the development human spirit and the Paralympic Games coming home and of dreams becoming reality. Craven said that "what would happen at the Games had the energy to change each and every one of us." Craven then paid tribute to Sir Ludwig Guttmann and the people who helped him in 1948 to create the first sparks of the Paralympic movement. Craven continued by paying tribute to the people who made London 2012 possible, particularly the Games Makers and the people of London, and noted that Coe's team exceeded everyone's wildest dreams with the Olympics. Craven stated that he was delighted to be joined by the President of the International Olympic Committee Jacques Rogge and his wife Anne in the stadium. Craven said that Britain had an insatiable appetite for sport and that London 2012 had done a tremendous job in making everyone feel like it was their Games, and spoke of his pride of the mascot, Mandeville, being hand-crafted by a retired steel worker from his home town of Bolton. Craven then thanked all the international sport federations who held qualifying competitions and welcomed a record 164 National Paralympic committees. Craven stated that these were the best prepared athletes ever and welcomed them to London. To the athletes, Craven stated that they "have some of the finest sporting stages upon which to perform", every step of the way cheered on by the "most passionate sport fans you will ever have seen or heard." Continuing, he said that they would inspire many generations to come and their stories and performances will challenge people to think about themselves and others. Craven then stated that the athletes are all catalysts for change and role models for an inclusive society. Craven then asked the athletes to "abide by the rules and show the world why you are all proud Paralympians." He added that they were there to continue the story that Guttmann started and stated that they had the "ability to win medals and change the world". Craven wished the athletes the very best of luck and reminded them to have fun. Craven "with honour and great pleasure" asked Queen Elizabeth II to officially open the Games.

Once the Games were declared open, the Paralympic flag was carried into the Stadium by eight members of the Great Britain Under 22 Wheelchair Basketball team: Billy Bridge, Harry Brown, Emmanuel Filson, James MacSorley, Philip Pratt, Richard Sargent, Gregg Warburton and Joseph Williams. This was hoisted into the air as the Anthem was played.

Swimmer Liz Johnson, Wheelchair rugby official Richard Allcroft, and David Hunter of the ParalympicsGB equestrian team took oaths on behalf of all the athletes, judges, and coaches, vowing to compete, judge, and coach according to the rules of their respective sport.

=== Brave New World ===
The giant umbrella in the centre of the stadium was lifted, revealing Miranda and Prospero underneath in a Library. The pair were stood on a giant book of The Universal Declaration of Human Rights and the umbrella became a lampshade. Elin Manahan Thomas then performed Handel's "Eternal Source of Light Divine" during which the lampshade divided into seven sections and six athletes; Robert Barrett (Athletics), Kay Forshaw (Wheelchair Tennis), Tanni Grey-Thompson (Athletics), Tony Griffin (Javelin), Ian Rose (Judo), and Marc Woods (Swimming) rose to the centre of the stadium. This was followed by Miranda reciting the "brave new world" speech from The Tempest.

=== Navigation ===
"There ought to be something very special about the boundary conditions of the universe, and what can be more special than that there is no boundary. And there should be no boundary to human endeavour."

— Hawking explaining that there are no boundaries in the universe

Miranda was sent on a voyage by Prospero in a boat created by an upturned umbrella. Whilst she is travelling, the books symbolise seagulls as the weather turns. Miranda was caught in a storm of ideas as words from The Universal Declaration of Human Rights appear on the pixel screen, as Ziya Azazi, a contemporary whirling dervish dancer, becomes the eye of the storm on top of the orrery. Birdy sang "Bird Gerhl" as the sway pole dancers signed the lyrics and David Toole did a contemporary dance. Toole and Miranda flew across the stadium, with Miranda arriving back on the book stage.

=== Gravity ===
A Mass of giant apples entered the stadium and circled the book stage, creating a maze. Performers juggled as a giant golden apple flew across the stadium. During the section Miranda learned of Isaac Newton and his work of gravity and of the Solar System, as apples floated and orbited the stage, Propero is at a telescope, and three performers created a giant Newton's cradle. Also in this section Miranda led the stadium in the big crunch.

=== Collision ===
"The greatest adventure is what lies ahead. Today and tomorrow are yet to be said. The chances, the changes are all yours to make. The mold of your life is in your hands to break."

— Miranda on her journey into history

Prospero at the telescope explained the journey that Miranda had been on. He concluded that Miranda was ready for the next step to change the world. The stadium was transported back to 2012 and became a large replica of the Large Hadron Collider; Stephen Hawking, reappearing, explained that the Collider can change our perceptions of the world just like the Games themselves.

=== Empowerment ===
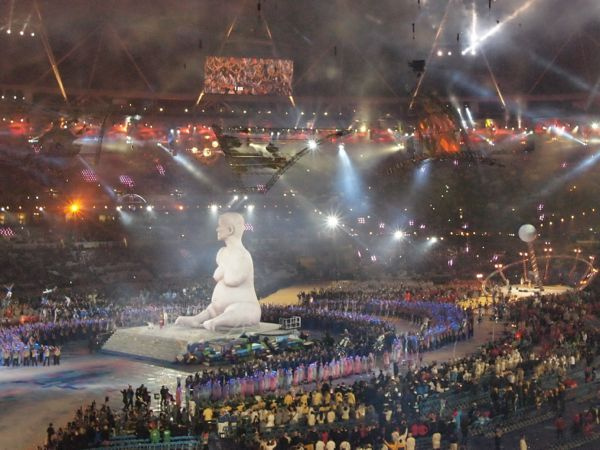
Alison Lapper Pregnant in the middle of the stadium as the cast form the agitos during "I Am What I Am".

"The Paralympic Games is about transforming our perception of the world. We are all different, there is no such thing as a standard or run-of-the-mill human being, but we share the same human spirit. What is important is that we have the ability to create. This creativity can take many forms, from physical achievement to theoretical physics. However difficult life may seem there is always something you can do, and succeed at.

"The Games provide an opportunity for athletes to excel, to stretch themselves and become outstanding in their field. So let us together celebrate excellence, friendship, and respect. Good luck to you all."

— Hawking putting the Games in the context of the ceremony

Orbital then performed "Where Is It Going?" as protesters with placards entered to call for equal rights. Ian Dury's "Spasticus Autisticus" was performed by Graeae Theatre Company, whilst Orbital continued to perform behind Hawking. Miranda and Propero protested as a giant version of Marc Quinn's statue Alison Lapper Pregnant arrived in the middle of the stadium. Miranda rose to break the glass as shattered pieces are seen on the pixels.

=== Enlightenment ===
A film showing the journey of the Paralympic torch to the stadium began the section. Hawking put the Paralympic Games into the wider context of society. Royal Marine Commando Joe Townsend, who hoped to compete in Rio (he went on to compete in paratriathlon), followed by zip wiring into the Olympic Stadium from the ArcelorMittal Orbit carrying the Paralympic torch. Fireworks signified his arrival as he handed it to Dave Clark, member of the 2012 blind 5-a-side football team. Clark then ran to the cauldron where he passed it to Margaret Maughan, Britain's first Gold medallist in the Paralympic Games, who lit the petals which rose to form the cauldron.

=== "I Am What I Am" ===
Beverley Knight, Lizzie Emeh and deaf performer Caroline Parker appeared on the Moon stage to close the ceremony with a performance of "I Am What I Am". A pyrotechnic display took place as the entire cast flooded the stadium to form the three agitos of the Paralympic logo. The cast and the audience joined in with the signing and signed the lyrics which were learnt pre-show.

== Broadcasting and reception ==
80,000 people watched the Ceremony in the stadium. Audience viewing figures in the United Kingdom showed that an average of 7.6 million, a 40% share, watched the ceremony.

The opening ceremony was met with positive reviews. Jim White of The Daily Telegraph described the ceremony as "three hours of noisy, colourful, bolshie brouhaha. Plus umbrellas." However, White also felt that it was also "a little jumbled in its rush to communicate its ideas, maybe; occasionally resembling a giant prog rock gig, for sure." White also praised the ceremony's use of "The Tempest" as an overlying theme, believing that Miranda's "O wonder" speech was "beautifully apt" in the context of what fans would expect to see during the Paralympics, and that her flight upwards into a glass ceiling was the most symbolic moment of the entire ceremony—since he believed that Paralympic athletes would also be "smashing ceilings" throughout the Games. Writing in the Independent Jerome Taylor notes that the ceremony was more structured and the music more classical than the Olympic equivalent "but it was still infused with simmering political radicalism and social commentary." Taylor also states that the Ceremony was a celebration of humankind overcoming the impossible. While Charles Perrin in the Daily Express states that after the Olympics the opening ceremony of the Paralympics "won the hearts and minds of the public with a truly memorable show." Perrin adds that "there was a palpable sense of awe and wonder attached to the ceremony, especially when the athletes parade began stadium."

Charlotte Higgins of The Guardian also enjoyed the ceremony, noting that despite the lack of "gleeful anarchy" and lower budget in comparison to its Olympic equivalent, noting that the theme of enlightenment representing both "a hoped-for lifting of prejudice against disabled people; and the 18th-century onrush of scientific knowledge and quest for the rights of man", along with its embodiment through the use of Stephen Hawking were "brilliant strokes" by the directors. In conclusion, Higgins remarked that concluding that "the ceremony seemed to suggest, the only barrier to disabled people's fulfilling their potential was one of perception." Fellow Guardian writer Owen Gibson was also positive towards the opening ceremony, stated that the creators had finally "found" dramatic use for the Olympic Park's Orbit sculpture." Overall Gibson found the ceremony to be a 'thought-provoking, expectation-defying, moving and occasionally challenging romp.' Concluding "Just as the title of Boyle's Isles of Wonder spectacular came to sum up the giddy excitement of London's Olympics, so organisers hope that Enlightenment will come to describe the effect of the Paralympics that over the next 10 days will conclude a bounteous sporting summer." Francis Ryan writing for the same paper notes that "it was a seismic beginning for an opening ceremony that seemed smaller than its Olympic counterpart one month ago. It seemed lower key, perhaps, with less fanfare and more poignancy than brash spectacle. But by midnight, wonder was literally flying through the air." Ryan states that the ceremony "was beauty, a thrust of anger, and a spotlight on athletes too often in the shade." Ryan notes that the ceremony was thoughtful and combined emotional and complex ideas with the mystical. Concluding Ryan notes that Miranda smashing the ceiling was fiction but "in a sense in the real world had made a crack." Whilst Richard Williams proclaimed that the nation suffered a petite mort at the end of the Olympics took its opportunity to come back to life.

Anthony Faiola, writing for The Washington Post noted that "the expensive theatrics and brilliant pyrotechnics Wednesday underscored just how far the event has come," from the Games beginning in 1948. He also notes that the ceremony was far more sober than its Olympic counterpart but could be just as esoteric. Lawrence Downes in The New York Times noted that the ceremony was truly cosmic. Gary Kingston writing in the Vancouver Sun noted that the ceremony was equally infused with "whimsy and wonder." He further stated that there was playful use of the umbrella during the ceremony quintessential of British objects. Kingston also comments that the appearance of Toole and the aerial ballet demonstrated that physical limitations do not limit human potential.

Channel 4, the official broadcaster of the Paralympics in the U.K., faced criticism throughout the opening ceremony for its coverage; viewers complained about the quality of Jon Snow's commentary; such as bringing up too many facts pertaining to war during the parade of nations. Channel 4 responded by saying that they had taken fewer breaks than normal for a primetime programme, and were pleased at Snow was part of the team.

== Music ==
- Umbrella (Seamus Haji & Paul Emanuel Remix) was the first song performed during the ceremony.
- DJ Walde, DJ Excalibah and Goldierocks – Global Music Mash-Up.
- Principia, a specially composed piece by Greenwich-based composer Errollyn Wallen, inspired by Sir Isaac Newton's Principia Mathematica, and performed by six-London based choirs, including the London Gay Men's Chorus and the Lewisham Choral Society.
- Benjamin Britten's 1951 Leeds Festival arrangement of the national anthem, God Save the Queen.
- Spirit in Motion: a newly commissioned song by Errollyn Wallen and sung by Denise Leigh, the blind soprano who won Channel 4's Operatunity.
- An abridged version of Jupiter, from The Planets suite by Gustav Holst was performed during the entry of the Paralympic flag, carried by eight members of the British under-22 wheelchair basketball team.
- After eight members of the British Armed Forces attached the Paralympic flag to a flagpole, the Paralympic hymn was performed during the hoisting of the flag.
- Handel's Eternal Light of Source Divine sung by Welsh soprano Elin Manahan Thomas and accompanied by Philip Cobb, principal trumpet of the London Symphony Orchestra.
- Bird Gerhl by Antony Hegarty, sung by Birdy.
- Koch and Gilpin – Gravity, Masque (new commissions)
- A medley of Where Is It Going? written by Orbital and Spasticus Autisticus written by Ian Dury, a singer-songwriter disabled by polio. Performed by Orbital and the Graeae Theatre Company with John Kelly reprising the Ian Dury performance. The version featured a sample of Professor Stephen Hawking's voice. Hawking joined the band on stage during the performance and wore their trademark torch glasses.
- I Am What I Am written by Jerry Herman sung by Beverley Knight and chorus, who encouraged the audience to join in verbally and with sign language.

== See also ==
- 2012 Summer Olympics opening ceremony
- 2012 Summer Olympics closing ceremony
- 2012 Summer Paralympics closing ceremony
