= Michael Rubbo =

Australian film director (born 1938)

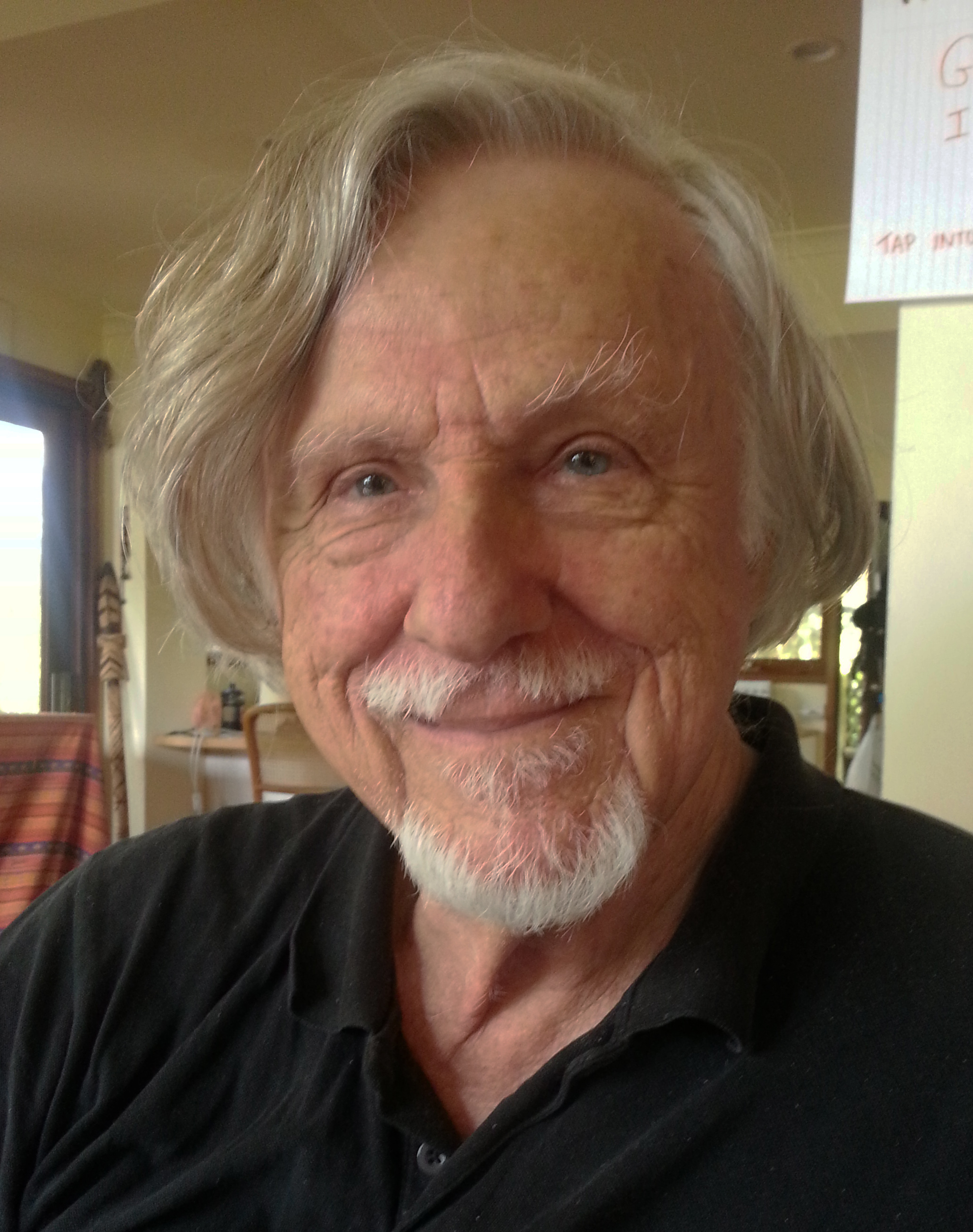
- Rubbo in October, 2017
- Born: Michael Dattilo Rubbo; 31 December 1938 (age 87); Melbourne, Victoria, Australia
- Education: Scotch College; Sydney University; Stanford University
- Occupations: Director; writer; producer
- Spouse: Katerina Rubbo
- Children: 2
- Awards: See below

Michael Dattilo Rubbo (born 31 December 1938) is an Australian documentarian/filmmaker.

== Early life ==
Rubbo, film maker and artist, was born in Melbourne, the son of Australian microbiologist Sydney Dattilo Rubbo, and artist Ellen Rubbo with whom he had his first exhibition at The Argus Gallery. He is the grandson of the painter Antonio Dattilo Rubbo and is one of four children. He attended the private Scotch College, and studied anthropology at Sydney University. He earned a Fulbright scholarship to study film at Stanford University, California; in 1965, he graduated with a Master's degree in Communication Arts.

== Career ==
Rubbo approached the National Film Board of Canada about an internship, but they were so impressed by his thesis film, The True Source of Knowledge, they hired him to make films, initially for children. He spent the next 20 years there, as a director, writer, editor and/or producer, mainly of serious films. At the time, the NFB was encouraging an objective approach to non-fiction film, including the use of voice-of-God narration, but Rubbo became an early pioneer in the field of metafilm, creating subjective, highly personal films that were more like personal journals than objective records of reality. His best-known NFB films are Sad Song of Yellow Skin (1972), Waiting for Fidel (1973), Wet Earth and Warm People, and Margaret Atwood: Once in August (1984).

In between films, Rubbo taught at Australia's National Film School, and was a visiting lecturer at New York University, UCLA, Stanford University, the University of Florida, Harvard University and the Australian Film, Television and Radio School. His work has influenced numerous filmmakers, notably Michael Moore, Nick Broomfield, Louis Theroux, Tina DiFeliciantonio and Karen Goodman.

In 1990, he returned to Australia to take the position of Head of Documentaries at the Australian Broadcasting Corporation.

Rubbo's films have won numerous awards. Many have been shown on TV and are in the collections of the Museum of Modern Art (MOMA) and film schools around the world. His films have been screened at many festivals including the Sydney Film Festival.

Rubbo has also directed and written four children's feature films including The Peanut Butter Solution (1985), Tommy Tricker and the Stamp Traveller (1988), The Return of Tommy Tricker (1994), and the Daytime Emmy award-winning film Vincent and Me (1990).

In 2017, he published the book Travels with My Art.

== Personal life ==
Rubbo and his wife Katerina, a Russian interpreter, teacher and artist, live in Avoca Beach, New South Wales. Rubbo has two grown children, Nicolas Rubbo (living in Canada) and Ellen Rubbo living in Australia.

In 2013, the BBC named the Avoca Beach Theatre as one of the 10 most beautiful cinemas in the world. Rubbo was prominent in the campaign to stop plans to redevelop the theatre. Rubbo is also a prominent advocate for the widespread use of bicycles.

== Filmography ==
- The True Source of Knowledge - documentary short, Stanford University 1965 - director
- The Long Haul Men - documentary short 1966 - director
- Sir! Sir! - documentary short, National Film Board of Canada 1968 - director
- Mrs. Ryan’s Drama Class - documentary short, National Film Board of Canada 1969 - director
- Sad Song of Yellow Skin - documentary, National Film Board of Canada/PBS 1970 - director, writer, editor
- Solomon’s Housing - documentary, National Film Board of Canada 1970 - director
- Wet Earth and Warm People - documentary, National Film Board of Canada 1971 - director, writer, editor
- Persistent and Finagling - documentary, National Film Board of Canada 1971 - director, writer, editor
- OK…Camera - documentary short, National Film Board of Canada 1972 - director
- The Streets of Saigon - documentary short, National Film Board of Canada 1973 - director, writer, editor
- The Man Who Couldn’t Stop - documentary, National Film Board of Canada 1973 - director, writer, editor
- Bate's Car: Sweet as a Nut - documentary short, Tony Ianzelo, National Film Board of Canada 1974 - producer
- Waiting for Fidel - documentary, National Film Board of Canada 1974 - director, writer, editor, co-producer with Tom Daly
- I Am an Old Tree - documentary, National Film Board of Canada 1975 - director, writer, editor, co-producer with Tom Daly
- Log House - documentary short National Film Board of Canada 1976 - director, with Andreas Poulsson
- The Walls Come Tumbling Down - documentary short, National Film Board of Canada 1976 - director (with Pierre Lasry & William Weintraub), writer, editor
- I Hate to Lose - documentary National Film Board of Canada 1977 - director, writer, editor
- Solzhenitsyn’s Children…Are Making a Lot of Noise in Paris - documentary, National Film Board of Canada 1979 - director, writer, editor
- Yes or No, Jean-Guy Moreau - documentary, National Film Board of Canada 1979 - director, writer
- Daisy: The Story of a Facelift - documentary, National Film Board of Canada 1982 - director, writer, editor, co-producer with Kate Jansen
- Not Far from Bolgatanga - documentary short, National Film Board of Canada 1982 - writer, editor, co-producer and co-director with Barrie Howells
- Margaret Atwood: Once in August - documentary, National Film Board of Canada 1984 - director, writer, editor, co-producer with Barrie Howells
- The Peanut Butter Solution - feature, Les Productions La Fête/Telefilm Canada 1985 - director, writer, producer
- Tommy Tricker and the Stamp Traveller - feature, Les Productions La Fête/Telefilm Canada 1988 - director, writer
- Vincent and Me aka Vincent et Moi - feature, Les Productions La Fête/Telefilm Canada 1990 - director, writer
- The Return of Tommy Tricker - feature, Les Productions La Fête/Telefilm Canada 1994 - director, writer
- Uni - documentary series, Simon Target, Australian Broadcasting Corporation 1997 - producer
- Race Around the World - documentary series, Australian Broadcasting Corporation 1997 - executive producer
- King’s School - documentary series, Simon Target, Australian Broadcasting Corporation 1998 - producer
- The Little Box That Sings - documentary, Australian Broadcasting Corporation 1999 - director, writer, producer
- Much Ado About Something - documentary, PBS/Australian Broadcasting Corporation 2001 - director, writer, producer
- All About Olive - documentary, The Helpful Eye 2004 - director
- A Hard Rain - documentary, David Bradbury, Frontline Films 2007 - writer
- Michael Rubbo's Documentary Journey - instructive series, Michael Rubbo, Ellen Rubbo 2020

== Awards ==
Mrs. Ryan's Drama Class 1969 (director)

- Conference on Children, Washington DC: Certificate of Merit, 1970

Sad Song of Yellow Skin (1970)

- 24th British Academy Film Awards, London: BAFTA Award for Best Documentary, 1971
- Melbourne International Film Festival, Melbourne: Silver Boomerang, Best Film, 1971
- HEMISFILM, San Antonio TX: Best Film, 1971
- Festival of World Television, Los Angeles: Best Documentary, 1971
- American Film and Video Festival, New York: Blue Ribbon Award, 1971
- American Film and Video Festival, New York: Emily Award, 1971
- 22nd Canadian Film Awards: Special Award for Reportage, 1970
- Atlanta Film Festival: Gold Medal, Special Jury Award, 1971

Wet Earth and Warm People (1971)

- Golden Gate International Film Festival, San Francisco: Honourable Mention, Sociological Studies of Specific Groups or Lifestyles in a Society, 1972
- Atlanta Film Festival, Atlanta: Bronze Medal, Feature, 1972
- Melbourne International Film Festival, Melbourne: Diploma of Merit, 1972

The Man Who Can’t Stop (1973)

- Chicago International Film Festival, Chicago: Certificate of Merit, 1974

Waiting for Fidel (1974)

- American Film and Video Festival, New York: Red Ribbon, World Concerns, 1976

Bate’s Car: Sweet as a Nut (1974)

- Biofest, Novi Sad, Yugoslavia: Award of Merit, 1976

The Walls Come Tumbling Down (1976)

- American Film and Video Festival, New York: Blue Ribbon Award, Citizen Action, 1978

Where Have All the Maoists Gone? (1978)

- International Filmfestival Mannheim-Heidelberg, Mannheim, Germany: Interfilm Award, 1978

Solzhenitsyn’s Children…Are Making a Lot of Noise in Paris (1979)

- International Filmfestival Mannheim-Heidelberg, Mannheim, Germany: International Evangelical Award, 1979

Daisy: The Story of a Facelift (1982)

- Melbourne International Film Festival, Melbourne: Diploma of Merit, 1983
- Uppsala International Short Film Festival, Uppsala, Sweden: Best Documentary Film, 1984
- American Film and Video Festival, New York: Blue Ribbon Award, Mental Health/Health/Guidance, 1984

The Peanut Butter Solution (1985)

- Giffoni Film Festival, Giffoni Valle Piana, Italy: Gold Medal, 1986
- Laon International Film Festival for Young People, Laon, France: Public's Choice Award, 1986

Vincent and Me 1990

- Daytime Emmy Awards, New York: Outstanding Children's Special, 1991
- Wisconsin International Children's Film Festival, Milwaukee: WisKid Award, Full-Length Feature, 1991
