= Captain Canada =

Captain Canada may refer to:

== Fictional characters ==
- Captain Canada (character), a comic book character created by broadcaster Geoff Stirling

== Nicknames ==
- Any athlete who is the captain of a Canadian national team.
- A member of the Royal Canadian Mounted Police
- Dwayne De Rosario, footballer and former captain of Toronto FC
- Doug Ford, Canadian politician and businessman involved in the 2025 U.S.–Canada–Mexico trade war
- Ian Millar, Canadian equestrian athlete
- Steve Nash, Canadian basketball player
- Michael Saunders, Canadian baseball player
- Ryan Smyth, Canadian hockey player
- Milos Raonic, Canadian tennis player and 2016 Wimbledon finalist
- Brian Tobin, Canadian politician and businessman involved in the 1995 Turbot War and 1995 Quebec referendum
- Mark Carney, Incumbent Prime Minister of Canada

== See also ==
- Captain Canuck
- Johnny Canuck
