= Operatunity Oz =

Operatunity Oz was a 2006 talent search, and accompanying four-part television documentary by Simon Target, in which Opera Australia conducted a nationwide quest to find someone without professional opera experience, who could be coached to sing in a staged opera – Verdi's Rigoletto in the event – at the Sydney Opera House in the company of professional performers, as part of Opera Australia's regular season. It was modelled on the earlier British Operatunity (2003).

== Production ==
The panel of judges was led by conductor Richard Gill, and included opera director Elke Neidhardt, world-renowned soprano Yvonne Kenny, and soprano Antoinette Halloran. An album of performances by contestants, Operatunity Oz, was recorded in May and June at the Eugene Goossens Hall of the Australian Broadcasting Corporation's Ultimo Centre in Sydney.

The documentary aired on ABC TV weekly during October 2006.

== Winners ==
The winner, bass vocalist, David Parkin, took the role of Sparafucile in a performance of Rigoletto on 24 October 2006. Two other finalists, soprano Emily Burke and tenor Roy Best, impressed the judges sufficiently to be offered places in the same opera, performing the roles of Gilda and the Duke of Mantua respectively in the final act.

== Follow up ==
A follow-up program, Operatunity Oz Revisited, aired on 2 December 2007; in it, the judges reflected on the experience and updates were provided on the winners and some of the more memorable finalists. The ABC issued a DVD version of the documentary.

Parkin continued as a senior consultant for his firm, he also took up "vocal and language coaching with Sharolyn Kimmorley, Glenn Winslade, David Harper and Anna Connolly." He performed with Melbourne Symphony Orchestra at a Verdi Gala and later took "the roles of The Commendatore and Masetto in Don Giovanni for Opera Australia."

Burke became an Australia Day ambassador in 2008, she studied "voice under Yvonne Kenny and Rosamund Illing. Later [that] year, she [travelled] to Italy to attend a masterclass conducted by internationally renowned soprano, Mirella Freni." Best performed at the National Multicultural Festival Finale – Opera by the Lake in February 2007.
