= Avoca Beach Theatre =

Movie theater in Avoca Beach, New South Wales

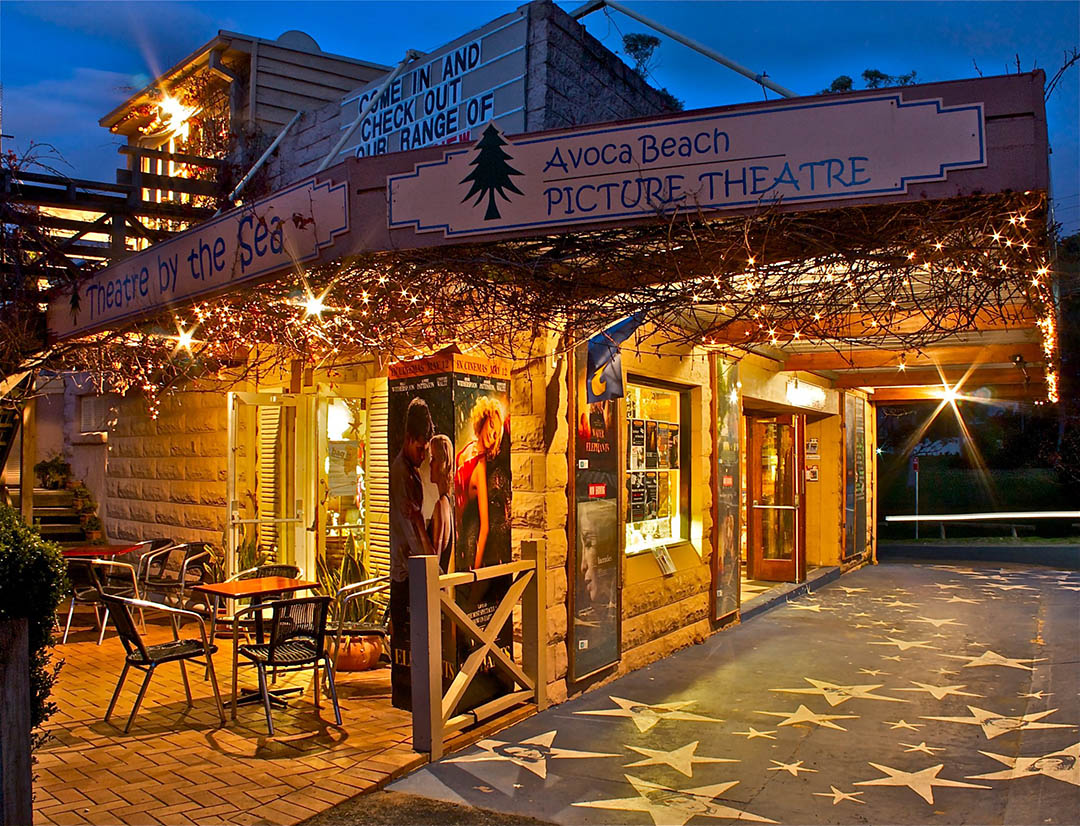
- Water for Elephants at Avoca Beach Theatre
- Interactive map of Avoca Beach Theatre
- Former names: Avoca Beach Picture Theatre
- Address: 69 Avoca Drive
- Location: Avoca Beach, New South Wales, 2251; Australia
- Coordinates: 33.4715918°S 151.4364167°E
- Owner: Norman and Beth Hunter
- Capacity: 280
- Type: Movie theatre

Construction
- Built: 1951
- Opened: 1948 (Outdoor)
- Renovated: 1974, 1990s, 2006, 2023

Website
- www.avocabeachtheatre.com.au

The Avoca Beach Theatre is an historic movie theatre located in Avoca Beach, New South Wales. First established as an outdoor cinema in the late 1940s, it was formally opened in late 1951. The theatre offers a range of events from film screenings to live music and comedy performances.

The BBC listed it as one of the 10 most beautiful cinemas in the world.

== History ==
=== Early Days ===
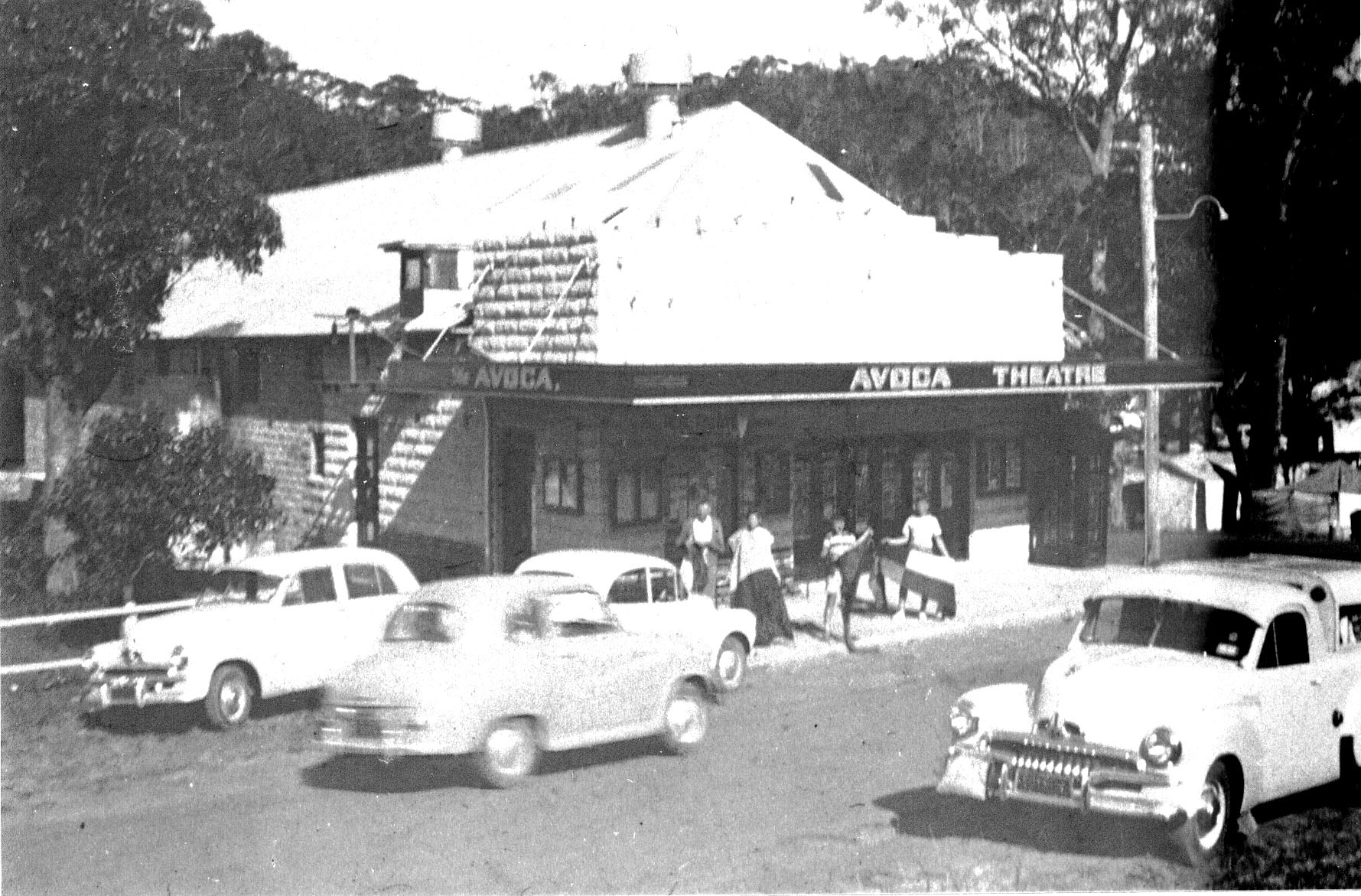
Avoca Beach Theatre in 1951

Growing up, Norman Hunter (Snr) and his family would travel from their home in Emu Plains to Avoca Beach for the holidays.

In 1948, Hunter permanently relocated to Avoca in the hopes the warmer weather would improve his wife Dulcie's health. The Hunters began weekly outdoor screenings of films produced by Shell Australia. The money they initially raised from the screenings was put towards building a rockpool at Avoca Beach. Shortly after, Norman and his brother Mervyn applied to develop a 500-seat cinema.

Construction finally began on the theatre in the autumn of 1951 and it formally opened in December. The building was designed by local architect T.A. Mayo and due to shortages after World War II, most of the construction materials were recycled. The site's projectors and seats were repurposed from an MGM theatre in Manly, concrete blocks were made by a local farmer and steel support beams came from the Hunter's property in Emu Plains. Alongside the cinema, the building featured retail space for two additional shops. Norman attributed the idea for the cinema to Dulcie, who had recently passed away.

The first films screened at the cinema were the comedies Two Weeks with Love and The Big Hangover.

The theatre originally operated on Saturdays and during the school holidays, while on Sundays it held church services.

=== Under Paul Brennan ===
In 1974, 24-year-old Paul Brennan bought the business after the theatre suffered storm damage. Brennan undertook renovations of the site and installed a café. Under Brennan's custodianship, the cinema operated seven days a week and screened both first-release and classic films, while also holding events like live performances and annual dress-up parties. Brennan operated the theatre until 1992.

=== Dr Rod Gibbs Renovations ===
Leaseholder Rod Gibbs oversaw a renovation of the cinema during his tenure in the 1990s. Gibbs imported adjustable seating from a theatre being demolished in Florida. Upon arrival the seats were rust-proofed and uphsoletered before installation. Gibbs also upgraded the theatre's sound system and oversaw the construction of an upstairs office.

During the period, the cinema was notable among travellers for its complimentary tea and coffee.

=== Hansen Management ===
Before the release of The Phantom Menace in 1999, the cinema's manager, Peter Hindmarsh, spoke out against the "fairly horrible" restrictions placed on single-screen cinemas by distributors. 20th Century Fox required cinemas who chose to play the film to screen it for eight weeks, with three-day and two night sessions daily. Hindmarsh said, "our entire program is consumed by Star Wars".

The Avoca Beach Theatre celebrated 50th years since it opened in December 2001 and was listed by the National Trust of Australia.

In 2002, the building's owners Beth and Norman Hunter Jr acquired the site's adjoining garden at auction for $1.75 million. 200 people attended the auction to vocalise support for the Theatre and oppose housing developers. The cinema had previously used the gardens for al fresco dining and outdoor screenings.

In 2006, the site's leaseholder Lynda and Russell Hansen decided to temporarily close the cinema after the building failed to meet requirements for a Place of Public Entertainment licence. A Gosford City Council spokesperson said that if repairs weren't made they could move to enforce a work order on the site. While the cinema was closed, Hansen arranged screenings at nearby Kantara House in Green Point. After disagreements between the lessee and building owners about the repairs failed to resolve, Lynda and Russell Hansens decided to terminate their lease for the theatre.

=== Return to Hunter Family Management ===
In late 2006, Beth and Norman (Jr) Hunter took over operations of the theatre. It was the first time the Hunter family had operated the cinema since the 1970s. The cinema was reopened after interior renovations were completed.

In 2008, the cinema celebrated 60 years since films began screening in the Hunter's backyard with a screening of The Red Shoes. The cinema commemorated the occasion by framing and displaying their archive of retro movie posters.

Avoca Beach Theatre won the Australian International Movie Convention's Best National Independent Regional Cinema Award in 2008 and 2010, 11 & 12.

In 2009, the cinema hosted The Coasties Film Festival as an initiative to highlight local talent. Australian film critic Margaret Pomeranz and cinematographer Don McAlpine were chosen as Patrons for the festival. The festival received over 100 entries and featured a special screening of Breaker Morant.

In April 2016, local actor Martin Ashley Jones partnered with the cinema to host blue2blue, Australia's first annual Drone and Action Camera Film Festival. Jones believed it was the perfect time to start the initiative after "how many locals already have cameras stuck on their surfboards, skateboards and bike helmets and ... the number of drones I've seen up in the air".

During the COVID-19 pandemic in 2021, the cinema's owners called for an extension of the Australian Federal Government's Job Keeper support payments. While federal government financial support was about to end, cinemas were still restricted to 75 per cent capacity. NSW cinemas were forced to close in both 2020 and 2021 due to the NSW government's lockdown restrictions.

In 2023, an accessible floor and new seating were installed to remove all steps from the theatre floor.

=== Planned redevelopment ===
After the Hunters purchased the site's adjoining garden in 2002, Norman Hunter stated that plans were in the work to expand the complex. Hunter expressed interest in extra cinema screens, apartments, a restaurant and a stage for outdoor concerts.

In 2003, the Hunters showcased plans to expand the cinema. The plans included 2 extra screens, 5 apartments, a 60-seat restaurant, a gallery, and basement parking for 16 cars. Mrs Hunter stated the development was integral to the Cinema's survival. Members of the local community, including the cinema's leaseholder Lynda Hansen, opposed the plans for the redevelopment. Hansen stated the proposed development was too big for the area.

In 2005, local filmmaker Michael Rubbo's short film Our Little Treasure, which outlined opposition to the redevelopment, screened at the cinema.

A Gosford City Council report on the development's local environment plan stated the development was "satisfactory 'in principle' from a land use viewpoint" but did not handle concerns raised by the National Trust, the NSW Heritage Office or the local community. The council voted to approve the plan and forwarded it to the NSW State Government. Planning Minister Frank Sartor approved the plan, with restrictions on the site's size and changes to the original theatre.

In 2012, the Hunters submitted a formal development application for the site that included a five-screen cinema, five units, a gallery and a café. Mr Hunter stated "Single-screen cinemas are no longer a viable business option." In 2015, Gosford Council voted to reject the planned development. The council was concerned about issues with parking, flooding and how the building's size would clash with the local area's character. In 2016, the Council added the theatre to a list of proposed heritage protected sites. After the Hunters lodged an appeal in the Land and Environment Court, the development plan was approved in 2017. The court found the site was not worthy of a heritage listing and the approved plan saw a reduction from a 5 screen complex to 4.

In 2022, modifications to the development application were announced. The plans include the site's original theatre, a new 54-seat theatre with adjoining café, a 32-seat theatre and a piano bar that doubles as a cinema. The site would also feature five apartments.

== Schedule and repertoire ==
Avoca Beach Theatre offers both film screenings and live on stage musical performances. The theatre has seen performances from acts like David Helfgott, Amelia Farrugia, Teddy Tahu Rhodes & Simon Tedeschi. Frequent performers also include tribute bands to acts like The Beatles, Blues Brothers, Billy Joel, Elton John and the Ratpac.

Alongside the theatre's traditional cinema offerings, it specialises in independent, international and arthouse cinema, National Theatre Live and retrospective screenings. Throughout the year the theatre plays hosts to a variety of film festivals like the French Film Festival, RunNation Film Festival & Ocean Film Festival. The cinema also hosts a range of special screenings with themed fancy dress events and charity fundraisers being a regular part of the lineup.

The theatre is home to the Avoca Beach Comedy Club.

The cinema has a film discussion group which meets first session each Wednesday & Thursday to see the week's new movie.
