= Jean St. Clair (deaf actress) =

English actress (born 1966)

Jean St. Clair (born 1966) is an English actress, screenwriter, director, producer and British Sign Language consultant. She has twice won Best Actress at the French deaf film festival Clin d'œil. St. Clair is Deaf and a British Sign Language user.

== Biography ==
St. Clair attended Mary Hare School and then trained with the British Theatre of the Deaf. She then worked with National Theatre of the Deaf in the US, and later joined the Birmingham Repertory Theatre, where she was the first UK Deaf actress in an otherwise hearing production.

Her extensive theatre career has involved working in United States, Australia, South Africa and the West End, playing the lead in Children of a Lesser God. In 2016, she performed as Lyapkin-Tyapkin in The Government Inspector at Birmingham Repertory Theatre, followed by a UK tour. She co-founded a theatre company, the Fingersmith, with Jeni Draper and Kaite O’Reilly.

She was awarded Best Actress for her role in the short movie Still Here. She wrote and directed an award-winning film, If I don’t Lose, I’ll Lose, starring Caroline Parker, and the black comedy Signs of An Affair, for which she won Best Actress at the French deaf film festival Clin d'Oeil in 2017.

St. Clair worked as a BSL Artistic Director on Doctor Who and on CBBC’s show Magic Hands.
