= I Am What I Am (La Cage aux Folles song) =

Broadway musical song

"I Am What I Am" is a song originally introduced in the Broadway musical La Cage aux Folles. The song is the finale number of the musical's first act, and performed by the character of Albin Mougeotte, first played by George Hearn. His version appears on the original cast album released in 1983. The song was composed by Jerry Herman.

== Gloria Gaynor version ==
"I Am What I Am"

Single by Gloria Gaynor

from the album I Am Gloria Gaynor
- B-side: More Than Enough (7")
- Released: 1983
- Genre: Dance-pop, soul
- Length: 5:56 (album version & 12"), 3:51 (7")
- Label: Chrysalis
- Songwriter: Jerry Herman
- Producer: Joel Diamond

Gloria Gaynor singles chronology
| "America" (1983) | "I Am What I Am" (1983) | "Strive" (1984) |

The song was released as a single by Gloria Gaynor in 1983 and went on to become one of the singer's best-known songs. Producer Joel Diamond recognized the song's disco potential when he saw La Cage Aux Folles on Broadway and arranged for Gaynor – whose 1978 ...Park Avenue Sound album he'd produced – to record it. A club hit in America, arranged by Marcus Barone, with a remix by Shep Pettibone, Gaynor's version of "I Am What I Am" was a Top 40 hit throughout Europe, becoming established as a global gay anthem.

=== Track listing ===
- 7" single

A. "I Am What I Am" – 3:51
B. "More Than Enough" – 4:46

- 12" single

A. "I Am What I Am" (Extended Version) – 5:56
B. "I Am What I Am" (Dub Mix) – 5:10

=== Chart performance ===
| Chart (1983–1984) | Peak position |
|---|---|
| Australia (Kent Music Report) | 69 |
| Belgium | 36 |
| Germany | 35 |
| Ireland (IRMA) | 18 |
| Netherlands (MegaCharts) | 37 |
| South Africa (Springbok) | 12 |
| Switzerland | 20 |
| UK Singles Chart (OCC) | 13 |
| U.S. Dance Music/Club Play Singles (Billboard) | 3 |
| U.S. R&B Singles (Billboard) | 82 |
| U.S. Billboard Bubbling Under the Hot 100 | 2 |

== Sandra Mihanovich version ==
"Soy lo que soy"

Song by Sandra Mihanovich

from the album Soy lo que soy
- Language: Spanish
- Released: 1984
- Genre: Pop
- Length: 4:07
- Label: Microfon
- Producer: Claudio Kleiman

Audio sample
- Sample of the song: file; help

Argentine singer Sandra Mihanovich recorded a famous Spanish-language version of the song titled "Soy lo que soy", included in her 1984 studio album of the same name. The singer discovered the song when she attended a gay nightclub in Rio de Janeiro with her producer Claudio Kleiman, where she saw a drag queen performing to Gloria Gaynor's version. Mihanovich was "blown away" by the song and decided to record it in Spanish, so that its message was understood by her public. Mihanovich also released a live version of the song in her 1985 album Sandra en Shams, recorded at Shams, a tea house turned pub in Belgrano of which she was a house act. Shams was one of the main venues of new wave of musical acts that performed in a circuit of small bars and pubs centered in Buenos Aires.

Now regarded as a classic of Argentine popular music, "Soy lo que soy" was a big commercial success and consolidated Mihanovich's rising career, becoming one of her signature songs. It became an important gay anthem for the LGBT community in Argentina, which was experiencing a moment of cultural and activist boom after the end of the military dictatorship in 1983. Mihanovich already had another gay anthem in her repertoire, her 1981 breakthrough single "Puerto Pollensa", a love song between women that continues to be celebrated by the local lesbian community to this day. Mihanovich was a lesbian, although not openly, a topic that caused much speculation in the media and increased when she formed a musical duo with her partner Celeste Carballo in the late 1980s. Their controversial 1990 lesbian-themed album Mujer contra mujer is now regarded as a landmark in lesbian visibility in Argentine society.

Although she became a gay icon, Mihanovich refused to talk about her sexuality with the media and never adopted an activist stance. Despite the fact that in 1990 Carballo confirmed that they had been a couple, and that it was an open secret, Mihanovich never publicly acknowledged her homosexuality until 2012, when she announced that she had formed a family with another woman. In a 2020 television interview, she said: "I'm not as brave as you think I am. I was finding what I wanted to say in my songs. The discovery of "Soy lo que soy" was a huge thing. Today it is a privilege to think and say what I want and that my way of being is respected." "Soy lo que soy" continues to be celebrated as a national gay anthem, and is played each year at the end of the Buenos Aires pride march. Writing for Página/12 in 2009, lesbian feminist Marta Dillon described the song as the "most beloved anthem for the local queer community".

== 2012 Paralympics ==
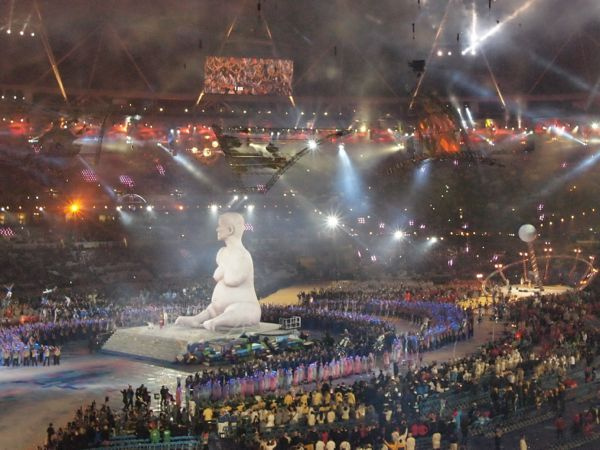
The 2012 Paralympics Opening Ceremony where thousands sang "I am What I am" watched by millions

During the 2012 Summer Paralympics opening ceremony, Beverley Knight, Deaf performer Caroline Parker and Lizzie Emeh appeared to close the ceremony with a performance of "I Am What I Am". A pyrotechnic display took place as the entire cast flooded the stadium to form the three agitos of the Paralympic logo and the performers and the audience joined in the song using sign-language.

== Other use ==
- The Gay and Lesbian Kingdom of the Coral Sea Islands, a former micronation that occupied the Coral Sea Islands off Australia, adopted the song as their national anthem.
- Virgin Atlantic used the song in their 2022 and 2023 advert, featuring cast and crew of different backgrounds and fashion. The song was used to show that those people are, as the song states, "what they are".
- Catherine Tate performed the song in character as Joannie "Nan" Taylor, in the sixth episode of the first series of her sketch show when the character's grandson (Mathew Horne) asked her "Why are you like this?"
- In 2023, Italian singer Senhit released a cover of the Gaynor version to promote her 2024 I Am What I Am tour.
