= Lizzie Emeh =

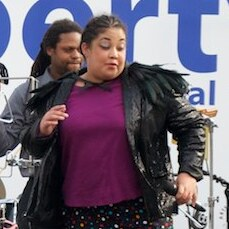
- Emeh in September 2010 at the Liberty Festival

Background information
- Born: 1977; Notting Hill, London, England
- Died: 2021 (aged 44)
- Genres: soul; jazz
- Occupations: Singer-songwriter and disability rights activist
- Instrument: vocals
- Label: Heart n Soul
- Spouse: Eddie (Jimmy) Goodman (m. 2016)

Lizzie Emeh (1977–2021) was a British singer, songwriter, and disability rights activist. She could not talk until she was 4, but she created her own albums and performed at the 2012 Paralympic Opening Ceremony.

== Life ==
Emeh was born in Notting Hill, London, in a difficult birth in about 1977. Her parents, Kathleen (born O'Neill) and Jonathan Emeh had Irish and Nigerian heritages. She had difficulty learning and she defied some predictions when she began to speak and walk when she was four. She had to contend with haemophilia, pneumonia and meningitis and at some point her spleen was removed. Emeh noted that there were others worse off than she was. When she was thirteen she left mainstream education to attend a specialist boarding school, Parkwood Hall in Swanley, Kent, for six years. She found it harder to learn new things, but her grandmother sang and she inspired Emeh.Her grandmother told her that she would succeed at singing. In an interview, Emeh has stated that another one of her biggest inspirations was The Beatles.

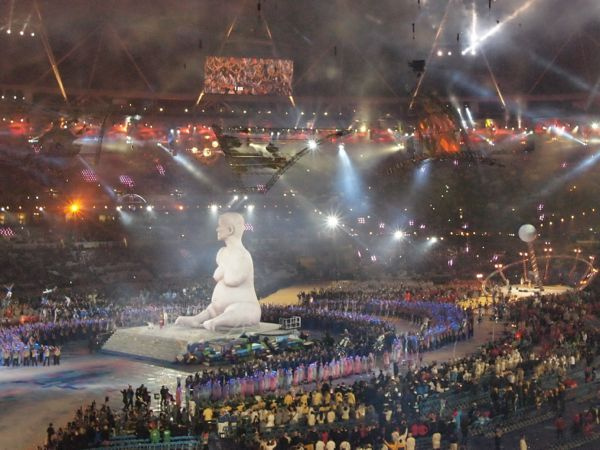
The 2012 Paralympics Opening Ceremony where Emeh helped lead thousands sing "I am What I am"

In 1999, she discovered the Deptford-based Heart n Soul organisation and they discovered her singing talent. With that charity she sang at three Glastonbury Festivals and a festival in Asia. She found that she could write songs and she decided that she wanted to create her own music album. She was inspired by the American singer Stevie Wonder, who succeeded despite his disability. She could not read or write and her father worried that she would be exploited, but she was encouraged by Heart n Soul and an album named Loud and Proud was released in 2009. It is believed to be the first solo album created by a British artist with learning difficulties.

During the 2012 Summer Paralympics opening ceremony, Beverley Knight, deaf performer Caroline Parker and Emeh appeared on the Moon stage to close the ceremony with a performance of "I Am What I Am". A pyrotechnic display took place as the entire cast flooded the stadium to form the three agitos of the Paralympic logo. The performers and the audience joined in the song using sign-language.

== Death and legacy ==
In 2020 writer Saba Salman put together a book with contributions from leading people with learning disabilities. "Made Possible: Stories of success by people with disabilities – in their own words" included contributions from the artist, Laura Broughton, the actor Sarah Gordy and Emeh.

Emeh died in 2021 at the age of 44. In 2024, she was a Google Doodle on 9 October, the anniversary of her first album being released.
