= Captain Canada (character) =

Canadian superhero

Captain Canada is a superhero created by CJON-DT (NTV) owner Geoff Stirling, his son Scott Stirling and Filipino artist Danny Bulanadi in the late 1970s. Captain Canada debuted in 1979 in the Captain Newfoundland comic strip published in the Newfoundland Herald and later appeared in the Atlantis graphic novel, which featured covers by Boris Vallejo. Since his creation, he has become a mascot for NTV and has appeared in numerous promos for the station, the most recent being created by Vancouver based Borderless World Productions in 2010. Captain Canada has made many public appearances, including the annual Santa Claus Parade in St. John's, Newfoundland. There is a plaque in Arizona marking his first manifestation in the United States. Captain Canada also appeared in the 1980 television movie Captain Newfoundland and the Tip of Atlantis, scenes of which were used in NTV promos during the 1990s.

== Fictional character biography ==
Daniel Eaton, a young man from Montreal, was chosen by Captain Newfoundland to become Captain Canada. His duty is to protect the nation of Canada and the freedoms it stands for. Captain Newfoundland provided Daniel with a suit that granted him new supernatural physical and mental abilities. The suit is controlled by Daniel's mind, however all of the powers of the suit were not available to him immediately, Daniel needed to "unlock" new powers by proving himself worthy. The Captain earned his first ability, the power of flight, after saving a woman who was kidnapped by some thugs. While Captain Newfoundland is Captain Canada's primary teacher, Captain Canada has also received help and advice from Captain Freedom and Mademoiselle. He is able to communicate telepathically with other heroes and has been trained to ascend to higher levels of consciousness and politeness.

Captain Newfoundland is an ancient alien astronaut, one of the last remnants of a colony of a "godlike" race that occupied the lost city of Atlantis in prehistoric time and claimed responsibility for such feats as the moai on Easter Island and the Great Pyramids of Giza. Atlantis was intended to be a repository for all knowledge as a gift for mankind, but the godlike citizens decided to destroy the settlement once humans turned against themselves in war, fearing the knowledge would be used for evil. Atlantis (said to be located on the Grand Banks) and all members of this godlike race except Captain Newfoundland cast themselves into oblivion, never to be discovered again until Vikings landed on Newfoundland in the tenth century A.D. Two assistants have been explicitly mentioned, the Silver Warrior (a woman wearing a stereotypical First Nations headdress) and the Golden Dove (a woman in a domino mask and cleavage-accentuating angel attire). Captain Newfoundland preaches that there are leaders, currently imprisoned by world society, who, through New Age spiritualism, can break free, harness supernatural powers and lead society toward world peace.

== See also ==
- Johnny Canuck
