= Penguin Island (TV series) =

- Genre: Nature; Documentary; Drama
- Created by: Sally Ingleton
- Written by: Simon Target
- Directed by: Simon Target
- Narrated by: Rolf Harris
- Composer: Dale Cornelius
- Country of origin: Australia
- Original language: English
- No. of series: 1
- No. of episodes: 6

Production
- Executive producer: Sally Ingleton
- Producer: Sally Ingleton
- Production location: Australia
- Cinematography: David Parer
- Running time: 24 minutes

Original release
- Network: ABC TV BBC TV Arte
- Release: 30 June – 31 July 2010

Penguin Island is an Australian natural history television documentary series about the little penguin.

The series premiered on 30 June 2010 on BBC TV. In Australia the show aired on ABC TV. The executive producer and series producer was Sally Ingleton, the series director was Simon Target and the director of photography was David Parer. Penguin Island was produced by 360 Degree Films, ABC Documentary, Film Victoria, BBC Television and Arte France. The series comprises six half-hour episodes and was filmed over a year and a half commencing spring 2007.

Penguin Island used underwater satellite tracking and Big Brother-style video surveillance to tell the story of several penguin families who live in a colony.

Over six 30-minute episodes, Penguin Island followed the penguins as a team of rangers and scientists monitor and protect them through the breeding season.

Filmed over a year by some of Australia's documentary filmmakers, Penguin Island first screened in Australia on 30 September 2010.

== Episodes ==
=== Season 1: 2010 ===
Episode	Title	Original airdate	Viewers	Nightly Rank
1	"Love Is in the Air"	30 June 2010	613,000	5
2	"Danger in the Penguin Colony"	6 July 2010	1,084,000	14
3	"Where Have All The Fish Gone?"	11 July 2010	1,006,000	NA
4	"A Heatwave Hits The Colony"	21 July 2010	1,040,000	13
5	"Rocky Finds Love at Last"	28 July 2010	988,000	12
6	"Summer Ends on Phillip Island"	31 July 2010	1,001,000	10

== See also ==
- List of Australian television series
- List of programs broadcast by ABC (Australian TV network)
