= She (Wednesday Theatre) =

- Wednesday Theatre episode
- Episode no.: Season 3 Episode 43
- Directed by: Christopher Muir
- Original air date: 20 December 1967
- Running time: 30 mins

Episode chronology
← Previous "The Firebird"	Next → "The Hollow Crown"

"She" is a 1967 Australian television play. It was a filmed ballet set in an Antarctic base. It screened as part of Wednesday Theatre. "She" aired on 20 December 1967 in Sydney, and on 27 December 1967 in Brisbane.

It was written especially for the ABC. It was choreographed by Spanish choreographer Juan Corelli. Correli says he was inspired by the music of Italian composer Luciano Chailly. "After listening to the music I had the idea of a fantasy set in Antarctica," he said. "It is something that could only be produced on television."

It starred Elke Neidhardt and was directed by Christopher Muir who was her husband.

== Cast ==
- Gerard Sibrit
- Elke Neidhardt
