= Elke Neidhardt =

Actress, director (1941-2013)

Elke Neidhardt AM
- Born: Elke Cordelia Neidhart; 5 July 1941; Stuttgart, Germany
- Died: 25 November 2013 (aged 72)
- Education: State University of Music and Performing Arts Stuttgart
- Occupations: Actress, theatre and opera director
- Spouse: Christopher Muir (married 1967, divorced 1977)
- Partner: Norman Kaye
- Family: Fabian Muir (son)

Elke Cordelia Neidhardt AM (5 July 1941 – 25 November 2013) was a German-born actress and opera and theatre director. She spent most of her career after 1967 in Australia and became an Australian citizen in 2007. She appeared in theatre, television and feature films in Germany, Austria, France and Australia, and directed operas in Zurich, Amsterdam, Aix-en-Provence, Salzburg, Vienna, Cologne and Australia. She is best known in Australia for directing operas with Opera Australia, and most particularly for directing the first full modern Australian production of Richard Wagner's Ring Cycle, in Adelaide in 2004.

== Early life ==
Elke Neidhardt was born in Stuttgart, on July 5, 1941, the youngest of three children to father, Karl (a physician, Latin scholar and intellectual) and mother, Vilma (also a doctor). At the age of three, Neidhardt survived an Allied bombardment in Ludwigsburg, which decimated her family's neighbouring home.

Following in the footsteps of her parents and brother, Neidhardt studied medicine at Berlin University for a year, but hated it, so her father sent her to a finishing school, to study deportment and domestic undertakings. Concurrently, she took private lessons in dramatic art (much to the disapproval of her mother), beginning the trajectory of her acting career. She then studied at the State University of Music and Performing Arts Stuttgart.

== Career ==
Neidhardt directed operas in Zurich, Amsterdam, Aix-en-Provence, Salzburg and Vienna. She also made two films in Germany Der Schatten: Ein Märchen für Erwachsene (1963) and the Jerry Cotton thriller Mordnacht in Manhattan (1965).

In 1963, Neidhardt moved to Vienna, where she landed numerous stage roles at Theater in der Josefstadt, and made regular appearances in film and television.

After meeting future husband Christopher Muir, an Australian director at the ABC, Neidhardt relocated to Melbourne, Australia. In 1967 she played Dr. Anna Steiner, a German doctor, in several episodes of the television series Skippy the Bush Kangaroo. Other Australian television appearances included The Link Men (1970) and Shannon's Mob (1975). She was also in a small number of Australian feature films, including Libido (1973) in which she appeared nude), Alvin Purple (1973) and The True Story of Eskimo Nell (1975). Her last film was Inside Looking Out (1977).

From 1977 to 1990 Neidhardt was the resident director for Opera Australia. She returned to Germany in 1990, after being headhunted for the role of principal resident director for Cologne State Opera (Oper der Stadt Koln). She worked there for six years, directing several operas including three productions of Richard Wagner's Ring Cycle, before again returning to Australia.

In 2001 Neidhardt directed the first fully staged Australian production of Wagner's Parsifal, for the State Opera of South Australia. In 2004 she directed the first full modern Australian production of the Ring Cycle, in Adelaide, which attracted worldwide critical acclaim and won several Helpmann Awards in 2005.

Other operas she directed in Australia or overseas included Don Giovanni, Tosca, La traviata, Salome, Werther, Fidelio, Lohengrin, Andrea Chénier, The Flying Dutchman, I puritani, La finta semplice, Il Trovatore and Tannhäuser. She also directed a touring production of Shakespeare's A Midsummer Night's Dream for the Bell Shakespeare Company. She lectured at NIDA and the Sydney Conservatorium of Music. In 2006 she was a member of the judging panel for Operatunity Oz, along with Richard Gill, Yvonne Kenny and Antoinette Halloran.

Neidhardt had a reputation for clashing with the conductors she worked with. She was also known for her bluntness and frankness, describing Australian culture as "quite massively behind"; criticising the prudishness of theatrical authorities about things such as nudity; regarding the Sydney Opera House as "awful to work in"; and criticising the decision of arts minister Peter Garrett not to repeat her 2004 Adelaide production of the Ring Cycle despite its overwhelming success.

== Filmography ==
=== Film ===
Year	Title	Role	Type
1963	Der Schatten: Ein Märchen für Erwachsene		Feature film
1965	Mordnacht in Manhattan	Sophie Latimore	Feature film
1967	She		TV play
1973	Libido	Penelope	Feature film
1973	Alvin Purple	Woman in Blue Movie	Feature film
1975	The True Story of Eskimo Nell		Feature film
1976	Illuminations		Feature film
1977	Inside Looking Out	Marianne	Feature film

=== Television ===
Year	Title	Role	Type
1967	Skippy the Bush Kangaroo	Dr. Anna Steiner	TV series
1970	The Link Men		TV series
1975	Shannon's Mob		TV series
2006	Operatunity Oz	Judge	TV documentary series

== Theatre ==
=== As actor ===
Year	Title	Role	Venue / Co.
1960s	Uncle Vanya	Principal role	Theater in der Josefstadt, Austria
1960s	Who's Afraid of Virginia Woolf?	Principal role	Theater in der Josefstadt, Austria
1971	Uncle Vanya	Ilyeba Andreveyna (Yelene)	St Martins Theatre, Melbourne
1973	Suddenly at Home	Ruth Bachler	Comedy Theatre, Melbourne with J. C. Williamson's

=== As director/producer ===
Year	Title	Role	Venue / Co.
	Various operas	Director	Zurich, Amsterdam, Aix-en-Provence, Salzburg, Vienna
1975	Jenůfa	Assistant Producer	Canberra Theatre
1977: 1984; 2002	Fidelio	Director	Princess Theatre Melbourne, Her Majesty's Theatre, Brisbane, Sydney Opera House with Opera Queensland
1977; 1987	The Flying Dutchman	Director	Sydney Opera House, State Theatre, Melbourne with Victoria State Opera
1978; 1979; 1984	The Merry Widow	Resident Director	Sydney Opera House, Festival Theatre, Adelaide, Palais Theatre, Melbourne
1978	Fra Diavolo	Producer	Canberra Theatre
1978	Pagliacci / Suor Angelica	Producer	Canberra Theatre
1978	Don Giovanni	Associate Director	Princess Theatre, Melbourne with Opera Australia
1978; 1979	Don Giovanni	Resident Director	Sydney Opera House, Canberra Theatre, Palais Theatre, Melbourne with Opera Australia
1978; 1979	Norma	Resident Director	Sydney Opera House, Her Majesty's Theatre, Brisbane
1978; 1979; 1982	Cavalleria Rusticana / Pagliacci	Director	Sydney Opera House, Princess Theatre, Melbourne
1979	Albert Herring	Stage Director	Sydney Opera House
1980	Fra Diavolo	Re-Stager	Sydney Opera House
1980	The Girl of the Golden West	Re-stager	Canberra Theatre
1980	Les Contes d'Hoffmann (The Tales of Hoffmann)	Re-Stager	Sydney Opera House
1980; 1983	Don Giovanni	Producer	Sydney Opera House, Canberra Theatre with Opera Australia
1980	Káťa Kabanová	Resident Director	Sydney Opera House
1980	A Midsummer Night's Dream	Resident Director	Sydney Opera House
1981	Les Contes d'Hoffmann (The Tales of Hoffmann)	Director	Palais Theatre, Melbourne
1982	Rise and Fall of the City of Mahagonny	Producer	Sydney Opera House
1982	Salome	Producer	Sydney Opera House with State Opera of South Australia & Opera Australia
1982	Hamlet	Resident Producer	Sydney Opera House with Opera Australia
1983	Otello	Resident Director	Sydney Opera House
1984	Les Contes d'Hoffmann (The Tales of Hoffmann)	Resident Director	Palais Theatre, Melbourne
1984	Das Rheingold	Producer	Sydney Opera House
1985	Norma	Producer	Sydney Opera House
1985	Un ballo in maschera (A Masked Ball)	Producer	Sydney Opera House
1985	Káťa Kabanová	Director	Sydney Opera House
1985; 1986; 1990; 1996; 1999; 2002; 2004; 2007	Il trovatore (The Troubadour)	Director	Sydney Opera House, Lyric Theatre, Brisbane, State Theatre, Melbourne, Festival Theatre, Adelaide, His Majesty's Theatre, Perth with Opera Queensland, State Opera of South Australia, Opera Australia & West Australian Opera
1985; 1987; 1990	Lohengrin	Director	State Theatre, Melbourne, Sydney Opera House with Victoria State Opera & Opera Australia
1986	I puritani	Director	State Theatre, Melbourne with Victoria State Opera
1986; 1994	Salome	Director	State Theatre, Melbourne, Adelaide Festival Centre with State Opera of South Australia & Opera Australia
1987	La fille du régiment	Director	Sydney Opera House, State Theatre, Melbourne
1987	Alcina	Director	State Theatre, Melbourne, Sydney Opera House
1987; 1988; 1994; 1998	La Cenerentola (Cinderella)	Director	Sydney Opera House, State Theatre, Melbourne
1988; 1992; 1993	Tosca	Director	State Theatre, Melbourne, Sydney Opera House
1989	Les Contes d'Hoffmann (The Tales of Hoffmann)	Associate Director	Sydney Opera House
1989; 2002	Un ballo in maschera (A Masked Ball)	Stage Director	Sydney Opera House with Opera Australia
1989; 1994	La traviata		Cologne Opera Studio (Oper der Stadt Koln)
1990; 2009	Werther	Director	Sydney Opera House, State Theatre, Melbourne
1990	Eugene Onegin	Director	Sydney Opera House
1990	Les Huguenots	Repetiteur	Sydney Opera House
1990s	The Ring: Der Ring des Niebelungen	Resident Director	Cologne State Opera (Oper der Stadt Koln)
1990s	Tosca		Cologne Opera Studio (Oper der Stadt Koln)
1993	La finta semplice	Producer	Cologne Opera Studio (Oper der Stadt Koln)
1993	Die Fledermaus		Cologne Opera Studio (Oper der Stadt Koln)
1997	A Weekend with The Ring	Director	Scott Theatre, Adelaide
1997	Werther	Stage Director	Sydney Opera House
1998; 2007	Tannhauser	Stage Director	Sydney Opera House, State Theatre, Melbourne with Opera Australia
1999; 2002	Fidelio	Stage Director	Opera Australia
2000	A Midsummer Night's Dream	Director	Sydney Opera House, Playhouse, Canberra, Athenaeum Theatre, Melbourne, Theatre Royal, Hobart, Princess Theatre, Launceston, Gold Coast Arts Centre, Geelong Arts Centre, His Majesty's Theatre, Perth with Bell Shakespeare
2001; 2002	Andrea Chénier	Stage Director	Sydney Opera House, Festival Theatre, Adelaide with State Opera of South Australia, Opera Queensland & Opera Australia
2001	Parsifal	Stage Director	Festival Theatre, Adelaide with State Opera of South Australia
2004	The Ring: Der Ring des Niebelungen – Das Rheingold (The Rhinegold), Die Walküre (The Valkyrie), Siegfried, Götterdämmerung (The Twilight of the Gods)	Stage Director	Festival Theatre, Adelaide with State Opera of South Australia
2005	The Ringleaders	Director	Sydney Opera House
2008	Don Giovanni	Stage Director	Sydney Opera House, Canberra Theatre, Palais Theatre, Melbourne with Opera Australia
2009	Werther	Stage Director	Opera Australia
2013; 2014	Il trovatore (The Troubadour)	Stage Director	West Australian Opera

== Awards ==
Year	Title	Awards	Category	Result
2005	The Ring Cycle	Helpmann Awards	Best Direction of an Opera	Won
2011	Elke Neidhart	Order of Australia	Service to the performing arts as an opera director and producer, and through the tuition and mentoring of young emerging artists	Honoured

== Personal life ==
Neidhardt met future husband Christopher Muir, an Australian television director, in Munich in 1965, when he was studying European TV, films and theatre for the ABC. Originally they were to marry when Neidhardt first arrived in Australia in early 1966, but Muir contracted tuberculosis, so Neidhardt returned to Europe to resume her acting contracts until he recovered. She arrived back in Australia with plans to marry before Christmas, only to be hospitalised with appendicitis, so the wedding was postponed a second time. They eventually married in 1967, at 'Athanor', an old stone house, on a property in Narrewarren, outside Melbourne.

Neidhardt and Muir had a son, Fabian, before divorcing in 1977. Fabian Muir is now a Berlin-based photographer and writer.

Neidhardt subsequently had a 35-year relationship with Australian actor and musician Norman Kaye, nursing him through the final stages of Alzheimer's disease until his death in May 2007. He had frequently proposed marriage to her, but she always declined, feeling that marriage was unnecessary.

== Australian citizenship and honours ==
Neidhardt became an Australian citizen in early 2007. She was appointed a Member of the Order of Australia (AM) in the Australia Day Honours 2011, "for service to the performing arts as an opera director and producer, and through the tuition and mentoring of young emerging artists".

== Death ==
She died on 25 November 2013, aged 72, three months after being diagnosed with cancer. Her death occurred during Neil Armfield's new staging of the Ring Cycle in Melbourne.
