= Waiting for Fidel =

- Directed by: Michael Rubbo
- Produced by: Tom Daly; Michael Rubbo
- Starring: Joey Smallwood, Geoff Stirling, Michael Rubbo
- Cinematography: Douglas Kiefer
- Edited by: Michael Rubbo; John Fricker
- Distributed by: National Film Board of Canada
- Release date: 1974
- Running time: 57 min 50 s
- Country: Canada
- Language: English
- Budget: $123,155 (CAD)

Waiting for Fidel is a 1974 Canadian documentary by Michael Rubbo and starring director Rubbo, former premier of Newfoundland and Labrador Joey Smallwood and Newfoundland media mogul Geoff Stirling. It depicts Rubbo, Smallwood, and Stirling's unsuccessful attempt to interview Cuban leader Fidel Castro.

== Synopsis ==
Two Canadians, former premier of Newfoundland Joey Smallwood and broadcaster Geoff Stirling, travel to Cuba in a private jet. They attempt to meet Fidel Castro to discuss Cuba–United States relations, but Castro never shows up. Instead, much of the film consists of discussions between progressive Smallwood and free-marketer Stirling about the effects of the Castro regime.

The film's name is a take on the play Waiting for Godot, which has a similar conceit of two men conversing while they await a guest who never arrives.

== Critical reception and influence ==
New York Times film reviewer Richard Eder observed that "It is about Cuba, in a way, but it is also about the difficulty in seeing Cuba for what it may be." The film has been cited as an inspiration for director Michael Moore.

== Works cited ==
- Evans, Gary (1991). In the National Interest: A Chronicle of the National Film Board of Canada from 1949 to 1989. University of Toronto Press. ISBN 0802027849.
