= Simon Target =

British-Australian filmmaker (born 1962)

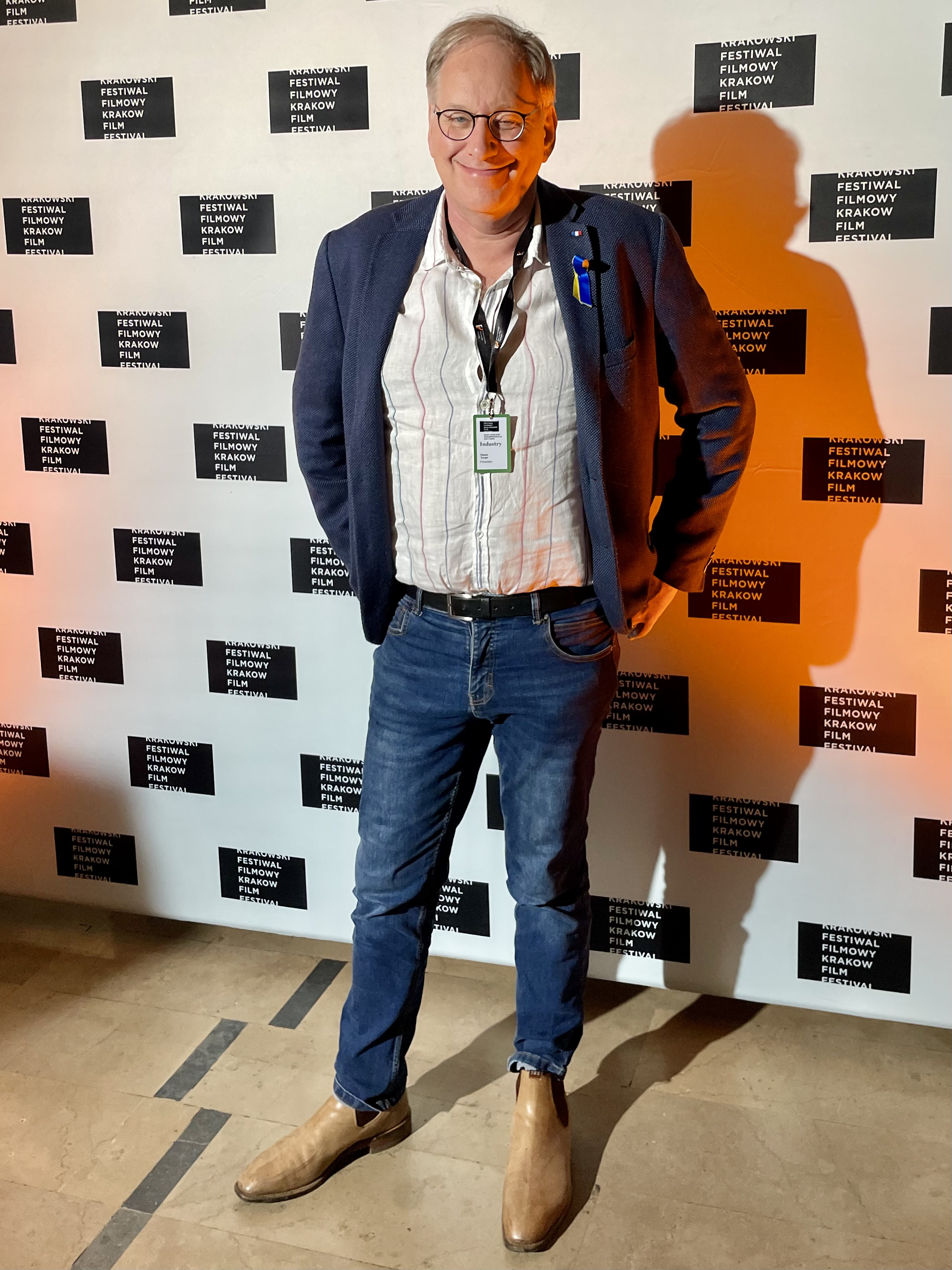
- Target at Kraków Film Festival, 2022
- Born: 22 January 1962 (age 64); Tonbridge, United Kingdom
- Occupation: Documentary filmmaker
- Years active: 1986-present

Simon Target (/ˈtɑːrʒeɪ/; born 22 January 1962) is a British-Australian filmmaker. He is best known for a series of television documentaries he made for the Australian Broadcasting Corporation which include King's School (on The King's School, Sydney), Flight for Life (about the Royal Flying Doctor Service of Australia), The Academy (on the Australian Defence Force Academy), and Rough Justice (about the legal profession). Uni, his study of a group of dissolute arts students at Sydney University, featured Charles Firth, Craig Reucassel and Andrew Hansen, who formed the comedy group The Chaser. Hansen later satirised Target in CNNNN, where he played the network's British correspondent who was also called Simon Target.

== Recent works ==
Masha & Valentyna, Target's 50 minute documentary about the Russian invasion of Ukraine, was broadcast by SBStv on World Refugee Day, June 20 2023, and shown in Australia's Federal Parliament, July 31 2023, in a special screening sponsored by Senator Catryna Bilyk and Senator Linda Reynolds. Warrawong - the windy place on the hill made in remote NSW during Australia's Covid pandemic restrictions, was selected for competition at Sydney Film Festival and Kraków Film Festival in 2022. It tells the story of an elderly couple reluctant to leave their farm, and launched the inaugural Gilgandra Film Festival, April 22, 23.

== Early life and education ==
Target was born in Tonbridge in the United Kingdom. His mother was Australian water colourist Patricia Prentice. He was educated at Westminster School, London, where he featured in a 1979 BBC television documentary Public School directed by Jonathan Gili. He then read English and Music at Trinity College, Cambridge from 1980 to 1983. He later obtained an MA in Film Production from Britain's National Film and Television School in 1986.

== Career ==
Target wrote and directed the feature film Backsliding, starring Tim Roth, with an original score by Australian composer Nigel Westlake, and the TV series Operatunity Oz - a nationwide talent search to find an ‘undiscovered’ opera singer. Target has also directed live opera for the stage in England and the United States, with artists such as Simon Keenlyside, Simon Russell Beale and conductor Andrew Parrott.

Other work includes TV series with Donna Hay, Curtis Stone, Ben O'Donoghue, Kylie Kwong, Ainsley Harriott and Rick Stein. In 2010 he wrote and directed the natural history series Penguin Island, with Rolf Harris for BBC Television. The series won Target prizes for best script and best direction at science/environmental film festivals in China and Germany, and at Envirofilm.

Target lives in Sydney, and is married to Polish doctor Beata Zatorska with whom he co-wrote the book Rose Petal Jam - Recipes and Stories from a Summer in Poland, published by Tabula Books, which won the 2012 Gourmand Award. Gerstenberg Verlag published a German language version 'Rosenmarmelade', which also won a Gourmand Award in 2014. Target and Zatorska produced 'Sugared Orange - Recipes and Stories from a Winter in Poland' published by Tabula in October 2013.

Target has made recent film profiles of artist Tim Storrier, iconic Australian actor/director John Bell, and theatre director Simon Stone (The Talented Mr Stone). His feature-length documentary A Town Called Brzostek won the Ewa Pięta Award for Best Film at the Ann Arbor Polish Film Festival and the 2015 Humanitarian Award, PFFA Chicago. It also won first prize at the Warsaw and Bucharest Jewish Film Festivals, and was selected for the Berlin Jewish Film Festival 2015. Translated into French and Hebrew, the film has been shown in many countries, including in synagogues in Oswięcim (Auschwitz), Paris and London, and to Israeli students in Tel Aviv embarking on tours of Poland.

In 2017, Target travelled to remote parts of Papua New Guinea to make the self filmed feature 'The Polish Missionaries'. The story of Catholic priests and nuns building clinics and schools in an often hostile environment premiered in Sydney Nov 2018 and in May 2019 at the Kraków Film Festival. It was later shown at the Dwa Brzegi (Two Riverbanks) Festival in the medieval town of Kazimierz Dolny. ABCtv screened a narrated and abridged version on its religious affairs program Compass in August 2019.

In April 2016, Simon Target was decorated by the Polish Ministry of Culture.
