= Operatunity =

Operatunity was a talent search— and Michael Waldman's film that documented it— in which the English National Opera conducted a nationwide search to find someone in the United Kingdom without professional opera experience, who could be coached to sing in a staged opera— Verdi's Rigoletto in the event— on the stage of London's Coliseum Theatre in the company of world-class performers, part of the ENO's regular season.

== Audition and choosing ==
The audition process followed a casting call for submitted videotapes, that resulted in some 2500 entries from a colorful group of which a hundred were auditioned in person, on a bus tour that encompassed regional auditions, which led to a series of London workshops for the final six participants, including an investment banker, a builder—who stood on a scaffolding at a construction site to belt out a Neapolitan song— an ex-police officer, wrestler and model, a supermarket cashier, and a blind mother of three. The finalists received intense vocal coaching and dramatic technique, as well as physical training and the fundamentals of stagecraft. Two finalists were selected, Jane Gilchrist and Denise Leigh, who shared the demanding role of Gilda onstage, in March 2003. The documentary follows their nerve-racking final days before the performance and the exhilaration of their operatic debut, combining real-life drama with the high theatrical drama and emotional intensity of grand opera.

In a sense, Operatunity was an expansion of ENO's program for young opera singers, The Knack, directed by Mary King, a panel member for Operatunity. A criterion for the selection, in addition to raw vocal talent, was the ability of a singer rapidly to put into practice guidance from the coaches. The other members of the panel consisted of Anthony Legge, head of music at the English National opera, Karen Gillingham, an actress singer trained at The Knack, Paul Daniel, conductor at ENO, and Philip Traugott, a classical music album producer.

== Winners ==
The winners followed up with concert tours and at the end of the year joined to sing the children's duet from Engelbert Humperdinck's Hansel and Gretel, broadcast on BBC Four, Christmas Day 2003.

Operatunity won a RAI Prix Italia in 2003.

== Australia ==
ABC TV and Opera Australia combined to produce Operatunity Oz, which offered Australians the comparable “operatunity”.

== New Zealand ==
Operatunity is a national concert company formed in the year 2000 which is now the major employer of singers in New Zealand. The founders Susan Boland (Artistic and Managing Director) and John Cameron (Director and CFO) perform regularly in their Daytime Concerts Series alongside many other professional New Zealand artists. They produce 8 national tours every year covering a variety of genres and tour to 24 different centres across New Zealand, performing over 200 concerts every year.

Operatunity creates concerts during the day in New Zealand, catering mostly to older people. The shows usually take place in the morning, and the performers provide refreshments after the show.

These concerts helped Operatunity Travel grow into what is now Australasias largest specialist Music Travel company. All tours are escorted by the performers that appear in the concerts and are known for their offerings.
