= Newfoundland Herald =

Defunct weekly magazine published in Newfoundland and Labrador, Canada

The Newfoundland Herald
- Frequency: Weekly
- Total circulation: 7,984 (March 2012)
- First issue: May 12, 1946
- Company: Sunday Herald Ltd.
- Country: Canada
- Based in: St. John's, Newfoundland and Labrador
- Language: English
- Website: www.nfldherald.com
- ISSN: 0824-3581

The Newfoundland Herald was a weekly news and entertainment magazine available throughout Newfoundland and Labrador, Canada that was published in St. John's.

The magazine was founded in 1946 by the late Geoff Stirling of Stirling Communications International. It was sold at convenience stores, supermarkets, and through door-to-door delivery every Monday when the print edition ended in September 2022.

Founded as The Sunday Herald on May 12, 1946, it was originally a tabloid newspaper with, in Stirling's words, "a little something for everyone."

After Stirling's CJON-TV (now better known as NTV) came on the air, the publication's focus gradually shifted towards celebrity and entertainment features, as it switched to a magazine format. The Herald frequently cross-promoted sister media outlets NTV and OZFM.

On September 21, 2022, the Newfoundland Herald announced it would be closing, but that its website would remain active for archival purposes. The final print edition was for the week of September 25 to October 1, 2022.
