= Clin d'œil =

French arts festival

Clin d'œil (from French: "Wink") is an international arts festival in sign languages founded in 2003, taking place every two years in July for four days in Reims, France. Various artistic disciplines are represented: theater, dance, cinema, visual arts, street performances, and others.

== History ==
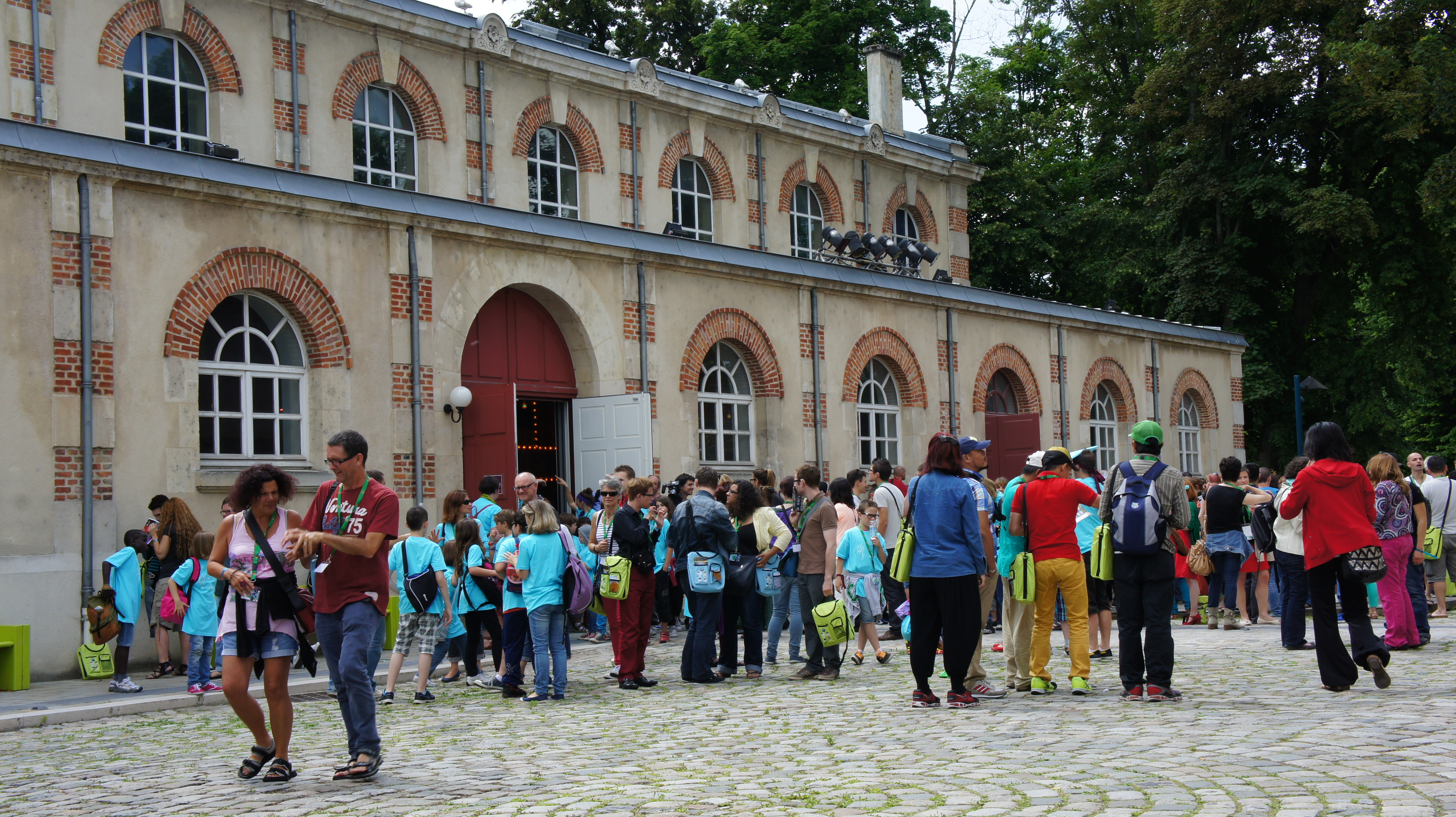
The crowd in front of the Manège

The CinéSourds association created this festival in 2003 in order to "to defend the creation and expression of artists in sign language". Three foreign artists were invited to the first experimental event: the Swedish director Lars Otterstedt, the Norwegian director Con Melhum, and the Italian actor Giuseppe Giuranna. For the first festival, about 400 people attended. But it was in 2005 that the Clin d'œil festival really began in full.

In its fifth edition in 2011, more than 6000 visitors participated in the various events. For its tenth anniversary in 2013, the festival welcomed more than 3000 people per day and 275 artists. In 2015, about 4500 festival-goers per day enjoyed an international program of theater and film.

The Clin d'œil Festival provides an overview of the international landscape of Deaf culture accessible to all audiences. It offers performances in sign language: one man shows, plays, dance, street theater, a short film competition, artistic and professional exhibitions, and others.

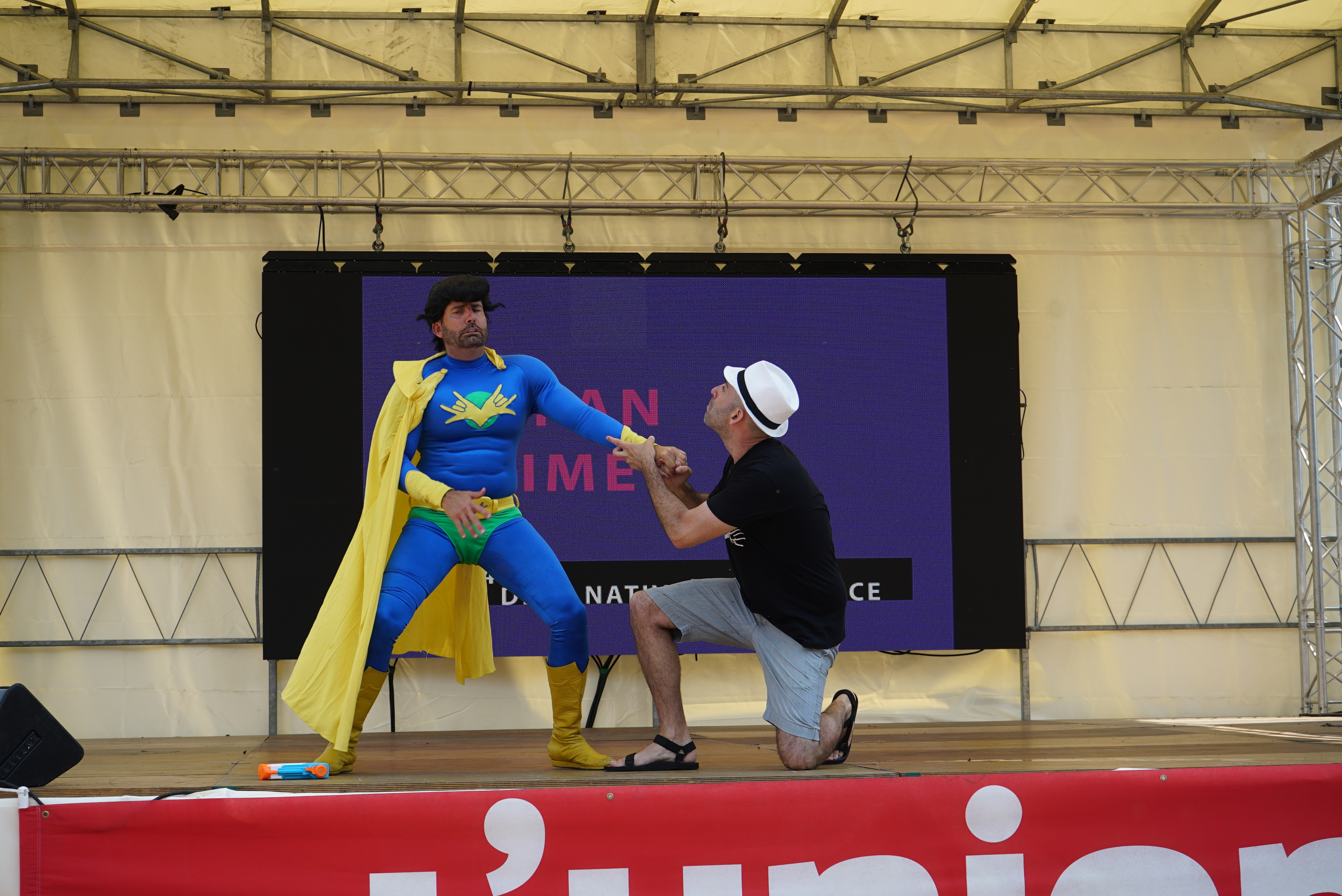
A SuperDeafy stage performance at Clin d'œil 2015

The festival is held every two years in Reims. Each edition honors a country outside the European Union.

David de Keyzer is the festival's artistic director.

== Featured guest countries ==
- 2007: Russia
- 2009: Australia
- 2011: United States
- 2013: Japan
- 2015: Mexico
- 2017: Brazil

In 2024, the guest country was supposed to be Israel, but due to the political situation, no country was designated as invited.
