= Metacinema =

Self-reflexive mode of filmmaking

Metacinema, also meta-cinema, is a mode of filmmaking in which the film informs the audience that they are watching a work of fiction. Metacinema often references its own production, working against narrative conventions that aim to maintain the audience's suspension of disbelief. Elements of metacinema include scenes where characters discuss the making of the film or where production equipment and facilities are shown. It is analogous to metafiction in literature.

== History ==
Metacinema can be identified in art cinema of the 1960s such as 8½ (Federico Fellini, 1963) or The Passion of Anna (Ingmar Bergman, 1969), and in the self-reflexive filmmaking of the French New Wave in films such as Contempt (Jean-Luc Godard, 1963) and Day for Night (François Truffaut, 1973). Other examples include F for Fake (Orson Welles, 1973) and Through the Olive Trees (Abbas Kiarostami, 1994).

Community (2009–2015) is a sitcom which has elements of metacinema, particularly through the character of Abed Nadir (Danny Pudi) who makes comments about himself and his friends being in a sitcom, such as commenting that they are in a bottle episode in the bottle episode: "Cooperative Calligraphy" (Series 2: Episode 8), and the episode "Messianic Myths and Ancient Peoples" (Series 2: Episode 5) consists of Abed making his own metacinema film.

== Types of metacinema ==
Metacinema encompasses several distinct subgenres and stylistic approaches that draw attention to the filmmaking process.

=== Film within a film ===
This structural approach, closely related to the artistic concept of mise en abyme, features a secondary movie embedded within the primary storyline. The inner film often comments on, parodies, or directly parallels the outer narrative, forcing viewers to navigate multiple layers of fiction simultaneously. In films like Singin' in the Rain (1952), The Purple Rose of Cairo (1985), Blow Out (1981), Tropic Thunder (2008), and Argo (2012). The boundary between the internal movie and the overarching universe frequently dissolves, drawing attention to the artificial construction of cinematic tropes.

=== Films about filmmaking ===
A prominent subgenre of metacinema focuses on the production of a movie itself, integrating the behind-the-scenes process into the primary narrative. By depicting directors, actors, and crew members navigating the chaotic process of a film shoot, these works blur the line between the reality of the characters and the fictional film they are creating and actively expose the technical, logistical, and emotional machinery required to manufacture cinematic illusion. Classic examples include Man with a Movie Camera (1929), 8½ (1963), Day for Night (1973), and Blow Out (1981).

=== Fourth wall breaks ===
Metacinema frequently employs the breaking of the fourth wall, a technique where characters explicitly acknowledge their fictional nature or the presence of the audience. This can occur through direct address (where a character speaks straight into the camera lens) or by characters manipulating the physical film medium itself, such as rewinding the narrative, referencing the script, or interacting with the film's soundtrack. Films such as Ferris Bueller's Day Off (1986), Funny Games (1997), The Emperor's New Groove (2000), and Deadpool (2016) use this device to disrupt the audience's passive viewing experience and suspend conventional disbelief. Examples of television shows that do this frequently are Community (2009–2017), Rick and Morty (2013–present), BoJack Horseman (2014–2020), and Fleabag (2016–2019).

=== Mockumentary ===
One of the most prominent forms is the mockumentary, a genre that adopts the stylistic conventions and format of a documentary to depict fictional events. By parodying real-world non-fiction filmmaking techniques, mockumentaries consistently remind the viewer of the artificiality of the cinematic form.
