= The Great Canadian Comic Books =

External videos
- "The Great Canadian Comic Books" Nelvana documentary (16mm 1971), YouTube

The Great Canadian Comic Books is a 1971 book by Peter Martin Associates. It was written by Nelvana founders Michael Hirsh and Patrick Loubert, with partner Clive Smith as designer and illustrator. It looks at the "Canadian Whites" series of comic books made during World War II, with some focus on Nelvana of the Northern Lights, the genre's first superheroine, and Johnny Canuck, as well as their publisher, Bell Features. It was accompanied by a two-year travelling tour of the art, the National Gallery of Canada's "Comic Art Traditions in Canada, 1941–45".

The book's copyright was originally vested in Nelvana Limited. With the permission of Corus Entertainment, the current copyright holder, Roy Thomas reprinted The Great Canadian Comic Books in its entirety in Alter Ego in August 2007. Along with the book, there was a 23-minute documentary with the same story being released in the same year. It can be found online as of June 2021.

== See also ==
- Canadian comics
- Adrian Dingle
- John Bell
