= Canadian Whites =

World War II-era Canada comic books

Golden Age of Canadian Comic Books
- Time span: 1941 – 1947

Canadian Whites are World War II-era comic books published in Canada that feature colour covers with black-and-white interiors. Notable characters include Nelvana of the Northern Lights, (Note: the first female Canadian superhero, predating Wonder Woman by several months) Johnny Canuck, Brok Windsor, and Canada Jack. The period has been called the Golden Age of Canadian comics.

== Background ==
For the most part, the "Whites" have colour covers with interiors printed in black ink on white paper, although there are a handful of comics with colour interiors. They proliferated in Canada after the War Exchange Conservation Act restricted the importation of non-essential goods from the United States into Canada, including fiction periodicals. For this reason, this era is sometimes referred to as the "WECA period" and the comics are sometimes referred to as "WECA books."

At least four companies took advantage of the situation by publishing comics in Canada, sometimes using imported scripts. Anglo-American Publishing of Toronto and Maple Leaf Publishing in Vancouver started publishing in March 1941. Later, two other Toronto-based publishers joined in: Hillborough Studios that August, and Bell Features (originally Commercial Signs of Canada) in September.

Some of the more notable "Whites" creators included Ed Furness, Ted McCall, Adrian Dingle, Gerald Lazare, Jon St. Ables, Fred Kelly, and Leo Bachle, all of whom would later be inducted into the Joe Shuster Award's Canadian Comic Book Creator Hall of Fame.

This period has been called the Golden Age of Canadian comics, but the age of the "Whites" did not last long. When the trade restrictions were lifted following World War II, (Note: the import prohibition was repealed, effective August 1, 1944, but foreign exchange controls effectively prevented American comics from returning until the end of the war. The prohibition was revived in 1947 and continued until the end of 1950.) comic books from the United States were once again able to flow across the border.

== Influence and legacy ==
In their depictions of heroic positive role models, the Canadian Whites served an important propaganda function for Canadian readers during the war years.

The animation studio Nelvana took its name from Adrian Dingle's creation, and one of the studio's first productions was a documentary about the Canadian Whites, The Great Canadian Comic Books.

The rediscovery of these comics by a new generation in the 1970s inspired a slew of new Canadian superheroes over the next decades, including everything from obscure fanzines, to webcomics, to graphic novels by bestselling authors like Margaret Atwood and Ken Steacy's War Bears.

The 2014 documentary Lost Heroes: The Untold Story of Canadian Superheroes began by covering this era.

== See also ==
- Golden Age of Comic Books
