= List of Golden Age comics publishers =

The Golden Age of Comic Books was a period in the history of American comic books, generally thought of as lasting from the late 1930s until the late 1940s or early 1950s. During this time, modern comic books were first published and enjoyed a surge of popularity; the archetype of the superhero was created and defined; and many of the most famous superheroes debuted.

Comics packagers, often operated by notable artists such as Will Eisner and Jack Binder, also formed during this time, to supply cheaply produced material to the burgeoning comics industry.

This list ends in the mid-1950s, when many publishers went out of business due to the scapegoating of comics by psychiatrist Fredric Wertham and Senator Estes Kefauver, and the creation of the self-censoring body the Comics Code Authority in 1954. The debut of the new superhero the Flash in 1956 is generally considered the beginning of the Silver Age of Comic Books.

The following is a list of Golden Comics publishers.

== List ==
Of the Golden Age American comic book publishers on this list, only ten continued to publish comic books after 1960, and only three of them are still currently in business:

- American Comics Group (1939–1967)
- Crestwood Publications (1940–1968)
- Gilberton (1941–1971)
- Dell Comics (1929–1974)
- Fawcett Comics (1939–1953, 1958–1980)
- Charlton Comics (1940–1986)
- Harvey Comics (1939–1994)
- National Allied Publications, Inc. (later DC Comics, 1934–present)
- MLJ Comics (later Archie Comics, 1939–present)
- Timely Comics (later Marvel Comics, 1939–present)

== Alphabetical list of American Golden Age publishers ==
- Ace Magazines (1940–1956) Imprint: Ace Periodicals
- Ajax/Farrell (1952–1958) — part of Farrell Publications. Imprint: Four Star Publications
- All-American Publications (1938–1946) — taken over by National Comics Publications
- American Comics Group (1939–1967)
- Archie Comics (1939–present)
- Atlas Comics (1951–1957) — previously Timely Comics, became Marvel Comics
- Aviation Press (1944–1946)
- Avon (1945–present) — also known as Avon Periodicals; continued on publishing novels after the 1950s
- Cambridge House Publishers (1945–1945)
- Centaur Publications (1938–1942) — acquired the assets of Ultem Publications
- Charlton Comics (1940–1986)
- Columbia Comics (1940–1949)
- Comic Media (1952–1954)
- Comics Magazine Company (1936–1957) — assets acquired by Ultem Publications
- Crestwood Publications (1940–1968) — later known as Prize Comics
- David McKay Publications (1937–1950)
- DC Comics (1934–present) — founded as National Allied Publications, Inc.
- Decker (1957–1957)
- Dell Comics (1929–1974)
- D.S. Publishing (1947-1950)
- Eastern Color Printing (1928–1955) — continued on as a printer from 1955 until 2002
- EC Comics (1944–1956) — continued to publish Mad magazine
- Farrell Publications (1940–1958) — numerous imprints
- Fawcett Comics (1939–1980) — canceled its original comics line in 1953 after National Comics Publications v. Fawcett Publications lawsuit
- Fiction House (1938–1954)
- Fox Feature Syndicate (1939–1951)
- Frank Z. Temerson (1939–1941; 1943–1946; 1950?) — imprints include Ultem Publications (1937–1938), Brookwood Publications (1939–1940), Tem Publishing, Nita Publishing, Helnit Publishing (1939–1941); Et-Es-Go Magazines, Continental Magazines (1943–1946) and possibly Continental Publications (1950); acquired assets of Chesler Publications and the Comics Magazine Company in 1937; Temerson assets acquired by Centaur Publications in 1938; Temerson assets temporarily acquired by Holyoke Publishing in 1942–1943
- Gilberton (1941–1971)
- Great Comics Publications (1941–1942)
- Green Publishing (1945–1946, 1952–1957)
- Harry "A" Chesler Comics (1937–1946) — also known as Harry A. Chesler Feature Syndicate. Imprints: Dynamic Publications, Home Guide Publications, Magazine Press
- Harvey Comics (1939–1994) — founded as Worth Carnahan Comics, whose imprints under Carnahan is Worth Publishing, Bilbara Publishing, Hit Publishing
- Hillman Periodicals (1948–1961) — continued on publishing magazines from 1953 until 1961
- Holyoke Publishing (1942–1946) — acquired assets of Helnit and (temporarily) Fox; lost Helnit assets to successor Et-Es-Go Magazines
- Humor Publications/Current Books (1944–1948) — Ace Magazines imprint.
- Key Publications imprints: Aragon Magazines, Gillmor Magazines, Medal Comics, Media Publications, S. P. M. Publications, Stanmor Publications, and Timor Publications) (1951–1956)
- Lev Gleason Publications (1939–1955) — also known as Comic House Publications
- Magazine Enterprises (1943–1958)
- Mainline Publications (1953–1956)
- Marvel Comics (1939–present) — known as Timely Comics 1939 – c. 1950 and Atlas Comics c. 1950 – c. 1957, with periods of no particular brand identity
- Master Comics (1951–1955)
- Pix-Parade (1949-1952)
- Mikeross Publications (1953–1954)
- Narrative Publishers (1944)
- Nedor Comics (1939–1956) — also known as Standard Comics, Better Comics, and Thrilling Comics
- Nesbit (1955–1955)
- Novack Publishing Company (1945–1945)
- Novelty Press (1940–1949) — also known as Premium Service Co., Novelty Publications, and Premier Group
- P.L. Publishing (1951) - Printed in Canada, but compiled and sold in the USA.
- Orbit Publications (1945–1955) — also known as Orbit Comics and Orbit-Wanted
- Quality Comics (1939–1956)
- Reston Publications (1955–1955)
- Rural Home Publications (1944–1945) — group of loosely tied fly-by-night publishers using prepackaged material, many using black market supplies of paper at the end of World War II; mutual tie-ins unclear. Enwil listed as copyright publisher. Some titles continued by Orbit Publications and others by Charlton Comics.
- Spark Publications (1944–1946)
- St. John Publications (1947–1967) — continued on publishing magazines from 1958 until 1967
- Star Publications (1949–1954) — acquired assets of Novelty Press. Founded by noted cover artist L.B. Cole
- Street & Smith Comics (1940–1949)
- Timely Comics (1939–c.1950) — evolved into Atlas Comics and subsequently Marvel Comics
- Toby Press (1949–1955) — also known as Toby Comics
- Trojan Magazines (1949–1955) — evolved from 1940s pulp magazine publisher owned by Harry Donenfeld and Mike Estrow. Imprints: Pix-Parade (1949–1952), Ribage (1953–1954), Stanhall (1951–1954)
- United Feature (1919–present) — division of United Feature Syndicate; after ending the United Feature comics line in 1954, some United Feature titles were continued by St. John Publications, and later by Dell Comics
- Youthful (1949–1954) — also known as Youthful Magazines
- Ziff-Davis Comics (1927–present) — continued on publishing magazines after 1953

== Alphabetical list of non-American Golden Age publishers ==
- Anglo-American Publishing (Canada) (1941–1951)
- Bell Features (Canada) (1941–1953)
- Cardal Publishing (U.K.) (c. 1947–c. 1949)
- DC Thomson (Scotland) (1905–present) — established in 1905, began publishing "funny books" like The Dandy and The Beano in 1937–1938
- Dargaud (France) (1936–present) — publisher of Lucky Luke
- Dupuis (Belgium) (1922–present) — publisher of Spirou
- Frew Publications (Australia) (1948–present) — publisher of The Phantom
- Hillborough Studios (Canada) (1941–1942)
- Horwitz (Australia) (1950–1966) — reprinted Marvel comics
- L. Miller & Son, Ltd. (U.K.) (1943–1966)
- Le Lombard (Belgium) (1946–present) — publisher of The Smurfs
- Maple Leaf Publishing (Canada) (1941–1946)
- O Globo (Brazil) (1929 - 1952) -reprinted American comics, replaced by Rio Gráfica e Editora
- Rio Gráfica e Editora (Brazil) (From 1950) Ran into the Silver and Bronze Age. Created original stories for many American heroes like Black Rider, Mandrake, Rocky Lane and Straight Arrow.
- Superior Publishers Limited (Canada) (1945–1956) — reprinted American comics

== Packagers ==
- Bernard Baily Studio (1943–1946)
- Eisner & Iger / S. M. Iger Studio — (c. 1936–1955) — Eisner & Iger operated from c. 1936–1939; Iger operated from 1940 to 1955
- Funnies Inc./Lloyd Jacquet Studios (1939–c. 1958)
- Harry "A" Chesler (c. 1935–c. 1953) — also operated as a publisher
- Jack Binder Studio (1942–1946)
- L. B. Cole studio (1942–1948)
- Sangor Studio (1939–1948)
