= Doris Slater =

- Born: March 6, 1917; Chatham
- Died: June 26, 1964
- Occupation: Cartoonist
- Spouse: Larry Cross
- Awards: Joe Shuster Award (hall of fame); Canadian Comic Book Hall of Fame (2015)

Doris Slater Titus (March 6, 1917 – June 26, 1964) was a Canadian cartoonist, painter, and art teacher. She was the first female cartoonist in the Canadian comic book industry.

== Life and career ==
Doris Slater was born on March 6, 1917 on a farm near Chatham, Ontario. Her family moved to Toronto in 1929, where she attended Oakwood Collegiate High School and the Ontario College of Art, graduating from the latter in 1939.

Through her older sister's marriage, Slater became sister-in-law to Ted McCall of the Anglo-American Publications Company. In 1941, Slater and McCall - using the shared pseudonym MacDuff - collaborated on a character called "Pat the Air Cadet", a female pilot who fought Nazis, for Grand Slam Comics. The next year she wrote and drew her own feature, "Martin Blake, Animal King", for 3 Aces Comics. In 1944, she created a comic book version of Patricia Joudry's CFRB radio show Penny's Diary, about the stereotypical misfortunes of a teenage girl, for Active Comics from Bell Features. She also illustrated two Baby Bee’s children's books by Byng Whitteker. Slater's work in the Canadian comic book industry ended with its post-World War II slump.

In 1944, Slater married Russ Titus, a Canadian singer and actor who later worked under the name Larry Cross. They had two children, a son and a daughter. Their marriage ended and he moved his career to London in 1950.

She and her children moved to Brantford, Ontario, in 1952, where she became an art teacher at the Brantford Collegiate Institute & Vocational School. In 1960, she moved to Ottawa to teach at the High School of Commerce. During these years her she painted abstract works often inspired by cubism and began experimenting with unusual materials in her work such as birdseed and her own bathwater.

== Death and legacy ==
Doris Slater was killed on June 26, 1964, in a head-on collision while driving in a hailstorm near Stittsville, Ontario.

Slater was inducted into the Joe Shuster Awards Canadian Comic Book Hall of Fame in 2015.
