= Canuck =

Term for a Canadian

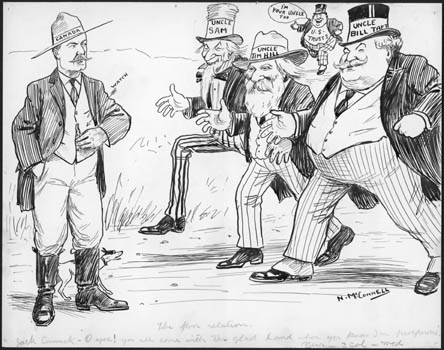
An editorial cartoon, c. 1910, portraying Johnny Canuck

Canuck (/kəˈnʌk/ kə-NUK) is a slang term for a Canadian, though there are numerous contextual variations on the word's meaning. A variety of theories have been postulated for the etymological origins of the term. The term Kanuck is first recorded in 1835 as a Canadianism, originally referring to French Canadians. By the 1850s, the spelling with a "C" became predominant. Today, many Canadians and others use Canuck as a mostly affectionate term for any Canadian.

Johnny Canuck is a folklore hero who was created as a political cartoon in 1869 and was later re-invented as a Second World War action hero in 1942. The Vancouver Canucks, a professional ice hockey team in the National Hockey League (NHL), has used a version of "Johnny Canuck" as their team logos.

The Canadian military has used the term colloquially for several projects: Operation Canuck, the Avro Canada CF-100 Canuck and the Fleet 80 Canuck.

Captain Canuck is a Canadian comic book superhero who first appeared in Captain Canuck #1 (July 1975). The series was the first successful Canadian comic book since the collapse of the nation's comic book industry following World War II.

== Origin ==
Historically the etymology was labelled as unclear, with its most likely origins according to the 2017 Dictionary of Canadianisms on Historical Principles, 2nd edition being:

- kanata, "village" (see name of Canada)
- Canada + -uc (Algonquian noun suffix)
- Kanaka, derived from the Hawaiian Kanaka.

According to The Etymology of Canuck by Jacob Adler with contributions from Mitford M. Mathews, the word Canuck connects back to the term kanaka, which is defined as someone indigenous to Hawaii. The term spread beginning in the 1800s however, when kanaka acquired a racist connotation, and was used to refer to Polynesians with darker skin tones negatively.

== Usage and examples ==
Canadians use Canuck as an affectionate or merely descriptive term for their nationality.

If familiar with the term, most citizens of other nations, including the United States, also use it affectionately, though there are individuals who may use it as a derogatory term.

=== History ===
- Canuck also has the derived meanings of a Canadian pony (rare) and a French-Canadian patois (very rare).
- Johnny Canuck, a personification of Canada who appeared in early political cartoons of the 1860s resisting Uncle Sam's bullying. Johnny Canuck was revived in 1942 by Leo Bachle to defend Canada against the Nazis. The Vancouver Canucks have adopted a personification of Johnny Canuck on their alternate hockey sweater.
- As the historical nickname for three Canadian-built aircraft from the 20th century: the Curtiss JN-4C training biplane, with some 1,260 airframes built; the Avro CF-100 jet fighter; and the Fleet 80 Canuck two-seat side-by-side trainer.
- One of the first uses of Canuck – in the form of Kanuk – specifically referred to Dutch Canadians as well as the French.
- Operation Canuck was the designated name of a British SAS raid led by a Canadian captain, Buck McDonald in January 1945.
- The Canuck letter became a focal point during the US 1972 Democratic primaries, when a letter published in the Manchester Union Leader implied Democratic contender Senator Edmund Muskie was prejudiced against French-Canadians. He soon ended his campaign as a result. The letter was later discovered to have been written by the Nixon campaign in an attempt to sabotage Muskie.
- A brand of firearms engineered and distributed by O'Dell Engineering Ltd since 2014 includes the Canuck 1911, Canuck Over Under and Canuck Shotgun.

=== Media ===
- In the opening of Thornton Wilder's 1938 play Our Town, Polish and "Canuck families" are mentioned as living on the outskirts of the prototypical 1901 New Hampshire town.
- In 1975, in comics by Richard Comely, Captain Canuck is a super-agent for Canadians' security, with Redcoat and Kebec being his sidekicks. (Kebec is claimed to be unrelated to Capitaine Kébec of a French-Canadian comic published two years earlier.) Captain Canuck had enhanced strength and endurance thanks to being bathed in alien rays during a camping trip. The captain was reintroduced in the mid-1990s, and again in 2004.
- The Marvel Comics character Wolverine is often referred to affectionately as "the Ol' Canucklehead" due to his Canadian heritage.
- Soviet Canuckistan was an insult used by Pat Buchanan in response to Canada's reaction to racial profiling by US Customs agents.

=== Sport ===
- The Canada national rugby union team (men's) is officially nicknamed Canucks.
- The Canucks rugby Club, playing in Calgary since 1968.
- The Crazy Canucks, Canadian alpine ski racers who competed successfully on the World Cup circuit in the 1970s.
- The Vancouver Canucks professional ice hockey team, with their former goaltender, Roberto Luongo, having a depiction of Johnny Canuck on his goalie mask. The full body Johnny Canuck was then updated in 2009 by graphic designer Evan Biswanger.
- During the Vancouver 2010 Olympics official Canadian Olympic gear bore the term.

== See also ==
- Canadian folklore
- Canadian identity
- Canadian values
- Canadianism
