= Commander Steel (Anglo-American) =

- Grand Slam Comics Vol. 3 #9 (33)

Publication information
- Publisher: Anglo-American Publishing
- First appearance: Grand Slam Comics Vol. 3 #9 (33), Aug 1944
- Created by: Ted McCall and Ed Furness

In-story information
- Alter ego: Jack Steel
- Abilities: Super-Strength and Durability

Commander Steel is a fictional character and a superhero. He first appeared in Grand Slam Comics Vol. 3 #9 (33), August 1944, published by Anglo-American Publishing.

== Character history ==
Injured at one of the Battles of El Alamein, he was rescued by a scientist and given the “Elixir of Power”, which granted him superhuman strength and durability. He served in the International Police Service during the war.

== Powers and abilities ==
Commander Steel had superhuman strength and durability.

== See also ==
- Anglo-American Publishing
- Canadian comics
