= Iron Man (Canadian comics) =

Publication information
- Publisher: Maple Leaf Publishing
- First appearance: Better Comics #1 (March 1941)
- Created by: Vernon Miller

In-story information
- Alter ego
- Abilities: Super strength, indestructibility, amphibiousness

Iron Man is a Canadian fictional character, created by cartoonist Vernon Miller for Maple Leaf Publishing. A superhero, the character debuted in the first issue of Better Comics in March 1941, a colour title, unlike most of the other Canadian comic books at the time which were printed in black-and-white and known as "Canadian Whites".

Although he lacked a distinct Canadian identity, Iron Man was the first Canadian superhero and, like many comic book heroes of the time, he fought against the Nazis. He predates the better-known Marvel Comics character by 22 years and bears no likeness to that Iron Man. Superficially, he resembles the amphibious Namor, the Sub-Mariner, who had debuted two years earlier.

== Fictional history ==
Iron Man is the last member of a mutated human subspecies that lived in the South Seas, having survived a devastating earthquake which eradicated his people. He lives alone in a sunken palace until roused from his mourning by World War II. After being summoned by two children and an adult named the Major, he throws in his lot with the Allies, viewing the Nazis as no better than pirates, whom he also hates.

== Special powers ==
Iron Man is amphibious and has superhuman strength.

== See also ==
- Canadian comics
- Nelvana of the Northern Lights, another early Canadian superhero
