= Better Comics =

Better Comics may refer to:

- Better Comics, an imprint of the American comic-book publisher Standard Comics
- Better Comics, a comic book published by the Canadian publisher Maple Leaf Publishing
- Better Publications, an alternate name for pulp-magazine and paperback-book publisher Ned Pines’ company Thrilling Publications
