= Doc Stearn...Mr. Monster =

Mr. Monster
- Cover to Doc Stern...Mr. Monster #1 (1986) by Michael T. Gilbert.

Publication information
- Publisher: Bell Features; Pacific Comics; Eclipse Comics; Dark Horse Comics; Tundra Publishing; Caliber Comics; Image Comics; Cost Of Paper Comics
- First appearance: Vanguard Illustrated #7 (Pacific Comics, July 1984)
- Created by: Fred Kelly

In-story information
- Full name: Doc Stearn

Doc Stearn... Mr. Monster is a Canadian comic book character featuring a superhero created by Fred Kelly during the 1940s but, most recently published by Dark Horse Comics in stories written by Michael T. Gilbert.

== Publication history ==
Mr. Monster was created by Fred Kelly and appeared in 1940s Canadian comic books (Triumph Comics #31, 1946, and Super-Duper Comics #3, 1947). After trademarking the name "Mr. Monster", Gilbert heavily revised the character, adding a horror/humor hybrid which often featured heavy satire of both the horror genre and superhero comics in general. The revised character first appeared in Pacific Comics Vanguard Illustrated #7, dated July 1984, but shortly afterwards Pacific folded, with its assets being taken over by Eclipse Comics. They offered Gilbert the opportunity to give the character a title of his own, initially planned as a January 1985 one-shot reprinting and completing the Vanguard storyline. The series would become an ongoing, with Dave Stevens providing a cover for the second issue. Eclipse also published a series of specials starring Mr. Monster, and later a crossover issue pairing him with Airboy.

From 1988 Gilbert left Eclipse, instead taking the character to Dark Horse Comics.

== Reception ==
Reviewing the first issue of the Eclipse series for Amazing Heroes, R.A. Jones felt the issue was missing a final spark despite its excellent art and otherwise solid writing.

Ed Sample was positive about Airboy and Mr. Monster, though he noted Airboy took a less central role than expected.

== Bibliography ==
- Vanguard Illustrated #7 (Pacific Comics), July 1984.
- Doc Stearn...Mr. Monster #1-10 (Eclipse Comics), 1985–1987. Issues 1-5 collected as Mr. Monster: His Books of Forbidden Knowledge Vol. 1 (Marlowe & Company), 1996.
- Mr. Monster's Super Duper Special #1-8 (Eclipse Comics), 1986–1987.
- Airboy #28 (prologue to Airboy and Mr. Monster, Eclipse Comics), August 1987.
- Airboy and Mr. Monster one-shot (Eclipse Comics), August 1987.
- Mighty Mites V.2 #2 (Eternity Comics), September 1987.
- Wacky Squirrel Halloween Adventure Special one-shot (Dark Horse Comics), 1987.
- Dark Horse Presents #14, 20, 28, 33 (Dark Horse Comics), 1988-1989.
- Doc Stearn...Mr. Monster #1-8 (Dark Horse Comics), 1988-1990. Collected with revisions as Mr. Monster: Origins (Graphitti Designs), 1996.
- Mr. Monster Attacks #1-3 (Tundra Publishing), 1992.
- Mr. Monster's 3-D Triple Threat one-shot (Atlas), 1993.
- Penthouse Max #3 (Penthouse), 1996.
- Mr. Monster Presents: Crack-a-Boom! #1-3 (Caliber Comics), 1997.
- Mr. Monster Vs. Gorzilla one-shot (Image Comics), 1998.
- Mr. Monster's Gal Friday Kelly #1-3 (Image Comics), 2000.
- Mr. Monster: His Books of Forbidden Knowledge Vol. 0 (TwoMorrows Publishing), 2001. Reprints all Mr. Monster stories from Dark Horse Presents (v. 1), as well as material from Crack-a-Boom! #s 1 and 2, Hero Illustrated #11, Trencher X-Mas Bites Special #1, and Mr. Monster Attacks! #2, along with new material.
- Mr. Monster: Worlds War Two (Atomeka Press), 2004. Reprints Penthouse Max #3.
- Mr. Monster: Who Watches the Garbagemen? (Atomeka), 2005. Reprints stories from Mr. Monster (Eclipse) #3 and 6, Mr. Monster Attacks! #1, and Mr. Monster's Gal Friday Kelly #3, along with new material.
- Dark Horse Presents vol. 2 #1-3, 17, 27-30, 33-35 (Dark Horse Comics), 2011-2014.
- YEET Presents #34 and #36 (Cost Of Paper Comics), 2020.
