= Michael de Adder =

Canadian cartoonist (born 1967)

Michael de Adder CM
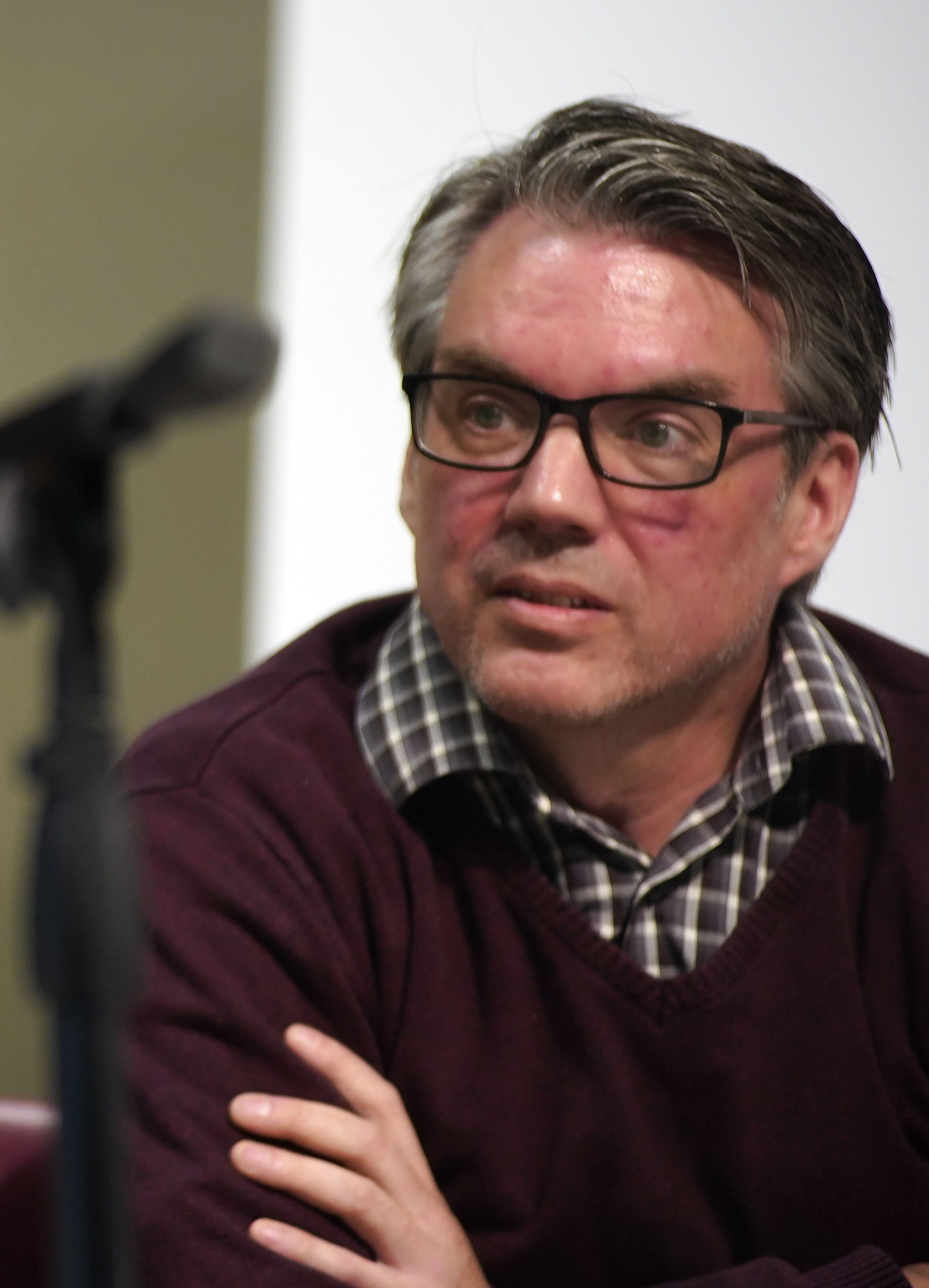
- Michael de Adderin 2019
- Born: 25 May 1967 (age 59); Moncton, New Brunswick, Canada
- Occupation: Editorial cartoonist
- Children: Two
- Website: deadder.net

Michael de Adder CM (born 25 May 1967) is a Canadian editorial cartoonist and caricaturist.

== Early life and education ==
Born in Moncton, he attended Riverview High School. He then graduated from Mount Allison University with a Bachelor of Fine Arts in 1991. While at Mount Allison, he began drawing cartoons for The Argosy, the school's student newspaper.

== Career ==
De Adder began his career working for The Coast, a Halifax-based alternative weekly, drawing a popular comic strip called Walterworld which lampooned the then-current mayor of Halifax, Walter Fitzgerald. This led to freelance jobs at The Chronicle-Herald and The Hill Times in Ottawa, Ontario.

In 2000, he began working at The Daily News of Halifax until its closure in 2008.

A de Adder cartoon

His work appears regularly in the National Post, Maclean's, The Chronicle-Herald and the Moncton Times & Transcript. His work is syndicated in North America through Artizans.com. He continues to be a weekly contributor to The Hill Times as well as to Canadian Metro dailies. He draws approximately ten cartoons weekly and, at over a million readers per day, is considered the most read cartoonist in Canada.

He is a past president of the Association of Canadian Editorial Cartoonists and is on the board of the Cartoonists Rights Network, International.

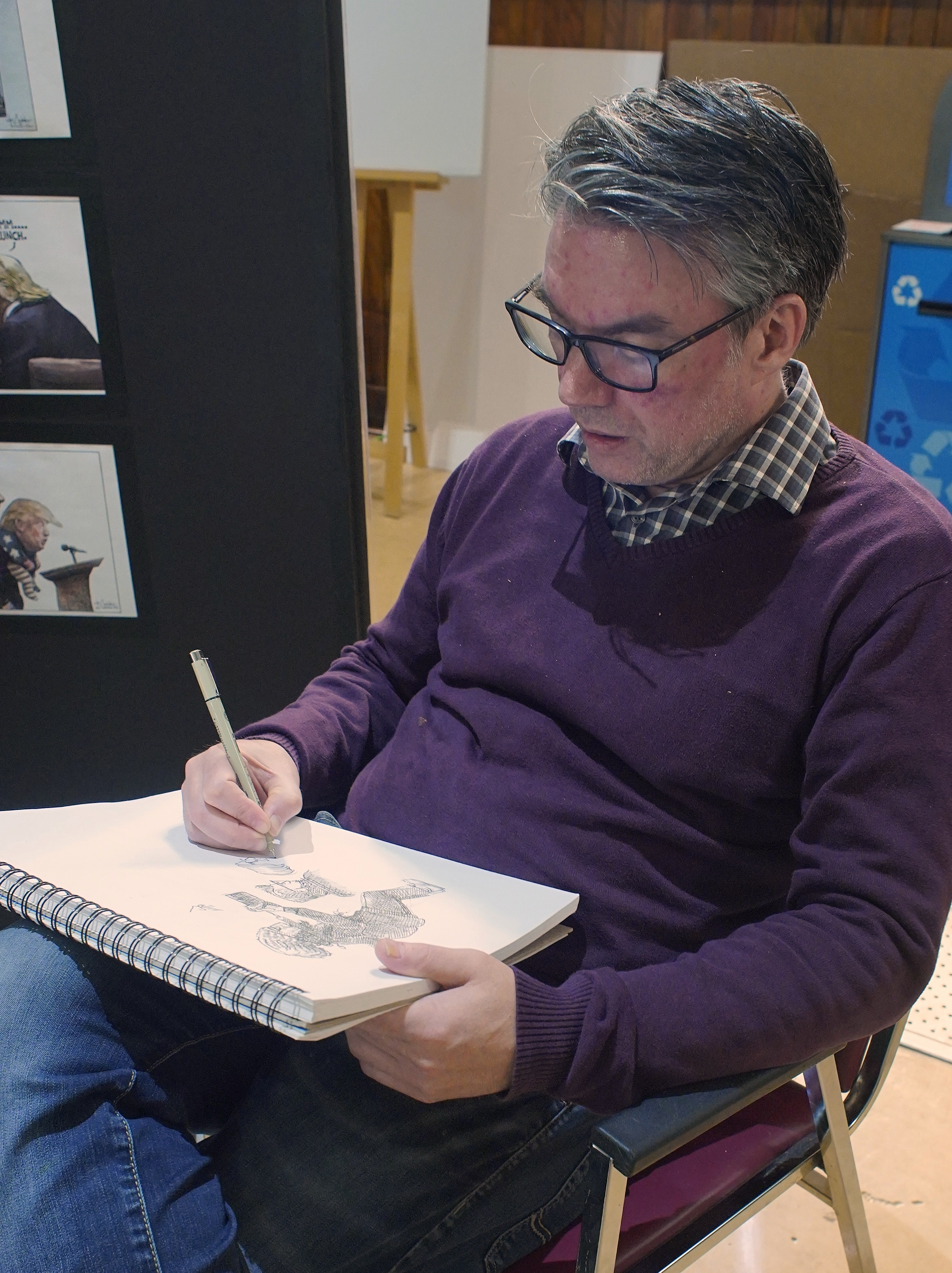
Michael de Adder, invited exhibitor and speaker at 1001 visages in October 2019

In June 2019, de Adder had his freelance contract with Brunswick News, Inc. (BNI) terminated following his drawing of a cartoon criticising U.S. President Donald Trump's border policies. The cartoon showed President Trump playing golf and ignoring the dead, face down, drowned bodies of two Mexican migrants. Brunswick News issued a statement saying that they had not been offered the cartoon, and that the decision to replace de Adder with another cartoonist had been made some weeks previously.

In March 2021, de Adder was hired by The Washington Post. He would leave the Post in January 2024.

On 8 October 2024, de Adder announced on Facebook he was "let go" by the Chronicle Herald after 27 years of working there. This was subsequently confirmed and reported by other media outlets.

== Awards ==
He was nominated for a National Newspaper Award in 2002, 2014, 2015, 2018, and 2021. He was chosen the winner of the National Newspaper Award for Editorial Cartooning for 2020.

He won the Association of American Editorial Cartoonists' Golden Spike Award in 2006 for the best cartoon killed by an editor. De Adder is the 2020 recipient of the Herblock Prize for editorial cartooning.

He was awarded an honorary doctorate by Mount Allison University in May 2020.

He was appointed a Member of the Order of Canada in 2023.

== Publications ==
- deBook. Montreal, Que.: Transcontinental. 2007. ISBN 978-0-9736425-2-0.
- You Might Be from Nova Scotia If …. Lunenburg, N. S.: MacIntyre Purcell Publishing. 2013. ISBN 978-1-927097-39-7.
- dePictions. Halifax, N. S.: Nimbus Publishing. 2013. ISBN 978-1-77108-089-7.
- Drawing Opinions: MacKinnon, DeAdder & More: Cartoons and the Stories that Inspire Them. Halifax, N. S.: Chronicle Herald. 2013. ISBN 978-1-894420-43-3.
- You Might Be from New Brunswick If …. Lunenburg, N. S.: MacIntyre Purcell Publishing. 2014. ISBN 978-1-927097-65-6.
