= Jon St. Ables =

Canadian comics artist

Jon St. Ables, born Jon Stables, (December 23, 1912 – 1999) was a Canadian cartoonist.

== Life and career ==
St. Ables was born in Ulverston in England and emigrated to Winnipeg in Canada when he was 13, preceded by his father and older brother. During World War II, he worked as a painter and sign writer for the shipbuilding industry in Victoria, British Columbia. Shortly after his marriage in 1942 he was hired by Maple Leaf Publishing, where worked as the artist for the Piltdown Pete, Brok Windsor, and Bill Speed cartoon strips, which he signed with the pen name "St. Ables". He eventually took over as art editor from Vernon Miller and became one of the company's top cover artists.

When Maple Leaf folded in 1946, he opened a studio and for a while produced a line of colouring books. In 1950, St. Ables, his wife Esther, and their two sons moved to California. After unsuccessful approaches to The Walt Disney Company, the family moved to Seattle, where St. Ables worked in the art department at Boeing. He retired from Boeing in 1975. Jon St. Ables died in 1999 at age 87. His wife Esther died ten years later at age 94.

In 2006 was St. Ables was inducted into the Joe Shuster Awards Hall of Fame for his contributions to Canadian comics.
