= Anglo-American =

Anglo-American can refer to:

- the Anglosphere (the Anglo-American world)
- Anglo-American, something of, from, or related to Anglo-America
  - the Anglo-Americans demographic group in Anglo-America
- Anglo American plc, a mining company
  - Anglo American Sur, a copper mining company in Chile
- Anglo-American Publishing, Canadian comic book publisher during the World War II era
- Anglo American Racers, an automobile racing team now named All American Racers
- Anglo-American Club Zürich, a former Swiss football club
