= Bedside Press =

Canadian comic book publisher

- Status: Active
- Founded: 2014
- Defunct: November 2019
- Country of origin: Canada
- Distribution: Diamond_Comic_Distributors
- Publication types: Comics
- Official website: bedsidepress.com

Bedside Press was a Canadian comics publishing company active between 2014 and 2019. Founded in 2014, Bedside Press published a diverse range of comic and prose works including anthology collections like The Secret Loves of Geek Girls, and historical reprints such as the adventures of Nelvana of the Northern Lights and Brok Windsor. Bedside Press also published new content by up-and-coming artists/writers, and established creators including Margaret Atwood, Trina Robbins, and Roberta Gregory.

== See also ==
- Canadian comics
