= Adrian Dingle =

Adrian Dingle may refer to:

- Adrian Dingle (artist) (1911–1974), creator of Nelvana of the Northern Lights
- Adrian Dingle (American football) (1977–2022), American football player
