= Ed Furness =

Canadian comic book artist

- Born: 1910 United Kingdom
- Died: 2005 (aged 94–95) Toronto, Ontario, Canada
- Area: Cartoonist
- Awards: Joe Shuster Awards Hall of Fame

Ed Furness (1910–2005) was a Canadian comic book artist associated with the "Canadian Whites", Canadian comic books published during World War II.

Furness, originally from the United Kingdom, grew up in Dunnville, Ontario. Furness graduated from the Ontario College of Art in 1933, and after a few years of working as an illustrator he was hired by Anglo-American Publishing to produce comic book stories for their burgeoning line of comics. In 1941, Furness, along with writer Ted McCall created the character of Freelance for Anglo-American's Freelance Comics. Furness also drew Commander Steel in Grand Slam Comics from 1941 and many other comic book stories, eventually becoming the lead artist for Anglo-American Publishing.

The War Measures Conservation Act ended in 1946, and reopened the distribution of American comic books in Canada again, which led to the end to many Canadian comic book publishers. Anglo-American made one last-ditch effort to distribute their periodicals in the United States in color and failed.

Anglo-American Publishing shut down production in 1956. Furness went on to do commercial art and landscape painting.

Ed Furness was one of five comic book creators inducted into the Joe Shuster Awards Canadian Comic Book Creator Hall of Fame in April 2005.

== See also ==
- Canadian comics
