= Lucky Comics =

Lucky Comics may refer to:

- Lucky Comics (comic book), a Canadian comic-book series published by Maple Leaf Publishing in the 1940s
- Lucky Comics (publisher), a Swiss-based French-language comics publishing house

== See also ==
- Lucky (comic), an issue of Star Wars Tales
