= The Brain (Bell comics) =

Publication information
- Publisher: Bell Features
- First appearance: Active Comics #1
- Created by: Leo Bachle

In-story information
- Alter ego: Gordon Bell
- Abilities: clairvoyance Superhuman strength
The Brain

The Brain is a fictional character created by Leo Bachle for Bell Features, a Canadian comic company in the 1940s, and first appeared in Active Comics #1.

The muscular and often bare-chested Brain's secret identity was dashing, Toronto penthouse-dwelling Gordon Bell who, like the Wizard before him, had a moustache, superhuman strength and the clairvoyant ability to "visualize faraway happenings", the latter powers in his case gained due to a dying wish his father had made to a friendly spirit on a distant French battlefield during World War I.

While he first donned cape, tights and signature black skullcap-mask to battle Nazi agents, his adventures soon took on a more supernatural element, with him battling such inhuman adversaries as the sinister Dr. Coffin's ghoulish creation the Scarlet Zombie and the sadistic skull-faced and bandage-wrapped Mummy Man who possessed psychic powers that were more than a match for his own.

Friend and fellow artist Ross Saakel did a pint-sized parody of Bachle's character for Active Comics called The Noodle, a similarly caped and cowled two-fisted infant superhero complete with diapers and pacifier.
