= Lou Skuce =

Canadian comic strip and editorial cartoonist (1886–1951)

Thomas Lewis "Lou" Skuce
- Advertisement created by Skuce for Maple Leaf Gardens to promote the 1941 OHA Junior Finals between the Toronto Marlboros and the Oshawa Generals, featuring Skuce's two best-known characters "Mr. Fan" and "Lou's Goose"
- Born: Thomas Lewis Skuce; July 6, 1886; Ottawa, Ontario, Canada
- Died: November 20, 1951 (aged 65); Toronto, Ontario, Canada
- Resting place: Beechwood Cemetery, Ottawa
- Education: Lisgar Collegiate Institute
- Occupations: Cartoonist, illustrator, playwright
- Spouse(s): Dorothy Edis (m. 1913; d. 1928) Ruth Kipling Fraser (m. 1932)
- Parent(s): James Skuce; Margaret Boulger

Thomas Lewis Skuce (July 6, 1886 - November 20, 1951), more popularly known as Lou Skuce, was a Canadian comic strip and editorial cartoonist (much of it sports-related), who also appeared widely in movie theatres to entertain while producing cartoons that were projected onto the screen. He also worked in commercial illustration, owning his own studio serving advertising clients in Canada and the United States. During World War II, he also produced material that appeared in the Canadian Whites. When he died, he was referred to as "Canada's Greatest Cartoonist".

== Biography ==
=== Early life ===
Born in Ottawa, Skuce was an accomplished athlete in his youth. As a member of the Britannia Boat House Club, he won seven Canadian and one international paddling championships. He also played rugby with the Ottawa Rough Riders, and ice hockey for at least one season at an amateur club in Winnipeg.

=== Cartooning ===
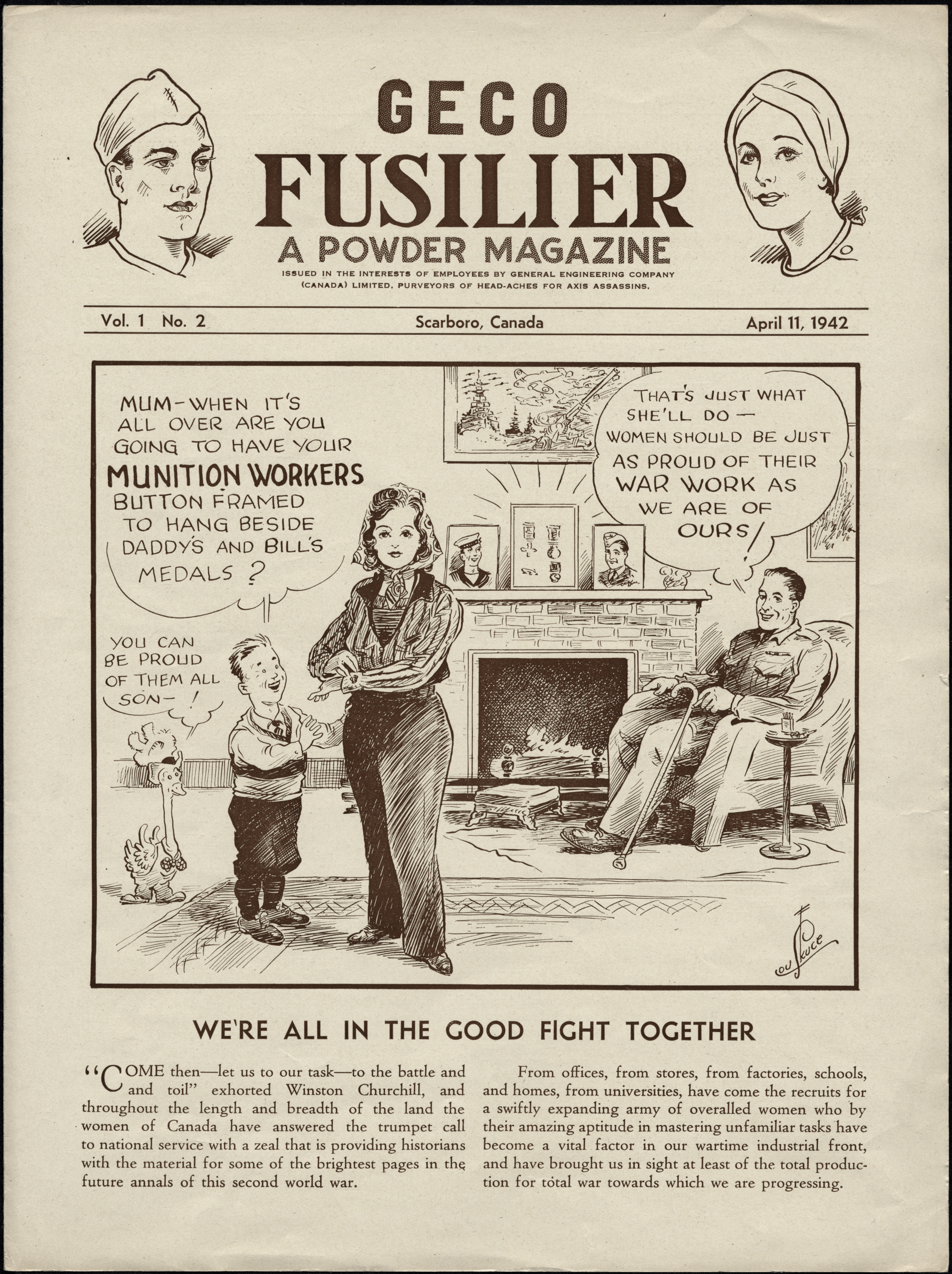
A cartoon by Lou Skuce for the GECO Fusilier.

Skuce became a staff cartoonist at the Ottawa Journal, and later moved to work at the Toronto Sunday World in 1909, working there until 1923. He was the first Canadian cartoonist to draw three-colour front page illustrations, which allowed him to display his fine-art skills. In 1914, Maclean's described him as a rising genius in his field.

In 1923, Skuce moved to New York City to work in animation for Bray Productions, a studio founded by J.R. Bray. He later moved into comic strips, producing Cash and Carrie (similar in format to Tillie the Toiler and Dumb Dora) in 1926, initially for the Merit Newspaper Corporation and later for the Bell Syndicate. After Cash and Carrie was cancelled, he created Mary Ann Gay for United Press Features. At the end of 1928, he returned to Canada to work for The Mail and Empire, and also opened Lou Skuce Studios, which had its offices at the Old Toronto Star Building at 80 King Street West. When The Mail and Empire was acquired by The Globe in 1936, he decided to work strictly freelance.

During World War II, he did work for several comic books produced by Bell Features.

He was also noted for a series of murals that he created for the Toronto Men's Press Club. (Note: now known as the Toronto Press and Media Club) They were shown throughout the Canada by newsreel and various publications, and were notable because Skuce drew them all in the living room of his home, relying solely on experience and memory.

=== Work in the theatre ===
During his time in New York, Skuce became interested in playwriting and acting, and several of his plays (including Bill of 13) were produced. His interest continued afterwards, and at his death he was president of the Toronto chapter of the American Guild of Variety Artists.

=== Work for the Toronto Maple Leafs ===
Skuce had done a cover for a program for the Toronto Maple Leafs during their last season in the Arena Gardens in 1930, and did their first program when they moved to the then-new Maple Leaf Gardens in 1931. His artwork was also used in licensed jig saw puzzles in the 1930s, including one with the 1932 Stanley Cup Champions Maple Leafs.

=== Impact ===
Writing about his style, Toronto Telegram columnist Ted Reeve once said, "Lou [Skuce] was a horse for work. Nothing was too much trouble, no detail in his work too small for him to look after."

Skuce's fame did not last long after his death, as he had focused strictly on cartooning unlike contemporaries such as C.W. Jefferys, and none of the characters he created remained in the public consciousness unlike those by James Simpkins or Doug Wright. Interest in his work revived in the 21st century, and a retrospective of it was shown at the Toronto Comic Arts Festival in 2016.

He was instrumental in pushing for the creation of the Lou Marsh Memorial Trophy, which is awarded annually to Canada's top athlete, whether professional or amateur.
