= Michael T. Gilbert =

American comic book artist and writer (born 1951)

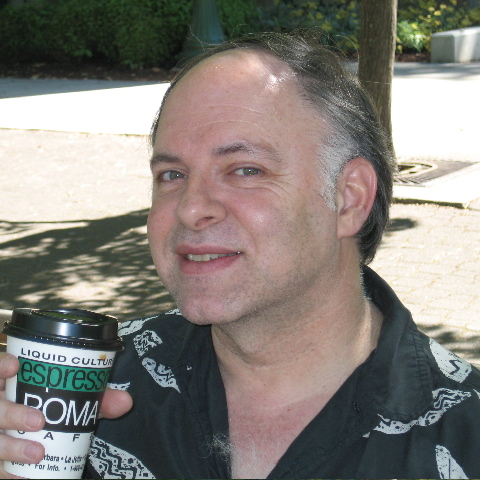
- Born: Michael Terry Gilbert; May 7, 1951 (age 75)
- Areas: Writer, Penciller, Inker, Editor, Letterer, Colourist
- Notable works: Doc Stearn...Mr. Monster
- Awards: Inkpot Award (2014)

Michael Terry Gilbert (born May 7, 1951) is an American comic book artist and writer who has worked for both mainstream and underground comic book companies.

== Education ==
Gilbert attended the State University of New York at New Paltz, graduating in 1973.

== Writing career ==
=== Early work ===
Gilbert's first comic stories were printed in 1973 in his self-published underground, New Paltz Comix. He began drawing for several Star Reach and Kitchen Sink titles; a mix of underground comix (Slow Death, Bizarre Sex, American Splendor issues #4 and #6 by Harvey Pekar) and ground-level comics such as Star*Reach and Quack!. He also did script and artwork on Aardvark's Strange Brew, Tiny Terror Tales and The Wraith (a parody of the famous Will Eisner character The Spirit), and he worked on the celebrated Elric series with P. Craig Russell, a Pacific Comics adaptation of the Michael Moorcock sword and sorcery novels.

=== Mr. Monster ===
Gilbert is most well known for his full-color series called Doc Stearn...Mr. Monster, about a monster fighter. It was published by Eclipse Comics, based on an earlier character created by Fred Kelly from a Canadian comic book, Triumph Comics: #51 (April 1946). Mr. Monster was published throughout the 1980s and on, with new stories appearing in 2016 and on. The character also appeared in graphic novel collections and special issues devoted to reprints of American horror comics of the 1950s. Gilbert writes a column discussing these comics called Mr. Monster's Comic Crypt, beginning in writer/editor Roy Thomas' fanzine Alter Ego (originally as part of the magazine Comic Book Artist). Mr. Monster was later published by Dark Horse Comics.

=== Other works ===
Gilbert contributed to the Spirit Jam, where dozens of notable artists combined on one new The Spirit story, including Eisner himself. Gilbert has also worked on Harlan Ellison's Dream Corridor and Heavy Metal.

He has worked for the two major comic companies, Marvel and DC, producing an issue of Marvel Double-Shot which featured Dr. Strange and for DC worked on Legends of the Dark Knight and, in 2000, wrote and illustrated a Superman graphic novel, Mann & Superman. He has written or drawn characters as diverse as Superman, Batman, Donald Duck, Mickey Mouse and Bart Simpson. He has been a scriptwriter for Disney comics and Egmont Publishing in Denmark since 1989, as has his wife Janet Gilbert. He has written and drawn Batman: Legends of the Dark Knight, which reflects on sixty years of Batman adventures.

=== Awards ===
Gilbert was presented with the Inkpot Award at the 2014 San Diego Comic-Con.

== Bibliography ==
Comics work includes:

- A1 (Atomeka Press)
- Airboy (Eclipse Comics)
- Airboy/Mr. Monster Special (Eclipse Comics)
- Batman: Legends of the Dark Knight (DC Comics)
- Blast! (John Brown Publishing)
- Dark Horse Presents (Dark Horse Comics)
- Doc Stearn... Mr. Monster (Eclipse Comics)
- Elric (Pacific Comics)
- Imagine (Star*Reach)
- Quack (Star*Reach)
- Walt Disney's Comics and Stories (Gladstone)

== Interviews ==
- Douresseau, LJ (2004). Interview with Michael T. Gilbert
- Weiland, Jonah (June 9, 2004). "Michael T. Gilbert Chats With The Irrepressible Mr. Monster". Comic Book Resources. Archived from the original on January 2, 2009.
- Will Scott Interviews Michael T. Gilbert in Sequential Highway August 15, 2012
