= Brok Windsor =

Fictional character

Brok Windsor is a Canadian comic book character, debuting in Maple Leaf Comics' Better Comics Vol. 3 #3 April/May 1944.

== Publication history ==
The character was created, written, and illustrated by John Stables, who was inspired by a Winnipeg adventurer and outdoorsman named Brock Windsor. Later in the series, writer Ted Ross and artist Shirley Fortune assisted in the storytelling.

Brok Windsor debuted in the April/May 1944 issue of Better Comics, published by Maple Leaf Comics. His final appearance was in August 1946 in an issue of Better Comics.

A Kickstarter campaign to republish Brok Windsor for the first time since the original publication was launched in August 2014 by Hope Nicholson. It was successfully funded and a reprint of Brok Windsor's complete adventures (including 9 new pages of artwork by Scott Chantler that are based on a previously unpublished script from 1946) was published in April 2015 by Bedside Press.

== Fictional character ==
Brok Windsor was a Winnipeg doctor and outdoorsman. He possessed the ability to speak multiple languages fluently including French and the fictional First Nations Blackpaw language (likely a variation of Blackfoot). Crashlanding his canoe on the shores of a hidden island in the middle of Lake of the Woods, Brok Windsor looks for a way back home to mainland Canada.

=== Power and Abilities ===
During his adventures on Chaqua, Brok Windsor develops increased strength, speed, and height, eventually matching that of the island's residents. He is also given a uniform, dagger, and "flash-gun" by the residents on his journey.

=== Supporting cast ===
Brok Windsor is joined in his first adventure by the son of the deposed leader of the island, a giant named Torgon. Torgon is a skilled marksman with the flash-gun and expert flyer. Later in their adventures they meet the daughter of an ancient ghost on the island, named Starra. Starra is armed with one of Brok's daggers and eventually accompanies him back to Canada.
