= Leo Bachle =

Canadian comic book artist (1923–2003)

Leo Henry Bachle (November 23, 1923 – May 2003), a.k.a. Les Barker, was a Canadian comic book artist in the era of the Canadian Whites, and later became a comedian.

== Biography ==
Born in Toronto in November 1923, Bachle attended Danforth Collegiate and Technical Institute.

In late 1941, fifteen-year-old Bachle was hired by John Ezrin, the manager of Bell Features in Toronto, Ontario, Canada, to come up with something exciting for the company's growing comic book line. He created the character Johnny Canuck, which debuted in the first issue of Dime Comics in February 1942. In the first Canuck story he confronts Adolf Hitler which helped to propel Dime Comics to becoming the best-selling comic in the Bell line.

Leo became one of Bell's key artists, drawing characters such as Wild Bill, The Invisible Commando, Chip Piper, Southpaw, Super Sub, and The Brain. Bachle's success led to the company to hire a number of new, young artists, including Ross Saakel and Jerry Lazare.

Bachle's character, Johnny Canuck, was considered invaluable to the war effort. It was considered valuable enough to Bell for the company to acquire the copyright from Bachle in December 1944. He later went to New York City, where he did work for Timely Comics, L.B. Cole and Max Gaines.

in 1950, Bachle changed his name to Les Barker and gave up drawing comic books. He became a well-regarded comedian and toured the globe performing his unique comedy act known as Quick on the Draw. The tours included appearances with such entertainers as Liberace, Mickey Rooney, Rich Little and Marlene Dietrich.

In the 1970s, Barker had acting roles in several film and television productions, including Welcome to Blood City, 125 Rooms of Comfort, Class of '44 and Norman Corwin Presents.

Bachle died in Toronto in May 2003 at Scarborough Grace Hospital.

== Legacy ==
In 1995, Canada Post put Johnny Canuck on a postage stamp, which was part of a series with other notable Canadian comic-book heroes.

In 2005, Leo Bachle was among the first batch of Canadian comic book artists inducted into the Joe Shuster Awards Canadian Comic Book Creator Hall of Fame.

== See also ==
- Canadian comics
