= Fred Kelly (comics) =

Canadian comic book writer

Fred Kelly

Frederick George Kelly (September 8, 1921, in Toronto – September 14, 2005, in Owen Sound) was a comic book writer and artist known for his contributions to the "Canadian Whites" era during the Second World War.

Kelly worked for Bell Productions in Toronto, where his creations included the original version of the character "Mr. Monster". He also worked for the Montreal-based "Educational Projects", where he illustrated non-fictional comics about Canadian historical figures.

In 1946, Kelly briefly worked with Damon Runyon on "The Other Half", a comic strip based on Runyon's Prohibition-era stories; however, this project collapsed with Runyon's death. Kelly subsequently left comics, and worked in various fields including medical illustration and real estate.

In 2003, Michael T. Gilbert (whose 1980s creation of "Mr. Monster" was directly inspired by Kelly's work) wrote a tribute to Kelly, and — in the process of researching Kelly — befriended comics historian Robert Pincombe; the next year Pincombe notified Gilbert that he had located Kelly, who (to Gilbert's surprise) was still alive. Kelly subsequently appeared as Gilbert's invited guest at the June 2004 Toronto Comic Con.

Kelly's complete run of "The Adventures of Doc Stearn" and the two issue debut of "Mister Monster" were collected into a single volume through the efforts of comics publisher enthusiast Rachel Richey and independent Canadian publisher RAID Press in 2021.
