= Operation Canuck =

Military operation

Operation Canuck was an operation of World War II conducted by the Canadian Captain Buck McDonald and a small team of Special Air Service troopers in January 1945.

Operating in Northern Italy, the team trained and organized Italian resistance fighters. In what has been characterized as a remarkable event, the team's partisans captured the garrison of Alba, near Turin.
