= Nelvana of the Northern Lights =

- Nelvana, as drawn by Adrian Dingle (1941)

Publication information
- Publisher: Hillborough Studios; Bell Features
- Created by: Adrian Dingle

In-story information
- Alter ego: Alana North
- Partnerships: Koliak the Mighty (father); Tanero (brother)
- Abilities: Telepathy; Invisibility; Travel at light speed Heat ray

Nelvana of the Northern Lights is a Canadian comic book character and the first Canadian female superhero, debuting in Hillborough Studios' Triumph-Adventure Comics #1 (August 1941). She is also one of the first female superheroes, debuting before Wonder Woman, but after Fantomah, the Golden Age Black Widow, Invisible Scarlet O'Neil and others introduced in 1940.

On October 5, 1995, Canada Post issued a stamp depicting her, as part of the "Comic Book Superheroes" series that also included Superman, Johnny Canuck, Captain Canuck and Fleur de Lys.

== Publication history ==
The character was created, written, and illustrated by Adrian Dingle, who was inspired by tales brought back from the Arctic by Group of Seven painter Franz Johnston. Franz Johnston had met a young woman, either Cecile Nelvana or Connie Nelvana, during his stay at Coppermine, NWT (now Kugluktuk, Nunavut), and was inspired by this 'arctic Madonna' to create a superheroine. Nelvana's superpowers included turning invisible and travelling at the speed of light along a ray of the Northern Lights. She visited lost kingdoms under the ice, journeyed to other dimensions and fought against the Axis powers during World War II, eventually taking on the secret identity of secret agent Alana North.

Nelvana of Northern Lights, or Nelvana of the North for short, debuted in Triumph-Adventure Comics #1, published by Hillborough Studios in August 1941. After the seventh issue in February 1942, Dingle took Triumph-Adventure and Nelvana to Bell Features. Her final appearance was in May 1947, in Super-Duper Comics #3.

In 1971, Michael Hirsh and Patrick Loubert purchased the rights to Bell Features comic books from Commercial Signs of Canada. Today the rights are jointly held by Library & Archives Canada and Nelvana Limited.

== Fictional character biography ==
Nelvana is a powerful Inuk mythological figure protecting the people of the North with her superhuman abilities. She is the daughter of a mortal woman and Koliak the Mighty, King of the Northern Lights. The gods were outraged with Koliak and his marriage to a mortal woman, and therefore his physical form is no longer visible, although his spirit is manifested in the form of the Northern Lights. Nelvana draws on the powers of her father and the Northern Lights to fight super-powered Nazi agents in the North.

=== Power and abilities ===
Nelvana has several superhuman powers, including the ability to fly at the speed of light on a giant ray of the Northern Lights, call on the powers of her father, melt metal, and disrupt radio communications. Nelvana is also telepathic and can turn invisible, as well as change her physical form.

=== Supporting cast ===
Nelvana is often found fighting crime with her brother Tanero, and with help from their father Koliak, King of the Northern Lights. Later, she is joined by the Mountie Corporal Keene. Tanero, though having powers similar to Nelvana, lived under a curse that forbade him from being seen by white men, and thus reverted to the form of a dog whenever they were present.

== Cultural impact ==
As Canada's first distinctly Canadian female superhero, Nelvana of the Northern Lights mitigated the lack of Canadian comic book heroes.

Nelvana Limited, a Canadian entertainment company founded in 1971, was named after Nelvana of the Northern Lights.

== Appearances ==
=== Kablunets (Triumph Comics #1–7) ===
Called upon to stop "evil white ones" (Kablunets) from using time bombs to destroy fish and other food stocks in the North, Nelvana and her brother Tanero are assisted by Koliak and use the Northern Lights as a gigantic magnet to magnetize the enemy bombs towards the sky, destroying them harmlessly. Commander Toroff attacks Nelvana and her brother from his Devil Ship with killer boats. Nelvana and Tanero land on Toroff's ship, and Nelvana instructs Tanero to destroy Toroff's fleet and killer boats. Meanwhile, Nelvana searches Toroff's quarters, looking for his plans. Nelvana comes across Toroff's plans but is soon captured. Toroff then orders his men to tie her up, leaving her hanging above a gaping digestor pit. Sensing his daughter's peril, Koliak informs Tanero and in turn rescues Nelvana. The Devil Ship is eventually destroyed along with the Kablunet fleet.

=== Nelvana of the Northern Lights in the strange frozen world of Glacia (Triumph Comics #8–18) ===
Koliak informs Nelvana that Glacia, a lost world, is hidden beneath the Arctic ice, under the polestar. Nelvana, after entering Glacia, learns that it is threatened by the giant Mammoth Men, who are controlled by Vultor, the wicked scientist who is intent on learning Glacia's secret of eternal life. While Nelvana is dealing with matters in Glacia, the Japanese launch an attack on the Alcan Highway where they drop "swarms of savage, starved Manchurian wolves", but before they can kill the Alcan work crews, Nelvana, who is riding a polar bear, reappears and destroys the wolves.

=== Nelvana of the Northern Lights and the Ice-Beam (Triumph Comics #19–23) ===
Felix Langdon has created a secret weapon ice beam with his brother Silas, and is eventually kidnapped. Koliak informs Nelvana to go south and obtain a new secret identity. Nelvana and Silas fly to Nortonville, Ontario together where they meet policeman Sgt. Michael O'Donnelly, who assists Nelvana in assuming her new secret identity: Secret Agent Alana North. Nelvana and Silas eventually discover the headquarters of One-Ear Brunner, an evil Nazi villain holding Felix hostage. Brunner captures Nelvana and Silas and demands the plans for the secret ice beam. Nelvana saves the day by defeating Bruner and rescuing Felix. The plans for the ice beam are final and it is used in Britain for a target attack to bring down Nazi robot bombs.

=== Nelvana and the Death Dealing Double (Nelvana of the Northern Lights) ===
Nelvana discovers an imposter using her name to exploit Inuit trappers for furs. The imposter Sade, goes insane upon meeting the real Nelvana and kills herself.

=== Nelvana of the Northern Lights and the Ether People (Triumph Comics #24–29, Super-Duper #3) ===
Corporal Keene is confronted by a little green man, an emissary from the ether world Etheria (the void band surrounding the outer strata of the globe), who warns that Earth's radio broadcasts must stop, as they are driving the Etherians crazy. At first Keene doubts his own sanity but then realizes the encounter was for real and decides to find Nelvana, who, as Alana North, is in Ottawa. An Etherian confronts Nelvana and repeats the warning. Nelvana makes him disappear and then arranges for the construction of the largest radio loudspeaker ever built, which will serve as the entry point to Etheria for her and Keene.

After entering the stratosphere, dealing with the Queen of Statica and the flame men, and witnessing the explosion of the Atom Bomb in New Mexico, Keene and Nelvana arrive in Etheria just as the invasion fleet prepares to attack. They are captured and are forced to accompany the invaders. Before arriving on the Earth, the invaders stop so that Nelvana can meet the invaders' real leader, Vultor, who uses a magic stone to hypnotize Nelvana and then launches an attack on Glacia. Keene knocks the stone out of Vultor's hand, thus freeing Nelvana to use her powers. Nelvana defeats the Etherians, but Vultor escapes.

=== Nelvana and the Indestructible Crime King (Triumph Comics #30) ===
Nelvana confronts Knuckles, a criminal inventor who has coated himself with indestructible plastic. Nelvana uses her powers to melt his protective skin.

=== Nelvana Meets Her Match (Triumph Comics #31) ===
Nelvana battles with Dr. Electra, a super-criminal armed with an Atom Ray. Dr. Electra tries to frame Nelvana for the murder of the reporter Jim Blair, but Nelvana succeeds in rescuing Blair.

== Collected editions ==
A Kickstarter campaign to republish Nelvana of the Northern Lights for the first time since the original publication was launched in October 2013. It was fully funded within five days of being launched.

- Dingle, Adrian (2014). Nicholson, Hope; Richey, Rachel (eds.). Nelvana of the Northern Lights. Foreword by Benjamin Woo. Afterword by Michael Hirsh. San Diego: IDW Publishing. ISBN 978-1-63140-128-2.

== See also ==
- Canadian Whites
- Canadian comics
- Dawnstar - a later DC Comics superhero also of North American Indigenous descent.
