= John Bell (historian) =

Canadian historian

John Bell (born 1952) is a Canadian comics historian and senior archivist at Library and Archives Canada (Ottawa, Ontario). He specializes in the history of English Canadian comic books, and has curated a number of exhibitions and websites.

He has contributed to the Literary Review of Canada, Event, This Magazine, and Maisonneuve, and was former editor of the poetry magazine Arc. On the subject of comics, he has contributed to The Comics Journal, The Canadian Encyclopedia, The Classics Collector, and Heritage Post.

== Early life ==
Bell was born in Montreal, Quebec, Canada, with roots in Halifax, Nova Scotia.

== Comics historian ==
Bell is considered an expert on comics, and on the history of Canadian comics in particular. He has authored a number of books on the subject, starting with Canuck Comics in 1986, followed by Guardians of the North in 1992, on Canadian superheroes, and Invaders from the North in 2006.

In 1992, he curated the Guardians of the North: The National Superhero in Canadian Comic-Book Art exhibition, which was revised and expanded in 2001 into a Library and Archives Canada website. His comic book collection was donated in 1996 to the National Library of Canada's Rare Book Division, where it became known as the John Bell Canadian Comic Book Collection.

== Bibliography ==
- Invaders from the North: How Canada Conquered the Comic Book Universe. Toronto: Dundurn Press, 2006. Foreword by Seth. ISBN 978-1-55002-659-7
- Confederate Seadog: John Taylor Wood in War and Exile. McFarland & Co., 2002. ISBN 978-0-7864-1352-2
- Guardians of the North: The National Superhero in Canadian Comic-Book Art. National Archives of Canada, 1992. ISBN 0-662-19347-4
- Canuck Comics: A Guide to Comic Books Published in Canada. Matrix Books, 1986. Foreword by Harlan Ellison. ISBN 0-921101-00-7
