= Association of Canadian Cartoonists =

Canadian professional association

The Association of Canadian Editorial Cartoonists (ACEC) is a professional association founded in 1988 in Winnipeg to promote the interests of editorial cartoonists in Canada.

In 2015, it changed its name to Association of Canadian Cartoonists.

Townsie awards recognize exceptional contributions to cartooning in Canada.
