= Hillborough Studios =

Defunct Canadian comics publisher

- Status: Defunct (1942)
- Founded: August 1941
- Country of origin: Canada
- Headquarters location: Toronto, Ontario, Canada
- Key people: Adrian Dingle; René Kulbach; André Kulbach
- Publication types: Comic books

Hillborough Studios was a short-lived Canadian comic book publisher, founded in 1941, most notable for publishing Adrian Dingle's Nelvana of the Northern Lights.

== Overview ==
In August 1941, Hillborough was founded in Toronto, Ontario, Canada by Adrian Dingle, the brothers René and André Kulbach, and an anonymous investor. Their flagship title was called Triumph-Adventure Comics, and featured the most famous character of what has been called the Golden Age of Canadian comics—Dingle's Nelvana of the Northern Lights, the first Canadian female superhero, who debuted several months before Wonder Woman.

After seven monthly issues, Dingle brought Triumph-Adventure to Bell Features in early 1942, and was followed by most of the Hillborough staff.
