= Ted McCall =

- Born: Edwin Reid McCall; 1901 Chatham, Ontario, Canada
- Died: 1975 (aged 73–74) Toronto?
- Area: Writer
- Notable works: Robin Hood and Company
- Awards: 2008 Canadian Comic Book Creator Hall of Fame

Edwin Reid McCall (born 1901 in Chatham, Ontario, died 1975) was a Canadian journalist, and a comic strip and comic book writer. He was best known for creating the first comic strip based on the Royal Canadian Mounted Police, Men of the Mounted for the Toronto Evening Telegram and the war hero Freelance for Anglo-American Publishing.

McCall was one of four children of Alexander McCall. He was married to Elise Donaldson (1899–1976) and had one son, Ted Jr.

== Career in comics ==
=== Comic strips ===
On February 13, 1933, The Toronto Evening Telegram began publishing McCall's comic strip Men of the Mounted, drawn by Harry Hall. The strip starred Corporal Keene. It was the first strip based on the RCMP as well as being Canada's first regular adventure strip. Syndicated across Canada, it ran for two years until King of the Royal Mounted, an American strip, began to be published. McCall had approached King Features about syndicating his strip in the United States but was rejected. When King of the Royal Mounted was started, McCall felt they had plagiarized his idea. The last strip was published on February 16, 1935, the day before King of the Royal Mounted started. The strips were also adapted into a Big Little Book published by Whitman Publishing and were featured in trading cards from Willard's Chocolates.

A little over 7 months later, on September 23, 1935, McCall began another strip, this time based on the Robin Hood legends. Robin Hood and Company was illustrated by Charles Snelgrove and was also originally only published in the Telegram. Overall it was more successful and eventually was published internationally in more than 80 papers, including some in the US and Europe. Snelgrove died in late 1939 and, after a brief hiatus, the strip was continued by Syd Stein. The last strip was published on February 16, 1939, after Stein joined the army. The strip was popular and lasted a while because of "McCall's deft writing, inventive plots and earthy humor". It did not follow the traditional plots of the Robin Hood mythos but did include secondary characters such as Little John, Friar Tuck and Will Scarlett.

=== Anglo-American Publishing ===
On December 6, 1940, the War Exchange Conservation Act was passed by the Canadian government. Amongst the things it did was banning the importation of American comic books. McCall saw this as an opportunity and approached Harold Sinnott of Sinnott News. McCall owned both the copyright and the plates for publishing Robin Hood and Company and Sinnot had a press capable of printing comics. In March 1941, the first issue of Robin Hood and Company was published by Anglo-American Publishing, consisting of strip reprints in a tabloid sized format. The comic existed with just reprints for about a year when it became necessary to start producing new material. McCall became the main writer at Anglo-American and brought with him Ed Furness as the main artist. While at Anglo-American Publishing, McCall created the war hero Freelance, "a daring guerrilla battling the Axis powers". McCall's "well rounded scripts...were relatively sophisticated for the time and generally took a realistic approach to war". McCall was also involved in creating the adventures of Red Rover and Commander Steel. Freelance ran from 1941 to January 1947. Robin Hood ran, under various titles, for the same time period. After Anglo-American closed its doors in 1947, McCall never produced anything for comics again.

== Career after comics ==
After the collapse of Anglo-American, McCall went on to become the Managing Editor of the Toronto Evening Telegram. He died in 1975 of a heart attack. In 2008 he was inducted into the Canadian Comic Book Creator Hall of Fame.
