= Canadian comics =

Comic originating in Canada

Canadian comics refers to comics and cartooning by citizens of Canada or permanent residents of Canada regardless of residence. Canada has two official languages, and distinct comics cultures have developed in English and French Canada. The English tends to follow American trends, and the French, Franco-Belgian ones, with little crossover between the two cultures. Canadian comics run the gamut of comics forms, including editorial cartooning, comic strips, comic books, graphic novels, and webcomics, and are published in newspapers, magazines, books, and online. They have received attention in international comics communities and have received support from the federal and provincial governments, including grants from the Canada Council for the Arts. There are comics publishers throughout the country, as well as large small press, self-publishing, and minicomics communities.

In English Canada many cartoonists, from Hal Foster to Todd McFarlane, have sought to further their careers by moving to the United States; since the late 20th century increasing numbers have gained international attention while staying in Canada. During World War II, trade restrictions led to the flourishing of a domestic comic book industry, whose black-and-white "Canadian Whites" contained original stories of heroes such as Nelvana of the Northern Lights as well as American scripts redrawn by Canadian artists. The war's end saw American imports and domestic censorship lead to the death of this industry. The alternative and small press communities grew in the 1970s, and by the end of the century Dave Sim's Cerebus and Chester Brown's comics, amongst others, gained international audiences and critical acclaim, and Drawn & Quarterly became a leader in arts-comics publishing. In the 21st century, comics have gained wider audiences and higher levels of recognition, especially in the form of graphic novels and webcomics.

In French Canada indigenous comics are called BDQ or bande dessinée québécoise (French pronunciation: [bɑ̃d dɛ.si.ne ke.be.kwaz]) Cartoons with speech balloons in Quebec date to the late 1700s. BDQ have alternately flourished and languished throughout Quebec's history as the small domestic market has found it difficult to compete with foreign imports. Many cartoonists from Quebec have made their careers in the United States. Since the Springtime of BDQ in the 1970s native comics magazines, such as Croc and Safarir, and comics albums have become more common, though they account for only 5% of total sales in the province. Since the turn of the 21st century cartoonists such as Michel Rabagliati, Guy Delisle, and the team of Dubuc and Delaf have seen international success in French-speaking Europe and in translation. Éditions Mille-Îles and La Pastèque are amongst the domestic publishers that have become increasingly common.

== History ==
=== English Canada ===
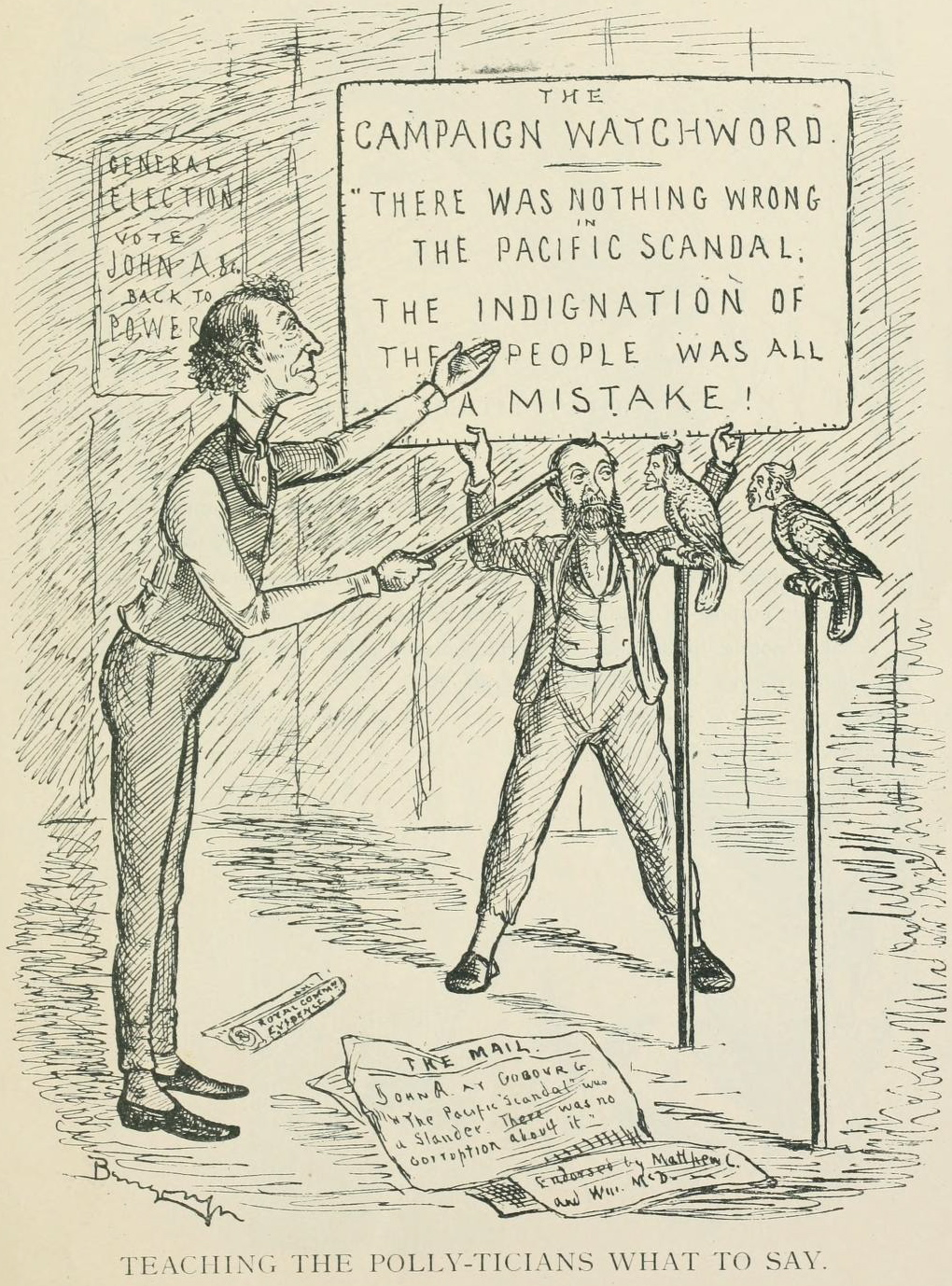
Prime Minister John A. Macdonald was a favourite target of John Bengough's popular caricatures.

==== Early history (1759–1910s) ====
Brigadier-General George Townshend's cartoons lampooning General James Wolfe in 1759 are recognized as the first examples of political cartooning in Canadian history. Cartoons did not have a regular forum in Canada until John Henry Walker's short-lived weekly Punch in Canada débuted in Montreal in 1849. The magazine was a Canadian version of Britain's humorous Punch and featured cartoons by Walker. It paved the way for a number of similar short-lived publications, until the success of the more straight-laced Canadian Illustrated News, published by George-Édouard Desbarats beginning in 1869, soon after Canadian Confederation.

In 1873, John Wilson Bengough founded Grip, a humour magazine in the style of Punch and the American Harper's Weekly. It featured a large number of cartoons, especially Bengough's own. The cartoons tended to be political, and Prime Minister John A. Macdonald and Métis rebel leader Louis Riel were favourite targets. The Pacific Scandal in the early 1870s gave Bengough much fodder to raise his reputation as a political caricaturist. According to historian John Bell, while Bengough was probably the most significant pre-20th-century Canadian cartoonist, Henri Julien was likely the most accomplished. Published widely both at home and abroad, Julien's cartoons appeared in periodicals such as Harper's Weekly and Le Monde illustré. In 1888, he gained employment at the Montreal Star and became the first full-time newspaper cartoonist in Canada.

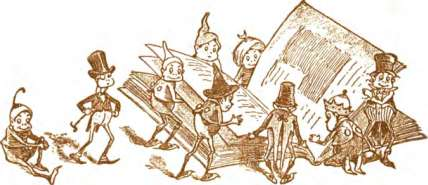
Palmer Cox had an international hit with The Brownies in the late 19th and early 20th centuries

Palmer Cox, a Canadian expatriate in the United States, at this time created The Brownies, a popular, widely merchandised phenomenon whose first book collection sold over a million copies. Cox began a Brownies comic strip in 1898 that was one of the earliest English-language strips, and had begun to use speech balloons by the time it ended in 1907.

==== Age of comic strips (1920s–1930s) ====
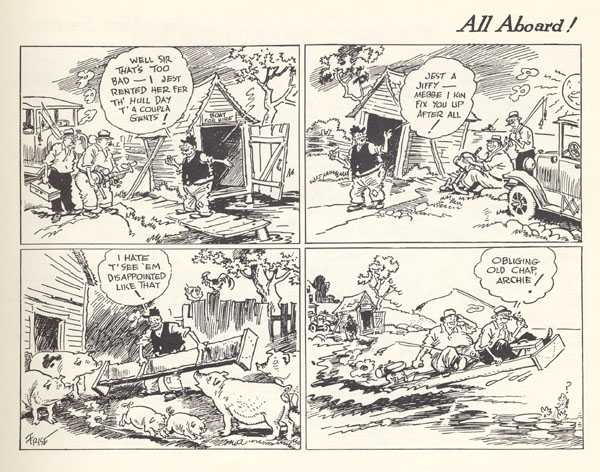
Jimmy Frise's Birdseye Center (later Juniper Junction) was the longest-running strip in English Canada

Canadian cartoonists often found it hard to succeed in the field of comic strips without moving to the US, but in 1921, Jimmy Frise, one of Ernest Hemingway's drinking buddies during the journalist's days in Toronto, sold Life's Little Comedies to the Toronto Star's Star Weekly. This strip was later retitled Birdseye Center, and became the longest-running strip in English Canadian history. In 1947, Frise brought the strip to the Montreal Standard, where it was renamed Juniper Junction. Nova Scotia-born artist J. R. Williams single-panel strip about rural and small-town life, Out Our Way, began in 1922 and was syndicated in 700 newspapers at its peak.

Two new comic strips appeared on the same day in 1929 in American newspapers and fed the public's desire for escapist entertainment at the dawn of the Great Depression. They were the first non-humorous adventure strips, and both were adaptations. One was Buck Rogers; the other, Tarzan, by Halifax native Hal Foster, who had worked as illustrator for catalogues from Eaton's and the Hudson's Bay Company before moving to the US in his late 20s. Other adventure strips soon followed and paved the way for the genre diversity that was seen in comic strips in the 1930s. In 1937, Foster began his own strip, Prince Valiant, which has become his best-known work for Foster's dextrous, realistic artwork. After struggling to support himself at various Toronto-based publications, Richard Taylor, under the pen name "Ric", became a regular at The New Yorker and relocated to the US, where the pay and opportunities for cartoonists were better.

The Toronto Telegram began to run Men of the Mounted in 1933, the first home-grown adventure strip, written by Ted McCall and drawn by Harry Hall. McCall later penned the strip Robin Hood and Company, which made its appearance in comic books when McCall founded Anglo-American Publishing in 1941.

==== Golden age: Canadian Whites (1940s) ====
The Golden Age of Comic Books and subsequent superhero boom began with the release in June 1938 of Action Comics #1. The cover story was the first appearance of Superman, drawn by Toronto-born Joe Shuster. Shuster modeled Superman's Metropolis after his memories of Toronto, and the newspaper Clark Kent worked for after the Toronto Daily Star, which he had delivered as a child. These comics crossed the border and quickly gained Canadian fans as well.

In December 1940, the War Exchange Conservation Act was passed. It restricted the importation of goods from the US that were deemed non-essential to combat the trade deficit Canada had with its neighbours to the south. American comic books were casualties of the Act. In 1941, to fill the void, a number of Canadian comic book publishers sprang up, starting in March with Anglo-American Publishing in Toronto and Maple Leaf Publishing in Vancouver. Adrian Dingle's Hillborough Studios and Bell Features soon joined them. The comics printed by these companies had colour covers, but the innards were in black-and-white, and thus collectors call them Canadian Whites. Superheroes stories were prominent, and the "Whites" often relied on serials to keep readers coming back for more.

Better Comics from Maple Leaf and Robin Hood and Company from Anglo-American were the first titles to hit the stands. Robin Hood was a tabloid-sized comic strip reprint magazine, while Better was made up of original material in traditional comic-book format, and thus can be said to be the first true Canadian comic book. It included the appearance of the first Canadian superhero, Vernon Miller's Iron Man. John Stables, under the pen name John St. Ables, was responsible for Brok Windsor's debut in Better in the spring of 1944—a fantasy-adventure set far in the "land beyond the mists" in the Canadian North. The success of Better led to a proliferation of titles from Maple Leaf.

Adrian Dingle's Nelvana of the Northern Lights, Canada's first female superhero

The driving creative forces behind Anglo-American were Ted McCall, the writer of the Men of the Mounted and Robin Hood strips, and artist Ed Furness. The pair created a number of heroes with such names as Freelance, Purple Rider, Red Rover, and Commander Steel. Anglo-American also published stories based on imported American scripts bought from Fawcett Publications, with fresh artwork by Canadians to bypass trade restrictions. Captain Marvel and Bulletman were amongst the characters that had Canadian adaptations. Anglo-American published a large number of titles, including Freelance, Grand Slam, Three Aces, Whiz, Captain Marvel and Atom Smasher, but relied less on serials, and was less patriotically Canadian than its rival publishers. It employed a number of talented artists, but they were kept to a "house style" of drawing, in the vein of Captain Marvel's C. C. Beck.

In August 1941, three unemployed artists, Adrian Dingle and André and René Kulbach, formed Hillborough Studios to publish their own work. They started with Triumph-Adventure Comics, whose star was Canada's first female superhero, Nelvana of the Northern Lights, who appeared several months before Wonder Woman did in the US. Nelvana was inspired by tribal stories brought back from the Arctic Group of Seven painter Franz Johnston. The popular fur-miniskirted superheroine was a powerful Inuit mythological figure, daughter of a mortal woman and Koliak the Mighty, King of the Northern Lights. She had telepathic powers and was able to ride the Northern Lights at the speed of light, turn invisible, and melt metal.

In March 1942, Dingle and most of the Hillborough staff moved with Nelvana to Toronto-based Bell Features, which had begun publishing comics in September 1941 with the first issue of the successful Wow Comics—in colour at first, but Bell soon switched to the familiar "White" format. Bell was the most prolific of the Canadian comic-book publishers. Its comics were drawn by a large pool of artists, including freelancers, adolescents, and women, and were unabashedly Canadian. Aside from Nelvana, there were Edmund Legault's Dixon of the Mounted, Jerry Lazare's Phantom Rider, and Fred Kelly's Doc Stearne. Leo Bachle's Johnny Canuck was the second Canadian national hero, and debuted in Bell's Dime Comics in February 1942.

The new Canadian comics were successful; Bell reached accumulated weekly sales of 100,000 by 1943. By this time, Educational Projects of Montréal had joined, selling comics in the "White" format. Educational specialized in a different sort of fare: biographies of prime ministers, cases of the RCMP, and historical tales, drawn by accomplished artists including George M. Rae and Sid Barron. Educational's Canadian Heroes earned endorsements from cabinet ministers and appealed to parents and educators, but was not as appealing to the kids it was aimed at until Rae convinced publisher Harry J. Halperin to allow him to include a fictional character, Canada Jack — a hero who battled Nazis.

With the end of World War II in 1945, Canadian comic-book publishing faced competition from American publishers again. Educational and latecomer Feature Publications folded immediately. Maple Leaf tried to compete by switching to colour and by trying to break into the British market. Anglo-American and another newcomer, Al Rucker Publications, tried to compete directly with the Americans, and even achieved distribution in the US. By the end of 1946 it was clear that the remaining publishers could not compete, and for the time being original comic-book publishing came to an end in Canada, although some publishers like Bell Features survived by republishing American books until the War Exchange Conservation Act was officially abolished in 1951. The cartoonists who insisted on drawing for a living faced several choices: some moved across the border to attempt to make it with the American publishers, and some moved into illustration work, as Jerry Lazare, Vernon Miller, Jack Tremblay, and Harold Bennett did. Another avenue was the route Sid Barron followed into political cartooning. By 1949, out of 176 comics titles on the newsstand, only 23 were Canadian.

==== Post-war (late 1940s–early 1970s) ====
With the end of most original Canadian comic book publishing in 1947, Canada's superheroes disappeared, and the country entered a phase of foreign comic book domination. In November 1948, a crime comics scare hit the country when a pair of voracious comic book readers in Dawson Creek, British Columbia, shot at a random car while playing highwaymen, fatally wounding a passenger. When authorities discovered their taste for comic books, media attention focused on the emerging crime comics genre as an influence on juvenile delinquency. A bill to amend Section 207 of the Criminal Code was drafted, and passed unanimously, making it an offense to make, print, publish, distribute, sell, or own "any magazine, periodical or book which exclusively or substantially comprises matter depicting pictorially the commission of crimes, real or fictitious", on 10 December 1949. Comics publishers across Canada banded together to create the Comic Magazine Industry Association of Canada (CMIAC), a Canadian industry self-censoring body similar to the American Comics Code Authority that would be formed a few years later in response to a similar crime comics scare in the U.S. Purely by coincidence, the Netherlands had experienced a near-similar comics related incident at almost the exact same time with an equally lethal outcome, and causing a similar popular reaction, but in this case the authorities refrained from taking the drastic legal actions, their Canadian counterparts did.

Superior Publishers, however, defied the ban, while also moving into the U.S. market. Watchdogs turned up the heat, and in 1953 a distributor was found guilty of distributing obscenities. Some of Superior's titles found themselves in Fredric Wertham's notorious and influential diatribe on the influence comics had on juvenile delinquency, Seduction of the Innocent, published in 1954. The United States Senate Subcommittee on Juvenile Delinquency, established in 1953, had public hearings a few months later, and called upon Kamloops, British Columbia Member of Parliament E. Davie Fulton, one of Superior publisher William Zimmerman's most outspoken enemies, as a witness. The Comics Code Authority was soon formed, and Superior, like fellow American publisher EC Comics, saw their sales dwindle throughout 1955. Prosecutions increased throughout Canada, with Superior successfully defending themselves in one, and another supposedly comics-related murder was reported in Westville, Nova Scotia. Superior shut its doors in 1956, and until the 1970s, English Canadian newsstand comic book publishing was no more, although a number of "giveaway" comics continued to be produced by Orville Ganes' Ganes Productions and Owen McCarron's Comic Book World, who produced the educational and cautionary comics for governments and corporations, aimed at kids and teens.

Doug Wright's Nipper was a mainstay in Canadian newspapers in the post-war years

The crackdown was not aimed at comic strips, however, and several notable new ones appeared, like Lew Saw's One-Up, Winslow Mortimer's Larry Brannon and Al Beaton's Ookpik. After Jimmy Frise's death in 1948, Juniper Junction was taken over by Doug Wright, "one of Canada's best post-war comic-strip artists". He would continue with the strip until 1968, while also working on his own Nipper from 1949. In 1967, Nipper became Doug Wright's Family when Wright moved from Montreal to Ontario, and the popular strip continued until 1980. The Doug Wright Awards were inaugurated in his honour in 2005. From 1948 to 1972, James Simpkins' cartoon Jasper the Bear appeared continuously in Maclean's magazine. Jasper was hugely popular across Canada and was used, and is still today, as the symbol for Jasper National Park.

To express his anger at the US military's nuclear tests in the Bikini Atoll in 1946 English-born artist Laurence Hyde produced a wordless novel in 1951 called Southern Cross. In 118 silent pages, the book depicts atomic testing by the US military and its effects Polynesian island inhabitants. While it had no direct effect on comics at the time, it has come to be seen as a precursor to the Canadian graphic novel.

Early editorial cartooning lacked a local flavour, tending to be a pale imitation of American examples. It tended to be cheery, non-confrontational, and supported good causes. Following the War it broke from typical American clichés and took on more of a savage bite, especially compared to the more allegorical tendencies of American editorial cartoons. At Le Devoir, Robert Lapalme was the first to cartoon in this particularly Canadian idiom, and in 1963 organized an International Salon of Caricature and Cartoon in Montreal. Lapalme was later followed by Duncan Macpherson at the Toronto Star, Leonard Norris at the Vancouver Sun and Ed McNally at the Montreal Star. These cartoonists frequently took political positions contrary to those of the papers in which they were published. Macpherson drew a cartoon of John Diefenbaker as Marie Antoinette saying "Let them eat cake" in response to the Prime Minister's cancelling the Avro Arrow project, which historian Pierre Berton has called the beginning of Canadians' disillusionment with Diefenbaker's government. Macpherson in particular fought fiercely for editorial independence, challenging his editors and threatening to quit the Star if not given his way, which paved a new path for other cartoonists to follow.

In the spring of 1966, Canada saw its first specialty comic shop open its doors on Queen Street West, Toronto: Viking Bookshop, established by "Captain George" Henderson. Entirely unfamiliar with the new phenomenon, the store was dubbed "the campiest store in town" by Toronto Star reporter Robert Fulford. No longer in existence, Viking Bookshop is currently the earliest known such specialty comic book store in North-America (or worldwide for that matter), predating the oldest known US comic book store, Gary Arlington's San Francisco Comic Book Company (est. April 1968), by two years. One year later, in May 1967, the store was renamed Memory Lane Books after it had relocated to Markham Street in the same city, and as such became an inspiration for pioneering retailer Harry Kremer and Bill Johnson to open Now & Then Books in Kitchener, Ontario. Its newsletter, the Now and Then Times, published early work by the young Dave Sim in its inaugural issue in 1972, and later employed him from 1976 to 1977.

In the late 1960s, along with the countercultural movement, a new form of comic art appeared from the avant-garde and literary scenes—underground comics (or "comix") aimed at an adult audience. Early examples appeared in certain magazines, but an early precursor of Canadian underground comic books was Scraptures, as a special issue of the Toronto avant-garde literary magazine grOnk in 1967. In 1969, Canada saw its first true underground comics, with SFU Komix and Snore Comix. These comix drew their inspiration from the American underground movement that exploded after the release of Robert Crumb's Zap in early 1968. Martin Vaugh-James produced an early graphic novel when he had Elephant released by Press Porcépic in 1970. The underground movement paralleled that of the US, in that it peaked from 1970 to 1972 with the peak of the counterculture, and witnessed a sharp decline afterward. Saskatoon, Saskatchewan's Dave Geary and Vancouver, British Columbia's Rand Holmes were key figures, Holmes being the creator of the Harold Hedd comic strip.

Humour magazine Fuddle Duddle, named after a famous euphemism by then-Prime Minister Pierre Trudeau, was a short lived attempt at a Canadian Mad-style satirical magazine. It was the first comic book of Canadian content to be available on newsstands since 1956. Two of its contributors, Peter Evans and Stanley Berneche, would soon go on to bring superheroes back to Canada for the first time since the demise of Nelvana in 1947, with Captain Canada.

The fan press and fandom grew throughout this period, and was bolstered when Patrick Loubert and Michael Hirsh, the founders of the animation company Nelvana, published The Great Canadian Comic Books in 1971, a book-length study of the Bell Features comics, and the touring of a related exhibition mounted by the National Gallery of Canada, Comic Art Traditions in Canada, 1941-45, which together served to introduce English-Canadian comics creators and fans to their lost heritage.

Towards the middle of the 1970s, comics aimed at children gradually disappeared. The new breed of underground, alternative and independent comics was aimed at a more mature audience, which ran counter to the public's perception, as well as to legal restrictions. The first wave of alternative comics in the seventies was largely made up of science fiction and fantasy comics, made by budding cartoonists like Gene Day, Dave Sim, Augustine Funnell, Jim Craig, Ken Steacy, Dean Motter, and Vincent Marchesano.

==== New wave (mid-1970s–1980s) ====
The mid-1970s saw the beginning of a new wave of Canadian comics, one in which the creators chose to remain in Canada, rather than seeking their fortunes south of the border. T. Casey Brennan created the first non-satirical superhero in Canada since the 1940s with his character The Northern Light who appeared in the second issue of Orb Magazine in 1974 only to disappear after his 1977 appearance in Power Comics. Richard Comely's more popular and widely distributed Captain Canuck first appeared in July 1975 and would go on to be sporadically published and rebooted until the 2020s. During the 1950s and 1960s, the idea of native comics seemed unattainable to Canadian kids, and the appearance of Captain Canuck gave these kids the optimism to make their own. This was followed up with James Waley's more professional, newsstand-distributed Orb, which featured a number of talents that would later take part in the North American comics scene.

The comics magazines showing up in Canada at the time suffered from promotion and distribution problems, however, getting most of their support from the fan press. Phil Seuling's California-based comics distributor Bud Plant was supportive of these underground and alternative comics, though, and helped get them into stores. Eventually, distributors like Bud Plant and the emergence of specialty comic shops would form a distribution network for small press comics that would thrive independently of the traditional newsstands.

Lynn Johnston's For Better or For Worse, the most widely distributed Canadian comic strip

The world of comic strips saw a number of works pop up. Ben Wicks was doing The Outsiders and Wicks, Jim Unger's Herman debuted in 1975, and Ted Martin's Pavlov in 1979. In 1978, Lynn Johnston, living in Lynn Lake, Manitoba, began For Better or For Worse, which was noted for following the lives of the Patterson family as they grew older in real time, and dealt with real-life issues. The strip based a number of its storylines on Johnston's real-life experiences with her own family, as well as social issues such as the midlife crisis, divorce, the coming out of a gay character, child abuse, and death. In 1985, she became the first female cartoonist to win a Reuben Award, and the Friends of Lulu added her to the Women Cartoonists Hall of Fame in 2002. The strip was very popular, appearing in over 2000 newspapers in 25 countries.

Editorial cartoonists held considerable sway between the 1950s through the 1970s. Former Prime Minister Joe Clark has been quoted that he lost votes in the election of 1980 due to political cartoons about him. They have also experienced the fear of censorship through the courts, or "libel chill". In 1979, Robert Bierman and the Victoria Times was the subject of a libel suit when he criticized the policies of William Vander Zalm, the British Columbia Minister of Human Resources, with a cartoon of the Minister pulling the wings off flies. When the courts ruled in Vander Zalm's favour, newspapers across the nation ran their own versions of the cartoon in support, until the BC Court of Appeal reversed the ruling in 1980, deeming the cartoon "fair comment". It was later acquired by the National Archives of Canada.

Dave Sim proselytized self-publishing and creators' rights while pushing artistic boundaries with his series, Cerebus.

Captain Canuck and Orb both folded by 1976, but in Kitchener, Ontario in December 1977, Dave Sim's independent comic book Cerebus debuted, and would become the longest-lived original Canadian comic book. Benefiting from distribution in the emerging comic shop market, it started as a Howard the Duck-like parody of Barry Windsor-Smith's Conan the Barbarian comics. The story eventually grew to fit Sim's expanding ambitions, both in content and technique, with its earth-pig protagonist getting embroiled in politics, becoming prime minister of a powerful city-state, then a Pope who ascends to the moon—all within the first third of its projected 300-issue run. Sim came to conceive the series as a self-enclosed story, which itself would be divided into novels—or graphic novels, which were gaining in prominence in the North American comic book world in the 1980s and 1990s. While Sim and his partner Gerhard's technical achievements impressed and influenced his peers, Sim also spoke out for creators' rights, promoted his peers and up-and-coming creators, and fiercely promoted self-publishing as an ideal. Americans Jeff Smith with Bone and Terry Moore with Strangers in Paradise took Sim's cue, as did Canadian M'Oak (Mark Oakley) with his long-running Thieves and Kings. Eddie Campbell took Sim's personal advice to self-publish the collected From Hell at the turn of the century. Sim also stirred considerable controversy, sometimes with the content of Cerebus, and sometimes with his editorials and personal interactions.

David Boswell was amongst those in the 1980s who made the jump from the fanzine world when he began self-publishing Reid Fleming, World's Toughest Milkman in 1980. From out of the same scene, Bill Marks started publishing the anthology Vortex in Toronto in 1982. Marks' Vortex Comics expanded into publishing other comics. The publisher gained publicity for Mister X, which employed the talents of Dean Motter, Gilberto and Jaime Hernandez and, later, Torontonians Seth and Jeffrey Morgan. Most notably, Marks picked up Chester Brown's Yummy Fur, a taboo-breaking series which started in 1983 as a self-published, photocopied minicomic. It had generated some buzz, and Vortex started publishing it professionally at the end of 1986. Yummy Fur's stories were a mix of genres, with the improvised, surreal Ed the Happy Clown, straight adaptations of the Gospels, and revealing, bare-all autobiographical stories. Brown would become a major figure in Canadian comics.

As the content of comics matured throughout the 1980s, they became the subject of increasing scrutiny. In 1986, Calgary comic shop Comic Legends was raided and charged with obscenity. In response, Derek McCulloch and Paul Stockton of Strawberry Jam Comics established the Comic Legends Legal Defense Fund to help retailers, distributors, publishers, and creators fight against obscenity charges. To raise funds, they published two True North anthologies of Canadian talent.

During this time, large numbers of Canadian artists were making waves in the American comic book market as well, such as John Byrne, Gene Day and his brother Dan, Jim Craig, Rand Holmes, Geof Isherwood, Ken Steacy, Dean Motter, George Freeman and Dave Ross. Byrne was particularly popular for his work on X-Men, and also originated Alpha Flight, about a team of Canadian superheroes.

==== 1990s ====
In 1990, Montreal-based publisher Drawn & Quarterly began with an anthology title also named Drawn & Quarterly. It quickly picked up a number of other titles, such as Julie Doucet's semi-autobiographical, bilingual Dirty Plotte, which, like Yummy Fur, had started out as a minicomic; Seth's Palookaville; illegal resident from the US Joe Matt's Peepshow; and Yummy Fur, which made the jump with its twenty-fifth issue. At the time, an autobiographical comics trend took place. Brown, Seth and Matt in particular were thought of as a Toronto comics rat pack, depicting one another in their comics and doing signings and interviews together.

Drawn & Quarterly was at the forefront of the maturation comic books saw in the 1990s, publishing and promoting the works of adult-oriented Canadian and international artists. The publisher avoided genres like superheroes, which publisher Chris Oliveros saw as stifling comics' growth. These comics had artistic aspirations, and graphic novels became increasingly prominent, with Brown's autobiographical The Playboy and I Never Liked You, and Seth's faux-autobiographical It's a Good Life, If You Don't Weaken garnering considerable attention.

Todd McFarlane from Calgary had been making waves since the late 1980s illustrating comics for DC and Marvel Comics, becoming a fan favourite writer/artist for Spider-Man. He eventually left to co-found the creator-owned comics publishing collective Image Comics, where he debuted the enormously successful Spawn. Spawn holds the record for most copies sold of an independent comic, and was the most financially successful comics franchise of the decade. A number of early webcomics were created by Canadian authors, such as Space Moose by Adam Thrasher, Bob the Angry Flower by Stephen Notley, User Friendly by J.D. Frazer, and The Joy of Tech by Liza Schmalcel and Bruce Evans.

==== 21st century ====
Chester Brown's best-selling Louis Riel was the first work in comics to receive a Canada Council grant.

At the dawn of the 21st century, the comics industry had changed considerably. The graphic novel had come into its own, and traditional comics sales dropped significantly. Louis Riel, who had been a major target of John Bengough's caricatures in the early days of Confederation, was the protagonist in Chester Brown's award-winning, best-selling "comic-strip biography". With his graphic novels and book collections, he gained a wider audience than he had with his serial comic books, and he abandoned serial comics entirely to focus on original graphic novels after Louis Riel. Greater appreciation of the artform was shown when Brown and Seth became recipients of grants from the Canada Council for the Arts. Dave Sim's Cerebus completed its planned 26-year, 300-issue run in 2004.

Foreign comics, especially Japanese, became quite successful in Canada, and stood out for gaining large numbers of female fans, who had traditionally stayed away from comic books. They also had a significant influence on artists such as Bryan Lee O'Malley and his Scott Pilgrim series. Due to differing social norms, the content of these comics are sometimes censored or ran afoul of Canadian customs officials. Incidental nudity could be interpreted by them as child pornography and result in jail terms.

Drawn & Quarterly has become known as a house for art comics, translations of non-English works, like Montrealer Michel Rabagliati's Paul series, and archive editions of classic comics, such as Wright's Little Nipper. The publisher has earned a reputation for the special attention they put into book design, and has played a pivotal rôle in shaping comics' rise in artistic prominence, and in getting comics into mainstream book stores in both Canada and the US. D&Q publisher Chris Oliveros, along with Art Spiegelman, lobbied bookstores to include a section for graphic novels, which would be subdivided by subject.

Webcomics, such as Kate Beaton's Hark! A Vagrant, Ryan North's Dinosaur Comics, Ryan Sohmer and Lar deSouza's Looking for Group, and Karl Kerschl's The Abominable Charles Christopher, became an increasingly popular outlet for Canadian cartoonists. The popularity of Beaton's work has led to it being published in book form, with Time magazine placing it in the top 10 fiction books of 2011. The comics community in Canada has grown, and has grown appreciative of its talent, celebrating it with awards such as the Doug Wrights and Joe Shusters, as well as with classy events such as the international Toronto Comic Arts Festival, which has been cosponsored by the Toronto Public Library since 2009.

=== French Canada ===
The comics of Québec, also known as "BDQ" (bande dessinée québécoise), have followed a different path than those of English Canada. While newspapers tend to populate their funny pages with syndicated American comic strips, in general comics there have followed Franco-Belgian comics, with The Adventures of Tintin and Asterix being particularly popular and influential. Comics also tend to be printed in the comic album format that is popular in Europe. Aside from humorous parodies, there is no superhero tradition in Québec comics.

==== Early history (1790s–1960s) ====
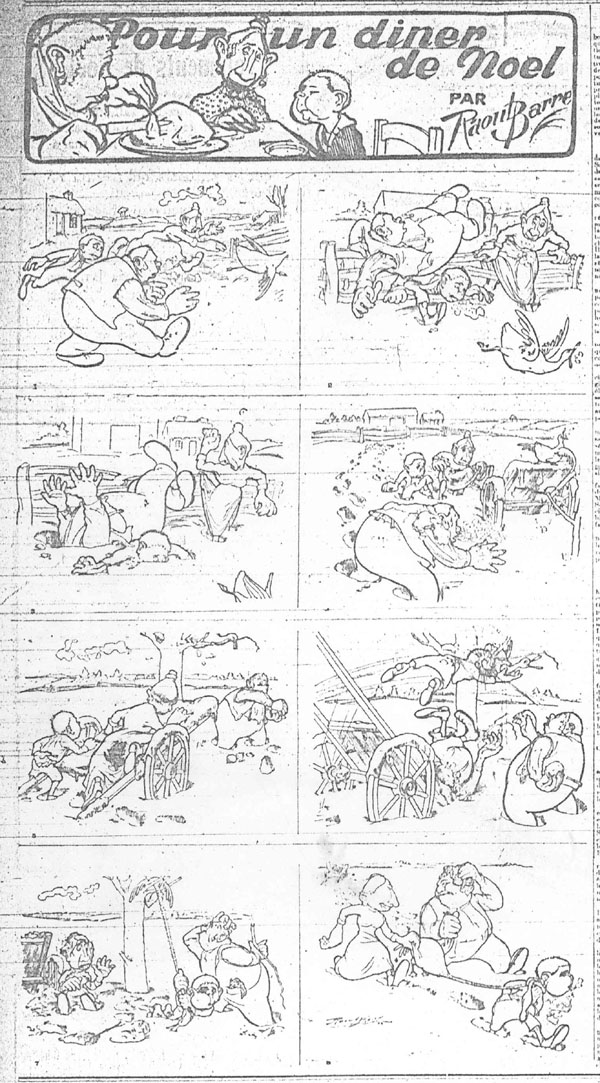
"Pour un dîner de Noël" (Raoul Barré, 1902), the first comic strip to appear in a daily Québec newspaper. Barré demonstrates an interest in movement, which he would develop later as a pioneer in animation

Québec comics have alternately flourished and languished, seeing several brief periods of intense activity followed by long periods of inundation with foreign content. Comics first appeared in the humour pages of newspapers in the 19th century, following the trends coming from Europe. In the late 19th century, Henri Julien published two books of political caricatures, L'album drolatique du journal Le Farceur, after which the number of cartoonists began to increase in newspapers in Québec City and Montreal. 1904 saw, in the newspaper La Patrie, the publication of Les Aventures de Timothée (The Adventures of Timothée) by Albéric Bourgeois. This is said to be the first French-language comic to feature speech balloons. Joseph Charlebois's comic-strip adaptation of Le Père Ladébauche (Father Debauchery) also debuted in 1904, in La Presse, a popular strip that would last until 1957.

Raoul Barré had the first comic strip to appear in a Québec daily newspaper in 1902, called "Pour un dîner de Noël" ("For a Christmas Dinner"). In 1912, he created a strip called Noahzark Hotel for the New York-based McClure Syndicate, which he brought to La Patrie in French the next year. Soon after he moved into animation, becoming an innovative pioneer in the field.

Québécois cartoonists would propose a number of strips to compete with the American strips that dominated the Sundays and dailies. The native Québec presence on those pages would become more dominant after 1940, however, with the introduction of the War Exchange Conservation Act, which restricted the import of foreign strips. Albert Chartier created the comical character Onésime in 1943, a strip that would have the longest run of any in Québec. After World War II, during the Great Darkness, comics publication became dominated with religious comics, most of which were imported from the US. Native Québec comics did flourish for a brief period between 1955 and 1960, however, but were soon replaced again with American content, while also facing competition from the new Franco-Belgian publications, which appeared in full-colour, and by the mid-1960s had put the local Catholic publications out of business.

==== Springtime of BDQ (1970s–present) ====
The revolutionary 1960s and the Quiet Revolution in Québec saw a new vigour in BDQ. What Georges Raby called the Spring of Québécois comics (printemps de la BD québécoise) is said to have begun in 1968 with the creation of the group Chiendent, who published in La Presse and Dimanche-Magazine. Jacques Hurtubise (Zyx), Réal Godbout, Gilles Thibault, and Jacques Boivin were particularly notable cartoonists, and numerous short-lived publications with strange names appeared, like Ma®de in Québec and L'Hydrocéphale illustré. The comics no longer focused on younger audiences, instead seeking confrontation or experimenting with graphics, drawing influence from French comics for mature audiences like those published in Pilote magazine, as well as translations of American undergrounds, translations of which were published in the journal Mainmise. During the 1970s, BDQ were sometimes called "BDK", bande dessinée kébécoise.

In 1979, Jacques Hurtubise, Pierre Huet and Hélène Fleury would establish the long-lived, satirical Croc, which published many leading talents of the era, many of whom were able to launch their careers through the magazine's help. Croc begat another magazine, Titanic, dedicated to comic strips, and in 1987, Safarir, a Mad-like publication patterned after the French Hara-Kiri, rose in competition with Croc. By the mid-1980s, a number of professional comics publishers began to flourish.

In Montreal in the 1980s and 1990s, in parallel to mainstream humour magazines, a healthy underground scene developed, and self-published fanzines proliferated. Julie Doucet, Henriette Valium, Luc Giard, Éric Thériault, Gavin McInnes and Siris were among the names that were discovered in the small press publications.

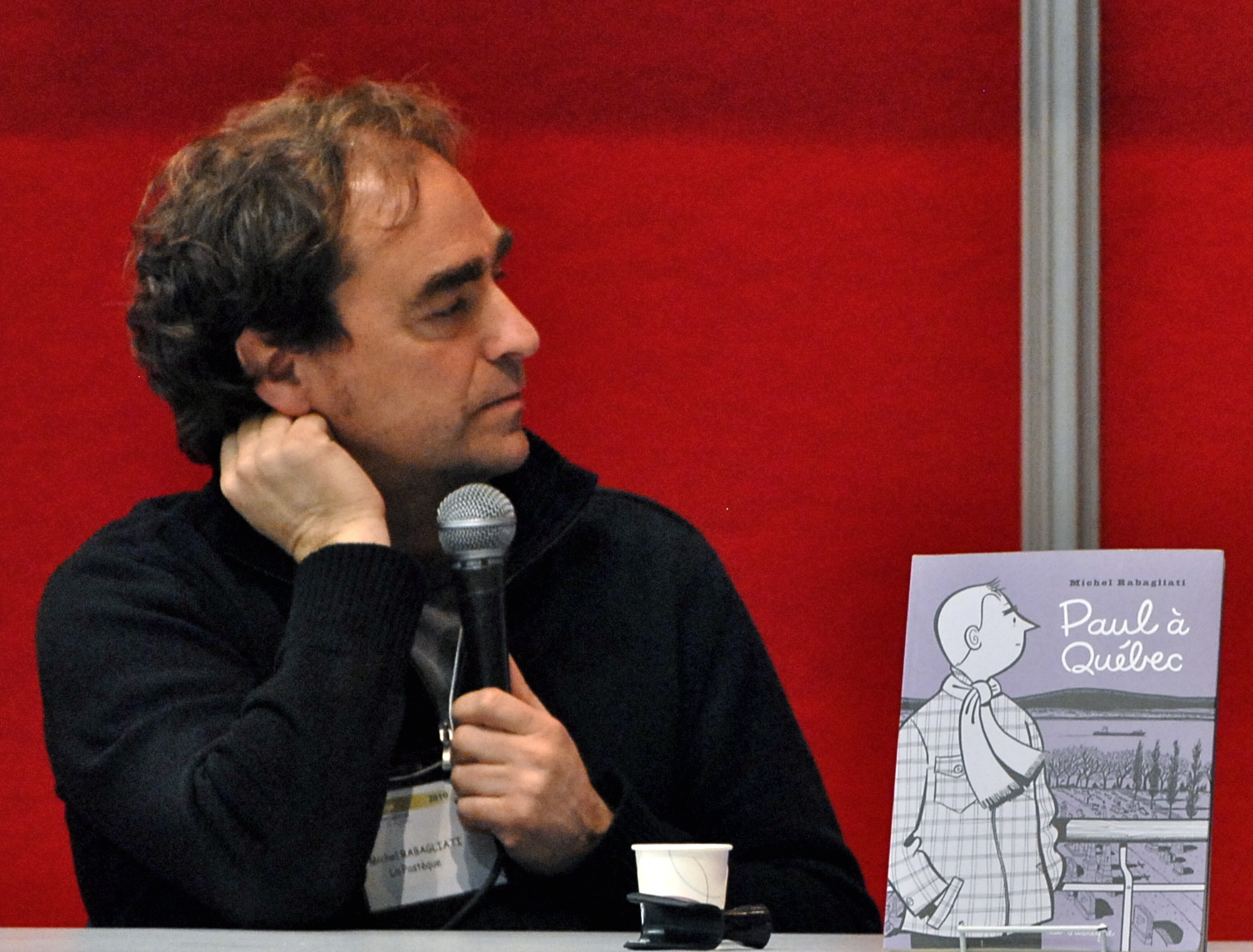
Michel Rabagliati's semi-autobiographical comics have had international success, in French and in translation

In the 21st century, Michel Rabagliati and his semi-autobiographical Paul series has seen Tintin-like sales levels in Québec, and his books have been published in English by Drawn & Quarterly.

Around the turn of the century, the government of Québec mandated La Fondation du 9e art ("The 9th Art Foundation") to promote francophone cartoonists in North America. There have also emerged events such as the Festival de la bande dessinée francophone de Québec in Québec City and la Zone internationale du neuvième art (ZINA).

== Publication, promotion and distribution ==
As in the US, large Canadian newspapers typically have a page of comic strips in their daily editions and a full-colour Sunday comics section on Saturdays or Sundays. Editorial cartoonists are also common; the Association of Canadian Editorial Cartoonists is a professional association founded in 1988 to promote their interests.

There are a number of English- and French-language publishers active in Canadian comics. Drawn & Quarterly is a Montreal-based English-language publisher of arts comics, translations, and classic comic reprints. Founded by Chris Oliveros in 1990, Drawn & Quarterly is one of the most influential publishers in alternative comics. Arcana Studio of British Columbia publishes a large number of titles, and Koyama Press joined the fray in 2007. In French, Les 400 coups, Mécanique Générale, La Pastèque and the Québec arm of Glénat are amongst the active publishers. The small press has played an important rôle; self-publishing is a common means of putting out comics, largely influenced by the success of Dave Sim's Cerebus. Minicomics is another form that has remained popular since the 1980s, when Chester Brown and Julie Doucet got started by distributing self-published photocopied comics. The minicomics scene has been spurred on by Broken Pencil, a magazine dedicated to promoting the zines.

A number of fan conventions are held throughout Canada, including the Central Canada Comic Con, Fan Expo Canada, Montreal Comiccon, Paradise Comics Toronto Comicon, Ottawa Comiccon, and Toronto Comicon. The Toronto Comic Arts Festival (TCAF), modeled after European festivals such as Angoulême and the American Small Press Expo, has grown since 2003, and since 2009 has enjoyed the support of the Toronto Public Library.

=== Awards ===
A number of awards for Canadian comics and cartooning have appeared, especially since the beginning of the 21st century.

The National Newspaper Awards was established in 1949 with a category for Editorial Cartooning honouring those that "embody an idea made clearly apparent, good drawing, and striking pictorial effect in the public interest". The award's first recipient was Jack Booth of The Globe and Mail.

The Bédélys Prize (French: Prix Bédélys) has been awarded to French-language comics since 2000. It comes with bursaries for the Prix Bédélys Québec (for Best Book from Québec) and Prix Bédélys Fanzine.

Since 2005 the Joe Shuster Awards have been handed out by the Canadian Comic Book Creator Awards Association, named after the Toronto-born co-creator of Superman. It is open to all Canadians, including those living abroad, as well as permanent residents, for comics in any language. Along with awards for Outstanding Cartoonist, Outstanding Writer, Outstanding Artist and others, it also features the Joe Shuster Hall of Fame, and the Harry Kremer Retailer Award, named after the founder of Canada's oldest surviving comic shop.

The Doug Wright Awards also began in 2005. Awards are given for Best Book, Best Emerging Talent, and since 2008 the Pigskin Peters Award for non-narrative (or nominally-narrative) comics; Pigskin Peters was a character in Jimmy Frise's Birdseye Center. The Doug Wright Awards also inducts cartoonists into Giants of the North: The Canadian Cartoonist Hall of Fame.

== Academia ==
From the 1990s onward an increasing amount of literature on Canadian comics has appeared, in both official languages. Books such as Guardians of the North (1992) and Invaders from the North (2006) appeared by comics historian John Bell, who became senior archivist at Library and Archives Canada in Ottawa. American magazine Alter Ego ran a special issue on Canadian comics in 2004. In French, Michel Viau wrote a book on francophone comics called BDQ: Répertoire des publications de bandes dessinées au Québec des origines à nos jours (2000). Bart Beaty and Jeet Heer have been writing about comics academically and professionally, and regularly have articles educating the public on comics published in newspapers such as the National Post and the Boston Globe, as well as comics and literary magazines. Canadian feminist scholars such as Mary Louise Adams, Mona Gleason, and Janice Dickin McGinnis have done research into the anti-crime comics campaigns of the late 1940s and 1950s, from the point of view of the moral panic and social and legal history of the era, and the sociology of sexuality.

== Notable Archival and Library Collections, Initiatives ==
=== Library and Archives Canada ===
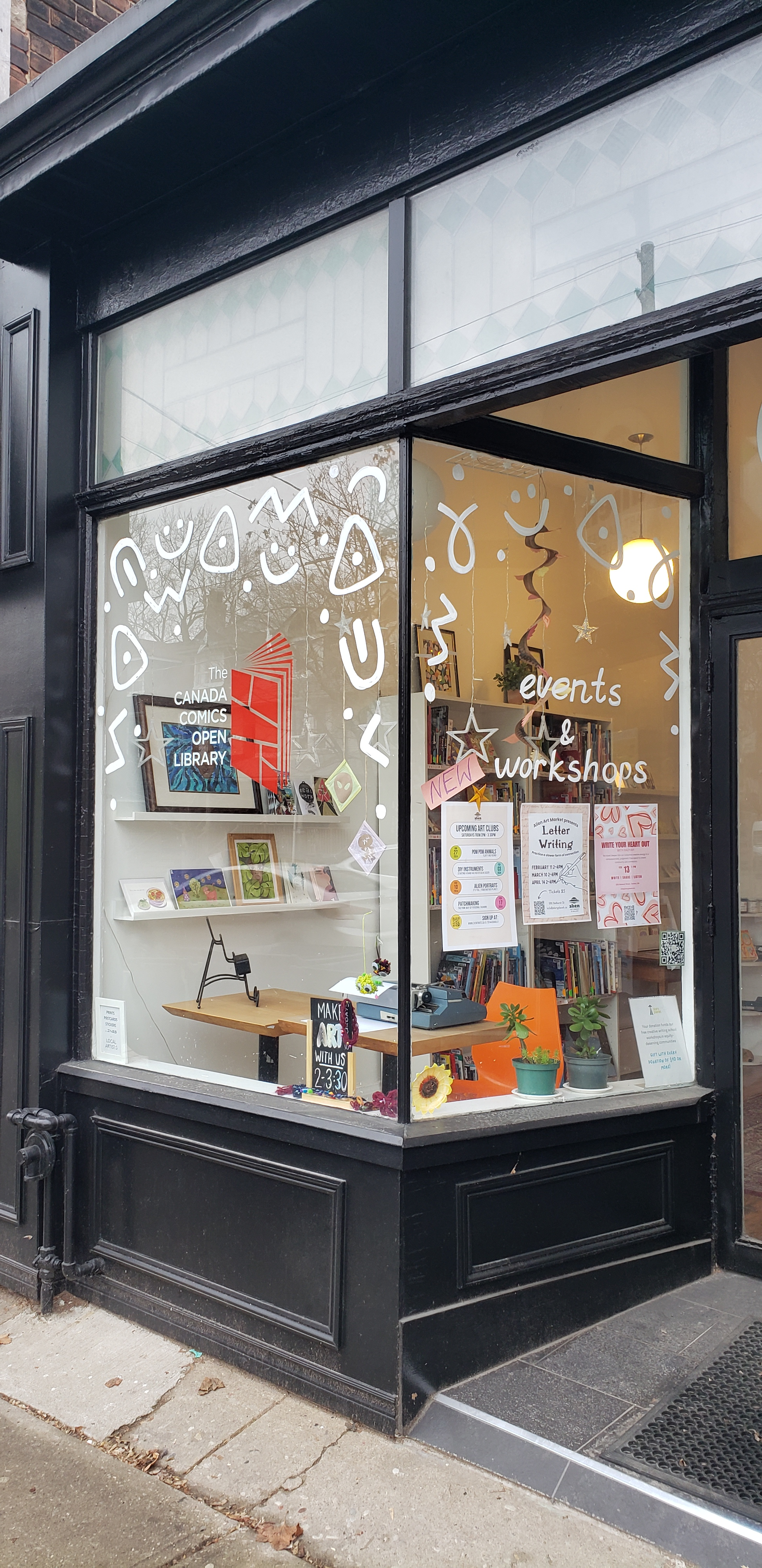
The Canada Comics Open Library in Toronto uses an original cataloguing system designed specifically for comics.

Library and Archives Canada has one of the largest collections of comic books in the country, including the John Bell Canadian Comic Book Collection, donated by historian and archivist John Bell, and the Bell Features Collection, from the corporate archive of Toronto-based publisher Bell Features.

=== Canada Comics Open Library ===
The Canada Comics Open Library was incorporated in April 2018 and opened its first branch in Toronto in March 2019. It is an entirely volunteer run non-profit organization that seeks to create a public space to feature Canadian comics, especially work by underrepresented creators. CCOL is a lending library for members, and also hosts the Comics Creators Residency which supports Canadian comics creators through funding from the Toronto Arts Council. The CCOL is notable for its use of an open-source library system customized to emphasize the discoverability of comics. CCOL has also invented a unique cataloguing system intended to display the scope of the comic book medium, in opposition to common library classification systems like Library of Congress Classification or Dewey Decimal Classification, which group comics of all genres together.

=== Canadian Cartoonists Database ===
The Canadian Cartoonists Database, a project of the Canada Comics Open Library, is a searchable directory of Canadian comics creators, which features over a thousand entries and serves as a tool for "publishers, researchers, and educators."

== See also ==
- List of Canadian comics creators
- Canadian humour
- Culture of Canada
- Comic book collecting
- Comics! was a Canadian television program
- History of Canadian animation
- Prisoners of Gravity
