= Anglo-American Publishing =

Defunct Canadian comic book publisher

- Founded: March 1941
- Defunct: 1951; 75 years ago
- Country of origin: Canada
- Headquarters location: Toronto, Ontario, Canada
- Publication types: Comic books

Anglo-American Publishing was a Canadian comic book publisher during the World War II era. While they published a number of Canadian creations, they also printed Canadian reworkings of scripts bought from American publisher Fawcett Comics.

As of 2017, Anglo-American characters have begun appearing in Chapterhouse Comics publications, later acquired by Lev Gleason Publications.

== History ==
American comic books were barred from crossing the border into Canada when the War Exchange Conservation Act passed in December 1940. In order to fill in the void and supply Canadian kids' appetite for comic books, Anglo-American and Maple Leaf Publishing started publishing comics in March 1941.

In 1941, Anglo-American Publishing hired Doris Slater, the first female cartoonist in Canada. Slater worked on multiple titles for Anglo-American, including Pat The Air Cadet.

Anglo-American's first title that March was Robin Hood and Company, a tabloid-sized publication which reprinted comic strips, chief amongst them Robin Hood and Company by Toronto Telegram's Ted McCall, which had run in Canadian newspapers since 1935.

== Characters ==
Amongst Anglo-American's characters were:

- Circus Capers
- Clip Thomson & Tub
- Commander Steel
- The Crusaders: Bob Crawford, Paul Leighton and Lois Leighton
- Doctor Destine and Rugged
- Don Shield and His Revrso-Ray
- Freelance, Big John Collins, and Natasha
- Martin Blake The Animal King
- Men of the Mounted
- Michael Lee British Secret Service
- Pat The Air Cadet
- Purple Rider and Purple Kid
- Red Rover and Knuckles
- Robin Hood and his band
- Sooper Dooper
- Terry Kane

== See also ==
- Canadian comics
- Golden Age of Comic Books
- Hillborough Studios
- Bell Features
