= Maple Leaf Publishing =

Defunct Canadian comics publisher

Coordinates: 49.3°N 123.1°W

- Status: Defunct (c. 1946)
- Founded: March 1941
- Country of origin: Canada
- Headquarters location: Vancouver, British Columbia, Canada
- Publication types: Comic books

Maple Leaf Publishing was a World War II-era Canadian comic book publisher active during the Golden Age of Comic Books. They were one of four publishers—along with Anglo-American Publishing, Hillborough Studios, and Commercial Signs of Canada (later renamed Bell Features)—which published "Canadian Whites", black-and-white comic books with colour covers that proliferated during the war years when American imports were restricted. Maple Leaf Publishing started publishing comic books in March 1941 and went out of business when the restrictions were lifted after the end of World War II.

== History ==
Canada declared war on Germany on September 10, 1939, entering World War II. In December 1940, with Canada's trade deficit with the still-neutral United States growing, the government passed the War Exchange Conservation Act, which restricted the importing of non-essential goods—including comic books—from the United States.

Four Canadian publishers, Maple Leaf, Anglo-American Publishing, Hillborough Studios, and Commercial Signs of Canada (later renamed Bell Features), independently emerged to take advantage of the legislation. While the other three were based in Toronto, Maple Leaf called Vancouver home. Maple Leaf and the larger Anglo-American published their first comic books in March 1941, the others following later in the year.

In contrast to the larger Anglo-American, which for example bought American Captain Marvel scripts and simply had them redrawn by Canadians, Maple Leaf focused on home-grown, 100% original material. Maple Leaf's first publication, Better Comics #1, is thus considered to be the first true Canadian comic book. It is also credited with the first Canadian superhero, Iron Man, debuting in March 1941 in the first issue of Better Comics, preceding Stan Lee and Jack Kirby's unrelated superhero of the same name by over two decades.

Maple Leaf's comics were modeled on the American regular comic format, minus the colour interiors. Other notable titles Maple Leaf published include Big Bang Comics, Lucky Comics and Rocket Comics.

However, with the end of World War II in 1945, American comics were once again dominant in Canada; Maple Leaf, Anglo-American and Bell tried to compete post-war, but failed.

== Titles published ==
- Better Comics (34 issues, March 1941 - August/September 1946)
- Bing Bang Comics (31 issues, November–December 1941 - May–June 1946)
- Lucky Comics (34 issues, June 1941 - October–November 1946)
- Name-It Comics (1 issue, November/December 1941)
- Rocket Comics (32 issues, 1941–1946)
