= Johnny Canuck =

National personification of Canada

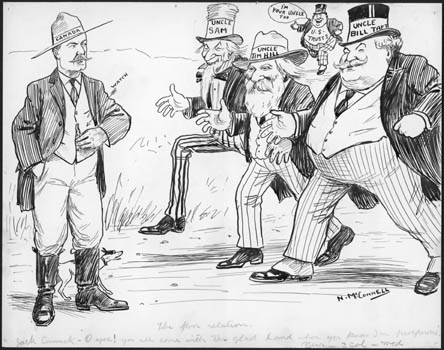
An editorial cartoon, c. 1910, portraying Johnny Canuck

A portrayal c. 1942 of Johnny Canuck as a World War II hero

Johnny Canuck is a Canadian cartoon hero and superhero who was created as a political cartoon in 1869 and was later re-invented as a Second World War action hero in 1942. The Vancouver Canucks, a professional ice hockey team in the National Hockey League (NHL), currently use a hockey playing "Johnny Canuck" logo as one of their team logos. In addition, the Vancouver Canucks' American Hockey League affiliate, the Abbotsford Canucks, use it as their main logo.

== Political cartoon ==
Johnny Canuck is a fictional lumberjack and a national personification of Canada. He first appeared in early political cartoons dating to 1869 where he was portrayed as a younger cousin of the United States' Uncle Sam and Britain's John Bull. Dressed as a habitant, farmer, logger, rancher or soldier, he was characterized as wholesome and simple-minded and was often depicted resisting the bullying of John Bull or Uncle Sam. He appeared regularly in editorial cartoons for 30 years before declining in usage in the early twentieth century.

== Comic book hero ==
The character re-emerged during World War II in the February 1942 issue of Bell Features' Dime Comics #1. Cartoonist Leo Bachle created the character as a teenager, apparently on a challenge from a Bell executive. Initially, Johnny Canuck had no superpowers. Johnny Canuck's cartoon exploits helped Canada fight against Nazism. Like Captain America, he met Adolf Hitler and almost single-handedly ended the war.

The use of such stock figures diminished in popularity after World War II, but in 1975, a new comic book character, Captain Canuck, emerged. Created by Richard Comely (who at the time was unaware of the earlier Johnny Canuck character), Captain Canuck was a costumed superhero rather than just a hero, and he wore red and white tights and bore a red maple leaf emblazoned on the forehead of his mask.

In 1995, Canada Post issued a series of Canadian postage stamps celebrating Canada's comic-book superheroes. Johnny Canuck is depicted as he appeared in the comic books, dressed in flight jacket, goggles, leather headgear and boots. Johnny Canuck is linked to a tradition of stalwart, honest, upstanding Canadian heroes.

Ty Templeton and Moonstone Books resurrected the character in a comic originally called Johnny Canuck and the Guardians of the Northern Lights and then re-titled The Northern Guard, which published two issues in December 2010 and March 2011.

== Vancouver Canucks ==
Johnny Canuck, by Harold Berndt Dec 1996.

In the mid-20th century, the Vancouver Canucks, a major professional ice hockey team of the Pacific Coast Hockey League and later Western Hockey League, used a lumberjack character inspired by a Dawson Creek BC senior hockey teams logo. When the Canucks moved to the National Hockey League in 1970, they discontinued the lumberjack logo, in favour of the "Stick-in-Rink" logo.

In the mid-1990s, Harold Berndt, the former director of marketing and assistant general manager for the major junior Western Hockey League's New Westminster Bruins, visited the BC Sports Hall of Fame. He obtained a photo of the vintage 1950s logo, originally inspired by a Dawson Creek BC team, and by the 1960s had begun to be referred to by fans as "Johnny Canuck". He created the first major redesign and a campaign for "Johnny Canuck" to become the Vancouver Canucks' new logo, Berndt released his logo redesign to the internet by December 1996 advocating that "Johnny Canuck" would make the best new logo for the Vancouver Canucks.

In October 1999, Kevin Sander applied for a "Johnny Canuck" logo as a trademark and subsequently sold a similar modified version to the Canucks.

In 2006, a vintage-inspired goaltender mask worn by Canucks' goaltender Roberto Luongo featured the older style "Johnny Canuck" logo. The following season, Luongo's new mask once again featured a "Johnny Canuck", but more prominently than his previous design. Beginning in 2008–09, the Canucks introduced "Johnny Canuck" on the shoulder patch of their third jersey. The full body Johnny Canuck logo was then recreated by graphic designer Evan Biswanger in 2009.

In 2021, "Johnny Canuck" logo became the logo for new AHL farm team, the Abbotsford Canucks, in Abbotsford, British Columbia.

In October 2022, the Canucks revealed their reverse retro jersey which featured Johnny Canuck as the logo.

== Stage play by Ken Gass ==
In 1974, Toronto's Factory Theatre staged a play based on the Johnny Canuck character, written by Ken Gass and entitled "Hurray for Johnny Canuck".

== See also ==
- Captain Canuck
- Canuck
- Northguard
