= Bell Features =

Defunct Canadian comic book publisher

- Status: Defunct (1953)
- Founded: September 1941
- Country of origin: Canada
- Headquarters location: Toronto, Ontario, Canada
- Key people: Cy Bell, Gene Bell, Edmund Legault, John Ezrin
- Publication types: Comic books

Bell Features, also known as Commercial Signs of Canada, was a Canadian comic book publisher during the World War II era. They were the most successful of the publishers of "Canadian Whites", and published comics such as Adrian Dingle's Nelvana of the Northern Lights.

Founded in 1939 as a commercial art business, the company found success when it started publishing comics in September 1941, and changed its name to Bell Features in 1942. It folded in 1953 under increasing competition from American publishers.

== History ==
Brothers Gene and Cy Bell ran a commercial art business in Toronto called Commercial Signs of Canada. They had previously been approached by Edmund Legault, who was looking for a publishing outlet for his comic books. When the War Exchange Conservation Act passed in December 1940, the importation of American comic books was cut off. Cy Bell saw an opportunity and contacted Legault. With capital invested by John Ezrin, the result was Wow Comics in September 1941 a colour comic which soon switched to the black-and-white format common at the time that became known amongst collectors as "Canadian Whites". More titles were added, including Active, Commando, Dime, The Funny Comics and Joke. The comics initially carried the Commercial Signs label, but switched to labeling them as Bell Features in 1942.

In April 1942, the company picked up Adrian Dingle from his own Hillborough Studios. He brought with him most of the Hillborough staff, as well as his popular Nelvana of the Northern Lights, one of the earliest female superheroes in North America, who was inspired by Inuit legends.

Canada's second superhero, Leo Bachle's Johnny Canuck, appeared in Dime Comics #1 in February 1942. Bachle had been spotted by Ezrin in late 1941, when he was 16. Ezrin asked for Bachle's opinion on the Bell comics he was browsing, and Bachle was critical of them. Ezrin challenged him to draw two men fighting, and the results were impressive enough that Ezrin invited him to come up with a character and bring it to the Bell offices the next day. Johnny Canuck was a hit, and Bachle's talents were considerable enough that he was snatched up by New York publishers in 1944. Johnny Canuck's serial adventures continued with art by André Kulbach and Paul Dak.

Other characters that were popular for the company were another Dingle creation called the Penguin (no relation to the Batman villain), Legault's Dixon of the Mounted, Jerry Lazare's Phantom Rider, Edmond Good's Rex Baxter, and Fred Kelly's Doc Stearne.

Bell was the most prolific of the Canadian publishers, issuing nearly twenty titles, and its comics were a big success, achieving combined weekly sales of 100,000 copies by the end of 1943. Bell provided work for over fifty freelance creators, including René Kulbach, Ted Steele, Manny Easson, Jack Tremblay, Mel Crawford, Lou Skuce, Doris Slater and Patricia Joudrey.

After the war ended in 1945, trade restrictions were loosened, and American comics once again flooded the Canadian market. With better distribution, colour interiors and glossy covers, Canadian publishers found it hard to compete in such a small market. Nelvana's last issue came out in 1947, and Bell ceased operations in 1953.

== See also ==
- Canadian comics
- Maple Leaf Publishing
