= The Sovereigns =

Comic book series

Publication information
- Publisher: Dynamite Entertainment
- Schedule: Monthly
- Format: Limited series
- Genre: Superhero
- Publication date: April 6 – September 2017
- No. of issues: 5 (plus a 0 issue)
- Main character(s): Dagar the Invincible; Doctor Spektor; Lorn; Magnus; Mighty Samson; Solar; Tragg; Turok

Creative team
- Written by: Aubrey Sitterson; Chuck Wendig; Kyle Higgins; Ray Fawkes
- Artist(s): Alvaro Sarraseca; Dylan Burnett; Johnny Desjardins; Jorge Fornes

The Sovereigns is a comic book limited series published by Dynamite Entertainment, which started running from May 7, 2017, with the prelude issue published on April 6, 2017. The series is written by Aubrey Sitterson, Chuck Wendig, Kyle Higgins and Ray Fawkes, and drawn by Alvaro Sarraseca, Dylan Burnett, Johnny Desjardins and Jorge Fornes.

The Sovereigns is set in an alternate reality to the universe of Gold Key Comics, and features characters like Turok, Magnus, Solar, Doctor Spektor, Mighty Samson, Dagar the Invincible, Tragg and Lorn.

== Plot ==
Set between 2025 and 2525, on the verge of a post-apocalyptic future, a group of heroes known "The Sovereigns" must reunite to face a threat that will forever change their legacy and bring them face to face with their final destiny.
