= Gold Key: Alliance =

Comic book series

Publication information
- Publisher: Dynamite Entertainment
- Schedule: Monthly
- Format: Limited series
- Genre: Superhero
- Publication date: April 6 – August 17, 2016
- No. of issues: 5
- Main character(s): Doctor Spektor; Magnus; Mighty Samson; Solar; Turok

Creative team
- Written by: Phil Hester
- Artist(s): Brent Peeples
- Letterer(s): Simon Bowland
- Colorist(s): Morgan Hickman

Collected editions
- December 27, 2016: ISBN 1524101648

Gold Key: Alliance is a comic book limited series published by Dynamite Entertainment, which ran from April 6 to August 17, 2016. The series featured five Gold Key Comics characters: Magnus, Mighty Samson, Solar, Doctor Spektor and Turok.

== Premise ==
In a present day similar to the real world, there are alternate counterparts of four Gold Key original characters who co-exist but live different lives: Magnus is a secret agent monitoring the rise of military artificial intelligence and robotics around the globe, Turok is a reality television star and tribal park ranger in charge of some rare unique specimens, Samson is a homeless man ranting at unseen monsters on the streets of Manhattan, and Solar is a young female doctor on a mission of mercy in an impoverished part of Africa. But one day, each of them is hunted by an alternate counterpart of Doctor Spektor, who warns them about the upcoming destruction of the multiverse.

== Trade paperback ==
- Gold Key: Alliance (120 pages, paperback, December 27, 2016, 1524101648 / 978-1524101640)
