= John Celardo =

American cartoonist (1918–2012)

- Born: December 27, 1918 New York City, U.S.
- Died: January 6, 2012 (aged 93) New York City, U.S.
- Area: Artist
- Notable works: Tarzan comic strip

John Celardo (December 27, 1918 – January 6, 2012) was an American comic strip and comic book artist, best known for illustrating the Tarzan comic strip.

== Early life ==
Born on Staten Island, New York City, Celardo continued to live there most of his life. After a childhood in Mariners Harbor, he graduated from Port Richmond High School. He began his art career in the late 1930s drawing animals for the National Youth Administration at the Staten Island Zoo at West Brighton, where he was once photographed in the alligator pit by the Staten Island Advance.

== World War II ==
Serving with the U. S. Army during World War II, he was assigned to duty in the European theatre, where he rose to the rank of captain. Returning to Staten Island after World War II, he lived in Castleton Corners and eventually settled in Graniteville.

In addition to art study with the Federal School's correspondence course, his extensive art training was at New York's Art Students League, the School of Industrial Arts and the School of Visual Arts.

== Comic books ==
After creating sports cartoons for Street & Smith magazines, he began drawing for comic books, including a job at the Eisner & Iger shop. During the 1940s, he was an assistant art director and a major contributor to the Fiction House line, notably for Wings Comics. Over decades, he did work for a variety of publishers, including American Comics Group, DC Comics, Gold Key Comics, Quality Comics, Standard Comics, St. John Publications, and Whitman Comics. After 1969, his comic book work was primarily for DC Comics and Gold Key Comics.

== Comic strips ==
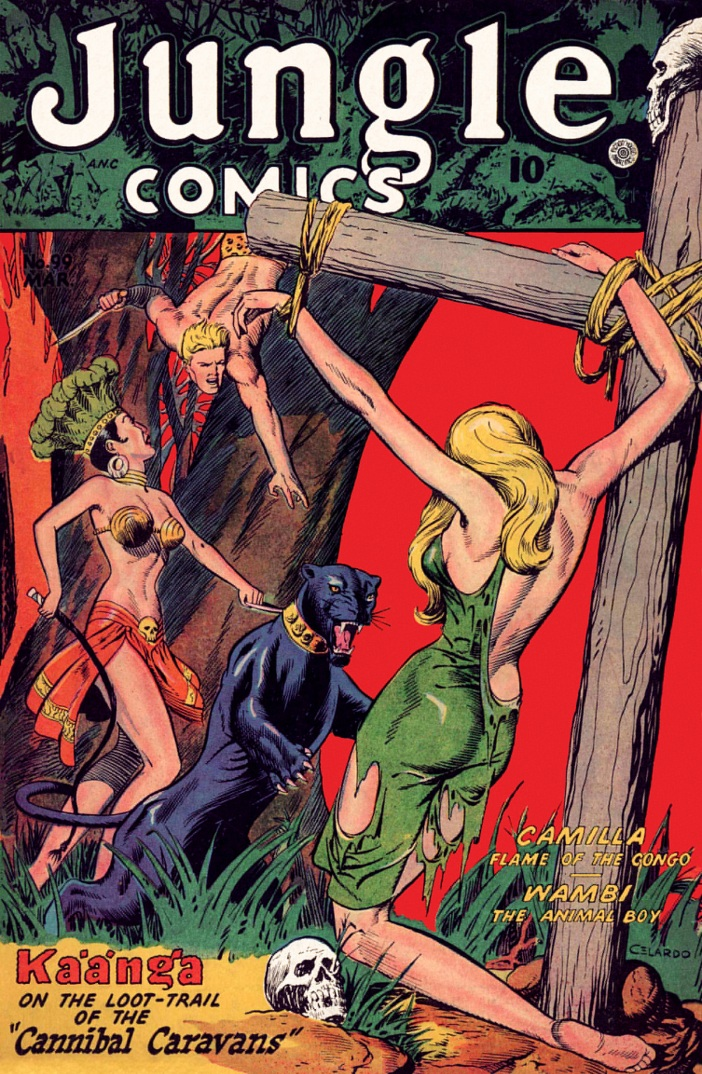
John Celardo's cover for Jungle Comics #99 (March 1948)

In the early 1950s, he succeeded Bob Lubbers as illustrator of the Tarzan comic strip. He began the Tarzan daily strip on January 18, 1954, and the Sunday strip on February 28, 1954, eventually drawing a total of 4350 daily strips and 724 Sunday strips. His work was then appearing in 225 newspapers in 12 different countries. Celardo continued on Tarzan until January 7, 1968, when Russ Manning took it over. Celardo then succeeded Joe Kubert on Tales of the Green Beret. In the late 1960s, he developed a Lassie newspaper strip, based on the still-popular TV series of the same name. According to John Wells, the newspaper strip was published and started on April 7, 1969. No end date is known. He drew the daily Buz Sawyer comic strip from 1983 until it was discontinued on October 7, 1989. His works on the Tarzan comics were among the first to be banned by the Federal Department for Media Harmful to Young Persons of then-West Germany, who supposedly insulted him by stating that he has a "degenerate imagination".

During the 1960s, he also did artwork for Topps trading cards, including a comic strip on their Land of the Giants card series. In 1969, he illustrated Paperback Library's Get Your Shape in Shape by Rita Chazen and Fran Hair. From 1973 to the mid-1990s, he was a comics editor at King Features Syndicate.

One of the artists interviewed by David Hajdu for Hajdu's authoritative survey of the comic book industry, The Ten-Cent Plague: The Great Comic-Book Scare and How It Changed America, Celardo was a member of Artists and Writers, the National Cartoonists Society and the Staten Island Kiwanis Club.

== Death ==
At age 93, Celardo died on January 6, 2012, at Clove Lakes Health Care and Rehabilitation Center in Staten Island, survived by his son, John J.; his wife, the former Julia Esposito; his daughter, Donna DeForest; three brothers Joe, Frank and Edward; and three grandchildren Ryan DeForest, Kaitlin DeForest, and Devin DeForest.

== Bibliography ==
=== DC Comics ===
- All Star Comics #48 (1949)
- Aquaman #60 (1978)
- Army at War #1 (1978)
- Batman #333 (1981)
- Batman Family #16, 20 (1978)
- Challengers of the Unknown #83–87 (1977–1978)
- Claw the Unconquered #10–11 (1978)
- Detective Comics #479, 485 (1978–1979)
- Falling in Love #36, 43, 46, 124 (1960–1971)
- Ghosts #94, 107–108 (1980–1981)
- Girls' Love Stories #77, 79, 81, 91, 117, 179 (1961–1973)
- Girls' Romances #68, 70, 75, 138 (1960–1969)
- Green Lantern #107, 120 (1978–1979)
- Hawk and the Dove #6 (1969)
- Heart Throbs #68, 75, 120, 125 (1960–1970)
- House of Mystery 187, 264, 266, 282–284, 291, 293, 296, 301, 308, 316 (1970–1983)
- Mystery in Space #111, 113–116 (1980–1981)
- Secret Hearts #51, 56–57, 62–63, 77, 109–110, 126, 140–141, 143–145, 149–150, 153 (1958–1971)
- Secrets of Haunted House #33, 41 (1981)
- The Superman Family #191–192 (1978)
- Tarzan #212 (1972)
- Time Warp #3, 5 (1979–1980)
- The Unexpected #222 (1982)
- Unknown Soldier #238, 247, 249 (1980–1981)
- Weird War Tales #75, 78, 84, 91, 93, 102, 107–109 (1979–1982)
- Who's Who: The Definitive Directory of the DC Universe #4 (1985)
- The Witching Hour #6 (1970)
- Young Love #112 (1974)
- Young Romance #164, 166, 170 (1970–1971)

=== Fiction House ===
- Fight Comics 3–8 (1940)
- Jungle Comics #102 (1948)

=== Gold Key Comics ===
- Boris Karloff Tales of Mystery #19, 25–34, 36, 38–40, 42, 44–51, 54–55, 58–63, 68, 72, 77–78, 81, 85, 89, 92, 96–97 (1967–1980)
- Golden Comics Digest #4 (1969)
- Grimm's Ghost Stories #1, 3–4, 10, 16–19, 26, 28, 30–31, 34, 36, 42–43, 45, 57, 60 (1972–1982)
- Judge Colt #1–3 (1969–1970)
- Mighty Samson #26–27 (1974–1975)
- Mystery Comics Digest #10, 13, 16–19, 21–23, 25–26 (1973–1975)
- The Phantom #8 (1964)
- Ripley's Believe It or Not! #15–16, 19–20, 22–30, 37, 46, 49, 55, 59–60, 63, 71, 78, 85, 93 (1969–1979)
- Ripley's Believe It or Not! True Ghost Stories #11401 (1979)
- Shadow Play #1 (1982)
- Shroud of Mystery #1 (1982)
- The Twilight Zone #34, 36–37, 39, 41, 43–45, 47, 52, 54–56, 71, 79, 83–84 (1970–1978)
- UFO & Outer Space #14, 25 (1978–1980)
- UFO Encounters #11192 (1978)
- UFO Flying Saucers #2–3, 7, 9, 13 (1970–1977)
- UFO Mysteries #11400 (1978)

=== Quality Comics ===
- Doll Man #10 (1946)
- Feature Comics #34, 38–43 (1940–1941)
- Hit Comics #4–10 (1940–1941)
- National Comics #1–9, 19–20 (1940–1941)
- Smash Comics #19–20 (1940–1941)

=== Standard Comics ===
- Adventures into Darkness #5, 11 (1952–1953)

=== Ziff Davis ===
- G.I. Joe #11 (1951)
- Kid Cowboy #2–4 (1950–1951)
- Weird Adventures #10 (1951)
- Weird Thrillers #3 (1952)
