= Jesse Santos =

Filipino cartoonist (1928–2013)

- Born: June 24, 1928 Teresa, Rizal, Philippines
- Died: April 27, 2013 (aged 84) Pacoima, Los Angeles, California, U.S.
- Areas: Penciller, inker
- Notable works: Dagar the Invincible; The Occult Files of Dr. Spektor; Tragg and the Sky Gods

Jesse Santos (June 24, 1928 – April 27, 2013) was a Filipino comics artist. He was best known as the co-creator of Dagar the Invincible and Tragg and the Sky Gods with writer Donald F. Glut.

== Biography ==
Jesse Santos was born in Teresa, Rizal, the Philippines, and began drawing professionally at the age of 14. One of his artistic influences was Francisco Coching. His other influences include Hal Foster, Burne Hogarth, Jack Kirby, Alex Raymond, and Tony Velasquez.

Santos began his career in the Komiks industry by drawing the "Kidlat" feature in Halakhak Komiks in 1946. He moved to the United States in 1969 and began working for Western Publishing's line of Gold Key Comics after a chance meeting with editors Chase Craig and Del Connell.

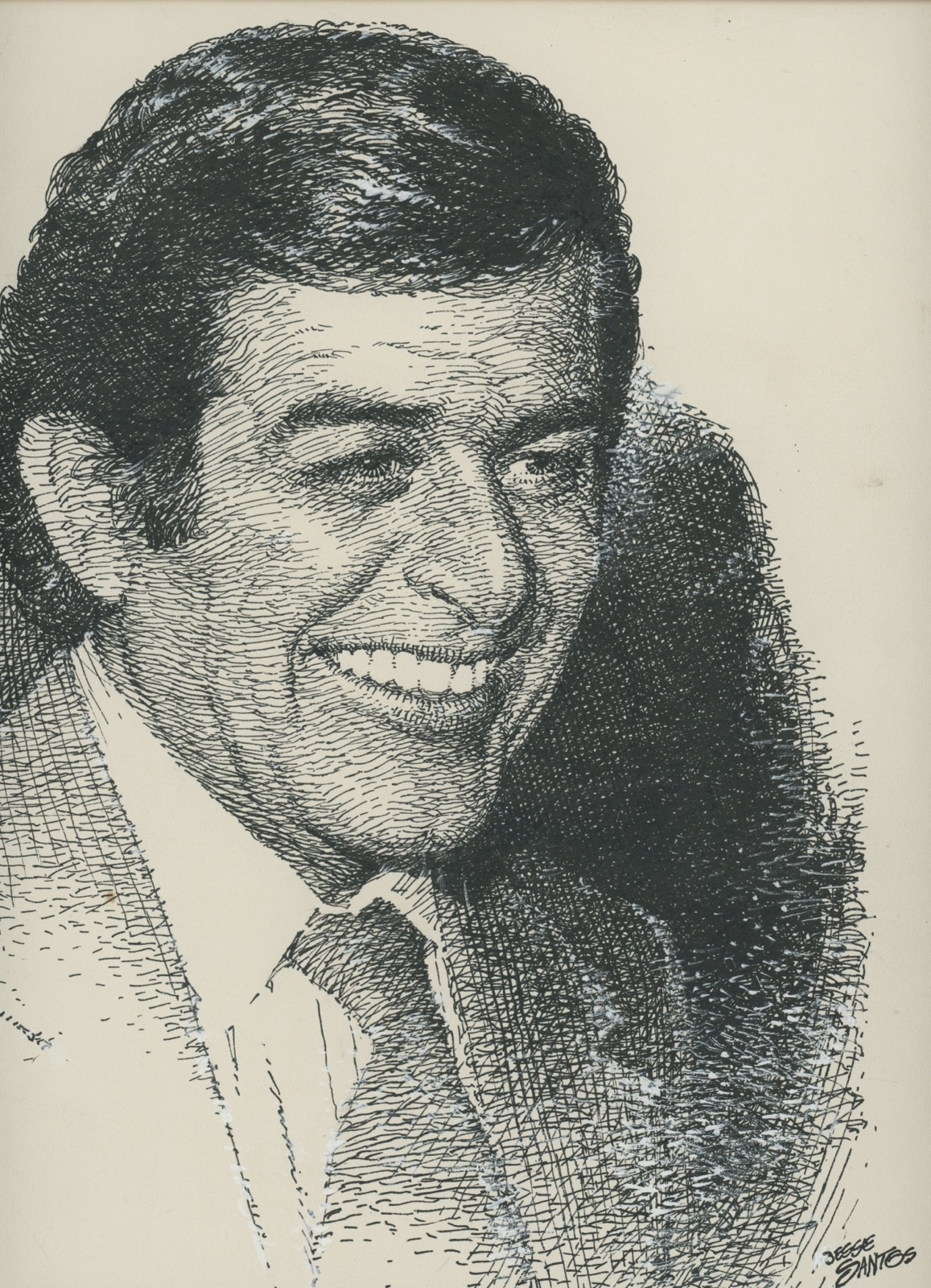
George N. Zenovich by Jesse Santos, circa 1980s.

His earliest work in the U.S. is inking Jack Sparling's penciled artwork in The Microbots #1 (Dec. 1971). He became the artist on the Brothers of the Spear series in 1972 and worked with writer Gaylord DuBois on the first 12 issues. That same year, Santos and writer Donald F. Glut co-created Dagar the Invincible and Tragg and the Sky Gods. They also collaborated on The Occult Files of Dr. Spektor. Santos received an offer from Marvel Comics to work on their Conan the Barbarian series, but turned it down.

In the 1980s, Santos left the comics industry and became involved in advertising and animation design. He worked on such series as Bionic Six, Blackstar, Dino-Riders, Jem, and Tiny Toon Adventures. After retiring in 1998, Santos often performed as a lounge singer and self-produced an album of standard love ballads.

== Bibliography ==
=== Archie Comics ===
- Archie's Super Hero Comics Digest Magazine #2 (1979)
- Mad House #96 (1974)

=== Gold Key Comics ===
- Brothers of the Spear #1–12 (1972–1975)
- Gold Key Spotlight #6, 8 (1977)
- The Microbots #1 (1971)
- Mystery Comics Digest #1–4, 7, 9–10, 12–15 (1972–1974)
- The Occult Files of Doctor Spektor #1–24 (1973–1977)
- Tales of Sword and Sorcery Featuring Dagar the Invincible #1–17 (1972–1976)
- Tragg and the Sky Gods #1–8 (1975–1977)

Preceded by n/a	Brothers of the Spear artist 1972–1975	Succeeded by Dan Spiegle
