= Total War =

Total war refers to a military conflict of unlimited scope.

Total War may also refer to:

- Total War (video game series), a video game series developed by The Creative Assembly and now published by Sega
- Total War: 2006, a 1999 book by Simon Pearson
- M.A.R.S. Patrol Total War, a comic book series initially published as Total War
- Total War speech, a 1943 speech by Joseph Goebbels
- Total War (novel), a novel in The Survivalist series by Jerry Ahern

== See also ==
- Spartan: Total Warrior, a 2006 videogame
