= Tragg =

Tragg is the name of various fictional characters:

- Police Lieutenant Arthur Tragg, in the Perry Mason TV series, played by Ray Collins
- Tragg, a Cro-Magnon in the Gold Key Comics short-lived series Tragg and the Sky Gods
- General Traag, sometimes spelled Tragg, in the Teenage Mutant Ninja Turtles universe
- Tragg, in the video game Dungeon Siege: Legends of Aranna
