= Jack Sparling =

Canadian comics artist (1916–1997)

- Born: John Edmond Sparling; June 21, 1916 Winnipeg, Manitoba, Canada
- Died: February 15, 1997 (aged 80)
- Area: Artist
- Notable works: Claire Voyant; Hap Hopper; Tiger Girl

John Edmond Sparling (June 21, 1916 – February 15, 1997) was a Canadian comics artist.

== Biography ==
Born in Winnipeg, Manitoba, Sparling moved to the United States as a child. He received his early arts training at the Arts and Crafts Club in New Orleans and later attended the Corcoran School of Art. He worked briefly as a gag cartoonist for the New Orleans Item-Tribune. In 1941, Sparling, along with writer William Laas, created the United Feature Syndicate comic strip Hap Hopper, Washington Correspondent, for which real-life newspaper columnists Drew Pearson and Robert S. Allen were listed as editors. One source lists it as having launched January 29, 1939, but comics historian Don Markstein, noting that that day was a Sunday, says January 29, 1940, is better supported and more likely. Sparling was the artist until 1943, when he was succeeded by Al Plastino.

Sparling's next comic strip was Claire Voyant, which premiered May 10, 1943, in the New York PM. and ran until 1948.

Jack Sparling's Claire Voyant (1948)

From the 1950s through the 1970s, Sparling provided art for a variety of publishers, including Harvey Comics (the Pirana) and Charlton Comics' adaptations of The Six Million Dollar Man and The Bionic Woman. Sparling also worked for Classics Illustrated, drawing adaptations of Robin Hood and Mark Twain's Connecticut Yankee in King Arthur's Court. Sparling drew biographic comic books featuring Adlai Stevenson II, Lyndon B. Johnson, and Barry Goldwater for Dell Comics. At DC Comics, Sparling drew Secret Six, the "Eclipso" feature in House of Secrets, and the "Unknown Soldier" feature in Star Spangled War Stories. Editor Joe Orlando began a new direction for DC's House of Mystery series with issue #175 (July–August 1968) and the series' host Cain was created by Sparling and Orlando with writer Bob Haney. Sparling worked with writer Dennis O'Neil on The Witching Hour and the Challengers of the Unknown. For Western Publishing's Gold Key Comics, he co-created the superhero Tiger Girl with Jerry Siegel in 1968, drew the toyline tie-in Microbots one-shot, and illustrated comic book adaptations of the television series Family Affair, The Outer Limits, and Adam-12. In 1976, he drew a licensed Welcome Back, Kotter comic book series for DC. For Charlton Comics' satire magazine Sick, he wrote and drew the nudie-cutie feature "Cher D'Flower!"

== Bibliography ==
=== DC Comics ===
- Action Comics #140 (1950)
- Batman #58 (1950)
- Beware the Creeper #6 (1969)
- Blackhawk #196 (1964)
- Bomba, the Jungle Boy #3–7 (1968)
- The Brave and the Bold #87 (1969)
- Challengers of the Unknown #64–71 (1968–1969)
- Elvira's House of Mystery Special #1 (1987)
- Falling in Love #94 (1967)
- Ghosts #5–7, 90, 93–94 (1972–1980)
- G.I. Combat #160, 170, 174, 191 (1973–1976)
- Girls' Love Stories #132, 163 (1968–1971)
- Girls' Romances #126, 129, 133–134, 140–141, 144–145, 150 (1967–1970)
- Green Lantern #62–63 (1968)
- House of Mystery #152, 154–155, 175–176, 197, 203, 205, 207, 228 (1965–1974)
- House of Secrets #68–80 (Eclipso); #81–82, 84, 86, 94–95, 97, 103 (1964–1972)
- Metamorpho #17 (1968)
- Mystery in Space #106 (1966)
- Our Army at War #189 (1968)
- Our Fighting Forces #111, 113–114 (1968)
- Phantom Stranger vol. 2 #20 (1972)
- Plastic Man #8–10 (1968)
- Secret Six #3–7 (1968–1969)
- Secrets of Haunted House #11, 32 (1978–1981)
- Secrets of Sinister House #15 (1973)
- Showcase #78 (Jonny Double) (1968)
- Spectre #9–10 (1969)
- Star Spangled War Stories #137, 165–182 (1968–1974)
- Strange Adventures #165–169, 172, 174–179, 182–183, 185–192, 194–198, 200–201, 203 (1964–1967)
- Super DC Giant #S-20 (1970)
- Tales of the Unexpected #85, 87–93, 95–96, 99–100 (1964–1967)
- The Unexpected #107–113, 124, 135, 137, 143, 205–209, 212 (1968–1981)
- Unknown Soldier #257 (1981)
- Weird Mystery Tales #4 (1973)
- Weird War Tales #22, 33–34, 36, 38, 86 (1974–1980)
- Welcome Back, Kotter #1–2 (1976–1977)
- Who's Who: The Definitive Directory of the DC Universe #20 (Secret Six) (1986)
- The Witching Hour #1–3, 13, 21, 23, 30 (1969–1973)

=== Dell Comics ===
- Adlai Stevenson #1 (1966)
- Around the World Under the Sea #30 (1966)
- Barry M. Goldwater #1 (1965)
- The Cat #109 (1966)
- Circus World #115 (1964)
- Countdown #150 (1967)
- The Courtship of Eddie's Father #1–2 (1970)
- The Dirty Dozen #180 (1967)
- Espionage #1 (1964)
- Four Color #1118, #1148, #1157, #1195, #1205, #1223, #1225, #1253, #1301, #1312 (1960–1962)
- Friday Foster #1 (1972)
- Ghost Stories #35 (1973)
- Guerrilla War #12 (1965)
- Idaho #3 (1964)
- Jules Verne's Mysterious Isle #1 (1963)
- Laramie #01-418-207 (1962)
- The Legend of Custer #1 (1968)
- Mission: Impossible #1–5 (1967–1969)
- The Monroes #1 (1967)
- The Mummy #537 (1962)
- National Velvet #01-556-207, #12-556-210 (1962)
- Naza #1–9 (1964–1966)
- Neutro #1 (1967)
- The Night of the Grizzly #558 (1966)
- None but the Brave #565 (1965)
- Operation Crossbow #590 (1965)
- The Outer Limits #1–18 (1964–1967)
- Ring of Bright Water #701 (1969)
- Robinson Crusoe #1 (1964)
- Room 222 #1–4 (1970–1971)
- Smoky #746 (1967)
- The Sons of Katie Elder #748 (1965)
- Space Man #2–10 (1962–1972)
- Stoney Burke #2 (1963)
- T.H.E. Cat #1–4 (1967)
- Turok, Son of Stone #28 (1962)
- Universal Pictures Presents Dracula, the Mummy, and Other Stories #1 (1963)
- The Valley of Gwangi #880 (1969)
- Zulu #950 (1964)

=== Gold Key Comics ===
- Adam-12 #2–10 (1974–1976)
- Bonanza #5 (1963)
- Boris Karloff Tales of Mystery #6, 31, 33–36, 38–42, 44, 48–50, 58, 67, 69–73, 76–81, 86, 91–92, 94, 96–97 (1964–1980)
- Boris Karloff Thriller #2 (1963)
- Bugs Bunny #89 (1963)
- Checkmate #1–2 (1962)
- City Surgeon #1 (1963)
- Dark Shadows #11 (1971)
- Dear Nancy Parker #1–2 (1963)
- Doc Savage #1 (1966)
- Donald Duck #88, 90 (1963)
- Family Affair #2–4 (1970)
- Gold Key Champion #2 (1978)
- Grimm's Ghost Stories #1–8, 10, 12–14, 18–20, 23–24, 28, 30–34, 36–41, 43–45, 47, 51–54, 56–60 (1972–1982)
- Honey West #1 (1966)
- Isis Golden All-Star Book (1977)
- The Jetsons #11 (1964)
- Korak, Son of Taran #16 (1967)
- Lassie #63 (1963)
- The Lion #1 (1963)
- The Lone Ranger #13 (1969)
- The Lucy Show #4 (1964)
- Magnus, Robot Fighter #2, 41 (1963–1975)
- The Man from U.N.C.L.E. #11 (1967)
- March of Comics #254, 266, 278 (1963–1965)
- Microbots #1 (1971)
- Mighty Samson #8–20 (1966–1969)
- Mod Wheels #1, 16 (1971–1975)
- Mystery Comics Digest #1, 7–8, 16, 19, 21–22, 25 (1972–1975)
- Nancy and Sluggo #192 (1963)
- National Velvet #1 (1962)
- The Nurses #1 (1963)
- The Phantom #3, 7, 9 (1963–1964)
- Questar #1 (1979)
- Rawhide #2 (1963)
- Rin Tin Tin and Rusty #1 (1963)
- Rio Conchos #1 (1965)
- Ripley's Believe It or Not! #7, 15, 19, 21, 23, 26–34, 36–37, 39–40, 43–44, 48, 52, 56, 58, 65–69, 72–73, 77–78, 87–88, 93–94 (1967–1980)
- Ripley's Believe It or Not True Ghost Stories #2 (1979)
- Shroud of Mystery #1 (1982)
- Starstream #1–2 (1976)
- Supercar #3 (1963)
- The Three Stooges #17 (1964)
- Tiger Girl #1 (1968)
- Top Cat #7 (1963)
- Turok, Son of Stone #117, 120, 122, 124, 126–127, 129–130 (1978–1982)
- The Twilight Zone #3, 6–7, 9, 27, 35–37, 39–43, 45, 47, 51–52, 54, 59–64, 68–69, 71–73, 76, 78–79, 82–84, 87, 89, 91 (1963–1979)
- UFO Flying Saucers #2, 6–13 (1970–1977)
- The Virginian #1 (1963)
- Walt Disney Presents Blackbeard's Ghost #1 (1968)
- Walt Disney The Horse Without a Head #1 (1964)
- Walt Disney's Son of Flubber #1 (1963)
- Walt Disney's Summer Magic #1 (1963)
- Walt Disney's The Beagle Boys #10 (1970)
- Walt Disney's The Moon-Spinners #1 (1964)
- Walt Disney's World of Adventure #2 (1963)
- The Wild Wild West #6 (1969)

=== Marvel Comics ===
- Ghost Rider #59, 62, 64–65 (1981–1982)
- Marvel Comics Presents #34 (Captain America); #50 (Silver Surfer) (1989–1990)
- Marvel Fanfare #15 (Daredevil) (1984)
- Tales of Suspense #87 (Captain America) (1967)
- X-Men #30 (1967)
