= Claire Voyant (comic strip) =

American comic strip by Jack Sparling

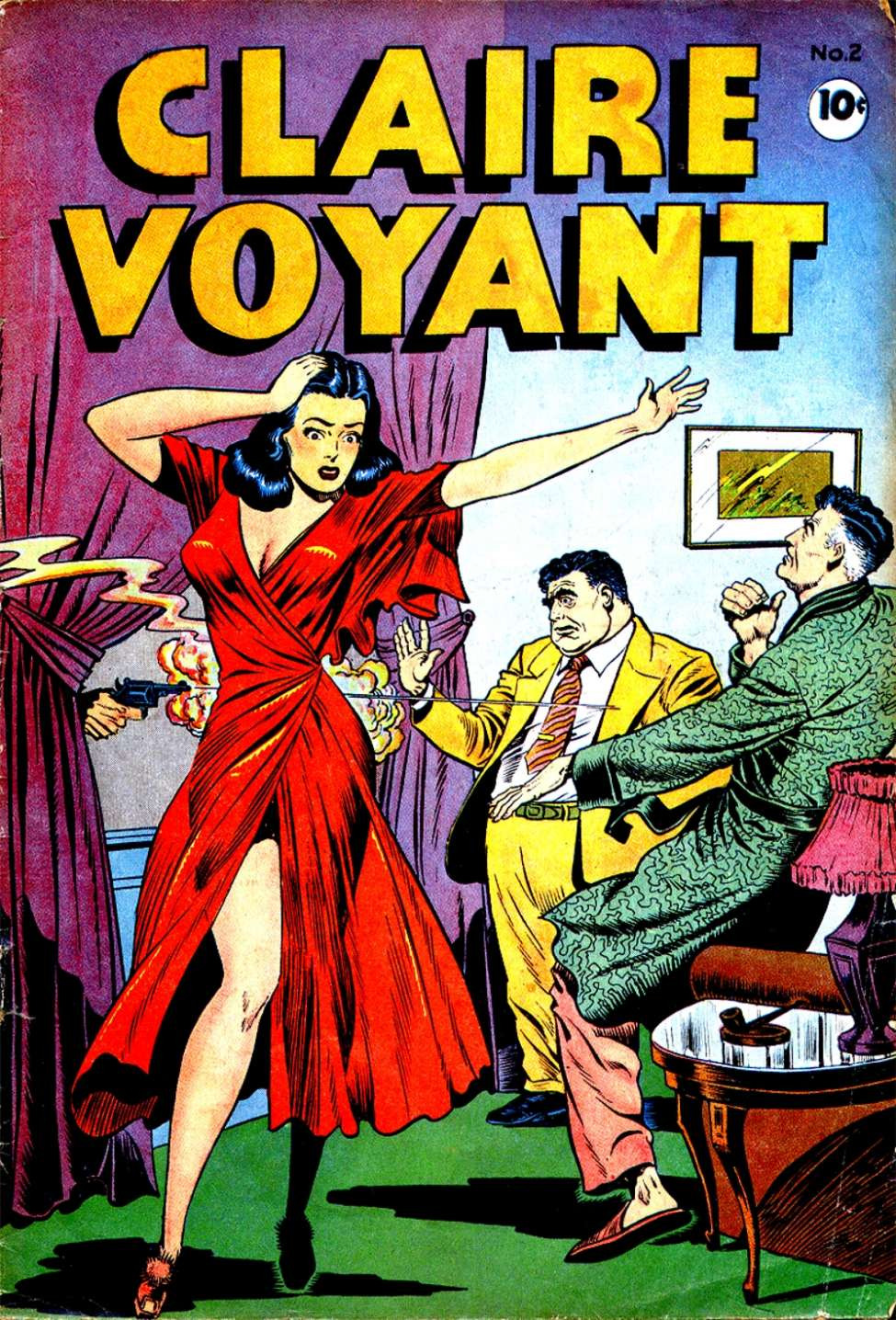
- Claire on the cover of Claire Voyant #2, a collection of the strips.
- Author(s): Jack Sparling
- Current status/schedule: Canceled
- Launch date: May 10, 1943
- End date: November 23, 1948
- Syndicate(s): Chicago Sun-Times Syndicate

Claire Voyant is an American syndicated comic strip created by cartoonist Jack Sparling. The strip premiered on May 10, 1943, in the New York newspaper PM, and continued until November 23, 1948. Her name is a pun on clairvoyance.

== Characters and story ==
The title character was discovered unconscious and adrift in a lifeboat. With no memory of her name or past, she called herself Claire Voyant. After several years, Claire was revealed to be Lyn Hall, a chorus girl. Lynn had been touring with the USO when the ship she was on was torpedoed by a U-boat.

The strip was carried by the Chicago Sun-Times Syndicate and appeared in many national dailies. Some of the strips were later reprinted in comic book format by Standard Comics with covers by Jack Kamen. After the strip was dropped by the Sun-Times syndicate, there were no further appearances.
