= Jesse Marsh =

American comics artist and animator

- Born: July 27, 1907 Florence, Alabama
- Died: April 28, 1966 (aged 58) Monrovia, California
- Areas: Cartoonist, Penciller, Inker
- Notable works: Tarzan, Gene Autry

Jesse Marsh (July 27, 1907 – April 28, 1966) was an American comics artist and animator. He is best known for his work on the early Tarzan and related comic books for Western Publishing that saw print through Dell Comics and later Gold Key Comics. He was the first artist to produce original Tarzan comic books. Previously, all Tarzan comics were reprints from the newspaper strips. He also worked on the Gene Autry comic book for many years.

Marsh's deceptively simple style of cartooning has been praised by critics. Writer Dan Nadel noted his "scalloped brush strokes for clouds, the tangle lines for the brush, and the swift, coarse outline of Tarzan's body in motion" in his introduction to a collection of his Tarzan stories. Artist Gary Panter called Marsh's art "a stripped-down version of Milt Caniff's or Noel Sickles's movie-influenced drawings. Marsh's style was virtuosic in the use of blocks of black areas and empty spaces, in compositions derived from Orientalism and the influences of Japanese ukiyoe prints on late nineteeth-century painters and illustrators, like Whistler, Toulouse-Lautrec, and Aubrey Beardsley, a generation before the first Sunday comics pages."

Prior to working for Western, he had worked for The Walt Disney Company, doing animation work for Make Mine Music and some Pluto cartoons as well.

Marsh began drawing the adventures of Tarzan in 1947 with Dell Comics' Four Color #134, with the story "Tarzan and the Devil Ogre," written by Gaylord DuBois. Marsh also provided book covers, promotional art, and other images for Tarzan and other jungle-themed products throughout his years on the feature. He would turn the Tarzan series over to Russ Manning in 1965 due to failing health.

Marsh was also the original illustrator of the Brothers of the Spear feature, which ran initially from 1952 to 1966.

In 2009, Dark Horse Comics announced an archive reprint series of his work on Tarzan entitled Tarzan: The Jesse Marsh Years.

== Collected editions ==
- Tarzan: The Jesse Marsh Years
  - Volume 1 collects Four Color #134 and 161 and Tarzan #1–4, 256 pages, January 2009, ISBN 1-59582-238-0
  - Volume 2 collects Tarzan #5–10, 224 pages, May 2009, ISBN 1-59582-294-1
  - Volume 3 collects Tarzan #11–16, 240 pages, September 2009, ISBN 1-59582-379-4
  - Volume 4 collects Tarzan #17–21, 232 pages, November 2009, ISBN 1-59582-392-1
  - Volume 5 collects Tarzan #22–27, 240 pages, February 2010, ISBN 1-59582-426-X
  - Volume 6 collects Tarzan #28–32 and Tarzan's Jungle Annual #1, 248 pages, August 2010, ISBN 1-59582-497-9
  - Volume 7 collects Tarzan #33–38, 224 pages, November 2010, ISBN 1-59582-547-9
  - Volume 8 collects Tarzan #39–43, 224 pages, February 2011, ISBN 1-59582-548-7
  - Volume 9 collects Tarzan #44–46 and Tarzan's Jungle Annual #2, 240 pages, May 2011, ISBN 1-59582-649-1
  - Volume 10 collects Tarzan #47–51, 224 pages, December 2011, ISBN 1595827536
  - Volume 11 collects Tarzan #52–56 and March of Comics #125, 224 pages, July 2012, ISBN 1595827544
- Edgar Rice Burroughs' John Carter of Mars: The Jesse Marsh Years collects Four Color Comics #375, #437, #488, 120 pages, May 2010, Dark Horse Comics ISBN 1595824715.
- Brothers of the Spear Archives #1 collects Marsh's Brothers of the Spear stories from Tarzan #25-39, 280 pages, December 2011, Dark Horse Comics ISBN 9781595828217
