= Digest size =

Magazine size

Digest size is a magazine size, smaller than a conventional or "journal size" magazine, but larger than a standard paperback book, approximately 14 cm × 21 cm (5 1/2 by 8 1/4 inches). It is also a 13.65 cm × 21.27 cm (5 3/8 by 8 3/8 inches) and 14 cm × 19 cm (5 1/2 by 7 1/2 inches) format, similar to the size of a DVD case. These sizes evolved from the printing press operation end. Some printing presses refer to digest size as a "catalog size". The digest format was a convenient size for readers to tote around or to leave within easy hand-reach.

== Examples ==
The most famous digest-sized magazine is Reader's Digest, from which the size appears to have been named. TV Guide also used the format from its inception in 1953 until 2005. Bird Watcher's Digest was an international magazine that has retained the digest size from its creation in 1978 until it folded in 2021.

Digest size is less popular now than it once was. The Penny Publications crime fiction and science fiction magazines Ellery Queen's Mystery Magazine, Alfred Hitchcock's Mystery Magazine, Analog and Asimov's Science Fiction, as well as many of their word-puzzle and now-folded horoscope magazines, switched to a format slightly taller than standard digest size. Other publications remaining in digest size are Prevention, Guideposts Magazine and some Archie comics digests.

Children's Digest was originally in digest size but switched long ago to a larger format as well, though keeping the word "Digest" in its name. Writer's Digest is another publication with the word in its name that is not actually produced at that size.

== Science fiction digests ==
From the 1950s the format was used by several science fiction magazines. Those still being published as of 2023 are:

- Analog (originally called Astounding from 1930 to 1960, digest size 1943–1963; 1965–present)
- Isaac Asimov's Science Fiction Magazine (1977–present)
- The Magazine of Fantasy & Science Fiction (1949–present)

Magazines that were published in digest format but are no longer being published include:

- Galaxy Science Fiction (1950–1980)
- New Worlds (digest from 1949–1964)
- Other Worlds (digest from 1949–1955)
- Science Fantasy (digest from 1950–1964)
- Worlds of If (1952–1974)

== Comics digests ==
From the late 1960s on, several comic book publishers put out "comics digests," consisting mostly if not entirely of reprinted material, usually about 6 1/2 in × 5 in (17 by 13 centimetres). Gold Key Comics produced three digest titles that lasted until the mid-1970s: Golden Comics Digest, Mystery Comics Digest, and Walt Disney Comics Digest. DC Comics produced several in the early 1980s (including DC Special Blue Ribbon Digest and The Best of DC), and Harvey Comics also published a few during the same time (including Richie Rich Digest Magazine). Archie Comics has published numerous comics digests since 1973, and in the 2000s Marvel Comics has produced a number of digests, primarily for reprint editions.

The manga graphic novel format is similar to digest size, although slightly narrower and generally thicker.

The standard A5 paper size, used by many UK fanzines, is slightly wider and taller than digest size.

In Italy, Topolino's Disney comics title has been published in the format since 1949, inspired by Reader's Digest (which was also published by Arnoldo Mondadori Editore). Also Diabolik and the vast number of fumetti neri ("black comics") for adults are commonly published in this format.

The format is widely used in comics published in several countries, including Italy, France, Brazil, Mexico, and Spain.
