= Mighty Samson =

- Cover of Mighty Samson #32 by Whitman Comics

Publication information
- Publisher: Western Publishing
- Format: Ongoing series
- Publication date: July 1964 - April 1982
- No. of issues: 32

Creative team
- Written by: Otto Binder
- Artist(s): Frank Thorne, Jack Sparling

Collected editions
- Mighty Samson Archives Vol. 1: ISBN 1595825797
- Mighty Samson Archives Vol. 2: ISBN 1595826599
- Mighty Samson Archives Vol. 3: ISBN 1595827056
- Mighty Samson Archives Vol. 4: ISBN 1595827935

Mighty Samson was a comic book series published Gold Key Comics. A post-apocalyptic adventure, it was set in the area around New York City, now known as "N'Yark", on an Earth devastated by a nuclear war. The series was created by writer Otto Binder and artist Frank Thorne.

== Publication history ==
Mighty Samson ran for 32 issues between 1964 and 1982. Its initial run lasted 20 issues (cover-dated July 1964 - 1969). Issues #7–20 each had a back-up story with the large-headed character Tom Morrow. Mighty Samson returned in 1972 with issue #21 and ran through #31 in 1976. The first two issues of the revival reprinted #7 and #2, respectively.

A final new story was published in Gold Key Champion #2 in 1978. Then in 1982, six years after its immediate predecessor, Whitman Comics published issue #32, which reprinted #3 but with a line-art version of #4's painted cover. It was sold bagged with Turok #130 and Dagar the Invincible #18.

Issues #1 through #6 featured art by Frank Thorne, most well known for illustrating Marvel Comics' adaptation of Robert E. Howard's Red Sonja in the 1970s. Artist Jack Sparling took over the artwork with #8, and Binder and Sparling did the title through #20. In the new issues beginning with #23, art was by José Delbo, and later by Jack Abel. Most covers were fully painted by Morris Gollub. Others were generally by George Wilson.

Western Printing and Lithographing, which owns Gold Key, left the comic book business in 1984. A few years later, some of its properties, such as Doctor Solar and Turok, Son of Stone, were picked up by Valiant Comics, though Mighty Samson was not.

In 2010, Dark Horse Comics began publishing the first of four hardcover archives, each reprinting several issues of the original series in one place for the first time.

In December 2010, Dark Horse Comics also began a new re-imagining the Mighty Samson series. Among the new creative team members were former Marvel Editor-in-Chief Jim Shooter serving as head writer, and artist include Patrick Olliffe. The first issue included a bonus reprint of the 1964 issue #1.

In 2016, Dynamite Entertainment launched Gold Key: Alliance, a story with Gold Key properties, including Samson.

== Fictional character biography ==
Samson is a heroic barbarian adventurer endowed with superhuman size and strength living in a future where nuclear war has bombed the world back into a second Stone Age. Leaving his home tribe after the death of his mother, he loses an eye to a ferocious hybrid creature called a liobear (a mixture of a lion and a bear), which the blond giant manages to kill in unarmed combat, later skinning and wearing its red pelt caveman-style throughout most of his adventures and using a strip of its hide as an eyepatch.

Badly wounded in the battle, he is found and nursed back to health by the beautiful golden-haired Sharmaine, whose father Mindor is a bespectacled, white-coated scientist who extrapolates forgotten 20th-century knowledge from ancient artifacts he discovers in the ruins of N'Yark (New York). In gratitude, Samson decides to join in their quest to restore the benefits of civilization to mankind and protect them from the bizarre mutant beasts and savage tribes that dwell among the once famous landmarks of the rubble-strewn, jungle-choked city.

He must also defend them from a recurring foe in the lovely, dark-haired form of the ruthlessly ambitious Queen Terra of Jerz (New Jersey), a highly competent scientist in her own right who attempts to use the advanced technology she uncovers to expand her kingdom into the devastated metropolis and to win the mighty Samson for her own.
