= Brothers of the Spear =

Comic book feature

"Brothers of the Spear" was a long-running backup feature in the Tarzan comic-book series created by American company Western Publishing and published first through Dell Comics and then through Gold Key Comics. Though published as part of a licensed Edgar Rice Burroughs franchise, this original series was owned by Western.

== Plot ==
The Brothers of the Spear were Dan-El and Natongo. Natongo was the son of a Zulu chieftain in the land that would become Botswana, and Dan-El was his adopted brother. They became sub-chiefs, swore brotherhood and had adventures together. They learned Dan-el was king by right, whose throne had been usurped. What was notable was that Dan-El was white, and his kingdom was that of a lost white tribe in Africa (Aba-Zulu), while Natongo was black (later ruling neighboring Tungelu). The first two years of the series dealt with them winning their thrones. By that time, they had individually gotten married. But even being kings and husbands, they continued to have adventures together, many times with their wives.

== History ==
The feature was created by writer Gaylord Du Bois and artist Jesse Marsh in Tarzan #25 (1951), and ran continuously through #156 (1966). Artist Russ Manning did some of his earliest comics work on this series, beginning in Tarzan #39 (Dec. 1952).

The ending of the series generally coincided with Russ Manning's being assigned to illustrate Tarzan (Jesse Marsh, had been going blind from diabetes; he retired from the assignment) beginning #154. Before he died, Marsh did illustrate Jon of the Kalahari, a Korak back-up feature created and written by Gaylord Du Bois. That strip was killed upon his death.

Three issues after Tarzan #154, even with Mike Royer sharing the labor doing inks, the Brothers of the Spear strip was suspended. Manning continued as the Tarzan illustrator for the series. A new back-up feature, created and written by Du Bois, "Jungle Girl", illustrated by Dan Spiegel, replaced Brothers of the Spear.

New Brothers of the Spear stories appeared in Tarzan #158, 160, and 161 (illustrated by Manning), and later in #202 and 203 (illustrated by Mike Royer).

An additional story, "Treachery in Aba-Zulu" (illustrated by Manning), had appeared in Dell Giant #51 (Tarzan, King of the Jungle) in 1961.

DC Comics licensed the rights to Tarzan in 1972. The rights to Brothers of the Spear were retained by Western Publishing.

Western's Gold Key line published the 17-issue Brothers of the Spear series (June 1972 – Feb. 1976). Western's Whitman line published issue #18 in May 1982, with reprinted material only. Du Bois wrote the series beginning with issue #2. Jesse Santos did the artwork for the first 12 issues, followed by Dan Spiegle.

In 2012, Dark Horse Comics started a hardcover archive series. The first volume reprints strips from Tarzan #25–67. The second volume reprints strips from Tarzan #68–109. The third volume reprints strips from "Tarzan" #110-156, #160-161 and #202-203.

The Manning-illustrated Brothers of the Spear story "Tembo! Tembo!" in Tarzan #158 was reprinted in Golden Comics Digest #9 (March 1970).

The 12 page story, "Treachery in Aba-Zulu", in Dell Giant #51, has been reprinted three times (per Grand Comics Database online), but not in the United States.
