= Bob Fujitani =

American comic book artist (1921–2020)

- Born: October 15, 1921; Kripplebush, New York, U.S.
- Died: September 6, 2020 (aged 98); Cos Cob, Connecticut, U.S.
- Occupation: Comic book artist

Robert Fujitani (October 15, 1921 – September 6, 2020) was an American comic book artist.

== Biography ==
Fujitani was born in 1921 to an Irish-Japanese family in Kripplebush, a small hamlet in Marbletown, New York.

After studying art in New York City, he drew comics for several small publishers within the city at the beginning of the 1940s. Some of his publishers include Avon, Dell Comics, Harvey Comics, Lev Gleason Publications, and others. He also illustrated magazine articles and was a ghostwriter on several comic series, including Flash Gordon. In the 1960s, he helped create the comic strip Doctor Solar, Man of the Atom. In the 1990s, he illustrated Rip Kirby. In 2005, he received an Inkpot Award at San Diego Comic-Con.

Fujitani died on September 6, 2020, at the age of 98. He had suffered a stroke in June of that year.
