= Chase Craig =

American writer/cartoonist (1910–2001)

- Craig in 1969
- Born: Wingate Chase Craig; August 28, 1910 Ennis, Texas, U.S.
- Died: December 2, 2001 (aged 91) Thousand Oaks, California, U.S.
- Areas: Cartoonist, Writer, Editor
- Awards: Inkpot Award (1982)
- Spouse: Mary Jane Green (m. 1943)

Wingate Chase Craig (August 28, 1910 – December 2, 2001) was an American writer-cartoonist who worked principally on comic strips and comic books. From the mid-1940s to mid-1970s he was a prolific editor and scripter for Western Publishing's Dell and Gold Key Comics, including the popular Disney comics line.

== Career ==
Born in Ennis, Texas, in 1933–34 Craig studied at the Chicago Academy of Fine Arts and then moved to Boston. There he worked at The Christian Science Monitor, drawing Little Chauncey, which featured the antics of a rather precocious baby. Craig moved to Hollywood in 1935, where he became an animator for Leon Schlesinger Productions and Walter Lantz Productions. Craig left the animation field in 1939 and began working as a freelancer. He drew several comic strips, including Hollywood Hams (for the Los Angeles Daily News) and Mortimer Snerd and Charlie McCarthy. He teamed up with Fred Fox, and drew the Odd Bodkins comic strip for Esquire Features (1941–42) as well as writing and drawing for the first six weeks in 1942 the Bugs Bunny comic Sunday pages and the first Bugs Bunny comic book.

In the early 1940s he joined, Dell Publishing where he was one of the first artists to draw comic stories featuring Bugs Bunny, Porky Pig, and Elmer Fudd. With the onslaught of World War II, Craig signed on with the United States Navy in 1942 and worked as a training manual illustrator at Hollywood's famed Vine Street Pier. He married Mary Jane Green in 1943.

Comics historian Mark Evanier summarized several aspects of Craig's career: Chase was born in Texas and moved to Los Angeles in the 1930s to get into the animation business. His fellow Texan, Tex Avery, gave him a job in the story unit at Warner Bros. Cartoons, where he worked for some time without—for some reason—ever getting a screen credit. After a few years, he decided to turn his attention to print cartooning and left . . . only to be quickly tapped by Western Printing and Lithography to write and draw stories for its first Bugs Bunny comics. Chase produced over half of the first issue of Looney Tunes and Merrie Melodies comics, issued under the Dell label, including the authorship of the Mary Jane & Sniffles strip. (Sniffles the Mouse had been a character in the cartoons, but Chase came up with the format for this long-running strip, naming the character of Mary Jane after his then-recent bride.) Western soon hired him as an editor and, through the mid-1970s, he worked out of their Los Angeles office, editing (at one point) a comic per day, at a time when it was not uncommon for one of their comics to sell over a million copies. He was the editor who kept Carl Barks producing Donald Duck and Uncle Scrooge stories, and Paul Murry doing Mickey Mouse and so many others.

Craig became the West Coast editor for the Western Publishing (Dell/Gold Key) comics in 1950. Throughout the 1950s and into the 1970s Craig served as editor of Dell/Western Publishing's Disney titles, including Walt Disney's Comics and Stories, Uncle Scrooge, Chip 'n' Dale and other titles. Craig recognized the genius of Carl Barks whose Scrooge McDuck, Junior Woodchucks, and other Disney duck characters have delighted generations of fans. Craig served as Bark's last and longest-serving editor. For Dell's Disney titles, Craig created and scripted such characters as the Li'l Bad Wolf, Br'er Rabbit, Little Bear Bongo and José Carioca.

In 1962 Western Publishing began in-house publishing and launched Gold Key Comics. The Los Angeles–based office produced comics licensed by arrangement with the Walt Disney Company, Warner Bros., Metro-Goldwyn-Mayer, Edgar Rice Burroughs, and Walter Lantz Productions, and many of its magazine titles were produced under Craig's editorial hand. Craig had a special affection for DePatie–Freleng Enterprises' Pink Panther and Edgar Rice Burroughs' characters, most notably Tarzan and Korak, son of Tarzan. Craig also handled comic book adaptations of popular television shows like Gunsmoke as well as numerous feature films that were adapted into comic book versions.

Craig created a number of Gold Key's original characters, perhaps the most notable being, in February 1962, Magnus, Robot Fighter, 4000 A.D. He envisioned Magnus as "a sort of future Tarzan" and enlisted the artistic and story writing talents of Russ Manning for the new series which premiered in February 1963. Craig also created a number of other cartoon characters for Gold Key comics, including, in 1964, The Little Monsters, which ran more or less continuously until February 1978. Craig retired from Western Printing and Lithography in the summer of 1975, but shortly thereafter was hired by Hanna-Barbera to create and supervise the production of a Scooby-Doo comic strip and comic books; he also briefly was a writer for several of Marvel Comics' other Hanna-Barbera titles.

Once fully retired, Craig moved to Westlake Village, California, where he served as president of the Northshore Property Owners Association. In 1982, Craig received the Inkpot Award for outstanding achievements in comic art from San Diego Comic-Con. He died December 2, 2001, at Los Robles Hospital & Medical Center (in Thousand Oaks, California), following complications after a surgery necessitated by a fall.

== Legacy ==
Over thirteen linear feet of Craig's artwork, comic books he edited, and work-related correspondence (including letters from Carl Barks and others) were donated by Craig and family members to create The Chase Craig Collection. It is housed at California State University, Northridge's University Library, Special Collections & Archives.
