= Doctor Spektor =

- Dr. Spektor, on the cover of issue #15, art by Jesse Santos.

Publication information
- Publisher: Western Publishing
- First appearance: Mystery Comics Digest #5 (July 1972)
- Created by: Donald F. Glut (script); Dan Spiegle (art)

In-story information
- Full name: Doctor Adam Spektor
- Partnerships: Lakota Rainflower, Lu-Sai
- Abilities: Skilled investigator
The Occult Files of Doctor Spektor
Publication information
- Publisher: Gold Key Comics
- Schedule: Bimonthly
- Format: Ongoing series
- Genre: Horror
- Publication date: May 1973 – Feb. 1977
- No. of issues: 24
- Main character(s): Dr. Spektor
Creative team
- Written by: Donald F. Glut
- Artist(s): Dan Spiegle, Jesse Santos
Collected editions
- The Occult Files of Doctor Spektor Archives, Vol. 1: ISBN 1-59582-600-9
- The Occult Files of Doctor Spektor Archives. Vol. 2: ISBN 1-59582-667-X
- The Occult Files of Doctor Spektor Archives, Vol. 3: ISBN 1-59582-819-2
- The Occult Files of Doctor Spektor Archives, Vol. 4: ISBN 1-59582-852-4

Doctor Spektor is a fictional comic book "occult detective" that appeared in Western Publishing's Gold Key Comics. Created by writer Donald F. Glut and artist Dan Spiegle, he first appeared in Mystery Comics Digest #5 (July 1972).

== Publication history ==
After his first appearance in a 10-page story in Mystery Comics Digest #5, Dr. Spektor was spun off into his own title, The Occult Files of Doctor Spektor. The series ran for 24 issues (May 1973 - February 1977). His final original story appeared in one issue of Gold Key Spotlight (#8, August 1977). Jesse Santos replaced Spiegle as artist on the series, and remained there for the entire run.

Dr. Spektor appeared in all four issues of Gold Key's Spine-Tingling Tales (1975–76), where he provided linking narration for some of the stories within (these stories were reprints from Mystery Comics Digest that dealt with characters who later appeared in his title). He also had stories he narrated in Mystery Comics Digest #10, #11, #12, and #21, and articles in Golden Comics Digest #25, #26, and #33.

Under the Whitman Comics name, issue #25 was released in May 1982. It reprinted issue #1, but with a line-art cover instead of the original painted cover.

In 2014, Dynamite Entertainment released a new version of Doctor Spektor, written by Mark Waid and drawn by Neil Edwards, as part of the company's revival of several Gold Key characters which also included Magnus, Robot Fighter, Dr. Solar and Turok.

== Fictional character biography ==
Doctor Adam Spektor is an occult investigator, dealing with various occult menaces, such as mummies (Ra-Ka-Tep), vampires (Baron Tibor, Dracula), werewolves, and more. He is aided by Lakota Rainflower, his Sioux secretary (until issue #22), along with several semi-recurring assistants (Elliot Kane in issue #4 and #10, future love interest Lu-Sai in issues #12 and #24, his cousin Anne Sara in issue #17). Several of the monsters he encounters return in subsequent issues, and for three issues, Spektor became a werewolf (#11-13).

Issues #2–11 contain short stories in the back 'from the occult files of Doctor Spektor' and narrated by Spektor, which many times include creatures and characters from the main series such as Durak (or at least his knife), Elliot Kane, and others.

Don Glut had Dr. Spektor crossover with several of his other Gold Key characters such as Tragg and Dagar. Tragg and Lorn make cameo appearances in issue #19. Ostellon, Master of the Living Bones (from Dagar the Invincible #1), appears in issue #7; issue #15 concludes a story begun in Dagar #13, and Durak from Dagar appears in #16. Doctor Solar appears in several issues (#14, #18, #23), and Gold Key's the Owl appears in #22. Spektor also made a brief one-page appearance administering "Dr. Spektor's Creature Quiz" in Glut's children's book Monsters: Fiendish Facts, Quivery Quizzes and Other Grisly Goings-on, also from Golden Press.

== Powers and abilities ==
Dr. Spektor is a skilled investigator of the occult, and very knowledgeable about the lore of the paranormal. During issues #11-13 Dr. Spektor became a werewolf. During that time he possessed, while in werewolf form, increased strength, stamina, and invulnerability (except to silver weapons).
