= Donald F. Glut =

Writer, director, musician, actor (born 1944)

- Born: February 19, 1944 (age 82); Pecos, Texas, U.S.
- Occupations: Film director; screenwriter; writer; musician
- Years active: 1953–present
- Notable work: The Empire Strikes Back novelization Dagar the Invincible; The Occult Files of Dr. Spektor; Tragg and the Sky Gods; The Penny Arkade
- Awards: Inkpot Award (1980); Bill Finger Award for Excellence in Comic Book Writing (2025)

Donald Frank Glut (/ɡluːt/; born February 19, 1944) is an American writer, motion picture film director, and screenwriter. He is best known for writing the novelization of the second Star Wars film, The Empire Strikes Back (1980).

== Filmmaker ==
=== Amateur career ===
From 1953 to 1969, Glut made a total of 41 amateur films, on subjects ranging from dinosaurs, to unauthorized adaptations of such characters as Superman, The Spirit, and Spider-Man.

Due to publicity he received in the pages of Forrest J Ackerman's magazine Famous Monsters of Filmland, Glut was able to achieve a degree of notoriety based on his work. This allowed him to increase the visibility of his films by obtaining the services of known actors such as Kenne Duncan and Glenn Strange, who reprised his most famous role as the Frankenstein Monster for Glut.

His final amateur film was 1969's Spider-Man, after which he moved into professional work full-time.

On October 3, 2006, Epoch Cinema released a two-DVD set of all 41 of Glut's amateur films titled I Was A Teenage Moviemaker. The total running time of both DVDs is 480 minutes, and includes a documentary about the making of those films, with interviews with Forrest J Ackerman, Randal Kleiser, Bob Burns, Jim Harmon, Scott Shaw, Paul Davids, Bill Warren, and others.

=== Professional career ===
Over the next decades, Glut pursued a variety of professions in the entertainment field. He worked heavily as a screenwriter, mostly in children's television on shows such as Shazam!, Land of the Lost, Spider-Man, Transformers, Challenge of the GoBots, Spider-Man and His Amazing Friends, DuckTales, Tarzan, Lord of the Jungle, The Super Powers Team: Galactic Guardians, G.I. Joe: A Real American Hero, X-Men, and many more.

He also claimed to have created some of the characters and much of the back story for the Masters of the Universe toy line, which served as the basis for the TV show.

With the release of 1996's Dinosaur Valley Girls, Glut began a professional directing career that has seen him helm several exploitation-style films, such as The Erotic Rites of Countess Dracula (2001), The Mummy's Kiss (2003), Countess Dracula's Orgy of Blood (2004), The Mummy's Kiss: 2nd Dynasty (2006), and Blood Scarab (2007). He wrote and directed Dances with Werewolves (2017) and Tales of Frankenstein (2018).

== Writer ==
Having been a classmate and friend of Glut at the University of Southern California, George Lucas approached him to write the novelization of A New Hope, but Glut turned him down due to the low pay and the fact the Lucas' name would be on the cover. Glut then wrote the novelization of The Empire Strikes Back (1980). While working on the novel, he had difficulty because details of the script and the art design were compartmentalized inside Lucasfilm. Descriptions of some characters and scenes in the novel turned out differently from the film as Glut had to base them on concept art by Ralph McQuarrie.

Glut has written approximately 65 published books, both novels, and nonfiction, plus numerous children's books based on franchises. Many of his nonfiction books have been about dinosaurs, including Dinosaur Dictionary and the Dinosaurs: The Encyclopedia series of reference works.

Glut created and wrote several series for Western Publishing's line of Gold Key Comics including The Occult Files of Dr. Spektor, Dagar the Invincible, and Tragg and the Sky Gods. At Marvel Comics, he wrote Captain America, The Invaders, Kull the Destroyer, Solomon Kane, Star Wars, and What If...?. His work for Warren Publishing included Creepy, Eerie, and Vampirella. More recently, Glut has been working for Warrant Publishing Company, a company that is publishing magazines as an homage to Warren Publishing's past work using similar layouts and artwork. Glut is working as an associate editor and writer on some of Warrant's homage titles such as The Creeps and Vampiress Carmilla.

== Musician ==
In 1967–1968, Glut played bass for The Penny Arkade. They recorded only one album, produced by Michael Nesmith of the Monkees. The album was not released until 2004 as a limited Record Store Day LP/CD by Sundazed Music.

== Awards ==
Glut received the Inkpot Award in 1980 and the Bill Finger Award for Excellence in Comic Book Writing in 2025.

== Selected bibliography ==
=== Books ===
- The Dinosaur Dictionary (1972)
- The Frankenstein Legend: A Tribute to Mary Shelley and Boris Karloff (1973)
- The Dracula Book (1975)
- Spawn (#43) (1976)
- The Great Television Heroes (1975)
- The Dinosaur Scrapbook (1980)
- The Empire Strikes Back (1980) (novelization)
- The New Dinosaur Dictionary (1982)
- Classic Movie Monsters (1991)
- The Complete Dinosaur Dictionary (1992)
- Dinosaurs: The Encyclopedia (1997)
- Chomper (Dinotopia No. 11) (2000)
- Jurassic Classics: A Collection of Saurian Essays and Mesozoic Musings (2000)
- The Frankenstein Archive: Essays on the Monster, the Myth, the Movies, and More (2002)
- True Vampires of History (1971)
- True Werewolves of History (2004)
- Shock Theatre, Chicago Style: WBKB-TV's Late Night Horror Showcase, 1957-1959 (2012)

== Comics bibliography ==
=== Archie Comics ===
- Chilling Adventures in Sorcery #4 (1973)
- Mad House #95 (1974)
- Red Circle Sorcery #8, 11 (1974–1975)

=== Charlton Comics ===
- Ghost Manor #29 (1976)
- Ghostly Haunts #50 (1976)
- Ghostly Tales #125, 163 (1977–1983)

=== DC Comics ===
- House of Mystery #227, 259, 290 (1974–1981)
- House of Secrets #121 (1974)

=== Gold Key Comics/Western Publishing ===
- Dr. Spektor Presents Spine-Tingling Tales #1–4 (1975–1976)
- Gold Key Spotlight #6, 8–9 (1977)
- Grimm's Ghost Stories #24, 35, 38 (1975–1977)
- The Little Monsters #27, 36, 38, 43–44 (1974–1978)
- Mystery Comics Digest #1–21, 23–26 (1972–1975)
- The Occult Files of Dr. Spektor #1–25 (1973–1982)
- Tales of Sword and Sorcery: Dagar the Invincible #1–19 (1972–1982)
- Tragg and the Sky Gods #1–9 (1975–1982)

=== Marvel Comics ===
- Arrgh #3 (1975)
- Captain America #217–220 (1978)
- Ghost Rider (vol. 2) #22 (1977)
- Invaders #29–31, 34, 37–41 (1978–1979)
- Kull the Destroyer #21–29 (1977–1978)
- Marvel Premiere #36–37 (3-D Man) (1977)
- Marvel Preview #19 (1979)
- Savage Sword of Conan #19, 22, 25–26, 33–34, 37, 39, 46, 49, 53–54 (Solomon Kane backup stories) (1977–1980)
- Star Wars #10 (1978)
- Thor #279 (1979)
- Unknown Worlds of Science Fiction #5–6, Annual #1 (1975–1976)
- Vampire Tales #5 (text article) (1974)
- What If...? #5, 7–10, 12, 14, 22 (1977–1980)
- X-Men Adventures #4 (1993)

=== Now Comics ===
- The Twilight Zone #1 (1990)

=== Skywald Publications ===
- Psycho #8 (1972)

=== Warren Publishing ===
- Creepy #29–32, 42 (1969–1971)
- Eerie #25, 30, 32, 36, 39–41, 51, 125 (1969–1981)
- Vampirella #1–5, 8–9, 16, 18–19, 23, 37, 90, Annual #1 (1969–1980)

== Television credits ==
- Shazam! (1974)
- Land of the Lost (1975)
- Space Sentinels (1977)
- Captain Caveman and the Teen Angels (1977-1980)
- The New Shmoo (1979)
- Spider-Man (1981-1982)
- Spider-Man and His Amazing Friends (1981-1983)
- The Biskitts (1983)
- Monchhichis (1983)
- Mighty Orbots (1984)
- The Transformers (1984-1986)
- Challenge of the GoBots (1985)
- G.I. Joe: A Real American Hero (1985)
- Foofur (1986)
- The Centurions (1986)
- DuckTales (1987)
- Sky Commanders (1987)
- Dino-Riders (1988)
- RoboCop (1988)
- Transformers: Generation 2 (1993)
- X-Men (1993)
- Bureau of Alien Detectors (1996)

== Discography ==
=== The Penny Arkade ===
- Not the Freeze (Sundazed, 2004)

Preceded by Doug Moench	Kull the Destroyer writer 1977–1978	Succeeded by n/a
Preceded by Roy Thomas	What If...? writer 1977–1978	Succeeded by Roy Thomas
Preceded by Roy Thomas	Captain America writer 1978	Succeeded by Steve Gerber
