= Mystery Comics Digest =

Publication information
- Publisher: Gold Key Comics
- Schedule: Bimonthly
- Format: Ongoing series
- Genre: Horror
- Publication date: March 1972 – October 1975
- No. of issues: 26

Mystery Comics Digest was one of three digest size comics published by Gold Key Comics in the early 1970s. The other two were Golden Comics Digest and Walt Disney Comics Digest.

== History ==
Mystery Comics Digest was published for 26 issues, from 1972 to 1975. All reprinted stories from three of Gold Key's mystery/suspense/fantasy/science fiction anthologies: Ripley's Believe It or Not!, Boris Karloff's Tales of Mystery, and Twilight Zone, in a three-issue rotation. Each issue highlighted the title it was reprinted from on the cover.

Issue focus:

- Believe It or Not! - #1, 4, 7, 10, 13, 16, 19, 22, 25
- Boris Karloff - #2, 5, 8, 11, 14, 17, 20, 23, 26
- Twilight Zone - #3, 6, 9, 12, 15, 18, 21, 24

In addition to reprints, each issue had several original works. Some of these would introduce characters who appeared in Don Glut's titles at Gold Key: Dagar, Doctor Spektor, and Tragg.

Tragg appeared in issues #3 and 9 before getting his own title.

Doctor Spektor appeared in issues #5, 10–12, and 21 before getting his own title.

Duroc/Durak, who would assist Dagar, appeared in issues #7, 14, 15. Dagar's foe, Xorkon, appeared first in #14. The first two Duroc stories were originally intended to feature Dagar.

Also, several of the creatures that Dr. Spektor fought appeared here first, including Ra-ka-tep the mummy (#1), Count Wulfstein the werewolf (#2), Simbar the werelion (#3), Baron Tibor the vampire (#4), and the Lurker in the Swamp (#7).
