= M.A.R.S. Patrol Total War =

Comic book series

M.A.R.S. Patrol Total War was a short-lived science fiction/war comic book series published by Gold Key Comics for 10 issues from July 1965 to August 1969. The first two issues were titled Total War. The artist on the first 3 issues was Wally Wood, who probably had a hand in creating the series. In 1966 the comic won an Alley Award for Best Normal Group Adventure Title.

== Plot and characters ==
The comic told of an invasion of all nations of the Earth by unknown invaders who used teleportation to appear at different destinations. The invaders were dressed in purple uniforms with a black crab insignia on a yellow circle, and used weapons similar to what was then currently in use with each one having a night vision device on their helmet. The invaders make no demands, but kill anyone (military or civilian) in their path and prefer to kill themselves rather than surrender. Though the invaders were humanoid in appearance they were noticeably hairless with no eyebrows with one issue having a medical examiner saying their internal organs were slightly different. While never clearly stated, the impression is they may be invaders from space. New elements of the invaders background were placed in some stories.

Opposing them is the M.A.R.S. (Marine Attack Rescue Service) Patrol of the United States Marine Corps. The MARS Patrol combat teams are a combination of commandos, paratroops, and guerrillas. The main focus is on one team composed of Lt. Cy Adams, leader and combat pilot; Corporal Russ Stacey, weapons expert and commando; Sgt. Joe Stryker, demolitions expert and paratrooper; and Sgt Ken Hiro, frogman and skilled martial artist. The team is also ethnically diverse, with two European-Americans, Adams and Stacy, Stryker an African-American, and Hiro an Asian-American. The M.A.R.S. team wore green dress uniforms featuring berets and Vandegrift jackets that were tarted up with gold Marine Corps insignia, fourragères, and US Army type coloured scarves. During their combat missions each of the members wore a different colour combat uniform, flight suit or wet suit as required; Adams in yellow, Stryker in orange, Hiro in light green, and Stacey in blue. A typical issue would involve land, sea, and air combat battles in the same story.

One issue of the comic featured a temporarily captured invader who spoke English and related a small bit to his captors about the invader's world that was running out of raw materials and sought them from the Earth and the invader's warrior ethos. Another issue featured an invader female undercover agent (also bald) who may have fallen in love with Russ Stacey.

A wide range of current (and possible near future) military equipment was used. There was the OV-10 Bronco and the F-104 Starfighter aircraft as well as experimental vehicles like the Bell Rocket Belt, Piasecki Flying Jeep, and one-man gyrocopters, as well as more than outlandish but technically feasible inventions such as laser tanks, unmanned aerial vehicle recon drones, and VTOL jets. Surprisingly the infantry weapons seemed a little outdated: Thompson submachine guns, B.A.R.s, water-jacketed M1917 Browning machine guns, and the old M-9 Bazooka. This was later fixed in the series by introducing the "new" M14 and M79 grenade launcher. In some issues an inside back cover illustration featured actual new and experimental weapons of the US Armed Forces.

It's unclear how much involvement Wally Wood had with the creation of the comic. As he followed this title with his spy-fi work on T.H.U.N.D.E.R. Agents, which had many of the same themes (mysterious invader threatening the earth, an acronym team of experts opposing them, etc.), he may have had some involvement with the series.

Dark Horse Comics reprinted the first three issues in a trade paperback collection.
