= Golden Comics Digest =

Series of digest size comics (1969–1976)

Golden Comics Digest was one of three digest size comics published by Gold Key Comics in the early 1970s. The other two were Mystery Comics Digest and Walt Disney Comics Digest.

Published from 1969 to 1976, all 48 issues were reprints, mainly of various licensed properties. These included Tom and Jerry, Bugs Bunny and other Warner Brothers cartoons, Woody Woodpecker and other Walter Lantz Studios characters, The Pink Panther, various Hanna-Barbera properties, Tarzan, The Lone Ranger, and their own Turok and Brothers of the Spear.

== Issue contents ==
1. Tom and Jerry, Woody Woodpecker, Bugs Bunny and friends
2. Hanna-Barbera TV Fun Favorites (Space Ghost, The Flintstones, Yogi Bear, The Jetsons, etc.)
3. Tom and Jerry, Woody Woodpecker
4. Tarzan (plus Brothers of the Spear)
5. Tom and Jerry, Woody Woodpecker, Bugs Bunny
6. Bugs Bunny
7. Hanna-Barbera TV Fun Favorites
8. Tom and Jerry, Woody Woodpecker, Bugs Bunny
9. Tarzan (plus Brothers of the Spear)
10. Bugs Bunny
11. Hanna-Barbera TV Fun Favorites
12. Tom and Jerry, Woody Woodpecker, Bugs Bunny, Journey to the Sun
13. Tom and Jerry
14. Bugs Bunny Fun Packed Funnies
15. Tom and Jerry
16. Woody Woodpecker Cartoon Special
17. Bugs Bunny
18. Tom and Jerry, Barney Bear
19. Little Lulu
20. Woody Woodpecker Falltime Funtime
21. Bugs Bunny Showtime
22. Tom and Jerry Winter Wingding
23. Little Lulu and Tubby Fun Fling
24. Woody Woodpecker Fun Festival
25. Tom and Jerry (Doctor Spektor article)
26. Bugs Bunny Halloween Hulla-Boo-Loo (Doctor Spektor article)
27. Little Lulu and Tubby in Hawaii
28. Tom and Jerry
29. Little Lulu and Tubby
30. Bugs Bunny Vacation Funnies
31. Turok, plus stories from Dell Comics' Indian Chief title
32. Woody Woodpecker Summer Fun
33. Little Lulu and Tubby Halloween Fun (Doctor Spektor appears)
34. Bugs Bunny Winter Funnies
35. Tom and Jerry Snowtime Funtime
36. Little Lulu and her friends
37. Woody Woodpecker Country Fair
38. Pink Panther
39. Bugs Bunny Summer Fun
40. Little Lulu and Tubby Trick or Treat
41. Tom and Jerry Winter Carnival
42. Bugs Bunny
43. Little Lulu in Paris
44. Woody Woodpecker Family Fun Festival
45. Pink Panther
46. Little Lulu and Tubby
47. Bugs Bunny
48. The Lone Ranger
