= Total War: 2006 =

1999 novel by Simon Pearson

- Author: Simon Pearson
- Language: English
- Genre: Future history
- Publication date: 1999
- Publication place: United Kingdom

Total War: 2006 is a 1999 future history novel by Simon Pearson. It describes a speculative future in which small revolutions beginning around 2001 ignite into a worldwide nuclear conflict by 2006.

== Plot ==
The future history the book lays out begins in 2001 with many minor conflicts taking place around the world, such as the end of the Algerian Civil War, victory belonging to the Islamist fundamentalists; Morocco following suit; and a military coup in Turkey to prevent such a development.

Meanwhile, the United Kingdom and the United States invade Iraq as the final action of a failing US president whose nation is attempting to draw ever more into isolationism. North Korea announces that it possesses nuclear weapons; a second Korean War follows closely followed by an attempted Chinese invasion of Taiwan which is easily stopped by American air power.

In 2003, Russia has a military coup which (officially) restores the communists to power, closely followed by an invasion of the Baltic States resulting in a conventional war with NATO. Whilst the attention of the west is drawn here however Saudi Arabia also has a take over by Islamic fundamentalists.

The Islamic Alliance is united behind a Saladin-like figure and forms an alliance of convenience with Russia launching its attack on the West, the principle acts of terrorism being a midget submarine attack on San Francisco harbor and an attack on RAF Brize Norton by home-grown Islamic terrorists.

At the end of the book, much of the Middle East is in ruins, biological weapons launched by the Islamic Alliance against Israel having been met with an implementation of the Samson Option by the Israelis, with nuclear weapons launched at cities across the Islamic crescent by the dying Jewish state. In a desperate bid to prevent Israel from laying waste to much of the world in its death throes, the US President authorizes a nuclear strike on Israel itself.
