= Tragg and the Sky Gods =

Publication information
- Publisher: Gold Key Comics
- First appearance: Mystery Comics Digest #3 (Apr. 1972)
- Created by: Donald F. Glut and Jesse Santos

In-story information
- Species: Cro-Magnon
- Place of origin: Prehistoric Earth
- Partnerships: Lorn
Tragg and the Sky Gods
Publication information
- Publisher: Gold Key Comics
- Schedule: Four times a year
- Format: Ongoing series
- Genre: Science fiction/Fantasy
- Publication date: June 1975 – Feb. 1977
- No. of issues: 8
- Main character: Tragg
Creative team
- Written by: Donald F. Glut
- Artist(s): Jesse Santos, Dan Spiegle

Tragg and the Sky Gods was a comic-book title published by Gold Key Comics in the mid-1970s. The series was created by writer Donald F. Glut and artist Jesse Santos. Later, artist Dan Spiegle would work on the title.

== Appearances ==
The character first appeared in Mystery Comics Digest #3, published in April 1972. His next appearance was in Mystery Comics Digest #9 in January 1973. A series, Tragg and the Sky Gods, would then run from #1 (June 1975) to #8 (February 1977). The last original Tragg story appeared in Gold Key Spotlight #9 in September 1977. Whitman, the successor to Gold Key, later reprinted the first issue as #9 in May 1982.

== Description ==
Tragg and the Sky Gods was a mix of science fiction and prehistoric fiction. The book narrated the tale of a group of advanced aliens who landed on Earth in the distant past and experimented on the Neanderthals they found there, producing two Cro-Magnons, who would become Tragg and his mate, Lorn. Tragg and Lorn would thus be the ancestors of all modern humans. Writer Glut tied Tragg into other series he created at Gold Key, by having Tragg's Neanderthal brother Jarn appear in Dagar the Invincible.
