= Solar (comics) =

- Michael Komarck's cover art for Doctor Solar, Man of the Atom #1 (July 2010) from Dark Horse Comics

Publication information
- Publisher: Gold Key Comics; Valiant Comics; Acclaim Comics; Dark Horse Comics; Dynamite Entertainment
- First appearance: Doctor Solar: Man of the Atom #1 (Oct. 1962)
- Created by: Paul S. Newman (writer, concept co-creator); Matt Murphy (editor, concept co-creator); Bob Fujitani (artist)

In-story information
- Alter ego: (Dr.) Raymond Solar; Phil Seleski; Frank and Helena Seleski; Philip Solar
- Notable aliases: Doctor Solar; Man of the Atom
- Abilities: Super-Genius Level Intelligence; Since the accident that turned him into a godlike being whose body was transformed into pure energy, Solar gained a vast array of powers including: Energy manipulation in all its forms, and can also generate, absorb, and convert energy and fire energy blasts; Atomic and subatomic manipulation; Invulnerability; Immortality; Superhuman strength, speed and endurance; Teleportation; Flight

Solar is an American comic book superhero created by writer Paul S. Newman, editor Matt Murphy, and artist Bob Fujitani. The character first appeared in Doctor Solar, Man of the Atom #1 in 1962 by Gold Key Comics and has since appeared in other incarnations in books published by Valiant Comics in the 1990s, Dark Horse Comics in the 2000s, and Dynamite Entertainment in the 2010s.

== Publication history ==
=== Gold Key Comics ===
Cover to Doctor Solar, Man of the Atom #14 (Sept. 1965). Cover art by George Wilson.

Solar was created in 1962 by writer Paul S. Newman and editor Matt Murphy, with illustrations from artist Bob Fujitani, for the Silver Age comic book publisher Gold Key, a new company formed by Western Publishing who, earlier that year, had ended its business arrangement with Dell Comics. The character premiered in issue #1 of Doctor Solar, Man of the Atom in Summer 1962 (cover date October 1962) in the first batch of comics released by Gold Key, with Solar being Gold Key's first original character.

Though Gold Key did not have as large a distribution network as Dell Comics, their comics stood out on the newsstand shelves because of their cover art and their 12 cent price, a bargain when contrasted with the 15 cent price on Dell's books. Early issues of Solar out sold Superman two to one. The first two issues of Solar appeared with cover paintings by Richard M. Powers; after the second issue the cover paintings were done by George Wilson. The interior artwork in the first few issues also had unique features: the superhero, Dr. Solar, did not have a costume until the fifth issue, rectangular word balloons and no black holding line around each panel. Following the practice of Dell Comics, and thanks to Western Publishing's reputation of publishing other child-friendly books, Doctor Solar, Man of the Atom was able to be distributed without the Comics Code Authority symbol. The original creative team of writer Paul S. Newman and artist Bob Fujitani lasted until issue #5 when Frank Bolle took over the art work. With the exception of issue #7 written by Otto Binder, Newman wrote the comic book until issue #10, when Dick Wood took over for the remainder of the series. Other artists who contributed included: Mel Crawford, Win Mortimer, Alden McWilliams (issues #20-23), Ernie Colón (issues #24-26), José Delbo (issue #27).

The popularity of this original series peaked in 1965. With a price increase to 15 cents with issue #25 in 1968, and a general decline in sales in the comic book industry in the late-1960s, Gold Key cancelled the series in 1969 with issue #27. In one of Gold Key's few cross-overs, Doctor Solar re-appeared in the 1975 comic book The Occult Files of Doctor Spektor #14. In the early-1980s, with another industry contraction, Gold Key withdrew from distribution to newsstands and began publishing comics under the Whitman Comics imprint. These were distributed to retail stores (e.g. department stores, toy stores, specialty comic book stores) in poly-bagged packages of three comic books. For this purpose, Doctor Solar, Man of the Atom was restarted at #28 (cover date April 1981) with Roger McKenzie writing and Dan Spiegle drawing. This initiative was short-lived and the series was cancelled again after only four issues.

=== Valiant Comics ===
Solar next appeared in 1991 when Valiant Comics restarted the series with a new premise. Western Publishing had been distributing Valiant's Nintendo and World Wrestling Federation comics and agreed to allow Valiant to license characters from the Gold Key library. Valiant intended to use successful Gold Key characters to launch a superhero line of comics and spin-off original characters under the direction of editor-in-chief Jim Shooter, who had previously, unsuccessfully launched the Marvel Comics superhero line New Universe. With Valiant's video game and wrestling comics experiencing limited success, they launched the new line in 1991 with Magnus, Robot Fighter, followed by Solar, Man of the Atom a couple of months later.

The new Solar series began with three multi-part stories all written by Jim Shooter: "Alpha and Omega" with artwork by Barry Windsor-Smith and Bob Layton, spanned the first ten issues and told of the origin story of how the protagonist, Phil Seleski, became Solar, until the time he accidentally destroys the world; "Second Death", with artwork by Don Perlin, Bob Layton and Thomas Ryder, spanned the first four issues and tells of Seleski's attempt to prevent another version of himself from destroying the world; "First Strike", with artwork by Don Perlin and Stan Drake, spanned issues #5 to #8 and follows Solar as he fights spider aliens. These first year stories included first appearances by Eternal Warrior, the Harbinger Foundation, Geomancers, and the X-O Manowar armor - all of which would be spun off into their own series.

Valiant Comics' version of Solar by Barry Windsor-Smith

With its US$1.75 cover price, and benefiting from Valiant's heavy promotion of its superhero line and its combined direct and newsstand distribution network, Solar was returning a small profit with print runs of approximately 60,000 copies of each issue in the first year. The second year began with two tie-in issues with the "Unity" storyline with Solar appearing in the other Valiant titles that also tied into that storyline. The popularity of "Unity" significantly raised demand for Valiant products, including new issues and back issues. Solar's print run rapidly grew to peak at 360,000 copies of issue #23, which by that time, mid-1993, had a cover price of US$2.25. Following Shooter's ouster from Valiant Comics in 1992, Kevin VanHook took over the writing job and Solar editor Bob Layton also became Valiant's editor-in-chief. Steve Ditko pencilled issues #14 and #15 before Pater Grau took over until #35. During that time Solar appeared in other Valiant titles, such as Archer & Armstrong, Rai, Secret Weapons, X-O Manowar, and Harbinger Files, as well as Deathmate, and The Chaos Effect.

After Acclaim Entertainment took over ownership of Valiant in Summer 1994, VanHook continued as writer but the penciller job was divided between Andrew Wendell and Louis Small until issue #41 at the end of the year. Stephen D. Sullivan wrote the next two issues with Scott Rosema as penciller, followed by two issues by writer Christopher Priest and penciller Rik Levins. Acclaim launched a publicity strategy dubbed "Birthquake" which attracted high profile comic book writers and artists to work on their titles. Dan Jurgens took over as writer and penciller, with Dick Giordano as inker, beginning with issue #46 until issue #51 when Tom Grindberg took over as penciller for four issues. As sales continued to fall, Tony Bedard took over as writer from #52, with Aaron Lopresti, Mike Manley and Jeff Johnson dividing the penciller job, until the series was cancelled with issue #60 in 1996.

=== Acclaim Comics ===
Acclaim cancelled the remainder of the Valiant titles in 1996 and restarted a select few under a new creative direction with Fabian Nicieza as editor-in-chief. They published the one-shot Solar, Man of the Atom with a May 1997 cover date, written by Warren Ellis, and penciled by Darick Robertson. It was followed by a second one-shot Solar, Man of the Atom: Revelations (cover date November 1997) by Jim Krueger, Patrick Zircher and Jimmy Palmiotti. Acclaim's final attempt at Solar was the four-issue mini-series Solar, Man of the Atom: Hell on Earth by Christopher Priest, Patrick Zircher, ChrisCross, and Romeo Tanghal. While Acclaim continued to publish comics for several more years, the rights to Solar lapsed and reverted to Classic Media, which had acquired Western Publishing's properties in 2001.

=== Dark Horse Comics ===
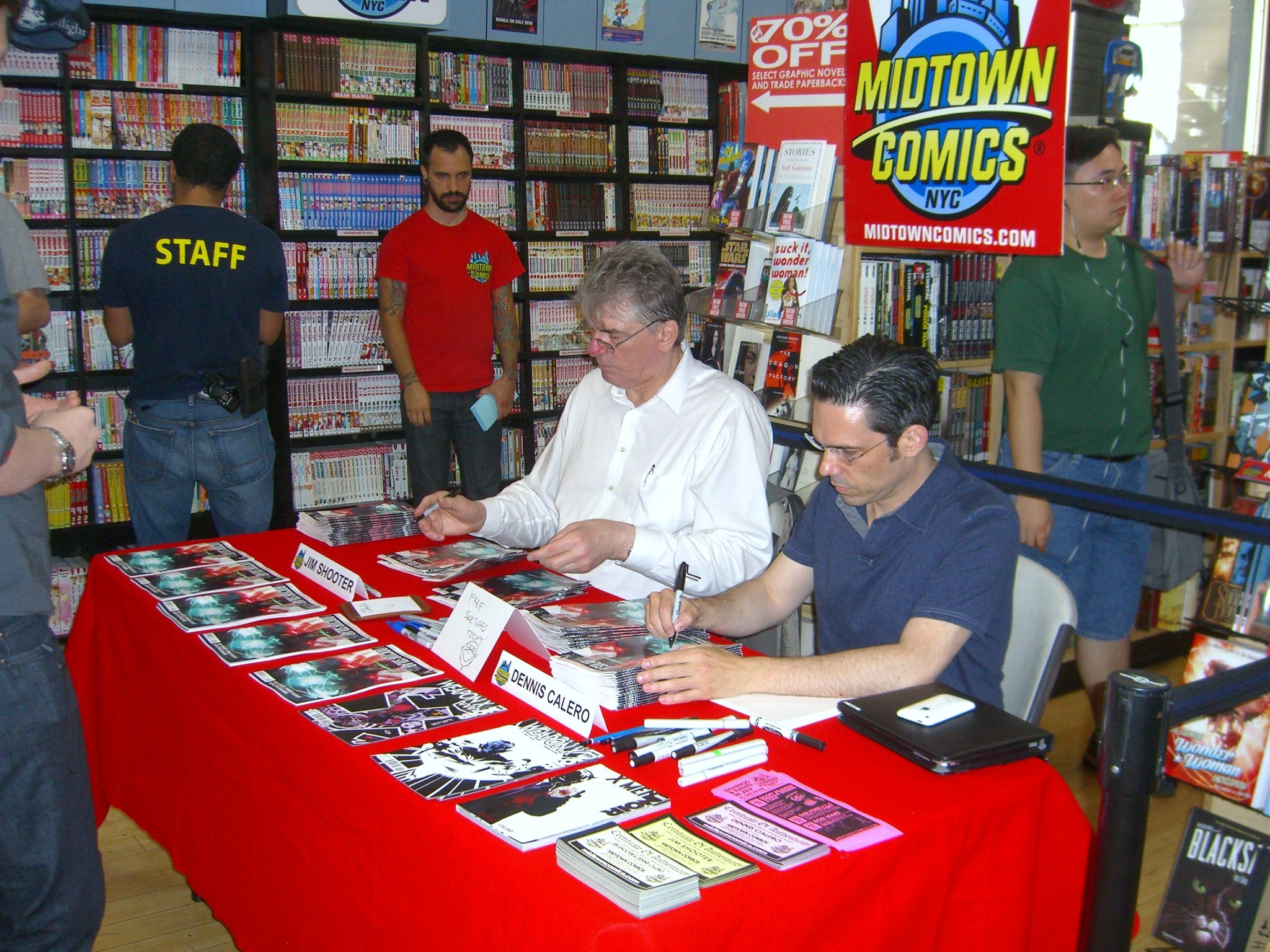
Writer Jim Shooter and artist Dennis Calero at a signing for Dark Horse Comics' Doctor Solar, Man of the Atom #1, at Midtown Comics Times Square, July 17, 2010

Amid an industry-wide resurgence in the popularity of publishing high quality reprint collections, such as Marvel Golden Age Masterworks and the DC Archive series, Dark Horse Comics acquired the rights to reprint Dell and Gold Key comics. Dark Horse published a four volume hard-cover series that reprinted the entire Gold Key Doctor Solar series, including his appearance in The Occult Files of Dr. Spektor #14, with the first volume being released in 2004 covering issue 1 to 7. The second and third volumes were released in 2005 and covered issues 8 to 22. The final volume was released two years later, in 2007, covering issues 23 to 31 as well as the Dr. Spektor issue.

In 2008, Dark Horse Comics announced that the company intended to publish an original Solar series, as well as other Gold Key characters. A year later, at San Diego Comic-Con, Dark Horse announced Jim Shooter would be the new series' writer. The new Solar series ran for eight issues, plus a preview issue. A trade paperback collection was released that collected the preview issue and #1-4 of the comic in its first volume, and the remaining issues (#5-8) in its second volume.

=== Dynamite Entertainment ===
In 2013, Dynamite Entertainment acquired the publishing rights to Solar, Turok, Magnus: Robot Fighter and Doctor Spektor. Dynamite released a Solar: Man of The Atom ongoing series; it lasted for 12 issues, from March 2014 to February 2015.

== Fictional character biography ==
=== Gold Key Comics ===
The original Doctor Solar was a physicist named Dr. Raymond Solar who attempted to assist fellow worker Dr. Bently avert an imminent meltdown of the nuclear power plant where they worked. It had been sabotaged by Dr. Rasp, agent of an evil mastermind named Nuro. Bently lost his life trying to prevent the meltdown, while Solar absorbed a massive amount of radiation in the process. He survived and discovered that he had gained the ability to convert his body into any kind of nuclear energy. Using his new powers, Solar began searching for Nuro, who would become his nemesis. Nuro used a robot double of himself called Orun and later transferred his mind into it, calling himself King Cybernoid.

The character was initially envisioned as a "post-modern superhero" who didn't wear a traditional superhero outfit, but readers wrote in and demanded a costume. In the fifth issue, Doctor Solar donned a superhero costume, and became known as "The Man of the Atom". In addition, his skin turned green whenever he used his powers. Solar's first name was revealed to be Raymond in the "Solar's Science Forum" column in issue #21. The name Raymond would not be used in story until issues #29-31.

=== Valiant Comics ===
This version, known simply as Solar, was a physicist named Phil Seleski. Seleski was a fan of the Gold Key line, especially the adventures of Doctor Solar. One day, Seleski and his colleagues were testing a new type of fusion reactor located in the town of Muskogee. When an accidental breach threatened to obliterate the entire city, Seleski rushed to shut down the reactor. He succeeded, but he was exposed to lethal doses of radiation in the process. However, this did not prove to be fatal, but rather, gave him the ability to manipulate all forms of matter and energy. Seleski tried to use his powers for the good of mankind by attempting to destroy the world's supply of nuclear weapons. The U.S. government attempted to stop him and their efforts caused Seleski to lose control of his powers, which in turn caused Earth to fall into a giant black hole.

Seleski was thrown several weeks back in time. The guilt over his role in the destruction of his world caused him to split into two beings: Doctor Solar, who believed himself to be Seleski's childhood hero; and Phil Seleski, who retained all the memories of the original. Seleski sought to prevent the accident that gave him his powers from taking place. His efforts were complicated by the presence of Doctor Solar, who was convinced that Seleski was a dangerous criminal. Eventually, Seleski convinced his alter-ego that they needed to work together, and the two of them fused with the past version of Seleski and prevented the accident. In the process, they discovered that Seleski's fusion reactor was actually a "wish machine" that allowed anyone in close proximity to change the universe in any way they saw fit. Before the original accident, Seleski wished that he could become his childhood superhero. As a result, the reactor simulated the events that gave the original Doctor Solar his powers. Seleski also found out that he did not travel to the past but instead recreated his universe after falling into the black hole. However, this universe was now populated by a large number of super-powered beings. The revelations inspired Seleski to take up the mantle of his childhood hero, becoming known as Solar, Man of the Atom.

Solar went on to have several adventures, fighting a wide variety of threats such as the Spider Aliens, malevolent Harbingers and Mothergod. He survived for several centuries and blew himself up in 4000 A.D. in an effort to stop the Spider Alien invasion of Earth.

=== Acclaim Comics ===
The Seleski twins, Frank and Helena, were transformed into the Acclaim Universe's Solar after Phil Seleski left them a portion of his powers.

== Powers and abilities ==
Dr. Solar is a trained scientist, specializing in nuclear physics. Because he has been irradiated, he is now, in effect, a living nuclear battery. No longer dependent on food and water – in fact, no longer having either a heartbeat or a human metabolism – he obtains the energy he needs by exposing himself to nuclear radiation. After absorbing this radiation, especially in large amounts, his skin turns green. It is often several hours before his skin color returns to normal, especially if he has absorbed a larger amount of energy than normal. As a result, he has to wear clothing impregnated with cadmium and lead, and wear specially made dark glasses to protect his co-workers from radiation poisoning. The uniform he later adopts is also lined with cadmium and lead. A visor shields his eyes. On his belt there is almost always a small pouch containing radioisotopes, in pill or capsule form, which he can swallow to boost his energy level in an emergency.

As with any battery, Solar becomes weaker as he draws upon his stored-up energy for various purposes. If too much energy is expended, however, Solar weakens rapidly. More than once, he has nearly died when his energy reserves were depleted too rapidly or too greatly. In some cases, Solar has absorbed so much energy that he has grown to an enormous size, only to shrink back to normal dimensions once the excess energy has been expended. In one case, he absorbed energy from a pile of nuclear waste that his arch-enemy, Nuro, was using to power a gold accumulator in the Pacific Ocean. Fearing that he would lose so much energy that he would not be able to maintain control over his own atomic structure, Solar was forced to retreat. He later resolved this problem, and then returned to destroy the accumulator, thereby foiling Nuro's plot.

Solar can draw upon his stored-up energy at will, releasing and directing it into virtually any form he chooses. He can also use it to defy gravity, thus giving him the power of flight. He can also produce a "heat exchange" effect to reduce an object's temperature to absolute zero in a matter of seconds. He can also manipulate matter at the atomic and sub-atomic level, although the energy cost is usually quite high. In one instance, Solar was able to change a huge iron meteorite into titanium through a form of neutron bombardment called "transmutation", although his nuclear reserves were almost fatally depleted in the process (he was able to restore his energy by flying a small satellite rocket into the Van Allen radiation belt). Finally, if his energy level is high enough, he can travel through time, and has done so on several occasions.

As a scientist at a government nuclear research facility known as "Atom Valley", Solar is constantly engaged in nuclear and nuclear-related research. His unique powers enable him to work without the need for lead shielding, since he can absorb radiation and store it up for his own use. In addition, in his secret identity of "The Man of the Atom", Solar is always ready to use his powers to aid the public when the need arises.

== Collected editions ==
=== Valiant Comics ===
- Solar, Man of the Atom: Alpha and Omega hardcover slipcase (March 1994) - collects # 1–10 (back-up stories); written by Jim Shooter; art by Barry Windsor-Smith and Bob Layton (Includes poster of all 10 issues' two-page pin-ups to form the gigantic page of the climax of the origin story.)
- Solar, Man of the Atom: Alpha and Omega trade paperback format edition (March 1994) (Includes poster of all 10 issues' two-page pin-ups to form the gigantic page of the climax of the origin story.)
- Solar, Man of the Atom: Second Death trade paperback (September 1994) - collects # 1–4 (lead stories); written by Jim Shooter; art by Don Perlin and Bob Layton

=== Dark Horse ===
- Doctor Solar, Man of the Atom Archives Volume 1 ISBN 1-59307-285-6 (reprints #1–7)
- Doctor Solar, Man of the Atom Archives Volume 2 ISBN 1-59307-327-5 (reprints #8–14)
- Doctor Solar, Man of the Atom Archives Volume 3 ISBN 1-59307-374-7 (reprints #15–22)
- Doctor Solar, Man of the Atom Archives Volume 4 ISBN 1-59307-825-0 (reprints #23–31, The Occult Files of Dr. Spektor #14)
- Doctor Solar, Man of the Atom Volume 1 ISBN 1-59582-603-3 (reprints Free Comic Book Day: Doctor Solar: Man of the Atom/Magnus, Robot Fighter and issues #1-4 of the Dark Horse Comics series Doctor Solar, Man of the Atom)
- Doctor Solar, Man of the Atom Volume 2 ISBN 1-59582-921-0 (reprints issues #5-8 of the Dark Horse Comics Doctor Solar, Man of the Atom series)
