= Gold Key Comics =

American comic book publisher

- Founded: 1962; 64 years ago
- Successor: Gold Key Entertainment LLC
- Country of origin: United States
- Publication types: Comic books
- Owner: Gold Key Entertainment LLC

Gold Key Comics was an imprint of American company Western Publishing, created for comic books distributed to newsstands. Also known as Whitman Comics, Gold Key operated from 1962 to 1984. It was later revived and taken over by Gold Key Entertainment LLC which holds the trademark today.

== History ==
Gold Key Comics was created in 1962, when its parent, Western Publishing Company, switched to in-house publishing rather than packaging content for branding and distribution by its business partner, Dell Comics. Hoping to make their comics more like traditional children's books, they initially eliminated panel line-borders, using just the panel, with its ink and artwork evenly edged, but not bordered by a "container" line. Within a year, they had reverted to using inked panel borders and oval balloons. They experimented with new formats, including Whitman Comic Book, a black-and-white, 136-page, hardcover series consisting of reprints, and Golden Picture Story Book, a tabloid-sized, 52-page, hardcover containing new material. In 1967, Gold Key reprinted a number of selected issues of their comics under the title Top Comics. They were packaged in plastic bags containing five comics each and were sold at gas stations and various eateries. Like Dell, Gold Key was one of the few major American comic book publishers never to display the Comics Code Authority seal on its covers, trading instead on the reputation of its child-friendly stories.

=== Properties ===
Gold Key featured a number of licensed properties and several original titles, including a number of publications that were spun off from Dell's Four Color series, or were published as stand-alone titles. Gold Key maintained decent sales numbers throughout the 1960s, due to its offering of many titles based upon popular TV series of the day, as well as numerous titles based on both Walt Disney Studios and Warner Bros. animated properties. It was also the first company to publish comic books based upon the then current NBC TV series Star Trek. While some titles, such as Star Trek and The Twilight Zone, were published for many years, many other licensed titles were characterized by short runs, sometimes publishing no more than one or two issues. Gold Key considered suing over the similarly themed television series Lost in Space for its resemblance to the preexisting Space Family Robinson, but decided their business relationship with CBS and Irwin Allen was more important than any monetary reward resulting from such a suit; as a result, the Gold Key series adopted the branding Space Family Robinson Lost in Space with issue #15 (Jan. 1966), though its narrative had no connection to the TV series.

Editor Chase Craig stated that Gold Key would launch titles with Hanna-Barbera characters with direct adaptations of episodes of the program because "[t]he studio had approval rights and the people there could get pointlessly picky about the material ... but they rarely bothered looking at any issue after the first few. Therefore, it simplified the procedure to do the first and maybe the second issue as an adaptation. They couldn't very well complain that a plot taken from the show was inappropriate".

Over the years, Gold Key lost several properties, including the King Features Syndicate characters (Popeye, Flash Gordon, The Phantom, etc.), to King Comics in 1966, numerous, but not all, Hanna-Barbera characters also to Charlton Comics in 1970, and Star Trek to Marvel Comics in 1979.

=== Creators ===
The stable of writers and artists built up by Western Publishing during the Dell Comics era mostly continued into the Gold Key era. In the mid-1960s, a number of artists were recruited by the newly formed Disney Studio Program and thereafter divided their output between the Disney Program and Western. Writer/artist Russ Manning and editor Chase Craig launched the Magnus, Robot Fighter science-fiction series in 1963. Jack Sparling co-created the superhero Tiger Girl with Jerry Siegel in 1968, drew the toyline tie-in Microbots one-shot, and illustrated comic book adaptations of the television series Family Affair and Adam-12. Dan Spiegle worked on Space Family Robinson, The Green Hornet, The Invaders, Korak, Son of Tarzan, Brothers of the Spear, and many of Gold Key's mystery/occult titles. Artist George Wilson painted covers for many of Gold Key's titles from 1962 to the early 1980s. Among the other creators at Gold Key were writers Donald F. Glut, Len Wein, Bob Ogle, John David Warner, Steve Skeates, and Mark Evanier; and artists Cliff Voorhees, Joe Messerli, Carol Lay, Jesse Santos, and Mike Royer. Glut created and wrote several series including The Occult Files of Dr. Spektor, Dagar the Invincible, and Tragg and the Sky Gods. Also in the 1970s, writer Bob Gregory started drawing stories, mostly for Daisy and Donald. Artist/writer Frank Miller had his first published comic book artwork in The Twilight Zone for Gold Key in 1978.

Diana Gabaldon began her career writing for Gold Key, initially sending a query that stated, "I've been reading your comics for the last 25 years, and they've been getting worse and worse. I'm not sure if I could do better myself, but I'd like to try." Editor Del Connell provided a script sample and bought her second submission.

According to former Western Publishing writer Mark Evanier, during the mid-1960s, comedy writer Jerry Belson, whose writing partner at the time was Garry Marshall, also did scripts for Gold Key while writing for leading TV sitcoms like The Dick Van Dyke Show. Among the comics for which he wrote were The Flintstones, Uncle Scrooge, Daffy Duck, Bugs Bunny, The Three Stooges, and Woody Woodpecker.

Leo Dorfman, creator of Ghosts for DC Comics, also produced supernatural stories for Gold Key's similarly themed Twilight Zone, Ripley's Believe it or Not, Boris Karloff Tales of Mystery, and Grimm's Ghost Stories. One of Gold Key's editors at the time told Mark Evanier, "Leo writes stories and then he decides whether he's going to sell them to DC [for Ghosts] or to us. He tells us that if they come out good, they go to us and if they don't, they go to DC. I assume he tells DC the opposite."

Editor Frank Tedeschi, who left in 1973 for a job in book publishing, helped bring in such new comics professionals as Walt Simonson, Gerry Boudreau, and John David Warner.

=== Later years ===
During the 1970s, the entire comics industry experienced a downswing and Gold Key was among the hardest hit. Its editorial policies had not kept pace with the changing times, and suffered an erosion of its base of sales among children, who instead of buying comic books, could now watch cartoons and other entertainment on television for free. It is also alleged by Carmine Infantino that in the mid to late 1960s, DC Comics attempted to pressure Gold Key from the comics business through sheer volume of output. Among the original titles launched by Gold Key in the 1970s were Baby Snoots and Wacky Witch. By 1977, many of the company's series had been cancelled and the surviving titles featured more reprinted material, although Gold Key was able to obtain the rights to publish a comic book series based upon Buck Rogers in the 25th Century between 1979 and 1981. It also lost the rights to publish Star Trek-based comic books to Marvel Comics just prior to the revival of the franchise via Star Trek: The Motion Picture, with the final Gold Key-published Star Trek title being issued in March, 1979.

In this period, Gold Key experimented with digests with some success. In a similar manner, to explore new markets in the mid-1970s, it produced a four-volume series, with somewhat better production values and printing aimed at the emerging collector market, containing classic stories of the Disney characters by Carl Barks and Floyd Gottfredson (Best of Walt Disney's Comics). In the late 1970s, somewhat higher-grade reprints of various licensed characters were also aimed at new venues (Dynabrites), plus Starstream, a four-issue series adapting classic science fiction stories by authors such as Isaac Asimov and John W. Campbell. Golden Press released trade paperback reprint collections such as Walt Disney Christmas Parade, Bugs Bunny Comics-Go-Round, and Star Trek: The Enterprise Logs.

In the late 1970s, the distribution of comic books on spinners and racks at newsstands, drug stores, and supermarkets continued, but Western Publishing also sold packages of three comics in a plastic bag to toy and department stores, gas stations, airports, and bus/train stations, "as well as other outlets that weren't conducive to conventional comic racks". The newsstand comics were returnable; the dealer could return unsold copies to the distributor for a refund, but the bagged comics were not. To discourage unscrupulous dealers from opening the plastic bags and returning the nonreturnable issues, Western published the newsstand versions under the Gold Key Comics label, and put the Whitman Comics logo on the bagged versions, although otherwise the issues were identical.

Western, at one point, also distributed bagged comics from its rival DC Comics under the Whitman logo, as well as that of Marvel Comics, with its diamond (before the direct market even arrived). Former DC Comics executive Paul Levitz stated, "[The] Western program was enormous — even well into the 1970s, they were taking very large numbers of DC titles for distribution (I recall 50,000+ copies offhand)."

In 1979, Western ceased to be an independent company when Mattel Inc. purchased the company. The new management stopped selling returnable comics at newsstands, preferring the nonreturnable bagged comics sold at toy stores.

In a 1993 interview, Del Connell, the managing editor at Western's West Coast office in the late 1970s, recalled,

...the Western comics line was killed by distribution. Perhaps you know that by early 1980 our comics were only being distributed in bagged sets of three. The Whitman label replaced the Gold Key imprint at that time as the comics could no longer be found on the newsstands, but in department, variety, and grocery stores. Our new management assumed that comics could be treated like coloring books or puzzles. That proved an ill-fated decision. The following years were characterized by delays and erratic distribution.

Eventually, arrangements were made to distribute these releases to the nascent national network of comic-book stores. Western also prepared a prospectus in the early 1980s for a deluxe Carl Barks reprint project aimed at the collector market that was never published.

In December 1983, a struggling Mattel sold Western Publishing to real-estate investor Richard A. Bernstein. Bernstein closed Western's comic-book publishing division in 1984.

=== Relaunches, reprints, and legacy ===
Three of Gold Key's original characters, Magnus, Robot Fighter, Doctor Solar, and Turok, Son of Stone, were used in the 1990s to launch Valiant Comics' fictional universe.

Dark Horse Comics (and later, Dynamite Entertainment) have published reprints, including several in hardcover collections, of such original Gold Key titles as Magnus, Robot Fighter; Doctor Solar; Mighty Samson; M.A.R.S. Patrol; Turok: Son of Stone; The Occult Files of Doctor Spektor; Dagar the Invincible; Boris Karloff's Tales of Mystery; Space Family Robinson; Flash Gordon; the Jesse Marsh drawn Tarzan; and some of the Russ Manning-produced Tarzan series. They started several revivals of characters under Jim Shooter, including Doctor Solar, Magnus, Turok, and Mighty Samson. The Checker Book Publishing Group, in conjunction with Paramount Pictures, began reprinting the Gold Key Star Trek series in 2004. Hermes Press reprinted the three series based on Irwin Allen's science-fiction TV series, as well as Gold Key's Dark Shadows, My Favorite Martian, and the Phantom.

Bongo Comics published a parody of Gold Key in Radioactive Man #106 (volume 2 #6, Nov. 2002) with script/layout by Batton Lash and finished art by Mike DeCarlo that Tony Isabella dubbed "a nigh-flawless facsimile of the Gold Key comics published by Western in the early 1960s...from the painting with tasteful come-on copy on the front cover to the same painting, sans logo or other type, presented as a "pin-up" on the back cover".

In June 2001, DIC Entertainment announced they would purchase Golden Books Family Entertainment for US$170 million (equivalent to $309 million in 2025) and take it out of bankruptcy. However, DIC would pass off the purchase due to high costs and instead Golden Books Family Entertainment was eventually acquired jointly by Classic Media, owner of the catalog of United Productions of America, and book publisher Random House in a bankruptcy auction for the lower $84.4 million (equivalent to $153.5 million in 2025) on August 16, 2001. In turn, Random House, and Classic Media gained ownership of Golden Books' entertainment catalog (including the family entertainment catalog of Broadway Video which includes the pre-1974 library of Rankin/Bass Productions and the library of Total Television), as well as production, licensing, and merchandising rights for Golden Books' characters and the Gold Key Comics catalogs, while Random House gained Golden Books' book publishing properties. Random House had previously acquired Dell Publishing through a series of mergers since 1976, effectively reuniting the remnants Gold Key Comics and Dell Comics.

On July 23, 2012, Classic Media was acquired by DreamWorks Animation for $155 million (equivalent to $217 million in 2025) and renamed DreamWorks Classics. On July 1, 2013, Random House merged with the Penguin Group, forming a new company called Penguin Random House. In April 2016, the acquisition of DreamWorks Animation by NBCUniversal was announced.

In 2021, comics creator and hacker Robert Willis obtained a trademark registration for a logo identical to the original Gold Key logo. Later that year the trademark registration was purchased by the newly-formed Gold Key Entertainment LLC. Gold Key Entertainment LLC consists of comic book enthusiasts Lance Linderman, Adam Brooks, Mike Dynes, and Arnold Guerrero. Linderman describes trading a copy of Teenage Mutant Ninja Turtles #1 to Willis for the rights to Gold Key, in a YouTube interview with Carlos Collects Comics. Gold Key Entertainment is currently working with creators to produce new titles.

== List of titles ==
=== # ===
- 101 Dalmatians (February 1970)
- 20,000 Leagues Under the Sea (December 1963)
- 55 Days at Peking (September 1963)
- 77 Sunset Strip #1–2 (November 1962–February 1963)

=== A ===
- Adam-12 #1–10 (December 1973–February 1976)
- The Addams Family #1–3 (October 1974–April 1975, based on the 1974 Hanna-Barbera animated series)
- The Adventures of Robin Hood (March 1974–January 1975, based on the 1973 Disney film)
- Alice in Wonderland (March 1965)
- The Amazing Chan and the Chan Clan #1–4 (May 1973–February 1974)
- Andy Panda #1–23.4 (August 1973–January 1978)
- Annie Oakley and Tagg #1 (July 1965)
- The Aristocats (March 1971)
- The Aristokittens #1–9 (October 1971–October 1975, retitled The Aristokittens and O'Malley the Alley Cat from #3)
- Astro Boy #1 (August 1965)
- Atom Ant #1 (January 1966)
- Augie Doggie #1 (October 1963)

=== B ===
- Baby Snoots #1–22 (August 1970–November 1975)
- Baloo and Little Britches (Mowgli) #1 (April 1968)
- Bambi (September 1963)
- Bamm-Bamm and Pebbles Flintstone #1 (October 1964)
- The Banana Splits #1–8 (January 1970–October 1971)
- Barney Google and Snuffy Smith #1 (April 1964)
- Battle of the Planets #1–10 (June 1979–December 1980)
- The Beagle Boys #1–47 (November 1964–December 1978)
- The Beagle Boys vs. Uncle Scrooge #1–12 (March 1979–February 1980)
- Beatles - Yellow Submarine (1968)
- Beep Beep the Road Runner #1–88 (October 1966–February 1980)
- Beetle Bailey #39–53 (November 1962–May 1966)
- Ben Casey Film Stories #1 (1962)
- Beneath the Planet of the Apes (December 1970)
- The Best of Bugs Bunny #1–2 (October 1966–October 1968)
- The Best of Donald Duck #1 (November 1965)
- The Best of Donald Duck and Uncle Scrooge #1–2 (1964–September 1967)
- The Best of Uncle Scrooge and Donald Duck #1 (November 1966)
- Big Red (November 1962)
- The Black Hole #1–4 (March–September 1980, the later two issues are set after the events of the film)
- Blackbeard's Ghost (June 1968)
- Blake Harper, City Surgeon #1 (August 1963)
- Bonanza #1–37 (August 1962–August 1970)
- Boris Karloff Tales of Mystery #3–97 (April 1963–February 1980, based upon the TV series Thriller and continued from #2 of the former title)
- Boris Karloff Thriller #1–2 (October 1962–January 1963, based upon the TV series Thriller)
- Brothers of the Spear #1–18 (June 1972–May 1982, originally a backup series in Tarzan)
- Buck Rogers #1 (October 1964, adapting the comic strip)
- Buck Rogers in the 25th Century #1–16 (1964; July 1979–May 1982. Issue #2-16 based on the TV series; issue #1 was based on the original comic strip)
- Buffalo Bill Jr. #1 (June 1965)
- Bugs Bunny #86–218 (October 1962–March 1980)
- Bugs Bunny and Porky Pig #1 (September 1965)
- Bugs Bunny Winter Fun #1 (December 1967)
- Bullwhip Griffin (June 1967)
- Bullwinkle and Rocky #1–25 (November 1962–February 1980)

=== C ===
- Captain Johner and the Aliens #1 (September–December 1967)
- Captain Nice #1 (November 1967)
- Captain Sindbad (September 1963)
- Captain Venture and the Land Beneath the Sea #1–2 (October 1968–October 1969)
- Cave Kids #1–16 (February 1963–March 1967)
- Checkmate #1–2 (October–December 1962)
- Chip 'n' Dale #1–64 (September 1967–January 1980)
- Chitty Chitty Bang Bang (February 1969)
- Choo-Choo Charlie #1 (December 1969)
- Cinderella (August 1965)
- The Close Shaves of Pauline Peril #1–4 (June 1970–March 1971)
- The Colossal Show #1 (1969)
- Condorman #1–3 (November 1981–January 1982)
- Cowboy in Africa #1 (March 1968)

=== D ===
- Dagar the Invincible #1–19 (October 1972–January 1982)
- Daffy Duck #31–127 (December 1962–February 1980)
- Daisy and Donald #1–41 (May 1973–November 1979)
- Daniel Boone #1–15 (January 1965–April 1969)
- Darby O'Gill and the Little People (January 1970)
- Dark Shadows #1–35 (March 1968–February 1976)
- Davy Crockett, King of the Wild Frontier #1–2 (December 1963–November 1969)
- Dear Nancy Parker #1–2 (June–September 1963)
- Deputy Dawg #1 (August 1965)
- Deputy Dawg Presents Dinky Duck and Hashimoto-san #1 (August 1965)
- Doc Savage #1 (November 1966, the comic was to tie into an ultimately unproduced movie)
- Doctor Solar #1–27 (October 1962–April 1969)
- Donald Duck #85–211 (December 1962–September 1979)
- Donald Duck Album #1–2 (August–September 1963)
- Donald Duck Beach Party #1 (September 1965)
- Duke of the K-9 Patrol #1 (April 1963)
- Dumbo (October 1963)

=== E ===
- El Dorado (October 1967)
- Emil and the Detectives (February 1965)
- Escapade in Florence (January 1963)

=== F ===
- The Fall of the Roman Empire (July 1964)
- Family Affair #1–4 (January–October 1970)
- Fantastic Voyage (February 1967, based on the film)
- Fantastic Voyage #1–2 (August–December 1969, based on the TV series)
- The Fantastic Voyages of Sindbad #1–2 (October 1965–June 1967)
- Fat Albert and the Cosby Kids #1–29 (March 1974–February 1979)
- The Fighting Prince of Donegal (January 1967)
- First Men in the Moon (March 1965)
- Flash Gordon #1 (June 1965)
- The Flintstones #7–60 (October 1962–September 1970)
- The Flintstones at the New York's World Fair (1964)
- Flipper #1–3 (April 1964–November 1967)
- The Flintstones – Bigger and Boulder #1–2 (November 1962, June 1966)
- The Flintstones on the Rocks (September 1961)
- The Flintstones – with Pebbles and Bamm-Bamm (November 1965)
- The Fox and the Hound #1–3 (August–October 1981)
- Fractured Fairy Tales #1 (October 1962)
- Frankenstein Jr. and The Impossibles #1 (January 1967)
- Freedom Agent #1 (May 1963)
- The Funky Phantom #1–13 (March 1972–March 1975)
- Fury #1 (November 1962)

=== G ===
- G-8 and His Battle Aces #1 (October 1966)
- The Gallant Men (October 1963)
- Gallegher, Boy Reporter #1 (May 1965)
- Gay Purr-ee (January 1963)
- George of the Jungle – with Tom Slick and Super Chicken #1–2 (February–October 1969)
- The Girl from U.N.C.L.E. #1–5 (January–October 1966)
- The Gnome-Mobile (October 1967)
- Gold Key Champion #1–2 (May 1978)
- Gold Key Spotlight #1–11 (May 1976–February 1978)
- Golden Comics Digest #1–48 (May 1969–January 1976)
- Gomer Pyle, U.S.M.C. #1–3 (July 1966–October 1967)
- Goodbye, Mr. Chips (June 1970)
- The Governor and J.J. #1–3 (February–August 1970)
- The Green Hornet #1–3 (February–August 1967)
- Grimm's Ghost Stories #1–54 (January 1972–November 1979)
- Gunsmoke #1–6 (February 1969–February 1970)

=== H ===
- The Hair Bear Bunch #1–9 (February 1972–February 1974)
- Hanna-Barbera Band Wagon #1–3 (October 1962–April 1963)
- Hanna-Barbera Fun-In #1–15 (February 1970–December 1974)
- Hanna-Barbera Hi-Adventure Heroes #1–2 (May–August 1969)
- Hanna-Barbera Super TV Heroes #1–7 (April 1968–September 1969)
- The Happiest Millionaire (April 1968)
- Happy Days #1–6 (March 1979–January 1980)
- The Hardy Boys #1–4 (April 1970–January 1971, based on the Filmation cartoon series)
- Harlem Globetrotters #1–12 (April 1972–January 1975)
- Hawaiian Eye #1 (July 1963)
- Heckle and Jeckle #1–4 (November 1962–August 1963)
- Hector Heathcote #1 (March 1964)
- Hey There, It's Yogi Bear! (September 1964)
- The High Chaparral #1 (1968)
- Honey West #1 (September 1966)
- The Horse Without a Head (January 1964)
- How the West Was Won (July 1963)
- H.R. Pufnstuf #1–8 (October 1970–July 1972)
- Huckleberry Hound #18–43 (October 1962–October 1970)
- Huey, Dewey and Louie – Junior Woodchucks #1–61 (August 1966–February 1980)

=== I ===
- I Spy #1–6 (August 1966–September 1968)
- In Search of the Castaways (March 1963)
- The Inspector #1–19 (July 1974–February 1978)
- The Invaders #1–4 (October 1967–October 1968)
- It's About Time #1 (January 1967)

=== J ===
- Jet Dream #1 (June 1968)
- The Jetsons #1–36 (January 1963–September 1970)
- John Carter of Mars #1–3 (April–October 1964)
- John Steed Emma Peel #1 (November 1968, based on The Avengers TV series and retitled to avoid confusion with the Marvel comic book bearing the same title)
- John Steele Secret Agent #1 (December 1964)
- Judge Colt #1–4 (October 1969–September 1970)
- The Jungle Book (March 1968)

=== K ===
- Kidnapped (June 1963)
- King Kong (September 1968)
- King Leonardo and His Short Subjects #1–4 (May 1962–September 1963)
- King Louie and Mowgli (Little Britches) #1 (May 1968)
- Korak, Son of Tarzan #1–45 (January 1964–January 1972)
- Krazy Kat #1 (October 1963)
- The Krofft Supershow #1–6 (April 1978–January 1979)

=== L ===
- Lady and the Tramp (January 1963)
- Lancelot Link, Secret Chimp #1–8 (May 1971–February 1973)
- Lancer #1–3 (February 1968–September 1969)
- Land of the Giants #1–5 (November 1968–September 1969)
- Laredo #1 (June 1966)
- Lassie #59–70 (October 1962–July 1969)
- Laurel and Hardy #1–2 (January–October 1967)
- The Legend of Lobo (March 1963)
- The Legend of Jesse James (February 1966)
- The Legend of Young Dick Turpin (May 1966)
- Lidsville #1–5 (October 1972–October 1973)
- Linus the Lionhearted #1 (Gold Key Comics, September 1965)
- The Lion (January 1963)
- Lippy the Lion and Hardy Har Har #1 (Gold Key Comics, March 1963)
- Little Lulu #165–257 (October 1962–January 1980)
- Little Lulu Summer Camp #1 (August 1967)
- Little Lulu Trick 'n' Treat #1 (December 1962)
- The Little Monsters #1–44 (November 1964–February 1978)
- The Little Stooges #1–7 (September 1972–March 1974)
- The Lone Ranger #1–28 (September 1964–March 1977)
- The Lone Ranger Golden West #1 (October 1966)
- Looney Tunes #1–47 (April 1975–December 1982)
- Lord Jim (September 1965)
- The Love Bug (June 1969)
- Lt. Robin Crusoe, U.S.N. (October 1966)
- The Lucy Show (June 1963–June 1964)

=== M ===
- M.A.R.S. Patrol Total War #1– (July 1965–, initially titled Total War for the first two issues)
- Magilla Gorilla #1–10 (May 1964–December 1968)
- Magnus Robot Fighter 4000 A.D. #1–46 (February 1963–January 1977)
- The Man from U.N.C.L.E. #1–22 (May 1965–April 1969)
- Mary Poppins (January 1965)
- Maya (March 1968)
- Merlin Jones as The Monkey's Uncle (October 1965)
- McLintock! (March 1964)
- Mickey Mouse #85–204 (November 1962–February 1980)
- Mickey Mouse Album #1 (September 1963)
- Mickey Mouse Club #1 (January 1964)
- The Microbots #1 (December 1971)
- The Mighty Hercules (July–November 1963)
- Mighty Mouse #156–160 (October 1962–October 1963)
- Mighty Samson #1–31 (July 1964–March 1976)
- Milton the Monster and Fearless Fly #1 (May 1966)
- Miracle of the White Stallions (June 1963)
- The Misadventures of Merlin Jones (May 1964)
- Mister Ed the Talking Horse #1–6 (November 1962–February 1964)
- Moby Duck #1–30 (October 1967–March 1978)
- Mod Wheels #1–19 (February 1971–February 1976)
- The Modniks #1–2 (August 1967–August 1970)
- The Moon-Spinners (October 1964)
- Mr. and Mrs. J. Evil Scientist #1–4 (November 1963–September 1966)
- Mutiny on the Bounty (February 1963)
- The Munsters #1–16 (January 1965–February 1968)
- Mushmouse and Punkin Puss #1 (September 1965)
- My Favorite Martian #1–9 (January 1964–October 1966)
- Mystery Comics Digest #1–26 (March 1972–November 1975)

=== N ===
- National Velvet #1–2 (December 1962–March 1963)
- The New Adventures of Huck Finn #1 (December 1968)
- New Terrytoons TV Time #1–54 (October 1962–January 1979)
- The Nurses #1–3 (April–October 1963)

=== O ===
- The Occult Files of Dr. Spektor #1–24 (April 1973–February 1977)
- O.G. Whiz #1–11 (February 1971–January 1979)
- Old Yeller (January 1966)
- O'Malley and the Alley Cats #1–9 (April 1971–January 1974)
- The Owl #1–2 (April 1967–April 1968)

=== P ===
- Pebbles Flintstone #1 (September 1963)
- Peter Potamus #1 (January 1965)
- The Phantom #1–17 (November 1962–July 1966)
- The Phantom Blot #1–7 (October 1964–November 1966)
- The Pink Panther and the Inspector #1–87 (April 1971–March 1984)
- Pixie and Dixie and Mister Jinks #1 (February 1963)
- Popeye the Sailor #66–80, #139–171 (October 1962–May 1966, May 1978 – 1982)
- Porky Pig #1–109 (January 1965–June 1984)
- PT 109 (September 1964)

=== R ===
- Raggedy Ann and Andy #1–6 (December 1971–September 1973)
- Rawhide #1–2 (April–July 1963–October 1963-January 1964)
- The Rifleman #13–20 (November 1962–October 1964)
- Rio Conchos (March 1965)
- Ripley's Believe It or Not! with three subtitles: "True War Stories" (#1 and #5), "True Demons & Monsters" (#7, #10, #19, #22, #25, #26 and #29) and "True Ghost stories" (remaining numbers) - not to be confused with the three issue Harvey Comic of 1953. #4–94 (April 1967–February 1980)
- Rocky and His Fiendish Friends #1–5 (October 1962–September 1963)
- The Roman Holidays #1–4 (February–November 1973)
- Roy Rogers and Trigger #1 (April 1967)
- Run, Buddy, Run! #1 (June 1967)

=== S ===
- Scamp #1–45 (December 1967–January 1979)
- The Scarecrow of Romney Marsh #1–3 (April 1964–October 1965)
- Scooby-Doo, Where Are You! #1–30 (March 1970–February 1975)
- Secret Agent #1–2 (November 1966–January 1968, based upon the TV series Danger Man)
- Secret Squirrel #1 (October 1966)
- The Shaggy Dog and The Absent-Minded Professor (August 1967)
- Smokey Bear #1–13 (February 1970–March 1973)
- Snagglepuss #1–4 (October 1962–June 1963)
- Snooper and Blabber, Detectives #1–3 (November 1962–May 1963)
- Snow White and the Seven Dwarfs (September 1967)
- Son of Flubber (April 1963)
- Space Family Robinson #1–59 (December 1962–May 1982, retitled Space Family Robinson – Lost in Space to tie-in with the Lost in Space TV series, but with no narrative connection maintained)
- Space Ghost #1 (December 1966)
- Space Mouse #1–5 (November 1962–November 1963)
- Spine-Tingling Tales #1–4 (May 1975–January 1976)
- Star Trek #1–61 (July 1967–March 1979)
- Steve Zodiac and the Fireball XL5 #1 (December 1963)
- Robin Hood (June 1965)
- Summer Magic (September 1963)
- Supercar #1–4 (November 1962–August 1963)
- Super Goof #1–57 (October 1965–February 1980)
- Swiss Family Robinson (April 1969)
- The Sword in the Stone (February 1964)

=== T ===
- Tales of Sword and Sorcery Featuring Dagar the Invincible #1–19 (October 1972–January 1982)
- Tarzan of the Apes #132–206 (November 1962–February 1972)
- Tasmanian Devil and His Tasty Friends #1 (November 1962)
- That Darn Cat (February 1966)
- Those Magnificent Men in Their Flying Machines (October 1965)
- The Three Stooges #10–55 (October 1962–June 1972, primarily based on the animated TV series, but also standalone adaptations of later Stooges films)
- The Three Stooges in Orbit (November 1962)
- Tiger Girl #1 (September 1968)
- A Tiger Walks (June 1964)
- The Time Tunnel #1–2 (February–July 1967)
- Tom and Jerry #213–344 (November 1962–June 1984)
- Tono and Kono – The Jungle Twins #1–18 (April 1972–May 1982)
- Top Cat #4–31 (October 1962–September 1970)
- Tragg and the Sky Gods #1–9 (June 1975–May 1977)
- Treasure Island (March 1967)
- Tubby and the Little Men from Mars (October 1964)
- Turok, Son of Stone #30–125 (December 1962–January 1980)
- Tweety and Sylvester ##1–102 (November 1963–February 1980)
- The Twilight Zone #1–92 (November 1962–May 1982)

=== U ===
- UFO Flying Saucers #1–25 (October 1968–February 1980, retitled UFO and Outer Space from #14)
- Uncle Scrooge #40–209 (January 1963–March 1984)
- Uncle Scrooge and Donald Duck #1 (June 1965)
- Uncle Scrooge and Money (March 1967)
- Underdog #1–23 (March 1975–February 1979)

=== V ===
- Vacation in Disneyland #1 (August 1965)
- The Virginian #1 (June 1963)
- Voyage to the Bottom of the Sea #1–16 (December 1964–May 1969)

=== W ===
- Wacky Adventures of Cracky #1–12 (December 1972–September 1975)
- Wacky Races #1–7 (August 1969–May 1972)
- Wacky Witch #1–21 (January 1971–January 1976)
- Wagon Train #1–4 (January–October 1964)
- Wally #1–4 (December 1962–September 1963)
- Walt Disney Comics Digest #1–57 (June 1968–February 1976)
- Walt Disney Showcase #1–54 (October 1970–January 1980)
- Walt Disney's Comics and Stories #264–510 (Sept 1962–July 1984)
- Walt Disney's Christmas Parade #1–9 (January 1963–January 1972)
- Walt Disney's World of Adventure #1–3 (April–October 1963)
- Wart and the Wizard #1 (November 1963)
- Where's Huddles? #1–3 (January–December 1971)
- Who's Minding the Mint? (August 1967)
- The Wild Wild West #1–7 (August 1966–October 1969)
- Winnie the Pooh #1–33 (January 1977–July 1984)
- Woody Woodpecker #73–201 (October 1962–March 1984)
- The Wonderful World of the Brothers Grimm (October 1962)
- Woodsy Owl #1–10 (November 1973–February 1976)

=== X ===
- X: The Man with the X-Ray Eyes (September 1963)

=== Y ===
- Yakky Doodle and Chopper #1 (December 1962)
- Yogi Bear #10–42 (October 1962–October 1970)
- Yosemite Sam and Bugs Bunny #1–65 (December 1970–December 1979)

=== Z ===
- Zody the Mod Rob #1 (July 1970)

== Collected editions ==
Several classic Gold Key titles have been archived in high quality
Hardcover Collected editions : Beginning with Dark Horse comics in 2007

=== Dark Horse ===
- Doctor Solar, Man of the Atom archives volume 1 ISBN 1-59307-285-6 (reprints #1–7)
- Doctor Solar, Man of the Atom archives volume 2 ISBN 1-59307-327-5 (reprints #8–14)
- Doctor Solar, Man of the Atom archives volume 3 ISBN 1-59307-374-7 (reprints #15–22)
- Doctor Solar, Man of the Atom archives volume 4 ISBN 1-59307-825-0 (reprints #23–31, including The Occult Files of Dr. Spektor issue #14) as well.
- Boris Karloff Tales of Mystery Archives volume 1
- Boris Karloff Tales of Mystery Archives volume 2
- Boris Karloff Tales of Mystery Archives volume 3
- Boris Karloff Tales of Mystery Archives volume 4
- Dagar the Invincible Archives Vol. 1 October 2011 ISBN 1595828184 (reprints #1–9)

The Occult Files of Dr. Spektor

- The Occult Files of Doctor Spektor Archives volume 1 ISBN 1-59582-600-9
- The Occult Files of Doctor Spektor Archives volume 2 ISBN 1-59582-667-X
- The Occult Files of Doctor Spektor Archives volume 3 ISBN 1-59582-819-2
- The Occult Files of Doctor Spektor Archives volume 4 ISBN 1-59582-852-4
- Magnus, Robot Fighter Archives (volume 1) #1–7 ISBN 978-1593072698 November 2004
- Magnus, Robot Fighter Archives (volume 2) #8–14 ISBN 978-1616552947 July 2005
- Magnus, Robot Fighter Archives (volume 3) #15–21 ISBN 978-1593073398 October 2006
- Turok: Son of Stone Archives:
  - Volume 1 (collects Four Color Comics #596 and 656 and Turok #3–6, 224 pages, March 2009, ISBN 1-59582-155-4)
  - Volume 2 (collects Turok #7–12, 224 pages, July 2009, ISBN 1-59582-275-5)
  - Volume 3 (collects Turok #13–18, 224 pages, August 2009, ISBN 1-59582-281-X)
  - Volume 4 (collects Turok #19–24, 224 pages, November 2009, ISBN 1-59582-343-3)
  - Volume 5 (collects Turok #25–30, 224 pages, March 2010, ISBN 1-59582-442-1)
  - Volume 6 (collects Turok #31–35,37, 224 pages, July 2010, ISBN 1-59582-484-7) (#36 reprinted issue #14)
  - Volume 7 (collects Turok #38–43, 216 pages, November 2010, ISBN 1-59582-565-7)
  - Volume 8 (collects Turok #44–50, 232 pages, April 2011, ISBN 1-59582-641-6)
  - Volume 9 (collects Turok #51–53, 55–56, 58–59, 232 pages, November 2010, ISBN 1-59582-789-7)
    (#54 reprinted issue #26 and #57 reprinted issue #17)
  - Volume 10 (collects Turok #60–67, March 2012, ISBN 1-59582-861-3)
- Space Family Robinson-Lost in Space Archives volume 1
- Space Family Robinson-Lost in Space Archives volume 2
- Space Family Robinson-Lost in Space Archives volume 3
- Space Family Robinson-Lost in Space Archives volume 4
- Space Family Robinson-Lost in Space Archives volume 5

=== IDW Publishing ===
- Star Trek Gold Key Archives Volume 1
  April 2014 ISBN 1613779224 (hardcover)( Reprinting issues 1-6 )
- Star Trek Gold Key Archives Volume 2
  October 2014 ISBN 1631401084 (hardcover)( Reprinting issues 7-12 )
- Star Trek Gold Key Archives Volume 3
  April 2015 ISBN 1631402315 (hardcover)( Reprinting issues 13-18 )
- Star Trek Gold Key Archives Volume 4
  December 2015 ISBN 1631404490 (hardcover)( Reprinting issues 19-24 )
- Star Trek Gold Key Archives Volume 5
  June 2016 ISBN 1631405985 (hardcover) ( Reprinting issues 25-31 )
- Star Trek Gold Key Archives Volume 6
  July 2017 ISBN 1631407422 (hardcover)( Reprinting issues 32-39 )

=== Hermes Press ===
- I SPY: The Complete Gold Key Comics Collection Archives (volume 1)
  Hardcover – October 30, 2013 ISBN 978-1613450604 Hermes Press
- Dark Shadows: The Complete Series Volume One Archives (volume 1)
  second printing Hardcover – March 2, 2021 ISBN 978-1613452233
- The Phantom Omnibus: The Complete Gold Key Comics
  Hardcover – July 7, 2015 ISBN 978-1613450765
- The Phantom The Complete Series: The Gold Key Years Volume 2
  Hardcover – March 11, 2014 Hermes Press ISBN ISBN 978-1613450239
- The Phantom the Gold Key Years Volume One (Phantom the Gold Key Years, 1)
  Hermes Press (March 11, 2014) ISBN 978-1613450239
  second printing Hardcover (September 12, 2023) ISBN 978-1613452820
- The Phantom the Gold Key Years Volume Two (Phantom the Gold Key Years, 2)
  second printing Hardcover (September 19, 2023) ISBN 978-1613452837
- Voyage To The Bottom Of The Sea: The Complete Series Volume 2
  Hardcover – Hermes Press; First Edition (January 19, 2010) ISBN 978-1932563368
- Zorro: The Complete Pre-Code Comics Hardcover – Hermes Press
  Hermes Press; First Edition(November 25, 2014) ISBN 978-1613450666
