= Dagar the Invincible =

Publication information
- Publisher: Western Publishing
- Format: Ongoing series
- Publication date: October 1972 – December 1976, April 1982
- No. of issues: 19

Creative team
- Written by: Donald F. Glut
- Artist: Jesse Santos

Collected editions
- Dagar the Invincible Archives, Vol. 1: ISBN 1595828184

Tales of Sword and Sorcery Featuring Dagar the Invincible is a comic-book series created by writer Donald F. Glut and artist Jesse Santos for Western Publishing's Gold Key Comics line.

== Publication history ==
The first issue had the cover date of October 1972. The series was published on a quarterly schedule and only 18 issues were produced. The final issue appeared with a cover date of December 1976 and reprinted the first issue. Later on, a new story appeared in Gold Key Spotlight #6, in July 1977. Whitman later published a reprint issue, #19, in April, 1982.

In fall of 2011, Dark Horse Comics started a hardcover archive reprint series. The first volume reprinted #1–9.

== Series history ==
Dagar was a sword and sorcery series, set in a mythical past of warriors and wizards. There were a few secondary characters (Durak in #7, 12, 13; Torgus in #9, 10, 13). Durak originally appeared as "Duroc" in Mystery Comics Digest #7, 14 and 15, then was renamed for his debut in Dagar the Invincible.

Don Glut also tied in his other Gold Key characters such as Tragg and Doctor Spektor. In #5, Tragg's Neanderthal brother Jarn appeared. Tragg cameoed in issue #11. In issue #13, the story actually crossed over into and was concluded in issue #15 of The Occult Files of Dr. Spektor.
