= Magnus, Robot Fighter =

Fictional superhero

- Magnus, Robot Fighter 4000 A.D. #1, Gold Key Comics. Cover art by George Wilson

Publication information
- Publisher: Gold Key Comics; Valiant Comics; Dark Horse Comics
- First appearance: Magnus, Robot Fighter 4000 A.D. #1 (February 1963)
- Created by: Russ Manning

In-story information
- Alter ego: Magnus
- Species: Human; Harbinger (during the Valiant Comics run)
- Team affiliations: Leeja Clane
- Abilities: Superhuman strength, superhuman durability, extensive martial arts training.

Magnus, Robot Fighter is a fictional superhero who battles rogue robots in the year 4000, appearing in comic books created by writer/artist Russ Manning in 1963. Magnus first appeared in Magnus Robot Fighter 4000 A.D. #1, published by Gold Key Comics in February 1963. The character was subsequently published by Valiant Comics and Acclaim Comics in the 1990s, and was reintroduced by Dark Horse Comics in August 2010. Some aspects of the concept have varied with each publisher.

== Premise ==
By the year 4000, humanity has become dependent on robots. H8, the Robot Police chief of the civic sector of North Am, a continent-spanning mega-city, is damaged in a radiation accident. It seeks to promote the human dependency on robots and gradually impose totalitarian rule in the area under its control.

Magnus was raised by a robot known as 1A, a name which implies that he is the very first robot of his type ever manufactured. 1A seems to be self-aware and to possess emotions. A firm believer in the Three Laws of Robotics, 1A recognized the threat represented by the dependency of humans on robots in general, and the developments in North Am due to H8 in particular. Therefore, 1A trained Magnus to protect humans against both rogue robots, and humans who used normal robots for evil purposes. Magnus was trained from infancy by 1A in an under-sea domed house, using advanced techniques, to become a skilled martial artist who could break steel with his bare hands. In addition, 1A equipped his charge with a device that would allow him to "hear" robot-to-robot radio communications.

Leeja is Magnus's girlfriend. Robots that served as police are called "Pol-Robs" (as in police robots) and are painted black and white like city police cars. All robots have identifying numbers painted on their chest and backs. Other robots, such as taxi drivers, could be nothing more than a torso with arms and head attached to a flying automobile.

== Setting ==
Both the Gold Key and Valiant versions take place in North Am, a megalopolis that encompasses the entire North American continent. The city consists of several "levels." The higher levels are populated by wealthier individuals, often regarded as "soft" and complacent. The lowest level, the Goph Level, is populated by a hardier and less educated class known as "gophs".

Aside from North Am, Earth also features another continent-wide city in Europe and a city on the continent of Antarctica named Antarcto. The city consists of several transparent domes, inside each of which the climate is carefully controlled. Construction of these habitats was fiercely opposed, for fear of ecological damage to the fragile Antarctic system. As well, there is the area known as Himalhina, which apparently includes at least all of India and China. By AD 4000, the nation of Japan is home to 50 billion people. The major islands of Japan are covered by a single, contiguous structure known as the Host. Grandmother, a Freewill electronic network, controls virtually every facet of daily life.

== Characters ==
- Magnus, Robot Fighter
- 1A, the Freewill robot mentor of Magnus and lover of Grandmother (whom he calls "Kimi").
- Claiburne, President of North Am
- Leeja Clane, Magnus's girlfriend and future wife
- Victor Zeramiah Clane, North Am Senator and future President, father of Leeja
- E-7, another freewill who is advocating for open warfare against humanity
- Elzy, a goph woman and salvage trader, member of the Future Force
- Future Force, led by Magnus and Takao Konishi to fight the Malev Empire
- Grandmother, Freewill computer brain of Japan and lover of 1A
- Grand One, Grandmother and 1A becoming one
- H8, robot police chief, destroyed by the collective mental power of humans he had enslaved
- Torque Magnus, son of Magnus and Leeja Clane
- Malev Empire (the Malevolents), invade Earth to feed on ectotheric energy from human beings
- Mekman, a psychopathic human genius who wants to be a robot
- Mimsey, General of North Am's military
- Dr. Laszlo Noel, an anti-robot fanatic who later reforms and assists Magnus against Malev-6
- The Outsiders, a group of four adolescents inspired by Magnus
- Rai, spirit guardian and defender of New Japan
- Slagger (Tark Mulko), a goph warrior, member of the Future Force
- Spylocke (Ananse), a Spider Alien in disguise, member of the Future Force
- T-1, a renegade "think-rob" destroyed by Magnus
- Takao Konishi, the 43rd Rai, defender of New Japan, leader of the Future Force, has both Harbinger and (from the "Blood of Heroes") Bloodshot abilities
- Talpa ("Mole" in Latin), a renegade robot who seeks to enslave the human race.
- Tekla, "female" robot (formerly a serv-rob named W-23), leader of robot nation of Synchron, member of the Future Force
- Tohru Nakadai, the 42nd Rai, defender of New Japan
- York Timbuc, a major, later a colonel, in North Am's military
- Xyrkol, brilliant but psychopathic alien scientist who seeks to rule North Am

== Gold Key ==
=== Original series ===
The original series, titled Magnus, Robot Fighter, 4000 AD, premiered in 1963. It was written and drawn by Russ Manning, and as a nod to its influences, included Isaac Asimov's Three Laws of Robotics as a quote in the beginning of the first issue. For the duration of the title's original run, Magnus battled rogue robots, aliens, space pirates and other threats. He fell in love with Leeja Clane, the daughter of one of North Am's senators. Leeja developed limited telepathic abilities after training by M'Ree and other humans who had acquired them as a result of their minds being linked together while imprisoned in suspended animation by H8.

The series was popular in the 1960s. As the 1970s approached, sales began to decline. The last issue (#46) was published in January 1977. Manning only completed 21 issues; the rest were reprints of previous issues or new stories by others (#23–28). George Wilson drew several covers for the series.

During the first 28 issues, another series called The Aliens ran in the back of the comic. This series ended on a cliffhanger in issue 28.

=== Backup series ===
In the early '80s, a new Magnus backup series ran in the new Doctor Solar title in issues #29–31. This was supposed to lead to a new Magnus title, but Gold Key stopped publication soon afterwards. Supposedly, there was work completed for two new Magnus issues (what would have been Magnus #47, 48), but these have never been published.

== Valiant ==
In 1991, Jim Shooter obtained rights to three Gold Key characters: Doctor Solar, Man of the Atom; Turok, Son of Stone; and Magnus, Robot Fighter. He intended to use those characters to launch his new comic book line, Valiant Comics. Several months later, the company launched Magnus, Robot Fighter.

The series began where the original one left off. The artists took great care to replicate the setting and trappings of the original stories. But as the new series progressed, it began to deviate from the original concept. The term "Freewills" appeared in the Valiant run, introducing the concept that the rogue robots seen previously were not simply the product of random malfunctions, but were the result of a common phenomenon which allowed robots to become sentient. While some of them are malevolent, others merely want to be free. It was also learned that 1A is a freewill. With Magnus's help, a colony of benevolent Freewills is established called the "Steel Nation." At the same time, Magnus becomes disgusted with North Am's elite. He journeys to the lower levels of North Am and befriends a group of social outcasts known as Gophs.

In 1992 Valiant published the popular crossover Predator Versus Robot Fighter. Valiant president Steven Massarsky recounted, "We started this project in February [1992], knowing that this time of the year [John] Ostrander would be taking things over [in] Magnus, so we want to generate renewed interest in Magnus."

As the series progressed, it was used to introduce other heroes to the Valiant Universe. In issue #5, a Japanese hero known as Rai began appearing in Magnus's title, and would eventually move on into his own series. In the sixth issue, the future version of Solar made his debut. The issue also introduced the spider aliens, who became a recurring threat throughout the Valiant Universe. In the 12th issue, modern readers were reintroduced to Turok, Son of Stone.

=== Unity ===
During the Unity crossover in 4001 AD, it was revealed that Magnus was actually born during the Unity conflict. His mother was Kris Hathaway and his father was the harbinger named Torque from whom Magnus would inherit his own harbinger ability and strength. Geomancer Geoff McHenry sensed that someone like Magnus was needed in the "future". Solar "moved" baby Magnus through time and space to the actual Valiant Universe in 3975 AD and reminded himself to pick the baby up in 3975 AD, falling from the sky, and bring it to 1-A, his robot friend, so baby Magnus would be raised and trained to become the robot fighter that he is in 4001 AD. Lastly, Solar destroyed the black hole created by Mothergod and the Unity event thus sending the Lost Land and Mothergod to "unreality."

=== The Malev War ===
Shortly after the Unity crossover, the future Earth was invaded by alien robots called Malevs (short for Malevolents) directed by the Malev Emperor, a giant hive-mind, introduced in the original series, that encompassed the planet of Malev-6 that was destroyed by Doctor Laszlo and Magnus. The Emperor took control of North Am's mainframe to easily control all robs, turning them against humanity. This invasion forced all of the future heroes to band together. Their adventures were showcased in both the Magnus series, a spin-off title, Rai and the Future Force, and other tie-ins, for a combined 37 issues over two years (1993-94).

After the Malev War ended, all future titles jumped twenty years forward. Magnus became the leader of North Am and the President of the Terran Consortium. He married Leeja (his love interest since the original series) and had a son, whom he named Torque. Magnus spent the rest of the series battling various threats. During the Chaos Effect crossover, he was transported to the 20th century, but he eventually returned to the future. The series concluded with Magnus being transported to an unknown time and place, while Torque took up his mantle as protector of earth.

== Deathmate ==
Deathmate was a joint publication by Valiant Comics and Image Comics. In this continuity, Magnus was given the name "Chris Torkelson" and was a child raised and trained by Battlestone, who was working for the Harbinger Foundation. In this series, Magnus's parents were both killed by Battlestone while trying to escape the Harbinger Foundation. Years later, Magnus would confront Battlestone about this, and fight him to more or less a standstill, while Geoff McHenry, the Geomancer of Earth, would lament that reality was literally coming to an end around them. The world ends as Magnus and Battlestone fight to the death.

== Acclaim Comics ==
In 1995, Voyager Communications, the company that owned Valiant Comics, was bought by Acclaim Entertainment. At first, it continued publishing Valiant Comics titles, but sales began to plummet after the direct market crash and the comics division was shut down. Magnus, Robot Fighter was one of the last titles to be canceled.

In 1997, Acclaim Entertainment relaunched its comic book division. All Valiant Comics characters were altered and rebooted, including Magnus. This time, Magnus was re-imagined as an insane robot fighter who, in addition to the original's strength and skills, had metallic blood that repaired his injuries. The series was much more comedic and self-parodying than any of the previous incarnations.

Two years later, Acclaim Comics closed, and Magnus's title was one of the first to go, along with most of the line.

=== "Unity 2000" ===
In 1999, Acclaim Entertainment made a final attempt to revive its comic book line, and Jim Shooter was invited to write a "Unity 2000" crossover. Due to financial troubles within the company, only three issues of six were published. The Valiant version of Magnus played an important role in the crossover, while the Acclaim version was a background player.

== Later status ==
In 2002, the rights to Magnus, Robot Fighter reverted to Random House, which, at that point, acquired Western Publishing's assets. It made a contract with Dark Horse Comics to reprint the original series.

In 2006, ibooks Inc published a graphic novel (of novelette length) reintroducing the characters, with new extraterrestrial robotic foes. It is not currently known whether they will continue with further issues, in light of their recent bankruptcy.

In 2010, a comic that included Doctor Solar and Magnus was published for Free Comic Book Day.

The character Leeja was ranked 56th in Comics Buyer's Guide's "100 Sexiest Women in Comics" list.

== Dark Horse reboot ==
In 2009, at San Diego Comic-Con, it was announced that Dark Horse Comics would begin publishing a new Magnus, Robot Fighter series written by Jim Shooter. The first issue of the revised series was published in August 2010, with artist Bill Reinhold.

== Dynamite Entertainment ==
As of the end of 2013, Dynamite had acquired the rights to Magnus along with three other Gold Key Comics characters: Turok, Doctor Solar and Dr. Spektor. On 6 March 2014, they published an online preview of the first issue. The first issue was written by Fred Van Lente, with art by Cory Smith and cover by Gabriel Hardman.

The series ran for twelve issues from March 2014 to March 2015.

In this version of the setting, Russel Magnus works in a bucolic alpine town as a middle school history teacher who also coaches the school's martial arts team; as of the first issue he is trying to raise funds to get the team to a tournament in United Korea. He is married to Moira Magnus, a mechanic who works on industrial robots, and they are expecting their first child. Humanoid robots attend Magnus' school as students, as well as being integrated into a variety of purpose-built chassis. The inhabitants of the town interact with an omnipresent avatar of 1A that appears on ubiquitous display panels.

In June 2017, Dynamite launched yet another rebooted version of the character, this time a female psychologist named Kerri Magnus who is tasked with reintegrating rebellious robots, or "AIs", into society. Her adventures were published in a limited series of five issues from June to October 2017.

== Collected editions ==
Title	Material collected	Publisher	Published date	ISBN
Magnus, Robot Fighter 4000 A.D. Vol. 1	Magnus, Robot Fighter (vol. 1) #1–7	Dark Horse	November 2004	ISBN 978-1593072698
Magnus, Robot Fighter 4000 A.D. Vol. 2	Magnus, Robot Fighter (vol. 1) #8–14	Dark Horse	July 2005	ISBN 978-1616552947
Magnus, Robot Fighter 4000 A.D. Vol. 3	Magnus, Robot Fighter (vol. 1) #15–21	Dark Horse	October 2006	ISBN 978-1593073398
Magnus, Robot Fighter Vol. 1: Metal Mob	Magnus, Robot Fighter (vol. 4) #1–4, material from Dark Horse 2010 Free Comic Book Day	Dark Horse	August 2011	ISBN 978-1595826046
Magnus: Robot Fighter Vol. 1: Steel Nation	Magnus: Robot Fighter (vol. 2) #1–4	Valiant	October 1994	TBC
Magnus: Robot Fighter Vol. 2: Invasion	Magnus: Robot Fighter (vol. 2) #5–8, Rai (vol. 1) #1–4	Valiant	TBC	TBC
Predator vs. Magnus Robot Fighter	Predator vs. Magnus Robot Fighter #1–2	Valiant	October 1994	ISBN 978-1569710401
Magnus: Robot Fighter Vol. 1: Flesh and Steel	Magnus: Robot Fighter (vol. 5) #0–4	Dynamite Entertainment	October 2014	ISBN 978-1606905289
Magnus: Robot Fighter Vol. 2: Uncanny Valley	Magnus: Robot Fighter (vol. 5) #5–8	Dynamite Entertainment	July 2015	ISBN 978-1606906644
Magnus: Robot Fighter Vol. 3: Cradle and Grave	Magnus: Robot Fighter (vol. 5) #9–12	Dynamite Entertainment	September 2015	ISBN 978-1606906989
Magnus: Between Two Worlds	Magnus #1–5	Dynamite Entertainment	April 2018	ISBN 978-1524105785

== General and cited references ==
- Magnus, Robot Fighter: Steel Nation (Voyager Communications, 1994).
- Magnus, Robot Fighter: Invasion (Voyager Communications, 1994).
- Unity Saga (Voyager Communications, 1994).
