= The Narrative Corpse =

1995 comic book

- The cover of the graphic novel The Narrative Corpse featuring the main character "Sticky". Artwork by Mark Beyer, Charles Burns, Paul Corio, Kim Deitch, Carol Lay, Gary Leib, David Mazzucchelli, Richard McGuire, Gary Panter, Kaz, Joe Sacco, David Sandlin, R. Sikoryak, and Art Spiegelman.

Publication information
- Publisher: Raw Books / Gates of Heck
- Format: 8" x 16"
- Genre: Alternative
- Publication date: 1995
- No. of issues: 1
- Main character(s): Sticky (cameos) Sarge, The Checkered Demon, The Spirit, Akbar & Jeff, Griffy & Zippy the Pinhead

Creative team
- Artist(s): Max Andersson, Peter Bagge, Lynda Barry, Mark Beyer, Chester Brown, M. K. Brown, Charles Burns, Max Cabanes, Daniel Clowes, Paul Corio, R. Crumb, Georganne Deen, Kim Deitch, Julie Doucet, Pascal Doury, Debbie Drechsler, Will Eisner, Mary Fleener, Drew Friedman, Scott Gillis, Justin Green, Bill Griffith, Matt Groening, Gilbert Hernandez, Jaime Hernandez, Kamagurka and Herr Seele, Ben Katchor, Kaz, Aline Kominsky-Crumb, Krystine Kryttre, Mark Landman, Carol Lay, Gary Leib, Jacques Loustal, Jason Lutes, Jay Lynch, Mariscal, Lorenzo Mattotti, David Mazzucchelli, Scott McCloud, Richard McGuire, Ever Meulen, José Muñoz, Thomas Ott, Gary Panter, J. Pirinen, Jayr Pulga, Bruno Richard, Jonathon Rosen, Joe Sacco, Richard Sala, David Sandlin, Savage Pencil, Gilbert Shelton, R. Sikoryak, Spain, Art Spiegelman, Carol Swain, Joost Swarte, Carol Tyler, Typex, Mort Walker, Chris Ware, G. Wasco, Willem, S. Clay Wilson, Jim Woodring, Mark Zingarelli
- Editor(s): Art Spiegelman & Robert Sikoryak

The Narrative Corpse is a chain story, or comic jam, created by 69 all-star cartoonists in the early-to-mid 1990s. A graphic novel compilation of the result was published in 1995.

Edited by Art Spiegelman and Robert Sikoryak, The Narrative Corpse features contributions from some of the most notable cartoonists of its time from the worlds of underground comix, alternative comics, and European comics (as well as Will Eisner and Mort Walker).

The Narrative Corpse graphic novel, co-published by Gates of Heck and Raw Books in 1995, had a limited run of 9,500 copies. It was the winner of the 1996 Firecracker Alternative Book Award for Best Graphic Novel.

The concept of The Narrative Corpse was based on Le Cadavre Exquis (see exquisite corpse), a popular game played by André Breton and his surrealist friends to break free from the constraints of rational thought.

== Story structure ==
The creative process was designed as follows: a cartoonist would begin the story with three black-and-white comic-book panels, starring an innocent stick figure named "Sticky". This cartoonist passes his or her three panels on to the next cartoonist, who continues the story in any manner he or she wants with three more panels. The next cartoonist receives only the previous cartoonists's part of the story, and so on.

Although the "story" oscillates without beginning or end, it can be said to start (after some creative editing by Spiegelman and Sikoryak) with the panels done by Drew Friedman, and end with the ones done by Richard McGuire.

Some contributors featured cameos by their own well-established characters (for example Mort Walker's Sarge, S. Clay Wilson's the Checkered Demon, Will Eisner's Spirit, Matt Groening's Akbar & Jeff, and Bill Griffith's Zippy the Pinhead). It is also of interest that background or guest characters seldom last more than three contributions in a row.

== Publication history ==
The idea was first conceived of in May 1990, as a project for Raw magazine. To expedite the project, two strands were started simultaneously, one in New York City by project co-editor R. Sikoryak, the second in London by Savage Pencil. Nevertheless, the project kept growing (outliving RAW itself, which ceased publication in 1991) until it was forcibly brought to an end five years after its inception.

In order to bridge the two strands, R. Sikoryak's original opening panels were cut, although he later drew the oddly-shaped "splash panel" that now begins the narrative. Spiegelman himself drew the three panels that link Strand 1 to Strand 2 (bridging the contributions of Joe Sacco and Savage Pencil), while Richard McGuire was brought in to link Strand 2 back to Strand 1 (bridging the contributions of Carol Swain and Drew Friedman).

== Contributors ==
- Max Andersson
- Peter Bagge
- Lynda Barry
- Mark Beyer
- Chester Brown
- M. K. Brown
- Charles Burns
- Max Cabanes
- Daniel Clowes
- Paul Corio
- R. Crumb
- Georganne Deen
- Kim Deitch
- Julie Doucet
- Pascal Doury
- Debbie Drechsler
- Will Eisner
- Mary Fleener
- Drew Friedman
- Scott Gillis
- Justin Green
- Bill Griffith
- Matt Groening
- Gilbert Hernandez
- Jaime Hernandez
- Kamagurka and Herr Seele
- Ben Katchor
- Kaz
- Aline Kominsky-Crumb
- Krystine Kryttre
- Mark Landman
- Carol Lay
- Gary Leib
- Jacques Loustal
- Jason Lutes
- Jay Lynch
- Mariscal
- Lorenzo Mattotti
- David Mazzucchelli
- Scott McCloud
- Richard McGuire
- Ever Meulen
- José Muñoz
- Thomas Ott
- Gary Panter
- J. Pirinen
- Jayr Pulga
- Bruno Richard
- Jonathon Rosen
- Joe Sacco
- Richard Sala
- David Sandlin
- Savage Pencil
- Gilbert Shelton
- R. Sikoryak
- Spain
- Art Spiegelman
- Carol Swain
- Joost Swarte
- Carol Tyler
- Typex
- Mort Walker
- Chris Ware
- G. Wasco
- Willem
- S. Clay Wilson
- Jim Woodring
- Mark Zingarelli

The following is a list of contributors in the order their work appears in The Narrative Corpse:
R. Sikoryak > Mark Beyer > Gilbert Hernandez > Mary Fleener > M. K. Brown > David Mazzucchelli > Mort Walker > S. Clay Wilson > Chester Brown > Debbie Dreschler > Mark Landman > Jay Lynch > Gary Leib > Willem > Carol Lay > Jason Lutes > Max Andersson > J. Pirinen > Peter Bagge > G. Wasco > Spain > Carol Swain > Richard McGuire > Drew Friedman > David Sandlin > Ever Meulen > Mariscal > Joost Swarte > Pascal Doury > Georgeanne Deen > Chris Ware > Charles Burns > Lorenzo Mattotti > Justin Green > Julie Doucet > Kaz > Gary Panter > Daniel Clowes > Jonathon Rosen > Krystine Kryttre > Jaime Hernandez > Scott Gillis > Jim Woodring > Paul Corio > Will Eisner > Carol Tyler > Max Cabanes > Gilbert Shelton > Scott McCloud > Typex > José Muñoz > Matt Groening > Joe Sacco > Art Spiegelman > Savage Pencil > Jaques Loustal > Robert Crumb > Aline Kominsky-Crumb > Kamagurka & Herr Seele > Thomas Ott > Bruno Richard > Kim Deitch > Ben Katchor > Lynda Barry > Mark Zingarelli > Richard Sala > Bill Griffith > Jayr Pulga

=== Contributors by genre ===
==== Alternative comics ====
- Peter Bagge
- Lynda Barry
- Mark Beyer
- Chester Brown
- Charles Burns
- Daniel Clowes
- Paul Corio
- Julie Doucet
- Debbie Drechsler
- Mary Fleener
- Drew Friedman
- Scott Gillis
- Matt Groening
- Los Bros Hernandez
- Ben Katchor
- Kaz
- Krystine Kryttre
- Mark Landman
- Carol Lay
- Gary Leib
- Jason Lutes
- David Mazzucchelli
- Scott McCloud
- Richard McGuire
- Gary Panter
- Savage Pencil
- Jonathon Rosen
- Joe Sacco
- Richard Sala
- David Sandlin
- R. Sikoryak
- Carol Swain
- Carol Tyler
- Chris Ware
- Jim Woodring
- Mark Zingarelli

==== Underground comix ====
- M. K. Brown
- Robert Crumb
- Georganne Deen
- Kim Deitch
- Justin Green
- Bill Griffith
- Aline Kominsky-Crumb
- Jay Lynch
- Gilbert Shelton
- Spain
- Art Spiegelman
- S. Clay Wilson

==== European cartoonists ====
- Max Andersson
- Max Cabanes
- Pascal Doury
- Kamagurka & Herr Seele
- Jacques Loustal
- Mariscal
- Lorenzo Mattotti
- Ever Meulen
- José Antonio Muñoz
- Thomas Ott
- J. Pirinen
- Jayr Pulga
- Bruno Richard
- Joost Swarte
- Typex
- G. Wasco
- Willem

==== Other ====
- Will Eisner
- Mort Walker
