= M. K. Brown =

American cartoonist and painter

- Born: Mary K. Brown Connecticut, U.S.
- Areas: Cartoonist, Artist
- Notable works: Dr. N!Godatu; Aunt Mary's Kitchen
- Spouse: B. Kliban

M. K. Brown is an American cartoonist and painter whose work has appeared in many publications, including National Lampoon (1972–1981), Mother Jones, Wimmen's Comix, The New Yorker, and Playboy, among others. She has written several books, created animations for The Tracey Ullman Show, and was a contributing artist to the "comic jam" graphic novel The Narrative Corpse. She is also an accomplished painter with work in galleries and many private collections.

Lynda Barry, cartoonist of the comic strip Ernie Pook's Comeek, lists Brown as one of her early influences.

== Personal life ==
M. K. Brown was born in Connecticut and she grew up in Darien, Connecticut and New Brunswick, Canada. She attended school at Silvermine Guild School of Art (now named Silvermine Guild Arts Center) in New Canaan, Connecticut, with cartoonist Manuel "Spain" Rodriguez.

Brown was married to fellow cartoonist B. Kliban; together they had a daughter, Kalia who is a dancer and artist. Since 1967, she has lived in Fairfax, Marin County, California. Brown was married to Gunard Solberg

== Dr. N!Godatu ==
Dr. N!Godatu

Her animated series Dr. N!Godatu (with Julie Payne as Dr. Janice N!Godatu) debuted on April 5, 1987 on The Tracey Ullman Show, airing as the sole animated short for the first two weeks then alternating with Simpsons shorts for the rest of the first season (animated by the same Klasky Csupo team of Wesley Archer, David Silverman, & Bill Kopp). Ullman show cast members Julie Kavner and Dan Castellaneta along with then-freelance voice actress Nancy Cartwright provided voices: Kavner as her receptionist Elaine, Cartwright in "Freeway" (as Pat, Dr. N!Godatu's friend who refuses to drive on freeways, through tunnels, or over bridges), and Castellaneta in "Blind Date" (as Dr. N!Godatu's date, Bill Wallhead) and "Fishtank" (as the fish tank repairmen). There were six shorts in all, each divided into four Acts. There were also two unreleased episodes (The Party and The Proposal).

Dr. N!Godatu (a character of Brown herself) is pronounced without a vowel sound preceding the N and a clicked G.

=== Episode synopsis ===
- 1 (4W02) The Office: Dr. N!godatu wore her pink slippers to work; not to worry, since she keeps a pair of pumps in a drawer for just such an emergency - but the drawer is filled with giggling pink slippers.
- 2 (4W03) Blind Date: Dr. N!godatu has a dream date with Bill Wallhead, a lawyer who's also a surgeon that previously played linebacker for the Los Angeles Rams, and in college, was voted cutest couple; unfortunately, Bill's also someone who likes to talk about himself too much.
- 4 (4W01) Freeway: Dr. N!godatu is going shopping with her friend Pat (voice of Nancy Cartwright), who never drives over bridges, through tunnels, or - until Act III - on the freeway.
- 7 (4W26) Fishtank: Dr. N!godatu's fish are doing strange things, which is nothing compared to what the two balloon-like repairmen (voice of Dan Castellaneta) are doing trying to fix it.
- 9 (4W09) The Dream: Dr. N!Godatu has a strange dream - and that guy in it looks like her blind date Bill...
- 13 (4W12) Scanner: Dr. N!Godatu breaks out a scanner that converts brain activity into a TV picture. Ah, computer programming...
- The Party: (unreleased) Pat's throwing a party.
- The Proposal: (unreleased) You remember him. Bill Wallhead. He's back and he means business.

=== Character list ===
- Dr. Janice N!Godatu
- Elaine (receptionist)
- Mr. Marsh (patient)
- Bill Wallhead (boyfriend)
- Pat (friend)
- The Carlisles (fishtank repairmen)
- Michelle (patient)

== National Lampoon magazine ==
M. K. Brown contributed various strips to National Lampoon magazine between 1972 until 1981; "Aunt Mary's Kitchen" featuring regularly from the early '70s into the early '80s, often in multi-page full color spreads. In 1983 Collier Books published the "Aunt Mary's Kitchen" cookbook of 140 recipes gathered by M. K. Brown.

- The Magic Lamp - June 1972
- Funny Pages, "Mercury, God's Own Messenger" - July 1972
- Funny Pages, "Whistle-Stop" - August 1972
- Goin' West - September 1972
- Funny Pages - "Russ de la Rocca--Worm Trainer of the Americas" - September 1972
- Funny Pages z "Beans Morocco Rides Again" - October 1972
- Funny Pages- "Bill--The Story of a Newt Who Was Eaten by His Suit" - December 1972
- The Day the Animals Discovered Death - Illustrated by M. K. Brown - January 1973
- Another "True Life" Western Romance - March 1973
- Funny Pages - "Night Ride" - May 1973
- Funny Pages, "Different Story" - June 1973
- Saga of the Frozen North, - October 1973
- Mercury, Messenger of God - February 1974
- Editorial cartoon - March 1974
- Earl D. Porker, Social Worker, - March 1974
- Western Romance - May 1974
- Funny Pages, "How to Appear Normal" and "Beans Morocco" - June 1974
- Waste Not Want Nots - July 1974
- Funny Pages, "Worms" - October 1974
- Earl D. Porker z Social Worker, - January 1975

=== "Aunt Mary's Kitchen" ===
Book cover of Aunt Mary's Cook Book.

- Aunt Mary's - 12 panel Full COLOR spread. - August 1980
- Aunt Mary's - August 1980: Aunt Mary had the strangest dream last night!
- Aunt Mary's - September 1980: Aunt Mary decides to have a slide show.
- Aunt Mary's - October 1980: Aunt Mary looks for pictures for the slide show.
- Aunt Mary's - November 1980: Leo tries to fix the Popcorn machine.
- Aunt Mary's - December 1980: Leo goes to the emergency room.
- Aunt Mary's - May 1981: You know what they say about Fig Bars!
- Aunt Mary's - June 1981: Leo has escaped from the hospital!
- Aunt Mary's - August 1981: Can I have just ONE bite of your hamburger?
- Aunt Mary's Slide Show - 11 panel Full COLOR spread. - August 1981

== Bibliography ==
=== Books authored by M. K. Brown ===
- Brown, M. K. (2014). Stranger Than Life: Cartoons and Comics 1970-2013 (Comics). Fantagraphics. ISBN 978-1606997086.
- Brown, M. K. (1995). Let's Go Camping with Mr. Sillypants (Children's book). Crown, Knopf Books for Young Readers. ISBN 978-0517597736.
- Let's Go Swimming with Mr. Sillypants - Crown, 1986
- Brown, M. K. (1992). Sally's Room (Children's book). Scholastic. ISBN 978-0590447096.
- Brown, M. K. (1983). Aunt Mary's Kitchen Cookbook (Cookbook and comics). Collier Books Macmillan Publishing Company. ISBN 978-0020093206.

=== Illustrations by M. K. Brown ===
- Ball, Duncan (1997). Selby Speaks: More Adventures of a Talking Dog (Children's book). Illustrations by M. K. Brown. HarperCollins, Trophy Press. ISBN 978-0064406765.
- Bell, Duncan (1997). Selby: The Secret Adventures of a Talking Dog (Children's book). Illustrations by M. K. Brown. HarperCollins, Trophy Press. ISBN 978-0064406734.
- Cole, Joanna; Cole, Philip (1992). Big Goof and Little Goof, Three Short Stories (Children's book). Illustrations by M. K. Brown. Scholastic. ISBN 978-0590415927.
- Big Goof and Little Goof: A Pet for the Goofs, a Change of Seasons, Bigger and Smaller - (Illustrations)
- Keyes, Margaret Frings (1991). The Enneagram Relationship Workbook (Self help). Illustrations by M. K. Brown. Molysdatur Publications. ISBN 1882042085.

=== Comic strip anthologies ===
- Pomplun, Tom (2014). Graphic Classics: H.G. Wells (Comic book anthology series). Graphic Classics series. Vol. 3. Mount Horeb, WI: Eureka Productions. ISBN 978-0982563076.
- Spiegelman, Art (1998). The Narrative Corpse: A Chain-Story by 69 Artists! (1 ed.). Raw Books/Gates of Heck Inc. ISBN 978-0963812940.
- Noomin, Diane; Lay, Carol (1995). Twisted Sisters 2: Drawing the Line. Northampton, MA: Kitchen Sink Press. ISBN 978-0878163397.
- National Lampoon's Truly Tasteless Cartoons: The Best of the Worst. Chicago, IL: Contemporary Books. 1992. ISBN 978-0809239139.
- Noomin, Diane (1991). Twisted Sisters: A Collection of Bad Girl Art. Penguin Graphic Fiction. Penguin Books. ISBN 978-0140153774.
- Novak, William (1990). The Big Book of New American Humor: The Best of the Past 25 Years. New York City, NY: Harper & Row. ISBN 978-0060965518.
- Robbins, Trina; Sienkiewicz, Bill; Triptoe, Robert (1988). Strip AIDS USA: A Collection of Cartoon Art to Benefit People With AIDS (1 ed.). San Francisco, CA: Last Gasp. ISBN 978-0867193732.
- Gross, S. (1985). Dogs, Dogs, Dogs: A Collection of Great Dog Cartoons. New York City, NY: Harper & Row. ISBN 9780060254643.
- Hollander, Nicole; Morrow, Skip; Wolin, Ron (1983). Drawn Together: Relationships Lampooned, Harpooned, & Cartooned. The Cartoonists Guild. Crown Forum, Penguin Random House. ISBN 978-0517550557.
- Young Lust #6: Taboo Issue (1 ed.). San Francisco, CA: Last Gasp. 1980. ISBN 9780867191189.
- Wolin, Ron (1979). Animals, Animals, Animals: a collection of great animal cartoons. Cartoonists Guild. New York City, NY: Harper & Row. pp. 21–23. ISBN 9780060104290.
- Stillman, Deanne; Beatts, Anne P. (1976). Titters: the first collection of humor by women. M. K. Brown's paper dolls. New York City, NY: Collier Books. ISBN 9780020407003.

== Filmography ==
Year	Title	Role	Type	Network and/or production	Notes
1987	The Tracey Ullman Show, "Dr. N!Godatu"	Script, Animation	Television	Fox	Season 1, short animation vignettes.
1991	Doug	Script	Television	Nickelodeon	ACE Award nomination
1996–1998	Things That Go Bump in The Night	Script	Television	Danger Productions, Greengrass Productions	
