= Weirdo (comics) =

Magazine-sized comics anthology created by Robert Crumb

- Weirdo #1 (March 1981), art by Robert Crumb.

Publication information
- Publisher: Last Gasp
- Schedule: (mostly) Quarterly
- Format: Ongoing series
- Genre: Underground/alternative
- Publication date: March 1981 – Summer 1993
- No. of issues: 28

Creative team
- Written by: Terry Zwigoff, Josh Alan Friedman, Dennis Eichhorn, Harvey Pekar, et al.
- Artist(s): Robert Crumb, Aline Kominsky-Crumb, Peter Bagge, Robert Armstrong, Kim Deitch, Mary Fleener, Drew Friedman, Justin Green, Kaz, J. D. King, Carel Moiseiwitsch, Spain Rodriguez, Dori Seda, Carol Tyler, S. Clay Wilson, Dennis Worden
- Editor(s): Robert Crumb (issues #1–10); Peter Bagge (issues #11–17, 25); Aline Kominsky-Crumb (issues #18–24, 26–28)

Weirdo was a magazine-sized comics anthology created by Robert Crumb and published by Last Gasp from 1981 to 1993. Featuring cartoonists both new and old, Weirdo served as a "low art" counterpoint to its contemporary highbrow Raw, co-edited by Art Spiegelman.

Crumb contributed cover art and comics to every issue of Weirdo; his wife, cartoonist Aline Kominsky-Crumb, also had work in almost every issue. Crumb focused increasingly on autobiography in his stories in Weirdo. Many other autobiographical shorts would appear in Weirdo by other artists, including Kominsky-Crumb, Carol Tyler, Phoebe Gloeckner, and Dori Seda. David Collier, a Canadian ex-soldier, published autobiographical and historical comics in Weirdo. The anthology introduced artists such as Peter Bagge, Dori Seda, Dennis Worden, and Carol Tyler.

With issue #10, Crumb handed over the editing reins to Bagge; with issue #18, the reins went to Kominsky-Crumb (except for issue #25, which was again edited by Bagge). The three editorial tenures were known respectively as "Personal Confessions", the "Coming of the Bad Boys", and "Twisted Sisters".

Overall, the magazine had a mixed response from audiences; Crumb's fumetti contributions, for instance, were so unpopular that they have never appeared in Crumb collections.

== Publication history ==
=== Origins ===
While meditating in 1980, Crumb conceived of a magazine with a lowbrow aesthetic inspired by punk zines, Mad, and men's magazines of the 1940s and 1950s.

Contributor Kim Deitch believes that another inspiration for Weirdo was Bay Area cartoonist and zine publisher Bruce N. Duncan (often credited as "B. N. Duncan.") Before Weirdo came along, Duncan published a zine called The Tele Times, covering "culture and street life in Berkeley."

In fact, said Deitch, he "first heard about Crumb’s plans to publish a new anthology from Duncan.... 'Crumb hadn’t told me about Weirdo, but he’d gotten in touch with Bruce and he definitely was one of the first people that he was buttonholing to be in the magazine.'"

As Deitch discussed at a retrospective panel on Weirdo, he believed that:

...the particular aesthetics and outsider voice of The Tele Times helped inspire the formulation of Weirdo. 'I once said to Crumb ...come on now, this magazine is inspired by Bruce Duncan, right? And he gave me a funny look and he didn’t say no. And I think my supposition is not completely incorrect.... It was fascinating for me to see: Bruce, shunned by everyone and lifted up and valiantly put forward by Crumb.'

=== "Personal Confessions" era ===
Early issues of Weirdo reflect Crumb's interests at the time – outsider art, fumetti, Church of the SubGenius-type anti-propaganda and assorted "weirdness" (in fact, Crumb provided early publicity for the Church of the SubGenius by reprinting Sub Genius Pamphlet #1 in Weirdo #1).

Crumb's detailed cover borders for most issues of Weirdo were an homage to the 1950s humor magazine Humbug (edited by Harvey Kurtzman); Crumb claimed that the elaborate Jack Davis–Will Elder cover to the second issue of Humbug "changed his life".

Dori Seda's first published comics work was in Weirdo #2 (Summer 1981), a strip titled "Bloods in Space". Her work appeared often in Weirdo through issue #24 (Winter 1988/1989), shortly after her untimely death. Dennis Worden's first published work appeared in issue #4 (Feb. 1982); he was a frequent contributor to the magazine throughout its run. Peter Bagge sent copies of his self-published comics Comical Funnies to Crumb, who published some Bagge strips in Weirdo #8 (Summer 1983). Bagge contributed to many issues from that point forward, mostly illustrating "Martini Baton" stories written by Dave Carrino.

In addition to those mentioned above, other cartoonists whose work appeared in early issues of Weirdo included Robert's brother Maxon Crumb, Robert Armstrong, Ace Backwords, Drew Friedman, Kaz, J. D. King, Spain Rodriguez, Robert Williams, Harry S. Robins (the "Professor Brainard" feature), Jeff John, Terry Boyce, and B. N. Duncan.

The magazine's letter column, "Weirdo's Advice to the Lovelorn", was helmed by Terry Zwigoff.

=== "Coming of the Bad Boys" era ===
With issue #10 (Summer 1984), Crumb handed over the editing reins to Peter Bagge (who had become a regular contributor with issue #8); Crumb continued as a regular contributor. New contributors to Weirdo during this period included Kim Deitch, Mary Fleener, John Holmstrom, Carel Moiseiwitsch, Diane Noomin, Raymond Pettibon, Savage Pencil, J. R. Williams (his first published comics), S. Clay Wilson, Ken Struck, and Ken Weiner/Ken Avidor.

=== "Twisted Sisters" era ===
With issue #18 (Fall 1986), the editorial reins of Weirdo went to Kominsky-Crumb; the "Twisted Sisters" monicker being a reference to an all-female comics anthology that Kominsky-Crumb co-produced with Diane Noomin in 1976. Bagge returned for a single issue as editor, with Weirdo #25, Summer 1989. New contributors to the magazine during this era included Lloyd Dangle, Julie Doucet, Dennis Eichhorn, Justin Green, Krystine Kryttre, Carol Tyler (her first published comics), Penny Van Horn, Michael Dougan, and Mark Zingarelli. Harvey Pekar began a regular column, "Harvey Sez", in issue #19; his column ran in most of the later issues.

Many stories published in Weirdo from the "Twisted Sisters" era were later collected in the 1991 anthology Twisted Sisters: A Collection of Bad Girl Art — including work by Kominsky-Crumb, Carol Lay, Phoebe Gloeckner, Carel Moiseiwitsch, Van Horn, Kryttre, Doucet, Sternbergh, Seda, and Tyler.

In 1991, after the publication of Weirdo #27, Crumb and Kominsky-Crumb moved their family from Northern California to France.

Weirdo was at the center of a legal case in 1986: the manager of a comics retailer in the Chicago area, Friendly Frank's, was arrested on charges of distributing obscenity. The comic books deemed obscene were Weirdo, Omaha the Cat Dancer, The Bodyssey, and Bizarre Sex. The case led to the formation of the Comic Book Legal Defense Fund.

=== Weirdo #28: "Verre D'eau" ===
Weirdo's final issue, #28, released after a three-year hiatus in 1993, was an internationally themed 68-page giant subtitled Verre D'eau (in French, "glass of water"). Promoted as a "One-Time-Only Special International Issue of Weirdo — Absolutely the Last Issue Ever!", it was co-edited by Aline Kominsky-Crumb and French editor Jean-Pierre Mercier. In addition to the usual roster of contributors, issue #28 featured work from French and European cartoonists such as Edmond Baudoin, Florence Cestac, Jean-Christophe Menu, Placid (in French), Willem, and Aleksandar Zograf.

R. Crumb's contributions to the issue — two tongue-in-cheek stories called "When the Niggers Take Over America!" and "When the Goddamn Jews Take Over America!" — got the issue banned as hate literature in Canada.

== Publication schedule and page count ==
- Issues #1–6 (1981–1982): Quarterly
- Issues #7–10 (1982–1984): Bi-annual
- Issues #11–19 (1984–1987): Quarterly
- Issues #20–24 (1987–1989): Bi-annual
- Issues #25–27 (1989–1990): Quarterly
- Issues #28 (1993): Annual (after a three-year hiatus)

Issues #1–14 were 44 pp. each, issues #15–26 were 52 pp. each, issue #27 was 60 pp., and issue #28 was 68 pp.

== Notable contributors ==
- Doug Allen
- Robert Armstrong
- Ace Backwords
- Peter Bagge
- Edmond Baudoin
- Florence Cestac (in French)
- Daniel Clowes
- David Collier
- Maxon Crumb
- Robert Crumb
- Sophie Crumb
- Lloyd Dangle
- Kim Deitch
- Julie Doucet
- Debbie Drechsler
- Dennis Eichhorn
- Mary Fleener
- Josh Alan Friedman
- Drew Friedman
- Phoebe Gloeckner
- Justin Green
- Bill Griffith
- Rory Hayes
- Gilbert Hernandez
- John Holmstrom
- Kaz
- J. D. King
- Aline Kominsky-Crumb
- John Kricfalusi (as Billy Bunting)
- Krystine Kryttre
- Carol Lay
- Joe Matt
- Jean-Christophe Menu
- Mark Newgarden
- Diane Noomin
- Gary Panter
- Harvey Pekar
- Raymond Pettibon
- Placid (in French)
- Sasa Rakezic
- Harry S. Robins
- Spain Rodriguez (occasionally credited as Algernon Backwash)
- Ed "Big Daddy" Roth
- Savage Pencil
- Joe Sacco
- Dori Seda
- Stanislav Szukalski
- Frank Stack (as Foolbert Sturgeon)
- Carol Tyler
- Willem
- J. R. Williams
- Robert Williams
- S. Clay Wilson
- Dennis Worden
- Terry Zwigoff

== Collections / exhibitions ==
In 2013, Last Gasp released R. Crumb's The Weirdo Years: 1981-'93, a 255-page collection of all of Crumb's contributions to the anthology.

In 2019, Last Gasp published The Book of Weirdo: A Retrospective of R. Crumb's Legendary Humor Comics Anthology, by Jon B. Cooke. The 288-page hardcover book "features the comprehensive story of the fondly-recalled magazine, along with testimonials from over 130 of the mag's contributors, plus interviews with Weirdo's three editors ... as well as publisher 'Baba Ron' Turner. New York's Society of Illustrators hosted an event commemorating the book's publication, with a panel of guests, including Art Spiegelman, Kim Deitch, John Holmstrom, Glenn Head, Mark Newgarden, Drew Friedman, and Cooke.

In 2022, Boston College's McMullen Museum of Art featured the exhibition "American Alternative Comics, 1980–2000: Raw, Weirdo, and Beyond", that showcased the work of a number of Weirdo contributors, including Bagge, Lynda Barry, Crumb, Doucet, Gilbert Hernandez, Kominsky-Crumb, Panter, and Woodring.

== See also ==
- Raw
- Rip Off Comix
