= Twisted Sisters (comic) =

All-female underground comics anthology

- The cover of Twisted Sisters #1, art by Aline Kominsky.

Publication information
- Publisher: Last Gasp (1976); Kitchen Sink Press (1994)
- Schedule: Irregular
- Publication date: 1976, 1994

Creative team
- Created by: Aline Kominsky and Diane Noomin
- Artist(s): M. K. Brown, Dame Darcy, Julie Doucet, Debbie Drechsler, Mary Fleener, Phoebe Gloeckner, Aline Kominsky-Crumb, Krystine Kryttre, Carol Lay, Caryn Leschen, Carel Moiseiwitsch, Diane Noomin, Dori Seda, Fiona Smyth, Leslie Sternbergh, Carol Swain, Carol Tyler, Penny Moran Van Horn
- Editor(s): Aline Kominsky and Diane Noomin

Collected editions
- Twisted Sisters: A Collection of Bad Girl Art: ISBN 978-0140153774
- Twisted Sisters, Volume 2: Drawing the Line: ISBN 978-0878163458

Twisted Sisters is an all-female underground comics anthology put together by Aline Kominsky and Diane Noomin, and published in various iterations. In addition to Kominsky (later Kominsky-Crumb) and Noomin, contributors to Twisted Sisters included M. K. Brown, Dame Darcy, Julie Doucet, Debbie Drechsler, Mary Fleener, Phoebe Gloeckner, Krystine Kryttre, Carol Lay, Dori Seda, and Carol Tyler.

Twisted Sisters was the first "breakaway project" by former contributors to the ground-breaking all-female comics collective Wimmen's Comix.

== Publication history ==
=== Background ===
In 1975, Wimmen's Comix contributors Kominsky and Noomin left that collective due to internal conflicts that were both aesthetic and political. Kominsky-Crumb later stated that a large part of her break with the Wimmen's Comix group was over feminism-related issues, and particularly over her romantic relationship with Robert Crumb, who Wimmen's Comix mainstay Trina Robbins particularly disliked.

=== Twisted Sisters one-shot ===
Kominsky and Noomin put together a 36-page one-shot issue of Twisted Sisters, published in June 1976 by Last Gasp, which featured their own humorous and "self-deprecating" stories and art. Noomin's stories featured her character DiDi Glitz while Kominsky's featured her fictional analog The Bunch.

=== Kominsky-Crumb editorial run on Weirdo ===
A decade later, the title "Twisted Sisters" was informally revived when Kominsky-Crumb took over the editing reins of Weirdo, the comics anthology started by her husband R. Crumb. Kominsky-Crumb and Noomin's own comics work appeared frequently in the pages of Weirdo during this period, as well as the work of female contributors Carol Lay, Penny Van Horn, Phoebe Gloeckner, Krystine Kryttre, Julie Doucet, Leslie Sternbergh, Carel Moiseiwitsch, Dori Seda, and Carol Tyler.

In 1991, Noomin edited and put together Twisted Sisters: A Collection of Bad Girl Art, a 260-page trade paperback anthology published by Viking Penguin, featuring the work of herself, Kominsky-Crumb, and 13 other female cartoonists. All the work in the collection had been previously published, most of it in Weirdo and Wimmen's Comix.

=== Kitchen Sink series ===
The success of that book led to Kitchen Sink Press publishing a four-issue Twisted Sisters Comix limited series in 1994, also edited by Noomin, with each issue featuring 44 pages of new comics by a number of female contributors. The limited series was subsequently collected in 1995 as Twisted Sisters, vol. 2: Drawing the Line.

An exhibition of artists' work, also called "Twisted Sisters — Drawing the Line", was held from January 19–February 18, 1996, at White Columns in New York City.

== Issues ==
- Twisted Sisters (Last Gasp, June 1976) — contributors: Aline Kominsky-Crumb and Diane Noomin
- Twisted Sisters: A Collection of Bad Girl Art (Viking Penguin, 1991) ISBN 978-0140153774 — contributors: M. K. Brown, Julie Doucet, Mary Fleener, Phoebe Gloeckner, Aline Kominsky-Crumb, Krystine Kryttre, Carol Lay, Caryn Leschen, Carel Moiseiwitsch, Diane Noomin, Dori Seda, Leslie Sternbergh, Carol Tyler, and Penny Moran Van Horn
- Twisted Sisters (Kitchen Sink Press, April–July 1994) — 4 issues; contributors: M. K. Brown, Dame Darcy, Debbie Drechsler, Mary Fleener, Phoebe Gloeckner, Aline Kominsky-Crumb, Carol Lay, Caryn Leschen, Carel Moiseiwitsch, Fiona Smyth, Carol Swain, and Penny Moran Van Horn
- Twisted Sisters, vol. 2: Drawing the Line (Kitchen Sink Press, 1995) — collecting the Kitchen Sink limited series

== Accolades ==
Twisted Sisters: A Collection of Bad Girl Art was nominated for the 1992 Eisner Award for Best Anthology. The Twisted Sisters limited series was nominated for the 1995 Eisner Award for Best Anthology.
