= Krystine Kryttre =

American alternative comics artist

- Born: 1958 (age 67–68)
- Occupations: Alternative comics artist, Painter, Animator, Writer, Sculptor, Performer
- Website: kryttre.com

Krystine Kryttre (born 1958) is an American alternative comics artist, painter, animator, writer, and performer from San Francisco. currently based in Los Angeles. Her work is dark, often explicit, and visually distinctive." Her work has been exhibited in galleries since the late 1980s, including a number of solo shows in Los Angeles.

Krystine first published her comics in punk zines published out of San Francisco. She moved to Los Angeles in 1991.

She has been published in Weirdo, Raw, Wimmen's Comix, Tits & Clits Comix, The Narrative Corpse, Comix 2000, Snake Eyes, Art Forum, Buzzard, and Twisted Sisters. Her relationship with Dori Seda is chronicled in the story "'Bimbos From Hell," originally published in Weirdo #22 (Last Gasp, Spring 1988). In 1990, Cat-Head Comics released Death Warmed Over, a collection of her comics. Cat-Head Comics described Death Warmed Over as "a beyond-beautiful collection of dark wonderment" and wrote "Kryttre's inventive 'scratchboard gothic' style has made this collection very popular."

Another collection, The #@@! Coloring Book, was released by Last Gasp in 2001.

After making comics from 1985–1992, she shifted focus to painting from 1994–2003, and taxidermy from 1994–2002. Her most recent work has returned to painting and drawing. She has also produced a series of satirical toys called "Abu & 'Mo", inspired by the atrocities of Abu Ghraib and the Guantanamo Bay detention camp.

Krystine is credited as a writer and creative producer for the segment "Anemia & Iodine" in the American sketch comedy series KaBlam! (1996) She was also an animator for Freaked (1993).

From 2002 to 2008 she was a member of the L.A.-based Corpus Delicti Butoh Performance Lab, which performed stage pieces and guerilla street theater in public spaces.

The cartoonist and critic Scott McCloud, in Understanding Comics (1993), wrote that "in Krystine Kryttre's art, the curves of childhood and the mad lines of a [Edvard] Munch create a crazy toddler look."

Writer Terri Sutton, in Artforum, wrote that Krystine's work aimed to criticize the double standards of women and show feminist visions of healthy womanhood. She wrote Kryttre, along with artists Mary Fleener and Julie Doucet, "play with aggression and victimization not to express rage but better to understand where those urges take them and how to incorporate such feelings amongst all the prescriptions attached to femininity."

Krystine was a panel member at the San Diego Comic-Con's panel "The Book of Weirdo: A History of the Greatest Magazine Ever Published" in 2019.
