= Vassilios Giavis =

American painter and illustrator (1929-2019)

- Born: December 21, 1929 (age 96); Lowell, Massachusetts, U.S.
- Died: February 12, 2019; Lowell, Massachusetts
- Known for: Painter
- Website: The Brush Gallery

Vassilios "Bill" Giavis (1929-2019) was a painter and illustrator of historical sites, diners, people, maritime scenes, cityscapes, and landscapes.

His detailed, realistic paintings of scenes throughout the New England area and Greece were rendered in watercolor, oil and acrylic. Once Giavis had an idea for a painting, it becomes one of a theme series: diners, city halls, people, historic buildings, etc. The focus of one theme produced a series of paintings revolving around the life of Lowell born author, Jack Kerouac: birthplace, church, high school, various hangouts, and his memorial park.

== Early life and education ==
Vassilios Giavis was born on December 21, 1929, and died on February 12, 2019, in Lowell, Massachusetts.

After high school, Giavis earned a Bachelor of Fine Arts degree at Massachusetts College of Art and Design in Boston, MA and then served in the United States Army for two years.

== Published work ==
Giavis’ published work includes “The Tyrants,” cover art and illustrations, Ithaca Press; United States Department of the Interior, Preservation Pan Book cover art, Lowell Historic Preservation Commission; “Doctor Sax,” cover art, Grove Press; Lowell General Hospital Annual Report cover art and poster; New England Roadside Delights, by Will Anderson, page 67; Monuments and Memory, by Martha Norkunas, frontispiece, published by Smithsonian Institution Press of Washington and London; and “Brunet’s Lunch / Lowell 1988,” Museum News, September / October 2003, “Diners Still Cooking in the 21st Century,” page 15.

== Exhibitions ==
His Exhibitions include the Masters Invitational Exhibition at the Copley Society of Art in Boston, MA; the Brush Gallery in Lowell, MA three of which were solo exhibitions; the New England Folklife Center in Lowell, MA; the Museum of National Heritage in Lexington, Massachusetts; the Boott Cotton Mill Museum in Lowell, MA; the Museum on Transportation in Brookline, MA; the Lumina Gallery in New York City; the Parker Gallery and Whistler House Museum of Art in Lowell, MA; the John Hancock Tower in Boston, MA; the Federal Reserve Bank of Boston, MA; the Boston City Hall in Boston, MA; Culinary Archives and Museum at Johnson & Wales University in Providence, Rhode Island (five year exhibit; 2003 to 2008).

== Television appearances ==
Television specials featuring Giavis are Good Morning America, CBS; Evening Chronicle, Boston NMC; “The Acre Experience,” and “Dining in Lowell.”

== Awards ==
Awards earned by Giavis include the Copley Society’s Copley Master; John Singleton Copley Award; Best Work on paper; Community Teamwork, Inc. Local Heroes Award and numerous other Honorable Mentions.

== Memberships ==
His memberships included the Copley Society in Boston, MA; the Boston Printmakers in Boston, MA; and the British Art Gallery in Lowell, MA
