= Sisterson =

Sisterson! was a short-run comic book which ran for three or four issues around 1990 and was circulated among London comic shops. "Sisterson!" was a "jam comic", i.e., a collection of comic strips each of which was an unplanned collaborative effort, with one creator drawing the first panel and then passing it on to another to be continued, usually resulting in a comic strip far more strange and unpredictable than any one artist would be likely to devise. Essentially, the comic was used as a method to teach sequential thinking and for studying the approach of other artists and creators.

Notable creators who contributed to Sisterson included Nick Abadzis, John McCrea, D'Israeli, Hunt Emerson, Woodrow Phoenix, Darryl Cunningham, Charlie Adlard, Roger Langridge, and Simon Fraser.

== History ==
"Jam comics" have many other origins: "Sisterson" was named after a particular example that took place in the Humour Comic Strip class at the London Cartoon Centre (LCC), a series of comics classes that took place at various venues in West London in the late 1980s and early 1990s. Taking an idea from then-student/future LCC course director Steve Marchant, one of the attendees, Dennis Sisterson, initiated a jam comic, and it became a regular feature of the class. Tutor Donald Rooum dubbed it "The Sisterson Game" and the name stuck; years later it re-emerged as a postal game. Among the participants at the original London Cartoon Centre class were comic artist/teacher Steve Marchant and writer Andrew Pilcher.

== Rules ==
Rules were developed over the years by various players, eventually distilling into this form: Sisterson is a game for three or more people. A cartoonist cannot draw a panel if one of his or her previous drawings appears within the two prior panels. Participants should follow the story through sequentially, panel by panel; they can not skip a panel or two because they cannot think what should go next. No "unnecessary" sex or violence.

One variety played at the LCC involved placing a panel at any unused point in the strip, not necessarily the panel following the one previously drawn, but this made things just a bit too difficult.
