= Dori Seda =

Underground comix artist

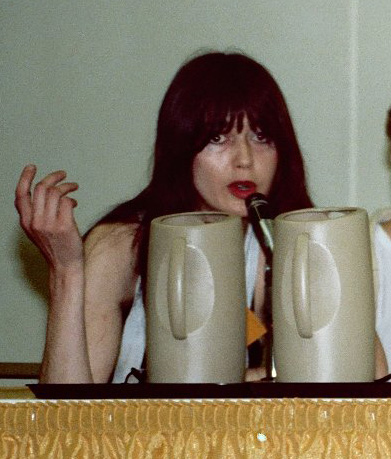
- Dori Seda on the Women In Comics panel at the 1982 San Diego Comic Con
- Born: Dorothea Antoinette Seda; June 22, 1951
- Died: February 25, 1988 (aged 37)
- Area: Cartoonist
- Pseudonym: Sylvia Silicosis
- Notable works: Lonely Nights Comics
- Awards: Dori Seda Memorial Award for Women

Dorothea Antoinette "Dori" Seda (22 June 1951 – February 25, 1988) was an artist best known for her underground comix work in the 1980s. She occasionally used the pen name "Sylvia Silicosis." Her comics combined exaggerated fantasy and ribald humor with documentation of her life in the Mission District of San Francisco, California.

== Career ==
=== Fine Arts ===
Seda was originally a painter and ceramics artist, graduating from Illinois State University with a B.A. in art. Seda emphasized that she was primarily invested in "pure" art forms, having business cards printed to read, "Dori Seda--ARTIST--San Francisco." Seda was creating a lot of fine arts content in 1979 and 1980. Some of her notable art works include Punch Bowl (with cups and ladle), The Wreck in Heaven, Vibrator with 3 Attachments for ceramics and Jaded Fish and The Vampire Painting for acrylic on canvas.

=== Comics ===
To pursue her interest in comics, Seda took a job as a janitor at the San Francisco publisher Last Gasp, and soon after became a bookkeeper there. (This work was primarily viewed as a financial necessity to Seda, her true passion being the "pure arts.") Seda worked exclusively night hours and was known as "The Vampire Bookkeeper."

Her first published comics work was a strip titled "Bloods in Space", written by Kevin Lambert, which appeared in Robert Crumb's anthology magazine Weirdo, issue #2, in 1981. Seda's comic work was centered around taboo sexual subject matters, including swinging and bestiality. Her work intended to push boundaries that individuals upheld as communal prejudices. The reaction of Seda's audience is "less an affirmation of community standards than a kind of self-righteous consumerism." She submitted her work under the pen name "David Seda" but was published in the magazine under her true name. She was subsequently published in Wimmen's Comix, San Francisco Comic Book, Viper, Yellow Silk, Prime Cuts, Cannibal Romance, Weird Smut Comix, Tits & Clits, Twisted Sisters, and her solo book Lonely Nights Comics (which was banned in England upon its release).

In 1999, her work was collected in the book Dori Stories, which also includes memorial tributes. This body of work almost was not published due to legal troubles regarding the reproduction of Seda's work. Ultimately, Dori Stories won a 2000 Firecracker Alternative Book Award in the Special Recognition/Wildcard Category "Books about Gap-Toothed Deceased Female Cartoonists with Smelly Dogs".

In 1988, Last Gasp established the Dori Seda Memorial Award for Women. The first recipient was Carol Tyler.

=== Film ===
Seda was featured in the short documentary Gap-Toothed Women by Les Blank, a tribute to women with the commonality of a gap between their two front teeth. Seda was originally cut from the film, as her interview answers were seen as bland, so Seda requested that she be given a second chance and preplanned a response that would gain greater reaction. Seda explained how she was not inherently "valuable" because she was not beautiful because of her "funny teeth." She attributed her value to the work she had done in spite of her gap saying, she was "kind of glad that [her] teeth are like this, because if I had nice straight teeth, I might never have done anything.” She created a poster for the film.

== Death and copyright issues ==
Seda died at age 37 from respiratory failure after catching the flu during a severe outbreak in San Francisco in the spring of 1988. Her lungs were weakened by silicosis contracted from the toxic fumes released by firing metallic glazes, while neglecting to wear a protective mask for her ceramics work. She was also a heavy smoker who suffered from emphysema which contributed to the deterioration of her health.

After Seda's death, conflict arose over the rights to reproduce her work. Friends of Seda wanted to collect and publish the collection that became Dori Stories, but at her death, Seda's estate passed to the next of kin, her mother. Due to the sexual nature of Seda's work, her mother did not wish to see Seda's writing in print again and refused requests to publish it. However, a year prior to her death, Seda had written a will that gave partner Don Donahue (also involved in the comics industry) full ownership of her work if she died. The will was written in a humorous tone, opening with the statement, "This is sort of a contract and sort of a will (although I don't plan on dying soon.)" Regardless, this document held the legal power of a written contract and allowed for Seda's full body of work to be published. The will was witnessed and signed by Seda, Donohue, and fellow cartoonists Krystine Kryttre and Dan O'Neill. Seda's friends successfully filed the will in 1991, conferring full ownership of her work on Donohue.

== In popular culture ==
- Dori Seda is a character in the short story "Dori Bangs" by Bruce Sterling in which Sterling imagines what would have happened if Dori hadn't died young and had instead met the writer Lester Bangs.
