= Maggie Cassidy =

1959 novel by Jack Kerouac

- First edition
- Author: Jack Kerouac
- Language: English
- Publisher: Avon
- Publication date: 1959
- Publication place: United States
- Media type: Print (hardback & paperback)
- Pages: 208 pp
- Preceded by: Doctor Sax (1959)
- Followed by: Tristessa (1960)

Maggie Cassidy is a novel by the American writer Jack Kerouac, first published in 1959. It is a largely autobiographical work about Kerouac's early life in Lowell, Massachusetts, from 1938 to 1939, and chronicles his real-life relationship with his teenage sweetheart Mary Carney. It is unique for Kerouac for its high school setting and teenage characters. He wrote the novel in 1953 but it was not published until 1959, after the success of On the Road (1957).

The original manuscript published by Avon Books in 1959 was almost immediately pulled from the shelves due to objections over profanity in one particular passage. The passage was rewritten and the book redistributed even though Kerouac reportedly objected to the changes. The original manuscript remained unpublished until 2015 when Devault-Graves Digital Editions restored the full uncut original manuscript for its print edition.

== Plot ==
Part of what Kerouac considered the 'Duluoz Legend', Maggie Cassidy tells the tale of Jack Duluoz and his romantic involvement with Irish-American Maggie Cassidy. Duluoz is a high school athletics and football star who meets Maggie Cassidy and begins a devoted, inconstant, tender adolescent love affair.

== Character key ==
Kerouac often based his fictional characters on friends and family.

"Because of the objections of my early publishers I was not allowed to use the same personae names in each work."

Real-life person	Character name
Jack Kerouac	Jack Duluoz
Leo Kerouac	Emil "Pop" Duluoz
Caroline Kerouac	Nin / Jeannette Bissonette
George "G.J." Apostolos	G.J. Rigopoulos
Fred Bertrand	Vinny Bergerac
Mary Carney	Maggie Cassidy
Margaret "Peggy" Coffey	Pauline "Moe" Cole
Johnny Koumentzalis	Johnny Kazarakis
Lou Little	Lu Libble
Charles Morissette	Jimmy Bissonette
Robert Morissette	Joe (Iddyboy) Bissonette
Omar Noel	Zaza Vauriselle
Jim O'Dea	Timmy Clancy
Roland Salvas	Albert "Lousy" Lauzon
Charles Sampas	James G. Santos
Jimmy Winchell	Eddy Gilbert
Seymour Wyse	Lionel Smart

== Trivia ==
- One of the scenes in the novel is strongly reminiscent of a scene in The Sorrows of Young Werther. In Kerouac’s novel, a blizzard rages outside during a party organized for the seventeenth birthday of Jack Duluoz. The party is the start of the estrangement of Jack and Maggie. The first time Werther meets his Lotte is during a ball in the country whilst a storm (foreshadowing Werther’s demise) is passing outside. Kerouac is known to have read Goethe.
- The fictitious name of Kerouac’s girlfriend echoes the name of Neal Cassady. Who, under the fictitious name of Dean Moriarty, would be the centre of Kerouac’s attention in On the Road. Kerouac meant the two books to be part of the same life. Together with books such as The Subterraneans and The Dharma Bums they make up the Duluoz legend which Kerouac compared to Proust’s In Search of Lost Time. “[...]except that my remembrances are written on the run instead of afterwards in a sick bed.”
