= Carel Moiseiwitsch =

British-Canadian artist (born 1941)

Carel Moiseiwitsch (born 1941) is a London-born artist based in Fraser Canyon and Vancouver, British Columbia, Canada. Her practice is based on activism and working outside of established academy and market spaces. This includes working in mediums and forms resistant to commodification, such as large-scale drawings and print, and an explicit focus on topics of social injustice and protest.

== Biography ==
Moiseiwitsch was born in London, England in 1941 during the Blitz and grew up in a girls' boarding school from the age of four. She began making comics at 13, inspired by the satirical cartoons and books of Ronald Searle. She went on to study at the St. Martin's School of Art during the late 1950s and early 1960s, before immigrating to Canada in 1968 and settling in Vancouver for the first time in 1972. She returned to Vancouver in 1984 and took a teaching position at Emily Carr University of Art and Design.

Moiseiwitsch has been involved in a variety of social, political, and environmental movements. In the 1970s, she became increasingly involved in the Vancouver feminist, anarchist, and punk movements as a single mother of three. In the vulnerable Vancouver community of the Downtown Eastside, she founded and ran a visual arts workshop for residents struggling with mental health and addiction. This workshop culminated in the Revelations exhibition at Interurban, where Portland Hotel Society residents contributed 41 artworks. In the 2000s, she became involved in anti-imperialist and anti-Zionist initiatives in the MENA region, including vocally and artistically criticizing Israel and its media coverage and travelling to Occupied Palestinian Territories in 2006 to assist Palestinian farmers during the olive harvest.

In June 2021, Moiseiwitsch's home, studio, and body of original work were destroyed in the devastating Lytton wildfire. In response, she filed a class-action lawsuit in 2021 against Canadian National and Canadian Pacific railways, alleging that the fire was caused by heat or sparks from railway operations on a day of record-breaking heat. The lawsuit was certified in 2025.

== Practice ==
Moiseiwitsch is well known for her print-based and graphic art practice, creating politically charged illustrations, prints, and alternative comics. This body of material stands as part of a long tradition of artists registering social protest in their work, including Francisco Goya, Théodore Géricault, Georg Grosz, Kathe Kollwitz, Leon Golub, Nancy Spero, Sue Coe, and the broadsheet works of Jose Guadalupe Posada. Moiseiwitsch works in affordable multiple formats and frequently takes inequality and violence in historical and contemporary social life as subject.

Moiseiwitsch's editorial illustrations have been featured in a variety of publications, including The Georgia Straight, The Village Voice, L.A. Weekly, The Economist, Middle East Report, Rip Off Comix, Wimmin's Comix, Raw, Real Stuff, Twisted Sisters, and Weirdo. One example of this graphic practice is the alternative comic O Canada Our Home and Native Land (1985), which highlights the history of Japanese-Canadian internment during and after World War II, detailing the violence and human rights violations of internment and the failure of the Canadian government to acknowledge this history or compensate Japanese-Canadians in the aftermath. Moiseiwitsch's graphic art works have also been shown in exhibition contexts, such as the lithograph Untitled (Four Black Jets) which was included in the BOMBHEAD exhibition at the Vancouver Art Gallery.

Moiseiwitsch employed print-based media and graphic art as a form of witnessing and documenting what she saw while visiting Occupied Palestinian Territories, which she exhibited in the 2003 Life in Occupied Palestine exhibition at grunt gallery. She and her partner Gordon Murray were sued by Canwest in 2007 for creating a parody of The Vancouver Sun that aimed to highlight anti-Palestinian biased reporting in Canwest's papers.

Moiseiwitsch also works in painting, employing an expressionistic style and touching on subjects of gender politics and environmental degradation. Her practice often pushes back against the dominance of conceptualism in the local and global art scene, with the goal of highlighting other functions of art such as communicating the artist's felt or emotional experience of the world.
