= Mariscal =

Mariscal is a surname. Notable people with the surname include:

- Alberto Mariscal (1926–2010), American-born Mexican actor and film director
- Ana Mariscal (1923–1995), Spanish film actress, director, screenwriter and film producer
- Ángel Mariscal (1904—1979), Spanish footballer
- Antonio Mariscal (1915–2010), Mexican lawyer and Olympic-level diver
- Ignacio Mariscal (1829–1910), Mexican liberal lawyer, politician, writer, and diplomat
- Javier Mariscal (born 1950), Spanish artist and designer
- Kary Mariscal (born 1976), Bolivian politician
- Marco Antonio Barba Mariscal (born 1970), Mexican politician
- Margarita Mariscal de Gante (born 1954), Spanish judge and politician
- Mark Mariscal (born 1979), American college and professional football
- Silvia Mariscal (born 1946), Mexican actress
- María José Mariscal (born 2005), Mexican actress
