= B. Kliban =

American cartoonist (1935–1990)

- Self portrait of B. Kliban
- Born: Bernard Kliban; January 1, 1935 Norwalk, Connecticut, U.S.
- Died: August 12, 1990 (aged 55) San Francisco, California, U.S.
- Areas: Cartoonist, Artist
- Spouses: M. K. Brown; Judith Kamman
- Children: 2
- Relatives: 1 (Grandson)

B. "Hap" Kliban (born Bernard Kliban; January 1, 1935 – August 12, 1990) was an American cartoonist.

== Early life and education ==
Born in Norwalk, Connecticut, Kliban studied at the Pratt Institute and Cooper Union but "flunked out." He spent time painting and traveling in Europe before moving to California, where he lived in the North Beach section of San Francisco. He did freelance advertising illustration, drawing ads, logos and annual reports. His first wife, Mary Kathleen Brown, was a noted cartoonist in her own right as M. K. Brown and chose many of the cartoons that appeared in his publications. It was while living in North Beach that Kliban began to draw cartoons for Playboy magazine. The income from Playboy provided financial security that enabled him in 1967 to move Brown and his daughter Kalia to the suburb of Fairfax, Marin County.

Kliban, who hated his given name of Bernard, went by the nickname "Hap" (for his birthday, "Happy New Year"). He eventually changed his legal name to the initial "B."

== Career ==
In 1962, Kliban became a Playboy cartoonist, contributing cartoons until his death. Michelle Urry, Playboy's cartoon editor, visiting his studio, reviewed his drawings, mostly cats. She thought they should be compiled into a book, introduced him to an agent, who found a publisher, resulting in the 1975 book Cat. This led to several other books of cartoons ending with Advanced Cartooning in 1993. Since Cat, his cartoons have adorned many products including stickers, calendars, mugs, and t-shirts.

The books that followed Cat consisted mostly of extremely bizarre cartoons that find their humor in their utter strangeness and unlikeliness. Many of these are cartoons that Kliban drew for Playboy. They often contained dysmorphic drawings of nude figures in extremely unlikely environments. Another frequent subject of satire was the type of wordless, step-by-step visual instruction manuals typically found with such things as office furniture. Kliban also had a recurring series of drawings called "Sheer Poetry," in which the page would be split into six panels, containing images of objects whose names, when spoken in the order presented, would form a rhyming, nonsensical verse.

Kliban drew the album cover for the David Bromberg Band's 1977 LP Reckless Abandon.

== Death and legacy ==
Kliban died at UCSF Medical Center aged 55 of an undisclosed heart condition; he had undergone heart surgery there two weeks previously. He was survived by his second wife, Judith Kamman Kliban (who married actor Bill Bixby shortly before Bixby's death in 1993); brother, Ken, of New York City; and two daughters: Kalia, from his first marriage with M. K. Brown; Sarah, from another relationship, and his grandson (Sarah's son) Benjamin Kliban.

Gary Larson, cartoonist of The Far Side comic strip, named Kliban as one of the inspirations for his work.

== Publications ==
=== Books ===
- Cat, 1975 (ISBN 0-911104-54-2 (pb), ISBN 0-911104-87-9 (hb))
- Never Eat Anything Bigger Than Your Head and Other Drawings, 1976 (ISBN 0-911104-67-4)
- Whack Your Porcupine and Other Drawings, 1977 (ISBN 0-911104-92-5)
- Tiny Footprints, 1978 (ISBN 0-89480-031-0)
- Playboy's Kliban, 1979 (ISBN 0-87223-547-5)
- Playboy's New Kliban, 1980 (ISBN 0-87223-626-9)
- Catcalendar Cats: The Complete Collection, 1981 (ISBN 0-89480-169-4)
- Two Guys Fooling Around with the Moon, 1982 (ISBN 0-89480-198-8)
- Luminous Animals and Other Drawings, 1983 (ISBN 0-14-006861-9)
- The Biggest Tongue in Tunisia and Other Drawings, 1986 (ISBN 0-14-007220-9)
- Advanced Cartooning, 1993 (ISBN 0-8362-1710-1)

=== Comic books ===
- Blink, A. (April 1977). "Doing It in the Park". Mother's Oats Comix. No. 3. Rip Off Press. p. 50. (Kliban credited under a pseudonym)

=== Posters ===
- March 5, 1967 – Benefit for Newstage and Straight Theater: Moby Grape, Big Brother and the Holding Company, Country Joe & the Fish, The Sparrows at Avalon Ballroom.
