= David Sandlin (artist) =

American artist (born 1956)

David Sandlin (born 1956) is a Northern Irish-born American artist.

== Biography ==
Sandlin was born in 1956, in Belfast, Northern Ireland, of a Northern Irish mother and American father, who had met and married in Belfast during the Second World War. The family immigrated to the United States in 1972, relocating in rural Alabama, 60 miles (97 km) from Birmingham.

After graduating from high school, Sandlin moved to Birmingham and worked his way through college at the University of Alabama at Birmingham. Both his childhood in a strife-torn Protestant neighborhood on the Shankill Road in Belfast and the abrupt move from a relatively cosmopolitan European city to an isolated Bible Belt town in north Alabama defined Sandlin's artistic outlook.

Since Sandlin began his professional career as an artist in the 1980s, visual narrative has been a core component of his work. In 1988, Sandlin published his post-modernist graphic novel Land Of 1000 Beers through the School of Visual Arts Press. In addition to painting and printmaking, since 1995 Sandlin has worked on a book series, A Sinner’s Progress, in various formats ranging from hand-silkscreened editions to an abecedarium published by Fantagraphics. Sandlin is also well known for his illustration work for The New Yorker, The New York Times, Harper’s Magazine, and other periodicals. His comics have been published in many anthologies, including Raw and The Best American Comics 2009, edited by Charles Burns. Sandlin lives and works in New York City.

Sandlin's drawings, prints, paintings, and installations are in private and public collections worldwide, and his limited-edition artist's books are in the collections of several prominent libraries, including those of the Museum of Modern Art, New York University, and Bard College. He has been the recipient of grants from the New York Foundation for the Arts, the Pollock-Krasner Foundation, the Swann Foundation, and the Penny McCall Foundation. In 2010, Sandlin was awarded a fellowship at the Cullman Center for Scholars and Writers at the New York Public Library. In 2014, he was awarded a Guggenheim Fellowship.

== Sources ==
- Alphabetical Ballad of Carnality published by Fantagraphics books.
