= Kary Mariscal =

Bolivian politician (born 1976)

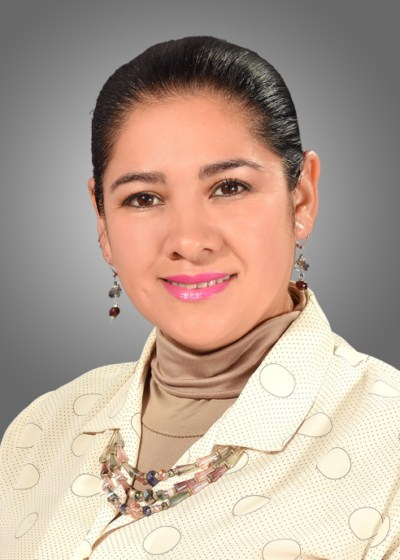
- Official portrait, 2017

Member of the Chamber of Deputies from Santa Cruz circumscription 54
- In office 18 January 2015 – 3 November 2020
- Substitute: Luis Fernando López
- Preceded by: María del Carmen España (Note: Redistribution; circumscription 58.)
- Succeeded by: María René Álvarez
- Constituency: Busch; Chiquitos; Sandoval; Velasco

Personal details
- Born: Kary Mariscal Guzmán; 9 March 1976 (age 50) San Ignacio de Velasco, Santa Cruz, Bolivia
- Party: Revolutionary Nationalist Movement
- Occupation: Educator; politician

Kary Mariscal Guzmán (born 9 March 1976) is a Bolivian schoolteacher and politician who served as a member of the Chamber of Deputies from Santa Cruz, representing circumscription 54 from 2015 to 2020. A member of the Revolutionary Nationalist Movement, Mariscal spent much of her life working in education, only entering the political field in 2010 with her election as a substitute member of her city's municipal council.

Elected to represent the Chiquitania region in the Chamber of Deputies, Mariscal was noted as the sole member of her party not to break away from the opposition Democratic Unity caucus upon taking office, a decision that resulted in her exclusion from important committee positions given to other members by the ruling Movement for Socialism. After a failed bid for reelection in 2019, Mariscal returned to her home San Ignacio de Velasco, where she launched an unsuccessful campaign for mayor in 2021.

== Early life and political career ==
Kary Mariscal was born on 9 March 1976 in San Ignacio de Velasco, a small city, capital of the Velasco Province, situated in the tropical Chiquitania region of eastern Santa Cruz. Mariscal spent much of her adult life as a housewife and primary school teacher, in addition to holding jobs as a cosmetologist and fashion stylist at various points in time.

A longtime adherent of the Revolutionary Nationalist Movement (MNR), Mariscal took her first steps into local politics in 2010, when she contested a seat on the San Ignacio Municipal Council, accompanying Lorgio Áñez as his substitute. The MNR, once dominant nationwide, had been severely debilitated by the tumultuous events of the 2003 gas conflict yet still retained a modicum of popular support in some eastern regions, specifically the Chiquitania, long a bastion of liberal conservative sentiment. Hence its landslide victory in San Ignacio, where the party, in alliance with Autonomy for Bolivia, won the mayoralty and five of the seven council seats, Mariscal and Áñez the holders of one of them.

== Chamber of Deputies ==
=== Election ===
Ahead of the 2014 general election, incumbent Luis Felipe Dorado resigned his seat representing Santa Cruz's circumscription 58 to seek reelection in a different district. His old constituency—slightly revised and assigned the number 54 during that year's redistribution process—encompassed much of the Chiquitania region, including the entirety of the Busch, Chiquitos, and Sandoval provinces, as well as a majority of Velasco.

In Dorado's place, the Democratic Unity (UD) coalition—an alliance composed of the National Unity Front, Social Democratic Movement, and a regional faction of the MNR led by Erik Morón—put forward Mariscal to contest the 54th circumscription. Her campaign faced efforts by the nationally ruling Movement for Socialism to pierce the region, for which it recruited Roberto Vaca as its nominee, who until then had built his own political career as a member of the same party as Mariscal's: the MNR. Her other opponent, Elizabeth Castedo, was also a member of the MNR, though of a rival faction aligned with the Christian Democratic Party.

Ultimately, Mariscal prevailed in a close contest, constituting one of the political opposition's only rural constituency victories. Even then, her win was by a substantial plurality, the lowest majority attained by any individual candidate in the Santa Cruz Department that election cycle. When factoring in the combined vote totals of her opponents and the many spoilt ballots, she won just 33.1 percent of the popular vote.

=== Tenure ===
Within two weeks of taking office, Morón's MNR broke off from UD, establishing an independent caucus in the Chamber of Deputies. Although most of the MNR's elected legislators—including Mariscal's own substitute, Luis Fernando López—quickly joined this new bloc, Mariscal notably abstained, stating that she was "not interested in being part of a group or caucus that sells itself to the [government] in exchange for [positions on committees]." That decision came with a stiff political cost; of the five MNR deputies, Mariscal was the lone member not selected to chair any commissions or committees.

During her tenure, Mariscal put forward a number of initiatives she pledged to pursue once elected. Along with projects to promote tourism and allocate funding for the construction of new hospitals in the Chiquitania, Mariscal also laid out more ambitious proposals, such as the formation of a new Ministry of Family. Although that never came to be, Mariscal's term did see the achievement of another aspiration; in 2018, the government approved a bill greenlighting the construction of a steel mill intended to process the iron ore extracted from Cerro Mutún. The mountain, situated in the Germán Busch Province—part of Mariscal's constituency—contains one of the largest deposits of iron ore in the world. Mariscal celebrated the project's approval as a significant boon for her constituents.

When the MNR presented its own ticket to contest the 2019 general election, Mariscal was put forward for reelection. (Note: Mariscal's brother, Roberto, also contested a seat in the Chamber of Deputies on the MNR's Santa Cruz party list.) Her campaign faced old and new challengers, first and foremost the Movement for Socialism, which Mariscal sought to pin the blame on for the devastating wildfires affecting her constituency. Ultimately, the ruling party again failed to win the Chiquitania, though neither did Mariscal, whose bid for reelection was defeated by María René Álvarez of Civic Community. Though the 2019 results were later annulled, Mariscal remained absent from the campaign in the rerun 2020 general election. Instead, she sought to make a comeback in local politics, launching a bid for the mayoralty of the San Ignacio de Velasco Municipality on behalf of the MNR. In a competitive field of six candidates, Mariscal was less than successful; she exited in last place on election day, garnering less than 400 votes in her favor.

=== Commission assignments ===
- Planning, Economic Policy, and Finance Commission
  - Planning and Public Investment Committee (2016–2017, 2018–2019)
- Plural Economy, Production, and Industry Commission
  - Industry, Commerce, Transport, and Tourism Committee (2015–2016)
- Human Rights Commission
  - Gender Rights Committee (Secretary: 2019–2020)
- Amazon Region, Land, Territory, Water, Natural Resources, and Environment Commission
  - Natural and Hydric Resources and Water Committee (2017–2018)

== Electoral history ==
Electoral history of Kary Mariscal
Year	Office	Party	Alliance	Votes			Result	Ref.
Year	Office	Party	Alliance	Total	%	P.	Result	Ref.
2010	Sub. Councillor	Revolutionary Nationalist Movement	Broad Front	7,088	60.84%	1st	Won	(Note: Presented on an electoral list. The data shown represents the share of the vote the entire party/alliance received in that constituency.)
2014	Deputy	Revolutionary Nationalist Movement	Democratic Unity	23,209	42.93%	1st	Won	
2019	Deputy	Revolutionary Nationalist Movement		3,667	5.35%	4th	Annulled	
2021	Mayor	Revolutionary Nationalist Movement	Christian Democratic	364	1.41%	6th	Lost	
Source: Plurinational Electoral Organ | Electoral Atlas

Chamber of Deputies of Bolivia
Preceded by María del Carmen España	Member of the Chamber of Deputies from Santa Cruz circumscription 54; 2015–2020	Succeeded by María René Álvarez
