= Richard Sala =

American cartoonist (1954–2020)

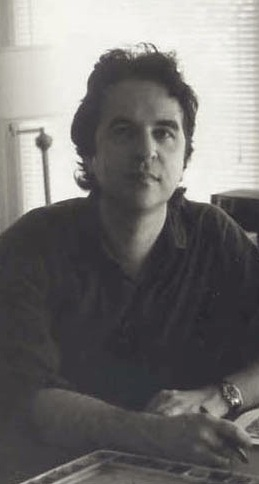
- Born: June 2, 1954 Oakland, California, U.S.
- Died: May 7, 2020 (aged 65) Oakland, California, U.S.
- Area: Cartoonist
- Notable works: Invisible Hands; The Chuckling Whatsit; Evil Eye

Richard Sala (June 2, 1954 – May 7, 2020) was an American cartoonist, illustrator, and comic book creator with a unique expressionistic style whose books often combined elements of mystery, horror and whimsy.

== Biography ==
Richard Sala was born in Oakland, California in 1954. He spent his childhood in West Chicago, Illinois, and his teenage years in Scottsdale, Arizona. In interviews, Sala mentioned the influence of his childhood years on his work, particularly his visits to museums and antique shops. He stated that his love of reading and his interest in comic books and horror films helped him deal with real-life fears. He attended college as an art major, finally earning a Master of Fine Arts degree in painting from Mills College. He then worked as a freelance illustrator, something he had begun doing while in college, and a cartoonist, publishing his first comic book, Night Drive, in 1984.

More of a reflection of his art school education than a typical comic book, Night Drive nevertheless ended up opening doors for Sala that would eventually lead to his rediscovering and embracing his childhood love of comics and monsters. The book came to the attention of several individuals who contacted Sala to request work. These included Art Spiegelman, Monte Beauchamp and Colossal Pictures and resulted in his appearances in two highly regarded comic anthologies – Spiegelman's RAW and Beauchamp's BLAB!. Colossal Pictures hired Sala to animate one of the stories from Night Drive called "Invisible Hands." This was eventually expanded by Sala and director Denis Morella into a 12-minute story about a psychic detective, a hooded criminal, taxidermy, a costume party, and a secret society of one-handed killers, all done in Sala's usual tongue-in-cheek style. Divided into two-minute chapters so it could be shown as a serial, Invisible Hands debuted on the first season of MTV's Liquid Television show, which also featured the television debuts of Beavis and Butthead and Æon Flux.

Two of his books, The Chuckling Whatsit and Mad Night, began as serials. They are epic thrillers with labyrinthine plots and black humor. The Chuckling Whatsit first appeared in the anthology Zero Zero. Mad Night, which features the girl detective Judy Drood, was initially serialized in Sala's 12-issue comic book series Evil Eye, published by Fantagraphics Books. Evil Eye also introduced Peculia, a mysterious black-haired waif whose fairy tale-inspired adventures include encounters with murderous children, necrophiles, cat-women, and zombies. Evil Eye ran for twelve issues, between 1998 and 2001.

Sala worked on projects with Lemony Snicket, Steve Niles, and The Residents, and illustrated Doctor Sax and The Great World Snake, a script written in the 1960s by Jack Kerouac, which, like Sala's own work, makes use of pulp genre conventions such as vampires and shadowy avengers.

In 2014, Sala began writing and drawing a webcomic entitled Super-Enigmatix, which follows the investigation into a sinister super-criminal. In 2016, Sala began a second webcomic, The Bloody Cardinal, also about a mystery-shrouded super-criminal. The Bloody Cardinal was published in print form by Fantagraphics in 2017.

== Death ==
Sala died on May 7, 2020, at the age of 65 of a heart attack.

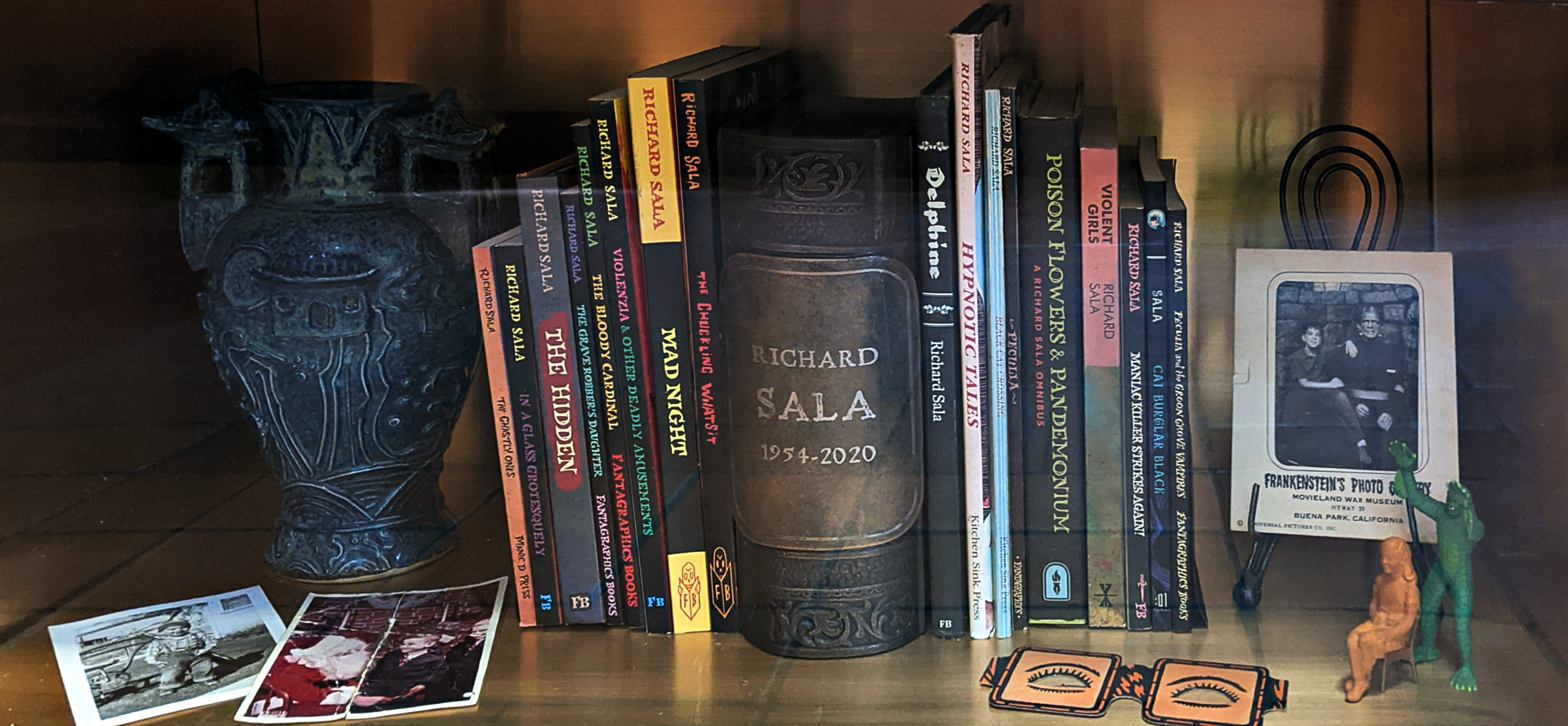
Columbarium niche of Richard Sala at the Chapel of the Chimes (Oakland, California).

== Bibliography ==
- Poison Flowers and Pandemonium (Fantagraphics Books, 2021)
- Carlotta Havoc versus Everybody (unfinished webcomic, 2020)
- The Bloody Cardinal (Fantagraphics Books, 2017)
- Violenzia and Other Deadly Amusements (Fantagraphics Books, 2015)
- In a Glass Grotesquely (Fantagraphics Books, 2014)
- Violenzia (Fantagraphics Books, 2013)
- The Hidden (Fantagraphics Books, 2011)
- Cat Burglar Black (First Second Books, 2009)
- Delphine (4 issues, Fantagraphics Books, 2006–2009; collected by Fantagraphics in 2012)
- The Grave Robber's Daughter (Fantagraphics Books, 2006)
- Dracula (2005) (Volume 3 of IDW's Little Book of Horror Series, in collaboration with Steve Niles)
- Peculia and the Groon Grove Vampires (Fantagraphics Books, 2005)
- Mad Night (Fantagraphics Books, 2005)
- Maniac Killer Strikes Again! Delirious, Mysterious Stories (Fantagraphics Books, 2003)
- Peculia (Fantagraphics Books, 2002)
- Evil Eye (12 issues, Fantagraphics Books, June 1998–June 2004)
- The Chuckling Whatsit (Fantagraphics Books, 1997)
- The Ghastly Ones and Other Fiendish Frolics (Manic D Press, Inc., 1995)
- Black Cat Crossing (Kitchen Sink Press, 1993)
- Thirteen O'Clock (Dark Horse Comics, 1992)
- Hypnotic Tales (Kitchen Sink Press, 1992)
- Night Drive (self-published, 1984)
