= Doctor Sax =

1959 novel by American author Jack Kerouac

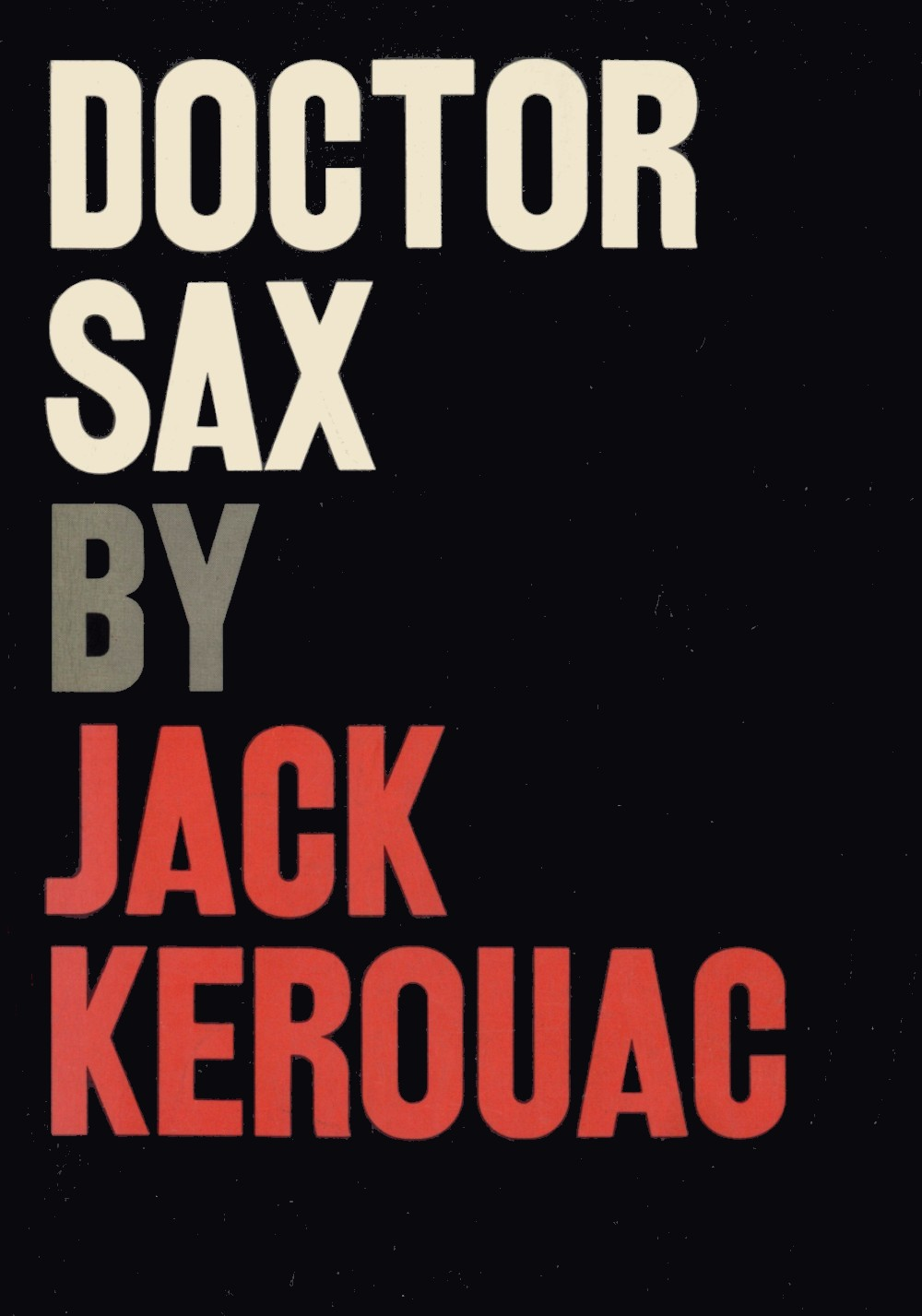
- First-edition cover
- Author: Jack Kerouac
- Language: English
- Publisher: Grove Press
- Publication date: 1959
- Publication place: United States
- Media type: Print (hardback and paperback)
- Pages: Approx. 245 pages
- ISBN: 0-8021-3049-6
- OCLC: 16833360
- Dewey Decimal: 813/.54 19
- LC Class: PS3521.E735 D63 1987
- Preceded by: The Dharma Bums (1958)
- Followed by: Maggie Cassidy (1959)

Doctor Sax (Doctor Sax: Faust Part Three) is a novel by Jack Kerouac published in 1959. Kerouac wrote it in 1952 while living with William S. Burroughs in Mexico City. The book was released simultaneously as a paperback and a hardback edition. As Evergreen book E-160. Also a specially bound and signed edition of 26 copies lettered A through Z and 4 copies "hors commerce" numbered 1 through 4 were released.

== Composition ==
The novel was written quickly in the improvisatory style Kerouac called "spontaneous prose." In a letter to Allen Ginsberg dated May 18, 1952, Kerouac wrote, "I'll simply blow [improvise like a jazz musician] on the vision of the Shadow in my 13th and 14th years on Sarah Ave. Lowell, culminated by the myth itself as I dreamt it in Fall 1948 . . . angles of my hoop-rolling boyhood as seen from the shroud." In a letter to Ginsberg dated November 8 of the same year, Kerouac admits "Doctor Sax was written high on tea [marijuana] without pausing to think, sometimes Bill [Burroughs] would come in the room and so the chapter ended there..." As part of his writing process Kerouac would also close his eyes in order to picture what he was writing about more vividly. He would also douse himself in water in order to supposedly: "Capture the spark of the shock, a little point I broaden with unnameable mental effort."

== Plot summary ==
The novel begins with Jackie Duluoz, based on Kerouac himself, relating a dream in which he finds himself in Lowell, Massachusetts, his childhood home town. Prompted by this dream, he recollects the story of his childhood of warm browns and sepia tones, along with his shrouded childhood fantasies, which have become inextricable from the memories.

The fantasies pertain to a castle in Lowell atop a muted green hill that Jackie calls Snake Hill. Underneath the misty grey castle, the Great World Snake sleeps. Various vampires, monsters, gnomes, werewolves, and dark magicians from all over the world gather to the mansion with the intention of awakening the Snake so that it will devour the entire world (although a small minority of them, derisively called "Dovists," believe that the Snake is merely "a husk of doves," and when it awakens it will burst open, releasing thousands of lace white doves. This myth is also present in a story told by Kerouac's character, Sal Paradise, in On the Road).

The eponymous Doctor Sax, also part of Jackie's fantasy world, is a dark but ultimately friendly figure with a shrouded black cape, an inky black slouch hat, a haunting laugh, and a "disease of the night" called Visagus Nightsoil that causes his skin to turn mossy green at night. Sax, who also came to Lowell because of the Great World Snake, lives in the forest in the neighboring town of Dracut, where he conducts various alchemical experiments, attempting to concoct a potion to destroy the Snake when it awakens.

When the Snake is finally awakened, Doctor Sax uses his potion on the Snake, but the potion fails to do any damage. Sax, defeated, discards his shadowy black costume and watches the events unfold as an ordinary man. As the Snake prepares to destroy the world, all seems lost until an enormous night colored bird, an ancient counterpart of the Snake, suddenly appears. Seizing the Snake in its beak, the bird flies upward into the heartbreakingly blue sky until it vanishes from view, leading the amazed Sax to muse, "I'll be damned, the universe disposes of its own evil!"

== Character key ==
Kerouac often based his fictional characters on friends and family.

"Because of the objections of my early publishers I was not allowed to use the same personae names in each work."

Real-life person	Character name
Leo Kerouac	Emil "Pop" Duluoz
Gabrielle Kerouac	Ange
Gerard Kerouac	Gerard Duluoz
Caroline Kerouac	Catherine "Nin" Duluoz
George "G.J." Apostolos	Rigopoulos
Henry "Scotty" Beaulieu	Paul "Scotty" Boldieu
Freddie Bertrand	Vinny Bergerac
"Happy" Bertrand	Lucky Bergerac
Leona Bertrand	Charlie Bergerac
Billy Chandler	Dickie Hampshire
Duke Chiungos	Bruno Gringas
Omer X. Noel	Ali Zaza
Roland Salvas	Albert "Lousy" Lauzon

== Screenplay adaptation ==

Kerouac also wrote a screenplay adaptation of the novel entitled Doctor Sax and the Great World Snake. It was never filmed, but in 1998, Kerouac's nephew Jim Sampas discovered the text in Kerouac's archives. He proceeded to produce the piece in audio form, much like a radio drama, and release it in 2003 from his independent record label, Gallery Six (named for the site of the famous Six Gallery reading), in a partnership with Mitch Winston's record label, Kid Lightning Enterprises. The release consisted of two CDs and a book containing the screenplay with illustrations by Richard Sala.

=== Voice acting ===
Narration: Robert Creeley
Jackie Duluoz, Voice, Count Condu, Boaz, Butcher, Man 1, Parakeet, Man 2 : Jim Carroll
Doctor Sax : Robert Hunter
Lousy: Ellis Paul
Vamp: Kate Pierson
The Wizard: Lawrence Ferlinghetti
Dicky: Bill Janovitz
Pa: Jim Eppard
Ma, Mother, Woman: Kristina Wacome
Gene: Jim Sampas
GJ: John Keegan
Blanche, Nin: Anne Emerick
Wizard's Wife, Woman 2: Maggie Estep

=== Score ===
John Medeski

== In other media ==
The character Doctor Sax appeared in The League of Extraordinary Gentlemen: Black Dossier by Alan Moore in a story written by Sal Paradise (from Kerouac's On the Road). He is mentioned as being the grandson of The Devil Doctor (because of the Doctor's creator, Sax Rohmer) and fights against Mina Murray, Allan Quatermain, Paradise and Dean Moriarty (who is the grandson of Manchu's rival and Sherlock Holmes' nemesis Professor Moriarty).
