= Max Andersson (cartoonist) =

Swedish comic creator and film maker (born 1962)

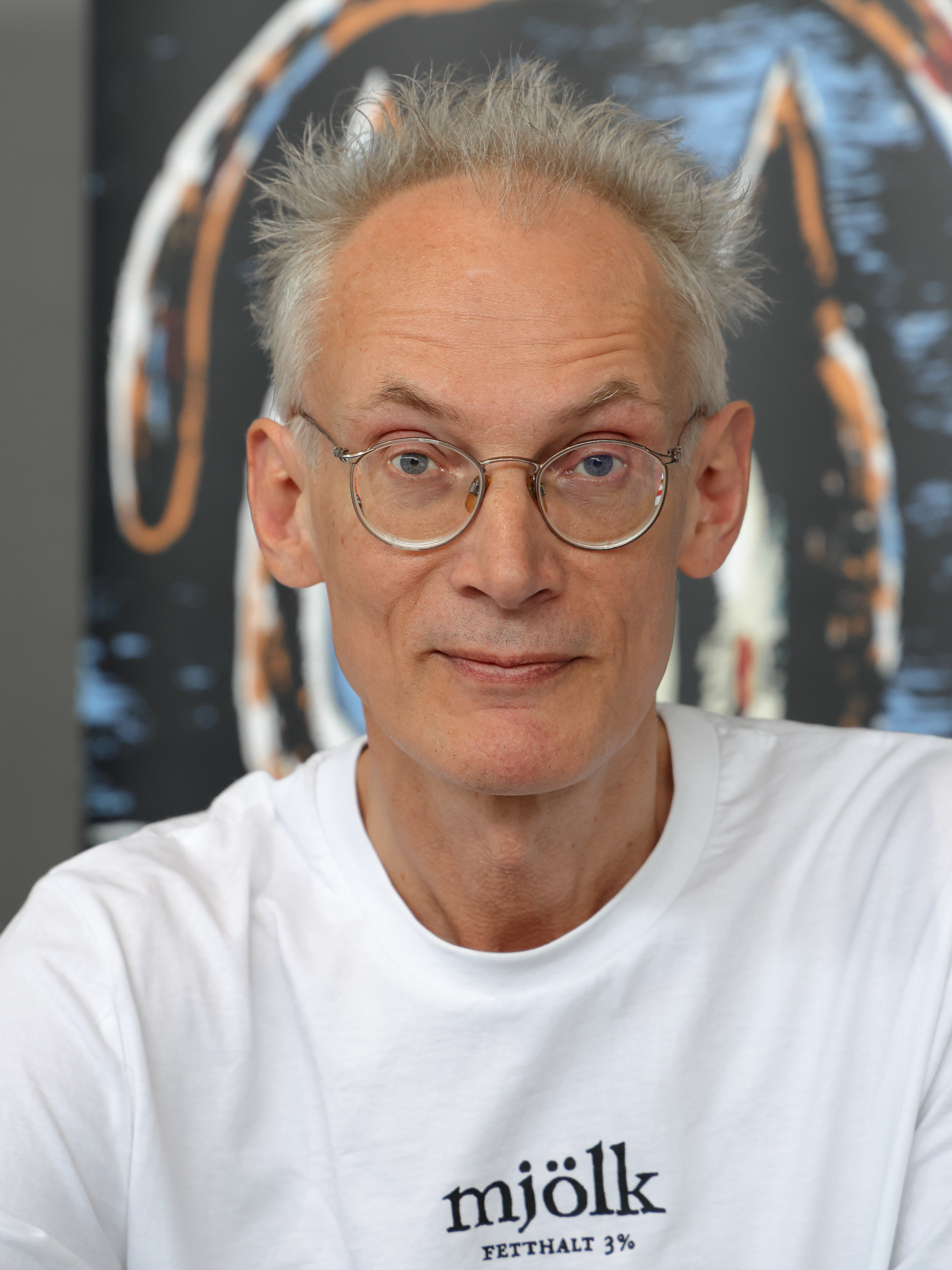
- Max Andersson, 2026
- Born: 29 July 1962 (age 64) Karesuando, Sweden
- Area: Cartoonist
- Notable works: Pixy, Death & Candy

Max Andersson (born 1962) is a Swedish comic creator and filmmaker, mostly doing "underground style" and "artistic" comics. His comics have mainly been published in Swedish albums, and in the Swedish art magazine Galago.

With the publication of his graphic novel Pixy by Fantagraphics Books in 1993, Andersson became the first modern Swedish artist to have a comic album published in the United States. In the '90s he was a frequent contributor to the comics anthology Zero Zero. He is also the creator of the comic book Death & Candy.

The Greek anarchopunk band The No Sin named their albums "Drug Called Future" (2006) and "Some Key According to Death and Candy" (2009) in honor of Max Andersson's comics.
