= Ever Meulen =

Belgian illustrator and cartoonist

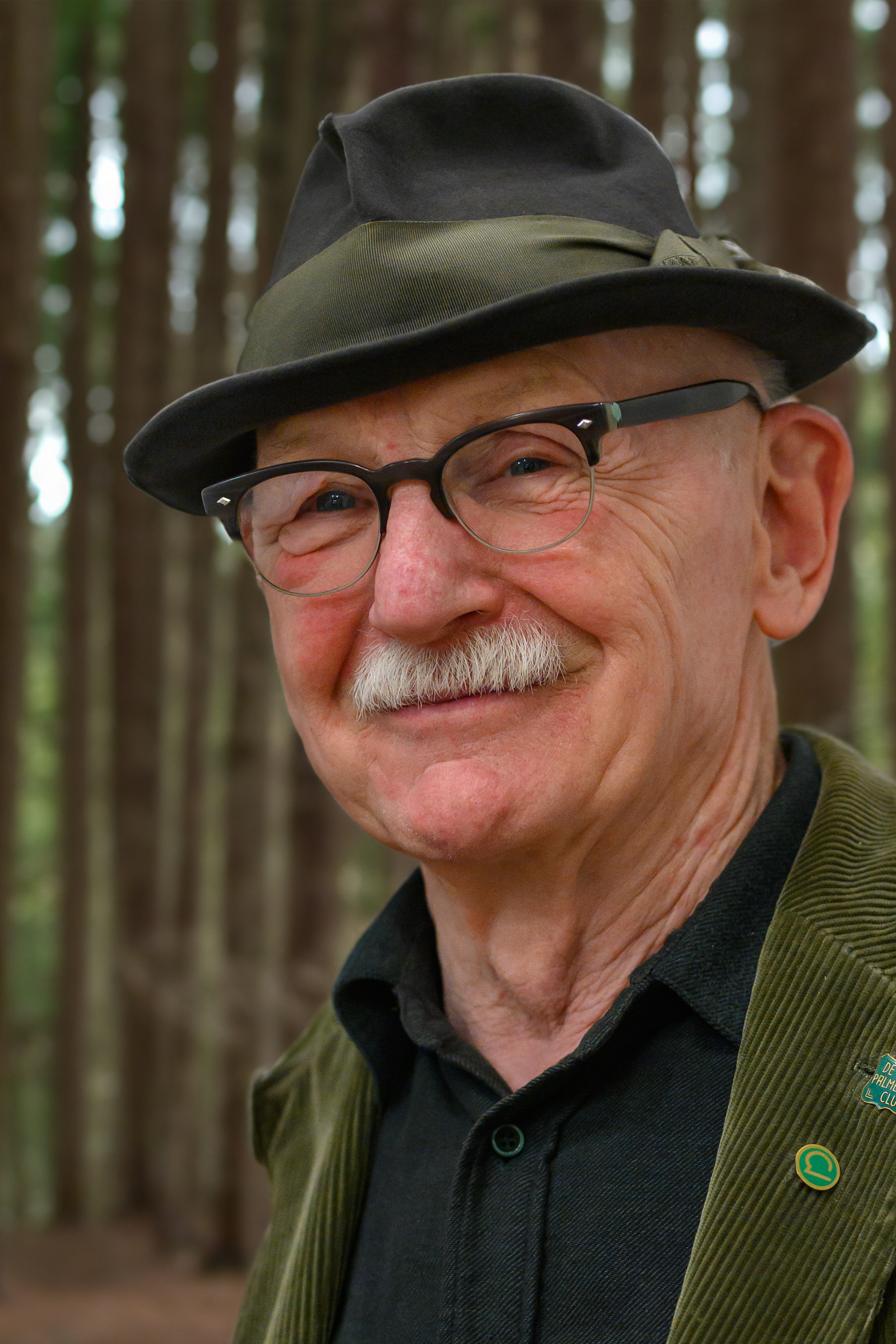
- Vermeulen in 2023
- Born: Eddy Vermeulen; 12 February 1946 (age 80); Kuurne, Belgium
- Style: Ligne claire

Ever Meulen (born Eddy Vermeulen; 12 February 1946) is a Belgian illustrator, caricaturist and comic strip artist. His pseudonym is based on his name E. Vermeulen.

== Biography ==
Vermeulen waa born on 12 February 1946 in Kuurne, Belgium. He studied graphic arts at the Sint-Lucas School of Architecture in Ghent and Brussels. He debuted in 1970, working for the magazine Humo, where he drew both comics ("Balthazar de Groene Steenvreter" ("Balthasar the Green Stone Eater") and "Piet Peuk" ("Pete Stub")), as well as cover illustrations, caricatures and illustrations to articles. When Humo published books or CDs, Meulen often provided the cover illustration. In 1983 Humo won a Gold Award for a magazine cover created by Meulen about the visit of pope John-Paul II to Poland, which featured a photograph of the pope sporting Lech Wałęsa's moustache.

One of Ever Meulen’s The New Yorker covers (1999)

Meulen also had success abroad. In the Netherlands his work was published in the underground comix magazine Tante Leny presenteert!, as well as Vrij Nederland and OOR. In France, he published in Libération and Télé-Moustique. During the 1980s, his work appeared in Raw and New Yorker. One of his covers for RAW won the Certificate of Design Excellence. His work has been exhibited in London, Liverpool, Angoulême, New York City, Geneva, Amsterdam, Lyon and Turku, Finland. Meulen's book Verve (2006), collecting his most important graphic work from 1988 to 2005, has a foreword by Art Spiegelman. Other artists who praised his work were Saul Steinberg and Andy Warhol.

Meulen also designed the annual Gouden Uil award and made album covers for the Belgian bands The Employees, Telex and singer Raymond van het Groenewoud.

Meulen is known for his love of stylish cars and motorcycles, as well as old Belgian comics from Tintin and Spirou, two elements he frequently pays homage to in his work. He owns an Oldsmobile. His early work is elegant and extravagant, while from 1979 his style became "sharper and hookier".

He taught at Sint-Lucas in Ghent, where one of his students was Jeroom.

In 2013 Meulen received the Henry Van de Velde Award for his entire career.

== See also ==
- 2024 Kuurne–Brussels–Kuurne
