= Carol Tyler =

American cartoonist

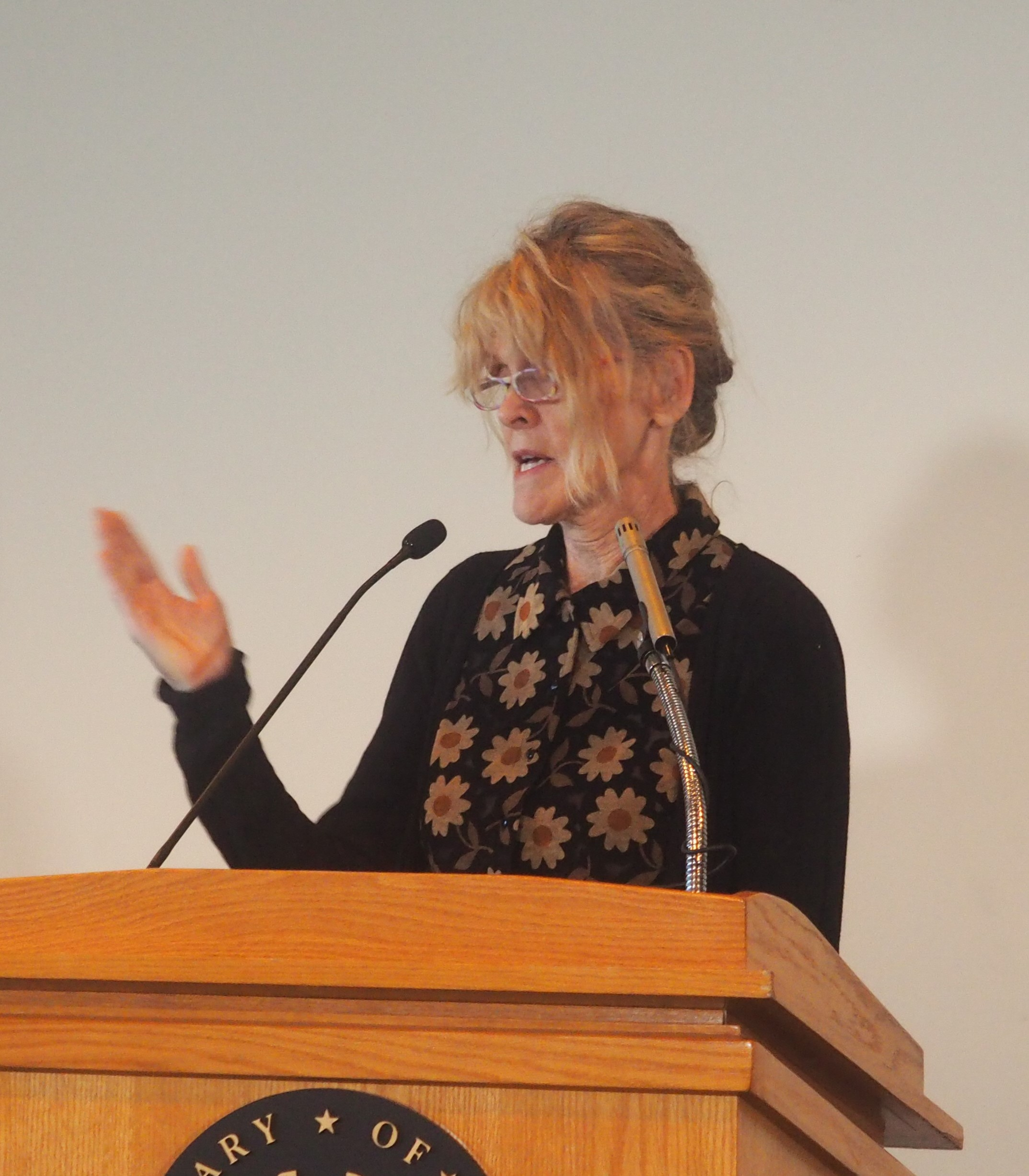
- Born: November 20, 1951 (age 75) Chicago, Illinois, U.S.
- Area: Cartoonist
- Pseudonym: C. Tyler
- Notable works: The Ephemerata, Soldier's Heart, Fab4 Mania, Late Bloomer
- Awards: Master Cartoonist Award, Cartoon Crossroads Columbus Gold Medal Excellence Award, Society of Illustrators Inkpot Award, Comicon international Cartoonist Studio Prize, Slate.com Nemo Award, Toonseum Pittsburgh PA Dori Seda Memorial Award for Best New Female Cartoonist, 1988

Carol Tyler (born November 20, 1951) is an autobiographical comics pioneer and 2026 Will Eisner Hall of Fame inductee. Her beautifully written and drawn stories have been recognized for decades with multiple nominations and awards, including the Gold Medal of Excellence from the Society of Illustrators, the Cartoonist Studio Prize, an Inkpot award from Comic-Con, the Ohio Arts Council Excellence Award, the Master Cartoonist award at the 2016 Cartoon Crossroads Columbus Festival at the Billy Ireland Cartoon Library & Museum.

In 2026, Carol Tyler was a Judge's Choice inductee into the Will Eisner Hall of Fame.

== Biography ==
Born and raised in Chicago, Illinois, she attended Catholic schools, K -12, and Middle Tennessee State University where she achieved a Bachelor of Fine Arts degree. Tyler became interested in the underground comics movement while pursuing a master's degree in painting at Syracuse University in the early 1980s. This interest brought her to the underground comics hotbed of San Francisco.

Her first comics publication was the 1987 story "Uncovered Property", in Weirdo. Tyler's short slice-of-life stories and her distinctive artwork brought her critical attention as one of a growing number of female artists shaping the direction of underground/alternative comics in North America in the 1980s; she appeared in the influential feminist anthologies Wimmen's Comix and Twisted Sisters. Her first solo book, The Job Thing, was published in 1993. She produced short comics for publications including LA Weekly, Pulse (Tower Records), Strip AIDS, Heck, and Zero Zero.

Tyler also performed live comedy with the Rick & Ruby Patio Show at LA's The Comedy Store, the Great American Music Hall in San Francisco, and the Clunie Center in Sacramento.

Her second solo work, Late Bloomer, was published by Fantagraphics in 2005. It's a career highlight collection including both previously published and new material. In his foreword, Robert Crumb says, "She's tops in my book. One of the best artists alive and working in the comics medium. Her work has the extremely rare quality of authentic HEART. Hers are the only comics that ever brought me to the verge of tears."

Her latest work is the two part "Ephemerata" series. "The Ephemerata: Shaping the Exquisite Nature of Grief" (Fantagraphics, 2025) and the upcoming "Verdante: The Ephemerata Goes Home." (Fantagraphics, 2028) "Fab4 Mania: A Beatles Obsession and the Concert of a Lifetime" is about the author's discovering and loving the Beatles when she was 13. The book is a slice-of-life, and leads up to her seeing them perform live at Chicago's Comiskey Park in 1965. (Fantagraphics, 2018). Before that, in 2015, the You'll Never Know trilogy was combined in to one volume called "Soldier's Heart: The Campaign to Understand My WWII Veteran Father, A Daughter's Memoir." These books "Soldier's Heart/and the 3 You'll Never Knows" are about her search for the truth about what happened to her father during World War II, and her attempt to understand the damage his war experiences had on her life and future relationships. The New York Times called it " a vivid, affecting, eccentrically stylish frame built around a terrible silence". Book One: A Good & Decent Man was released in May 2009. Book Two: Collateral Damage was released in July 2010. The final installment of the trilogy, Book Three: Soldier's Heart, was released in October 2012.

Tyler taught a comics class at the University of Cincinnati College of Design, Architecture, Art, and Planning from 2006 - 2019. Her primary focus was teaching students the methods and techniques of comic creation. In teaching the history of comics "Tyler can pull out almost the entire history of comics in this country, everything from 1930s classics to 1950s comic magazines teaching aspects of African American history (regarding Harriet Tubman and Crispus Attucks) to an original of the first issue of the iconoclastic Mad Magazine." She has also brought her current book theme, military service, into the classroom.

Another cartooning endeavor was a series of one-page stories called "Tomatoes" for Cincinnati magazine. Based upon her experiences of growing tomatoes and friendships in the heart of the city, "Tomatoes" appears monthly on the publication's inside back page.

Tyler was a 2016 Civitella Ranieri residency fellow. She is also a Residency artist through the Arts Learning Program with the Ohio Arts Council.

In 2016, Tyler spoke at the Billy Ireland Cartoon Art Museum on "... the unique challenges of autobiographical storytelling set in real time with real characters." She also spoke at The Society of Illustrators.

DAAP Galleries staged a major one-woman exhibit of Tyler's work which included "...written entries of her ascent into illustration, accompanied by artworks and sketches from throughout her career," and "...eclectic 3-D creations...A flashing, multicolored light inside of a star rotates along one wall. An interactive piece called the "Ego-Meter" asks viewers to pull a string that raises a wooden face up the meter. A creepy baby doll spins around on a stick...an excellent job of showcasing an inspirational artist and professor at UC".

In 2017 she gave a talk about her process of creating Soldier's Heart at the Library of Congress, titled "Comics to a 'T".

In 2020, Carol Tyler's work was chosen to be a part of the Society of Illustrators Museum exhibit "Women in Comics: Looking Forward, Looking Back".

From November 5–20, 2021, "Shaping Grief: Carol Tyler's Mourning Mind" an interactive art experience was featured at the DSGN Collective in Cincinnati, Ohio. It was composed of comics, repurposed objects, murals, mobiles, and a giant mourning bonnet which served as a gateway through which people would walk to observe the exhibit. The artwork and bonnet are part of her upcoming book "The Ephemerata: Shaping the Exquisite Nature of My Grief".

Carol Tyler and her late husband Justin Green are the subject of the documentary film Married to Comics, which premiered in 2023 at the Small Press Expo event feature at the AFI Silver Theater and Culture Center.

In 2025, the Billy Ireland Cartoon Library and Museum hosted a solo retrospective highlighting Carol's decades-long achievements in comics with a show called "Write It Down, Draw It Out: The Comics Art of Carol Tyler."

== Personal life ==
Tyler currently lives in Cincinnati. She has been there with the cartoonist Justin Green since 1997 until his death (1945–2022). Before that, they were in Sacramento. They met and lived in San Francisco in the early 1980s, married in October 1984, and have a child, Julia Green. Her brothers are Olympic bobsledders Joe Tyler (USA #1 1980) and Jim Tyler (USA #1 1984).

== Awards ==
In 2016, Carol Tyler received the Cartoonist Studio Prize from the Slate Book Review. With fellow recipient Sergio Aragones, she accepted the Master Cartoonist Award from Cartoon Crossroads Columbus.

You'll Never Know, Book I: A Good & Decent Man, Book II: Collateral Damage, and Book III: Soldier's Heart have been nominated for many awards in the comics industry, including eleven Eisner Award nominations for Best writer/artist non-fiction, Best graphic album, Best Lettering and Best Painter/Multimedia Artist, 2 Harvey Awards, and 2 Ignatz Awards. The series was named as a finalist for the 2011 Los Angeles Times Book Prize. In 2016, "A Soldier's Heart" brought Tyler another nomination for an LA Times Book Prize. It also received an Ohio Arts Council Excellence Award.

In 2010, it was named one of "The Most Memorable Comics & Graphic Novels of 2010" by NPR's Glen Weldon. It ranked #5 on Rob Clough's Top 50 Books of 2010 at High-Low. It also made the "Best of 2010" lists at Comic Book Resources, Robot 6, and Politics and Prose. Best American Comics listed it as a "notable comic" in 2011.

Tyler's piece "The Hannah Story", published in Drawn & Quarterly, was nominated for a 1995 Eisner Award and is on the Fantagraphics list of Top 100 Comics of the Twentieth Century.

In 1988, Tyler was awarded the inaugural Dori Seda Memorial Award for Best New Female Cartoonist from Last Gasp.

The Ephemerata: Shaping the Exquisite Nature of Grief was a finalist for the 2025 Los Angeles Times Book Prize for Graphic Novel/Comics.

The Ephemerata was also nominated for the Eisner Award for Best Graphic Memoir, and the Ringo Award for Best Original Graphic Novel.

In 2026, Carol Tyler was selected for inclusion in the Eisner Hall of Fame.

== Bibliography ==
=== Graphic novels ===
- The Ephemerata: Shaping the Exquisite Nature of Grief. Fantagraphics, 2025. ISBN 979-8-8750-0143-7
- Fab4 Mania: A Beatles Obsession and the Concert of a Lifetime. Fantagraphics, 2018. ISBN 978-1-68396-061-4
- Soldier's Heart: The Campaign to Understand My WWII Veteran Father. Fantagraphics, 2015. ISBN 978-1-60699-896-0
- You'll Never Know: Book III: "Soldier's Heart". Fantagraphics, 2012. ISBN 978-1-60699-548-8
- You'll Never Know: Book II: "Collateral Damage". Fantagraphics, 2010. ISBN 978-1-60699-418-4
- You'll Never Know: Book I: "A Good and Decent Man". Fantagraphics, 2009. ISBN 978-1-60699-144-2
- Late Bloomer. Fantagraphics Books, 2005. ISBN 1-56097-664-0
- The Job Thing. Fantagraphics Books, 1993. ISBN 1-56097-111-8
- The Ephemerata. Seattle: Fantagraphics Books, Inc. 2025-09-09. ISBN 979-8-8750-0143-7.

=== Comics and magazines ===
- Weirdo
- Wimmen's Comix
- Street Music
- Zero Zero
- Mineshaft Magazine
- Prime Cuts
- LA Weekly
- Drawn & Quarterly
- Tower Records' Pulse!
