= Ernie Pook's Comeek =

Comic by Lynda Barry

Ernie Pook's Comeek is an American underground comic/alternative comic by Lynda Barry.

It was first published in 1979, without Barry's knowledge, by Matt Groening and John Keister in their respective college newspapers. In the very beginning, the comic chronicled the everyday life of a young boy, Ernie Pook. However, within a period of about a year, the comic's focus shifted to a slightly awkward young girl named Maybonne Mullen and her largely dysfunctional family, who live in a trailer park in the Pacific Northwest sometime in the early 1970s. Most often featured was Maybonne's passively-aggressive sour grandmother, whom Maybonne and her siblings lived with, and Maybonne's younger siblings: somewhat naive and easily-led Freddie, and cheerful, energetic and irrepressible Marlys. Cousins Arna and Arnold also lived with the Mullens off-and-on. Ernie Pook himself faded from the strip very shortly after the Mullen family took center stage -- nevertheless, the strip retained the name "Ernie Pook's Comeek" for its entire 29-year run.

While Barry has stated the comic wasn't autobiographical, it was loosely based on her own childhood years. It ran in over 70 alternative newspapers, such as the Chicago Reader.

It was discontinued in 2008. Drawn & Quarterly reissued a collection called The Greatest of Marlys in 2016 and is continuing to reissue collections.
