= Comic jam =

Collaborative creative process by comics artists

A comic jam is a creative process where one or more comics artists collaborates on drawing or painting one single comic. Often the process is that one artist creates the first page, and then another artist creates the second, and a third does the next, and so on. There is no script that the artists work from, and the content of the comics is improvised. Any given artist working on a comic jam makes a page based solely on what happened on the previous page. Variations include each artist contributing a single panel, or set of two or three panels, and then passing it on to the next participant. The cartoonists of the seminal underground anthology Zap Comix were known for contributing a jam comic to each issue of Zap from around issue #3 onward.

== Notable examples ==
- Jam-Jar! (San Francisco Comic Book Company, 1972) — Larry Bigman, Scott Shaw, David Gibson, John Pound, Roger Freedman, Phil Yeh
- Zam (Zap Jam) (Print Mint, 1974) — a whole comic featuring the seven-member Zap Comix collective: Gilbert Shelton, Robert Crumb, Spain Rodriguez, S. Clay Wilson, Victor Moscoso, Rick Griffin, & Robert Williams
- The Spirit #30 (Kitchen Sink, July 1981) — script and a few penciled pages by Will Eisner, with contributions from 50 artists, including Fred Hembeck, Trina Robbins, Steve Leialoha, Frank Miller, Harvey Kurtzman, Howard Cruse, Brian Bolland, Bill Sienkiewicz, John Byrne, and Richard Corben
- Heroes for Hope (Marvel Comics, 1985)
- Heroes Against Hunger (DC Comics, 1986)
- Sisterson (London, c. 1990)
- The Narrative Corpse (Gates of Heck, 1995)

== See also ==
- Exquisite corpse
- Reanimated collaboration
