= Ace Backwords =

American cartoonist (born 1956)

- Born: September 12, 1956 (age 70) New Jersey
- Areas: Cartoonist, Writer, Penciller

Peter Labriola (born September 12, 1956), better known by the pen name Ace Backwords, is an American author and a former underground cartoonist based in Berkeley, California. He sleeps rough on the streets of Berkeley, but is not indigent.

== Information ==
Backwords, born Peter Labriola, published Twisted Image, a punk rock tabloid, from 1982 to 1984 featuring interviews with Johnny Rotten, Jello Biafra, Henry Rollins, Charles Bukowski, R. Crumb, and Charles Schulz. The name was also used for a comic strip he created and distributed to independent publications. From 1989 to 2004, Backwords and B. N. Duncan produced the Telegraph Avenue Calendar, which featured selected people in Berkeley that were homeless. A collection of his comics, also entitled Twisted Image, was published by Loompanics in 1991. In 1993, he drew original comic strips for John Hoffman's book The Art and Science of Dumpster Diving, also published by Loompanics. In 2001, Loompanics published a non-fiction book by Backwords, a sort of how-to guide for street people titled Surviving on the Streets: How To Go Down Without Going Out.

In 2009, Backwords published his next book, Acid Heroes, about 1960s icons John Lennon, Ram Dass, Alan Watts, Hunter S. Thompson, R. Crumb, and Jerry Garcia.
