= Lynda Barry =

American cartoonist (born 1956)

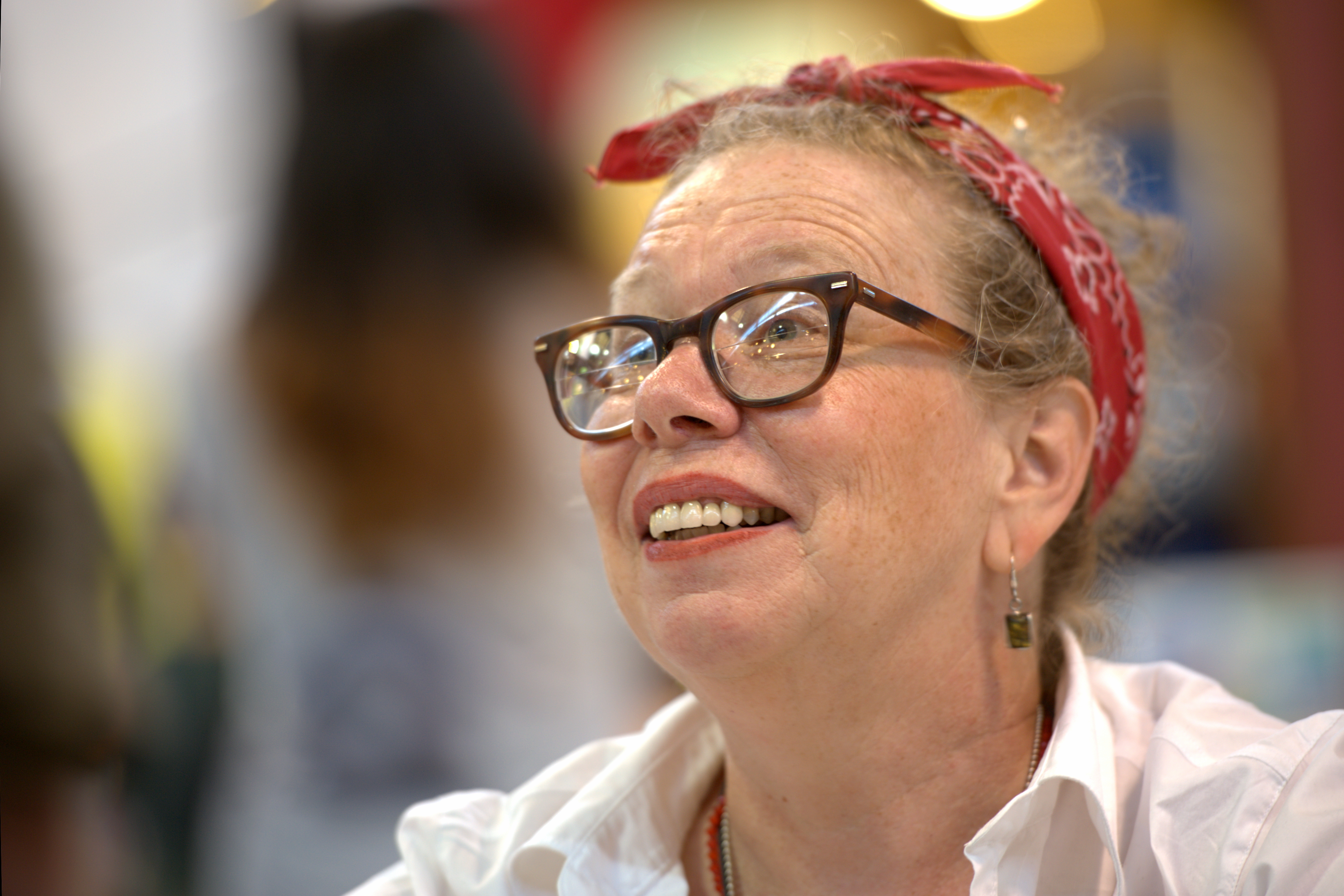
- Barry in 2010
- Born: Linda Jean Barry; January 2, 1956 (age 70) Richland Center, Wisconsin, U.S.
- Areas: Cartoonist, Writer
- Notable works: Ernie Pook's Comeek; The Good Times Are Killing Me

Linda Jean Barry (born January 2, 1956), known professionally as Lynda Barry, is an American cartoonist. Barry is best known for her weekly comic strip Ernie Pook's Comeek. She garnered attention with her 1988 illustrated novel The Good Times are Killing Me, about an interracial friendship between two young girls, which was adapted into a play. Her second illustrated novel, Cruddy, first appeared in 1999. Three years later she published One! Hundred! Demons!, a graphic novel she terms "autobifictionalography". What It Is (2008) is a graphic novel that is part memoir, part collage and part workbook, in which Barry instructs her readers in methods to open up their own creativity; it won the comics industry's 2009 Eisner Award for Best Reality-Based Work.

In recognition of her contributions to the comic art form, ComicsAlliance listed Barry as one of twelve women cartoonists deserving of lifetime achievement recognition, and she received the Wisconsin Visual Art Lifetime Achievement Award in 2013. In July 2016, she was inducted into the Eisner Hall of Fame. Barry was awarded a MacArthur Fellowship as part of the Class of 2019. She is currently an Associate Professor of Interdisciplinary Creativity at the University of Wisconsin–Madison.

In 2020, her work was included in the exhibit Women in Comics: Looking Forward, Looking Back at the Society of Illustrators in New York City.

== Early life and education ==
Linda Jean Barry, who changed her first name to "Lynda" at age 12, was born on Highway 14 in Richland Center, Wisconsin.

Her father was a meat-cutter of Irish and Norwegian descent, and her mother, a hospital housekeeper, was of Irish and Filipino descent. Barry grew up in Seattle, Washington, in a racially mixed working-class neighborhood, and recalls her childhood as difficult and awkward. Her parents divorced when she was 12. By age 16, she was working nights as a janitor at a Seattle hospital while still attending high school, where her classmates included artist Charles Burns and saxophonist Kenny G, with whom she shared his first kiss at a New Year's Eve party. Neither of Barry's parents attended her graduation. Her mother strongly disapproved of Lynda's love of books and desire to go to college; she said they were a waste of time, and that it was time for Lynda to get a job.

At The Evergreen State College in Olympia, Washington, Barry met fellow cartoonist Matt Groening. Her career began in 1977 when Groening and University of Washington Daily student editor John Keister each published her work without her knowledge in their respective student newspapers, titling it Ernie Pook's Comeek.

== Career ==
=== Comics ===
Barry was known as the class cartoonist in her grade school.

While studying fine arts at Evergreen State College, she began drawing comic strips compulsively when her boyfriend left her for another girl: "I couldn't sleep after that, and I started making comic strips about men and women. The men were cactuses and the women were women, and the cactuses were trying to convince the women to go to bed with them, and the women were constantly thinking it over but finally deciding it wouldn't be a good idea." Her first comic strip was created in 1977 and published in the Evergreen State College newspaper. These were the cartoons Groening and Keister published as Ernie Pook's Comeek. Barry also credits her start in comics to Evergreen State professor Marilyn Frasca, saying, "The lessons I learned from her when I was 19 and 20, I still use every day and have never been able to wear out."

After graduating from Evergreen, Barry returned to Seattle. When she was 23, the Chicago Reader picked up her comic strip, enabling her to make a living from her comics alone. She later moved to Chicago, Illinois. As she described her career start:

[Editor] Bob Roth called me from the Chicago Reader as the result of an article [her college classmate] Matt [Groening] wrote about hip West Coast artists — he threw me in just because he was a buddy, right? And then Bob Roth ... called and wanted to see my comic strips, and I didn't have any originals. I didn't know anything about originals, that you don't give them to newspapers because newspapers lose them. So I had to draw a whole set that night and Federal Express them. So I did, and he started printing them, and he paid $80 a week, and I could live off of that. And because he's with this newspaper association, the other papers started picking it up. So it was luck. Sheer luck. [Matt] got into the Los Angeles Reader. For a long time the Los Angeles Reader wouldn't print me, and the Chicago Reader wouldn't print Matt even though they're sister publications. So we both worked on the publishers and the editors to get each other in. It was really funny: when we got into each others' papers, everything sort of took off for both of us.

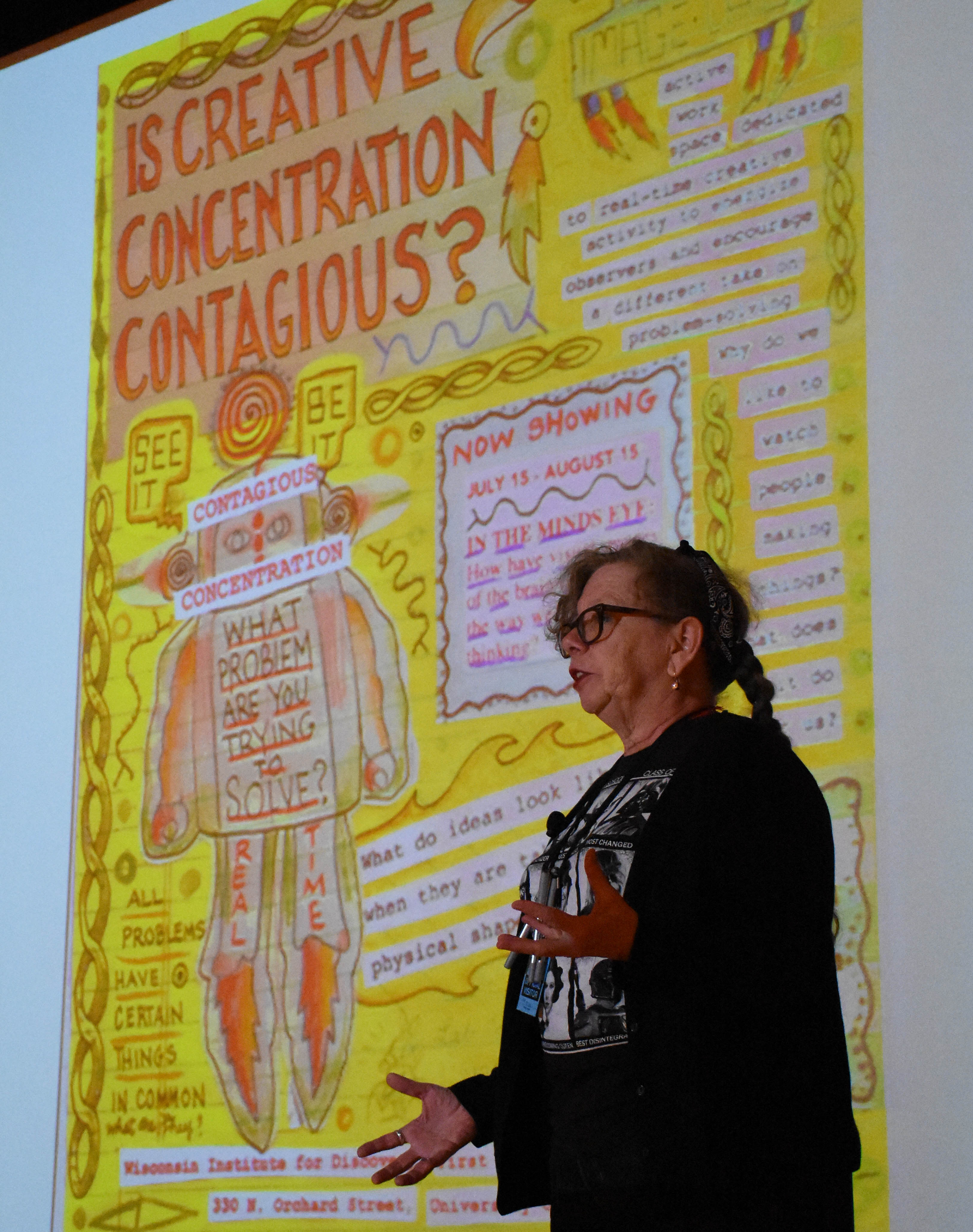
Lynda Barry visits NASA Goddard

Collections of her work include Girls & Boys (1981), Big Ideas (1983), Everything in the World (1986), The Fun House (1987), Down the Street (1989), and The Greatest of Marlys (2000). In 1984, she released a coloring book with brief text called Naked Ladies! Naked Ladies! Naked Ladies! She also wrote and drew a full-page color strip examining the everyday pathology of relationships for Esquire magazine, starting in 1983 with the strip "The Story of Men and Women". In 1989 Barry's strip appeared weekly in more than 50 publications, mostly alternative newspapers in large cities.

Barry has described her process as developing a story while working, not planning it out in advance. In answering a question about her book What It Is in an interview with Michael Dean for The Comics Journal, Barry said:

There were big realizations and small ones. The biggest one was the same one I had when I wrote Cruddy. The realization that the back of the mind can be relied on to create natural story order. It's not something I have to try to do, or think too hard about. If I just work every day on a particular project, it seems to begin to form itself if I keep moving my hands while maintaining a certain state of mind.

Due to the loss of weekly newspaper clients, Barry moved her comics primarily online by 2007.

=== Books ===
Commercially published collections of Barry's comics began appearing in 1981 . Her limited edition self published Xerox book called Two Sisters about sisters Evette and Rita was published in 1979. She has written two illustrated novels, The Good Times Are Killing Me (1988) and Cruddy, also known as Cruddy: An Illustrated Novel (1999).

Cruddy is written in the voice of a fictional girl named Roberta Rohbeson, who describes her home as "the cruddy top bedroom of a cruddy rental house on a very cruddy mud road" and who ends up in a string of violent adventures with her father. Barry addressed the violence in the book in an interview with Hillary Chute in The Believer, saying:

Cruddy has murder galore. It's, like, you know, it's murder fiesta, and lots of knives and killing. ... So does that mean that I'm a person who thinks about murder? Well, yes, as a matter of fact, I do think about murder constantly. Actually, when I'm talking to people who are driving me crazy, I often imagine they have an ax in their forehead while they're talking to me. I know that that's my personal relationship with murder and knives and blood. It doesn't mean that I need to go do that.

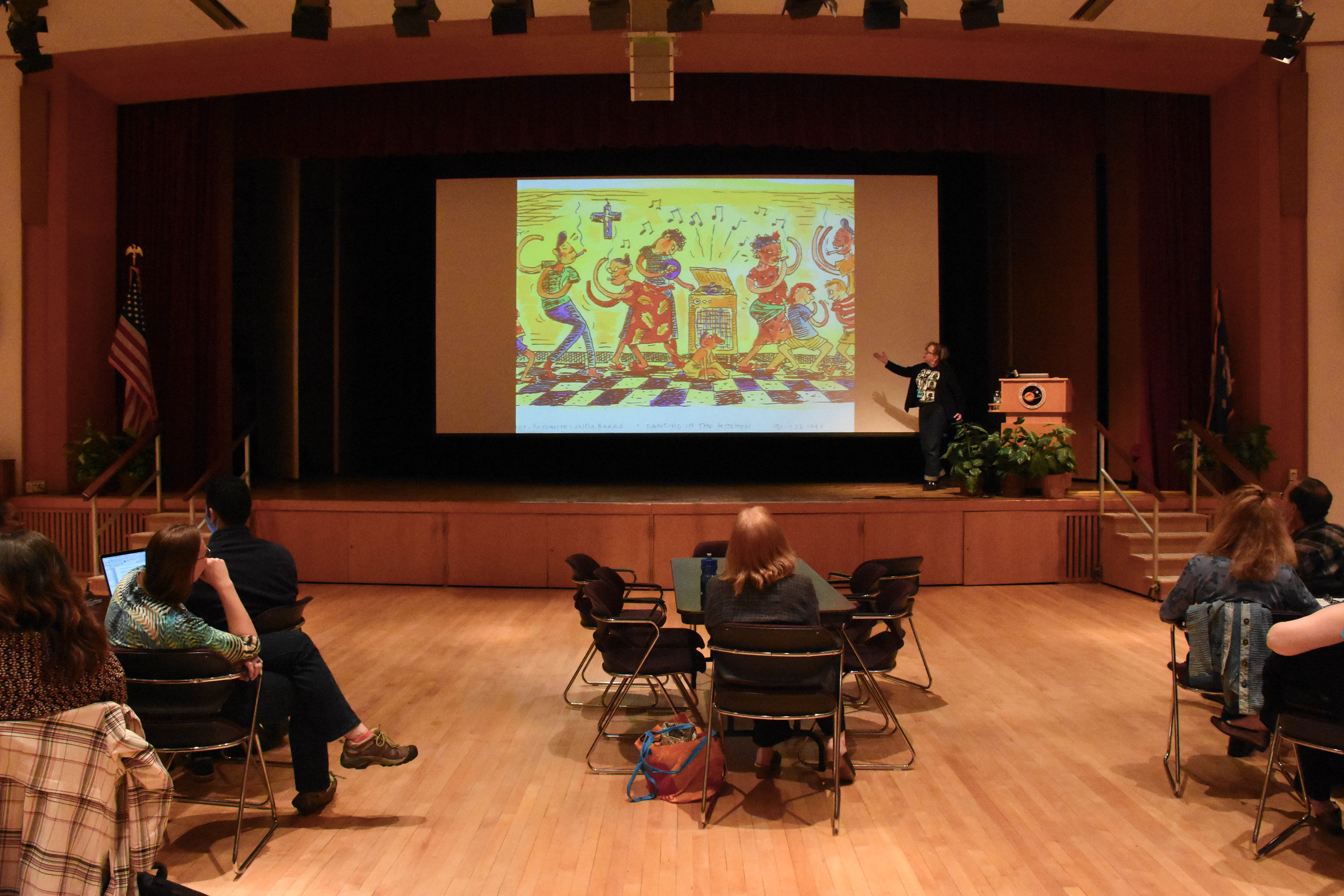
Lynda Barry presenting the benefits of creativity in everyday life at NASA Goddard

The book was well regarded by critics. Alanna Nash wrote in The New York Times that "the author's ability to capture the paralyzing bleakness of despair, and her uncanny ear for dialogue, make this first novel a work of terrible beauty." In The Austin Chronicle, Stephen MacMillan Moser wrote a review in the form of a letter to Barry, saying "You blew me away. Sometimes I wasn't sure if something was supposed to be funny or not, but I laughed a lot. But I also feel like I got run over by a bus." In 2013, English professor Ellen E. Berry published a paper focused on the novel titled "Becoming‐Girl/Becoming‐Fly/Becoming‐Imperceptible: Gothic Posthumanism in Lynda Barry's Cruddy: An Illustrated Novel." Berry wrote in her summary of the paper that the book is "a vivid example of what I call 'gothic posthumanism' in which gothic themes and tropes serve to advance an extensive critique of anthropo‐ and other centrisms, all forms of domination, the values of liberal humanism and affirmative conformist culture." Berry analyzes Cruddy using a theory of posthuman ethics articulated by Rosi Braidotti, writing that she used Braidotti's theory "to analyze Roberta's survival strategies and her radically posthuman identification with animals centering on their shared vulnerability and thus their shared goal: to disappear and to survive."

Barry adapted The Good Times are Killing Me as an Off-Broadway play (see below).

One! Hundred! Demons! first appeared as a serialized comic on Salon.com; according to the book's introduction, it was produced in emulation of an old Zen painting exercise called "one hundred demons". In this exercise, the practitioner awaits the arrival of demons and then paints them as they arise in the mind. The demons Barry wrestles with in this book include regret, abusive relationships, self-consciousness, the prohibition against feeling hate, and her response to the results of the 2000 U.S. presidential election. The book contains an instructional section that encourages readers to take up the brush and follow her example. According to Time magazine, the book uses "acutely-observed humor to explore the pain of growing up."

Barry created the comic book in the latter years of the 1990s as she wrote Cruddy, after she took up painting using a sumi brush. A total of seventeen strips were published in Salon.com from April 2000 to January 2001. In the Sasquatch Books edition published in 2002, she reduced each strip from twenty panels to eighteen, added an introduction to each story, an "Outro," which was also a guide on how to make a strip and collage pages within the stories. Some strips have topics relating to Barry's Filipino American heritage; in "Common Scents," the young narrator discovers that their house has a distinctive smell compared to those of the neighbors. Scholar Susan Kirtley says that this work marks a new era for Barry in her artistic works.

Barry has also published four books about the creative processes of writing and drawing. Making Comics, What It Is, Picture This, and Syllabus: Notes From an Accidental Professor focus on opening pathways to personal creativity. Publishers Weekly gave Syllabus a starred review, calling it "an excellent guide for those seeking to break out of whatever writing and drawing styles they have been stuck in, allowing them to reopen their brains to the possibility of new creativity." The AV Club named Syllabus one of the best comics of 2014.

=== Other media ===
Barry adapted her illustrated novel The Good Times are Killing Me (1988) as an off-Broadway play that had 106 performances from March 26 to June 23, 1991, at the McGinn-Cazale Theatre at 2162 Broadway, and 136 performances from July 30 to November 24, 1991, at the Minetta Lane Theatre. It was directed by Mark Brokaw and produced by Second Stage Theatre, with the Minetta Lane portion produced by Concert Productions International. Angela Goethals won a 1990–91 Obie Award for her lead role as Edna Arkins. Chandra Wilson as Bonna Willis won a 1991 Theatre World Award. Barry was nominated for the 1992 Outer Critics Circle's John Gassner Award.

In its March–April 1991 issue, Mother Jones published Barry's essay "War", which protested the first Gulf War: "War becomes part of our DNA...How dare anyone purposefully bring it into our lives when other options remain?" Barry had previously read the essay on Chicago Public Radio's program The Wild Room, which she co-hosted with Ira Glass and Gary Covino.

=== Workshops and teaching ===
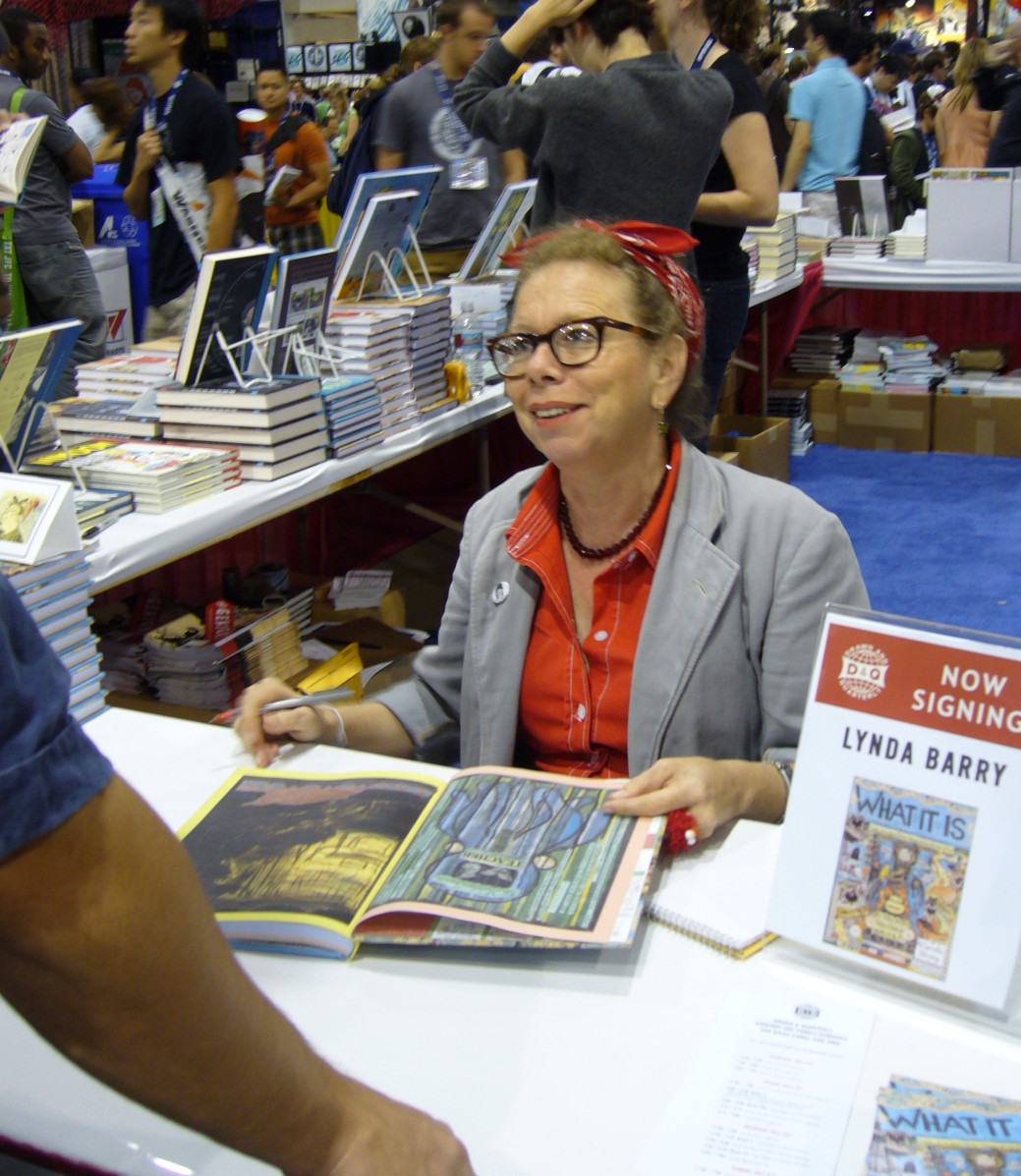
Lynda Barry signing What It Is at San Diego Comicon in 2008

Barry offers a workshop titled "Writing the Unthinkable" through the Omega Institute in Rhinebeck, New York, and The Crossings in Austin, Texas, in which she teaches the process she uses to create all of her work. Barry conducts approximately 15 writing workshops around the country each year. She credits her teacher, Marilyn Frasca at The Evergreen State College, with teaching her these creativity and writing techniques. Many of these techniques appear in her book What It Is. A New York Times article about her writing workshops summed up her technique: "Barry isn't particularly interested in the writer's craft. She's more interested in where ideas come from—and her goal is to help people tap into what she considers to be an innate creativity."

In the spring term of 2012, Barry was artist in residence at the University of Wisconsin–Madison Arts Institute and Department of Art. She taught a class, What It Is: Manually Shifting the Image.

She joined the faculty of University of Wisconsin–Madison in 2013 as an assistant professor in the art department and through the Wisconsin Institute for Discovery. During September 24–28, 2012, Barry was the artist in residence at Capilano University in North Vancouver, British Columbia.

== Other associates ==
As of 2013, singer and friend Kelly Hogan was working as an assistant for Barry, helping her arrange her teaching schedule. In one episode of Barry's Ernie Pook's Comeek, children are peering in a window of the Hideout nightclub in Chicago, listening to Hogan's band The Wooden Leg.

== Personal life ==
For a time, Barry dated public-radio personality Ira Glass. She briefly joined him in Washington, D.C., but a few months later, in the summer of 1989, she moved to Chicago to be near fellow cartoonists. Glass followed her there. Reflecting on the relationship, she called it the "worst thing I ever did," and said he told her she "was boring and shallow, and...wasn't enough in the moment for him." She later drew a comic based on their relationship titled "Head Lice and My Worst Boyfriend", which was later included in her book One! Hundred! Demons!... Glass has not denied her assertions, and told the Chicago Reader, "I was an idiot. I was in the wrong...About so many things with her. Anything bad she says about me I can confirm."

Barry is married to Kevin Kawula, a prairie restoration expert. They met while she was an artist in residence at the Ragdale Foundation and he was land manager of the Lake Forest Open Lands project in Lake Forest, Illinois. In 2002 they moved to a dairy farm near Footville, Wisconsin.

Barry is an outspoken critic of wind turbines and has lobbied the Wisconsin government for clearer zoning regulations for turbines being built in residential areas. She has also spoken out about wind power's problems with noise pollution, human health, and efficiency as related to variability.

In 1994, Barry suffered a near-fatal case of dengue fever.

== Awards ==
- 1988 Inkpot Award
- 2004 Women Cartoonists Hall of Fame (Friends of Lulu)
- 2009 Eisner Award: Best Reality-Based Work winner: What It Is
- 2019 MacArthur Fellow

== Published works ==
- Girls and Boys (Real Comet Press 1981) ISBN 0-941104-00-1
- Big Ideas (Real Comet Press 1983) ISBN 0-941104-07-9
- Naked Ladies, Naked Ladies, Naked Ladies: Coloring Book (Real Comet Press 1984) ISBN 978-0941104135
- Everything in the World (HarperCollins 1986) ISBN 978-0060961077
- Down the Street (HarperCollins 1988) ISBN 978-0060963040
- The Fun House (HarperCollins 1988) ISBN 0-06-096228-3
- The Good Times Are Killing Me (Perennial/HarperCollins, 1988) ISBN 0-941104-22-2
- Come Over, Come Over (HarperCollins 1990) ISBN 0-06-096504-5
- My Perfect Life (Perennial/HarperCollins 1992) ISBN 978-0060965051
- The Lynda Barry Experience (spoken word cassette tape/CD 1993) ISBN 1-882543-17-3
- It's So Magic (Perennial/HarperCollins 1994) ISBN 978-0060950460
- The Freddie Stories (Sasquatch Books 1999) ISBN 978-1570611063
- Cruddy (Simon & Schuster hardcover 1999) ISBN 978-0684865300 (paperback 2000) ISBN 978-0684838465
- The Greatest of Marlys (Sasquatch Books 2000) ISBN 1-57061-260-9
- One! Hundred! Demons! (Sasquatch Books 2002) ISBN 9781570613371
- What It Is (Drawn & Quarterly 2008) ISBN 978-1897299357
- Picture This: The Near-Sighted Monkey Book (Drawn & Quarterly 2010) ISBN 1-897299-64-8
- Blabber Blabber Blabber: Volume 1 of Everything (Drawn & Quarterly 2011) ISBN 978-1770460522
- Syllabus: Notes from an Accidental Professor (Drawn & Quarterly 2014) ISBN 978-1770461611
- The Greatest of Marlys (Drawn & Quarterly hardcover 2016) ISBN 978-1770462649
- Making Comics (Drawn & Quarterly 2019) ISBN 978-1770463691
