= Dennis Eichhorn =

American writer (1945–2015)

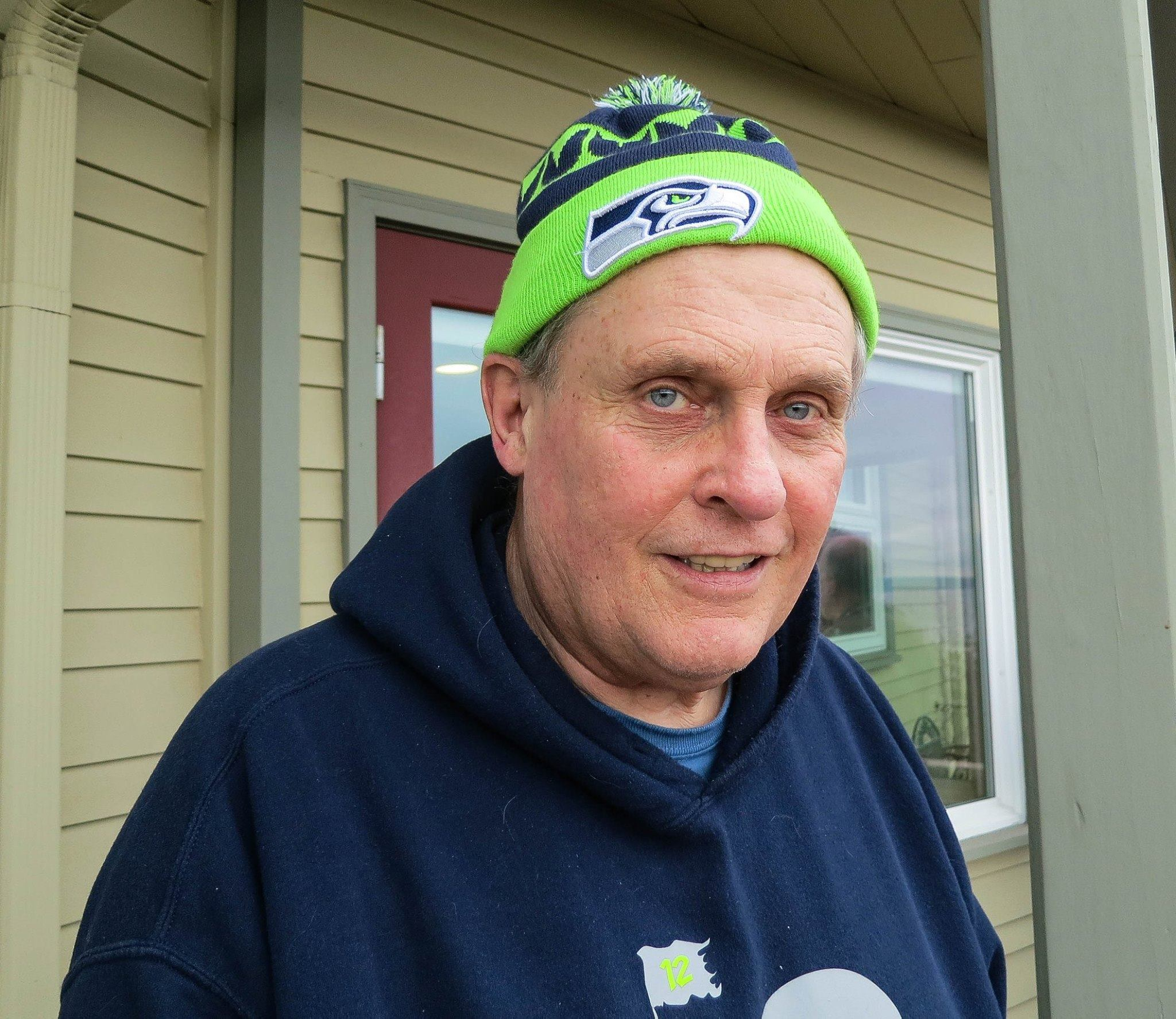
- Eichhorn, photographed in 2015.
- Born: August 19, 1945 Deer Lodge, Montana
- Died: October 8, 2015 (aged 70) [Bremerton WA]
- Area: Writer
- Pseudonyms: Dr. D. D. Drakely, Reverend Drakely, Ike Horn, Federal Duck
- Notable works: Real Stuff
- Awards: Harvey Award, 1999

Dennis P. Eichhorn (August 19, 1945 – October 8, 2015) was an American writer, best known for his adult-oriented autobiographical comic book series Real Stuff. His stories, often involving sex, drugs, and alcohol, have been compared to those of Jack Kerouac, Ken Kesey, and Charles Bukowski.

== Biography ==
=== Early life and career ===
Eichhorn was born in Deer Lodge, Montana, in the infirmary of Montana State Prison. He was adopted when he was a few days old by Eileen and Elmer Eichhorn, and reared in Boise, Idaho. He graduated from Boise's Borah High School in 1963. He graduated from Boise Junior College (now Boise State University) and played football on athletic scholarships at Whitman College and the University of Idaho; he graduated from the latter with a B.A. in Sociology in 1968. He didn't learn he was adopted until he was in his 30s, and never met his birth mother.

Concurrent with his literary work, Eichhorn held a variety of jobs in fields that included hospitality services, driving, social work, and manual labor. For four years, Eichhorn also served as promoter and operator of the Blue Mountain Festival, an outdoor music festival held in the spring at the University of Idaho's Arboretum, and was the primary organizer of the 1971 Universal Life Church Picnic, a large festival held over the Fourth of July weekend in northern Idaho's Farragut State Park. (A book was written about Eichhorn's organizing of the picnic by Stanley D. Crow, at the behest of the state of Idaho, called The Farragut Report. A study of the Universal Life Church picnic held at Farragut State Park and recommendations for legislative and administrative action.) Eichhorn spent time in state prison for selling marijuana and LSD.

=== Writer ===
Eichhorn was a contributing writer to The Argonaut, the University of Idaho's student newspaper, while a student there in 1968. (He also edited an underground comic book during that time, The Moscow Duck Review, writing one of the stories which was rendered by Reilly Clark.) While living in San Francisco in 1977, his interview with the band Crime was published in New York City's Punk magazine, his first national exposure. Soon afterwards, Eichhorn was briefly a stringer for Jim Wilde, a writer for Time magazine, and then worked as a research assistant for writer Bill Cardoso.

Moving to Seattle in the late 1970s, Eichorn became a writer and later entertainment editor for the weekly Seattle Sun newspaper, from 1980 until its demise in 1982. He then became a writer and senior editor at The Rocket, a monthly music magazine, from 1982 until 1991. At The Rocket, Eichhorn met a number of Seattle-area and northwestern cartoonists and illustrators who eventually became contributors to his autobiographical series Real Stuff and Real Smut.

While at The Rocket, Eichhorn was contacted by Gerry Turman, owner of Turman Publishing, a company which published literature and teachers' aids for use in remedial reading classes. Turman offered him a position as staff writer, which he eventually turned into a lucrative side business from 1983 until 1994, writing hundreds of articles for Stars magazine and 18 biographical books about celebrities and professional athletes.

From 1988–1990, Eichhorn was publisher and editor of the Northwest EXTRA!, a "lurid, pulp tabloid" zine which ran for 15 issues. (A 16th issue was published in 2001.)

From 1991-1993, Eichhorn was regular contributor to Seattle's Hype Magazine, a largely forgotten underground fanzine about Seattle Grunge and Punk Rock. He wrote a monthly comic, which he had illustrated by others. He signed up many significant artists, including most of the Fantagraphics legends. For Hype he also once solicited an original poem from Charles Bukowski, which was printed, but has since been lost.

In 1994, Eichhorn became editorial director for Loompanics Unlimited, a mail-order libertarian publishing and book distribution company in Port Townsend, Washington, a position which he held for four years. Eichhorn was responsible for the publication of 65 books during this time, wrote dozens of articles and hundreds of book synopses for Loompanics' publications and catalogs, and oversaw contractual agreements with writers, as well as movie rights and foreign translations.

=== Comics ===
Before becoming a comics writer, Eichhorn had read the work of Justin Green, Robert Crumb, Frank Stack, and Harvey Pekar. (The Rocket had occasionally run Pekar's strips while Eichhorn worked there.)

In the early 1980s, Eichhorn met cartoonist Peter Bagge in Seattle. This led to Eichhorn's inclusion in Weirdo magazine, which Bagge edited at that time. Eichhorn began writing autobiographical stories for sequential illustration, which he described as "anecdotal tales gleaned from [his] life's experiences". The first two were rendered by Carel Moiseiwitsch and Michael Dougan. This led to Eichhorn's creation of the anthology series Real Stuff, published from 1990 to 1995 by Seattle-based Fantagraphics.

Eichhorn followed Pekar's example of writing true stories for others to illustrate, but unlike Pekar, Eichhorn emphasized action-filled tales of sex, substance abuse, and violence, many taking place in Eichhorn's native state of Idaho. The title was an amalgamation of two preexisting comic book titles: Mark Zingarelli's Real Life and Peter Bagge's Neat Stuff. Stories in the Eisner Award-nominated series were illustrated by many artists, including Ed Brubaker, Rick Altergott, Donna Barr, Lynda Barry, Jim Blanchard, Ariel Bordeaux, Chester Brown, Bob Crabb, Julie Doucet, Éric Thériault, Gene Fama, Mary Fleener, Ellen Forney, Renee French, Roberta Gregory, Aline Kominsky-Crumb, Peter Kuper, Paul Mavrides, Pat Moriarity, Joe Sacco, Triangle-Slash, Holly Tuttle, J. R. Williams, Jim Woodring, Mark Zingrarelli, and numerous others. After nine issues, Fantagraphics experienced problems shipping Real Stuff to Canada and the United Kingdom because of the explicit sexual content, and a sexually explicit spin-off series Real Smut was created in 1992, to remove that material from Real Stuff.

From 1992 until 2006 Eichhorn wrote comic stories (as well as articles and book reviews) for Scram magazine, a Los Angeles music publication.

In 1993 Eichhorn funded Starhead Comix's publication of Real Schmuck comix. He also paid for Starhead's publication of two other titles, The Amazing Adventures of Ace International in 1993 and Northwest Cartoon Cookery in 1995. He fell out with his publisher Fantagraphics in 1995.

In 2004, Top Shelf Productions released The Legend of Wild Man Fischer, a collection of comic book stories about the outsider musician (most of which had appeared in Real Stuff) which Eichhorn co-authored with artists J. R. Williams and Holly Tuttle. In that same year, Swifty Morales Press published Real Stuff by Dennis P. Eichhorn and a Host of Artists, a collection of stories from Eichhorn's comic books and other sources. Eichhorn said that the preponderance of violent stories in this book resulted from the publisher's selection of material, pointing out that the book contains "less than a quarter" of his output as of October 2003.

Eichhorn entered into an agreement with Boing Boing in 2013 to post some of his old Real Stuff comics online.

Eichhorn's work was mentioned, though not reprinted, in the 2015 and 2016 editions of The Best American Comics.

== Personal life ==
Eichhorn was married three times: first to Kip Charlson, then Joan Pelley, and finally Jane Rebelowski. He had a daughter Sarah (born in 1977), and a grandson Knox (born in 2004). He lived in Bremerton, Washington. Eichhorn died on October 8, 2015, from pneumonia.

== Other ==
In October 1993 an interview with Eichhorn was featured in The Comics Journal #162. Eichhorn was featured on the cover of the magazine along with other autobiographical comic book creators.

== Movies ==
Dennis Eichhorn has appeared in two documentaries:

- Hooked On Comix - Volume 1 - Life On The Cutting Edge Of An All-American Artform (2006)
- Derailroaded: Inside The Mind Of Larry 'Wild Man' Fischer (2011)

== Awards and honors ==
=== Eisner Award ===
- Eisner Award Finalist, Best Writer, 1993
- Eisner Award Finalist, Best Continuing Series (Real Stuff), 1993
- Eisner Award Finalist, Best Anthology (Real Stuff), 1993
- Eisner Award Finalist, Best Anthology (Real Stuff), 1994

=== Harvey Award ===
- Harvey Award, Best New Series (The Spirit: The New Adventures), 1999 [Won]

=== Ignatz Award ===
- Ignatz Award Finalist, Outstanding Story (The Legend of Wildman Fischer), 2005

=== The Best American Comics (by Bill Kartaloupous) ===
- 2015 Notable Comics, Real Good Stuff #1 & #2
- 2016 Notable Comics, Extra Good Stuff

== Bibliography ==
=== Comic books ===
as writer, unless otherwise noted

==== Creator titles ====
- Heavystreet Komikx #1-3 (self-published, 1969) {13.5 x 12 cm}
- Real Life #1 (Fantagraphics, 1990)
- Real Stuff (20 issues, Fantagraphics, 1990–1994)
- Real Smut (6 issues, Eros/Fantagraphics, 1992–1993)
- Real Schmuck (Starhead Comix, 1993)
- The Amazing Adventures of Ace International (Starhead Comix, 1993)
- The Legend of Wild Man Fischer (Top Shelf Productions, 2004) ISBN 1-891830-61-9
- Real Stuff by Dennis P. Eichhorn and a Host of Artists (Swifty Morales Press, 2004) ISBN 0-9745870-0-1
- Real Good Stuff #1 & #2 (Poochie Press, 2013)
- Extra Good Stuff (Last Gasp, 2015)

==== Anthology works ====
- Moscow Duck Review (1974) — editor/writer
- Weirdo #14, #16, and #19 (Last Gasp, 1985, 1987)
- The New Comics Anthology (Collier Books, 1991)
- Naughty Bits #5 (Fantagraphics, 1991)
- True North 2 (Andromeda Comics, 1991)
- A Couple of Winos (Fantagraphics, 1991)
- Playgrounds #1 (Fantagraphics, 1991)
- Scott Russo's Jizz #8 (Fantagraphics, 1991)
- Tales From The Outer Boroughs #1 (Gary Groth & Kim Thompson, 1991)
- Drawn & Quarterly Vol. 1 #7-8 (Drawn & Quarterly, 1992)
- Attitude Lad #1 (Iconographix, 1992)
- Dancing With Your Eyes Closed (Iconografix, 1992)
- Scram [vol.1] #2 and #3 (Scram, 1992)
- Big Mouth #1-2, 4-5 (Fantagraphics, Starhead Comix, 1992–1995)
- MegaPyton #199201 (Egmont Kärnan, 1992, in Swedish)
- I Like Comics #1 (Makeshift Media, 1993)
- Destroy All Comic Books #1 (Slave Labor Graphics, 1993)
- Real Big Thing Stuff (self-published, 1994) {As both writer and artist}
- Colin Upton's Authorized Big Black Thing (Starhead Comix, 1994)
- Sex Kinks of the Rich and Famous (Rip Off Press, 1994)
- Wiindows #21 (Cult Press, 1994)
- Hands Off! #1 (Ward Sutton, 1994)
- Attitude Lad #1 (Slave Labor Graphics, 1994)
- Northwest Cartoon Cookery (Starhead Comix, 1995)
- The Ersatz Peach (Aeon, 1995)
- Rapture (Starhead Comix, 1995)
- Popcorn Pimps (Fantagraphics, 1996)
- Schizo #2 (Fantagraphics, 1996)
- Boing Boing Magazine (Boing Boing, 1996)
- Bad Meat #3 (Beef Eye, 1997)
- Howie Action Comics #1 (Andy Brown, 1999)
- Too Much Coffee Man The Magazine #11 and #13 (Adhesive Comics, Inc., 2001)
- Scram #16 (Scram, 2002)
- Will Eisner's The Spirit: The New Adventures #7 (Kitchen Sink Press, 1998); later re-published in Will Eisner's The Spirit: The New Adventures (Spirit Archives) (Dark Horse Books, 2009) ISBN 978-1569717325
- Mineshaft Magazine #24, #26, and #27 (Mineshaft Magazine, 2008, 2011) *
- Idaho Comics #1–2 (Idaho Comics Group, 2014–2015)
- Outside The Panels (Look Mom, Comics!, 2015)
- Tarzan and the Comics of Idaho #1–3 (Idaho Comics Group, 2014–2016, #3 posthumous)
- Northwest Cartoonists Cookbook (Fantagraphics, 2017, posthumous)
- Julie Doucet: Cómics 1994-2016 (Fulgencio Pimentel S.L., 2017, posthumous, in Spanish)
- Who Killed Hunter S. Thompson? (ISBN 978-0867198553) (Last Gasp, 2018, posthumous)
- The Book of Weirdo: A Retrospective of R. Crumb's Legendary Humor Comics Anthology (ISBN 978-0867198751) (Last Gasp, 2019, posthumous)
- Spread Love Comix #12 (Spread Love Comix, 2022, posthumous)
- Mineshaft Magazine #34 contains a wonderful story that is a tribute to Dennis Eichhorn and his friendship by David Collier entitled, "The Big Book of Nostalgia...Revisited."

=== Turman Publishing Co. ===
- Cosby (ISBN 978-0833531278) 1986
- Jordan (ISBN 978-0898722086) 1987
- Springsteen (ISBN 978-0898722048) 1987
- Murphy (ISBN 978-0898722093) 1987
- Cruise (ISBN 978-0898722079) 1987
- Macchio (ISBN 978-0898722123) 1987
- Fox (ISBN 978-0898722109) 1987
- Whitney (ISBN 978-0898722116) 1987
- Tyson (ISBN 978-0898722147) 1987
- Bon Jovi (ISBN 978-0898722130) 1987
- Stallone (ISBN 9780898722055) 1987
- Elway (ISBN 978-0898722406) 1988
- Hammer (ISBN 978-0898722192) 1993
- Shaq (ISBN 978-0898722215) 1995
