= Cathead (disambiguation) =

A Cathead is a beam on a ship for raising the anchor. Cathead, Catshead, or Cat head also may refer to:

- a windlass or capstan used in machinery such as a hoisting drawworks for a drilling rig
- A type of biscuit in the cuisine of the Southern United States. Also spelled cat head.
- The Cat Heads, San Francisco indie rock band
- Tim Phillips (musician), of the band Cathead
- Cat heads, an inexpensive copy of the Converse Chuck Taylor All-Stars
- Cat-Head Comics, a defunct comic book publisher
- The head of a cat
- Catshead (architecture), a roof extension on mills or barns
- Catshead (apple), a cultivar of cooking apples
- Catshead, an alternate name for the Pseudagrion coeleste species of damselfly
- Cathead or cat's head, the pest plants Rumex hypogaeus or Tribulus terrestris
