= Sun Devils =

Sun Devils or Sun Devil may refer to:

- Arizona State Sun Devils, nickname for the sports teams of Arizona State University.
- Sun Devils (comics), a DC Comics maxi-series
- Sun Devils Drum and Bugle Corps of Orlando, Florida.
- Sun Devil Gym, arena in Tempe, Arizona, United States
- Sun Devil Marching Band of Arizona State University.
- Sun Devil Stadium, outdoor football stadium on the campus of Arizona State University in Tempe, Arizona, United States
