= Honk (magazine) =

American comics magazine

Honk!

Publication information
- Publisher: Fantagraphics Books
- Schedule: Bimonthly
- Format: Ongoing series
- Publication date: November 1986 - July 1987
- No. of issues: 5
- Editor(s): Tom Mason (issues #1–3); Joe Sacco (issues #4–5)

Honk! was an American comics magazine published in the 1980s by Fantagraphics Books, featuring creator interviews, reviews, satirical articles, and original comic strips. Similar in format to Mad magazine, but with an alternative/underground twist, Honk! was edited by Tom Mason (issues #1–3) and then Joe Sacco (issues #4–5).

The 52-page magazine-sized publication was published bimonthly from November 1986–July 1987.

== Issues ==
1. (November 1986) —10-page interview with Don Martin (MAD), with comics by Chester Brown, Dan Clowes, Glenn Dakin, Gary Whitney, Bob Boze Bell, J. R. Williams, Eddie Campbell, and Marc Hempel
2. (January 1987) — Bill Watterson (Calvin and Hobbes)
3. (March 1987) — Matt Groening (The Simpsons, Life in Hell)
4. (May 1987) — David Boswell (Reid Fleming)
5. (July 1987) — Bill Griffith (Zippy the Pinhead)

== See also ==
- The Comics Journal
