= Lee Weeks =

American comics artist (born 1962)

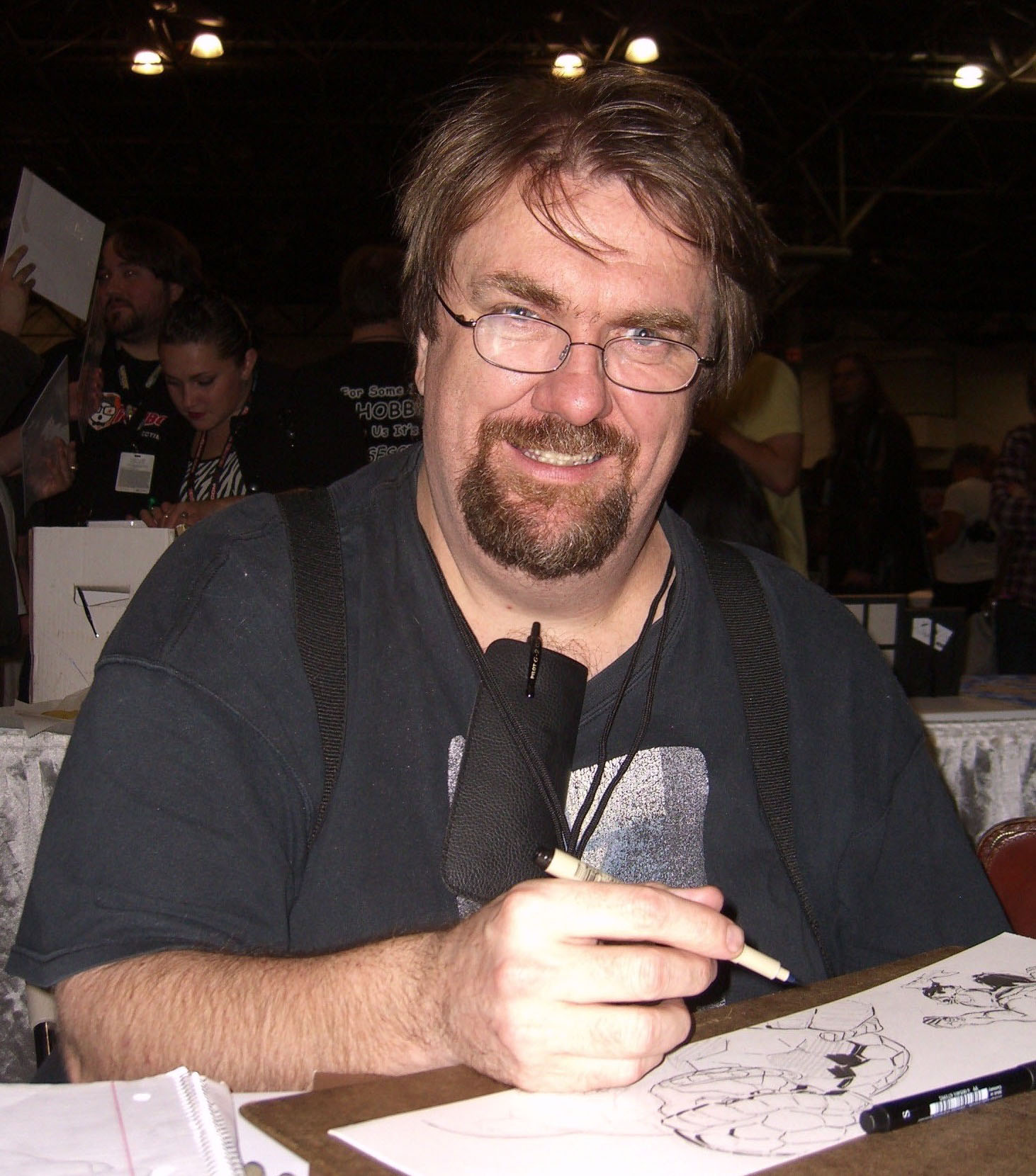
- Weeks at the New York Comic Con in Manhattan, October 9, 2010
- Born: October 21, 1962 (age 64) Augusta, Maine, U.S.
- Areas: Penciler, inker, writer
- Notable works: The Batman Chronicles: Gauntlet; Daredevil; Gambit; Spiderman: Death and Destiny; Superman: Lois and Clark
- Awards: Haxtur Award: Best Short Story (with Bruce Jones and Josef Rubinstein - 2003; Inkwell Awards All-in-One Award (2019))

Lee Weeks (born October 21, 1962) is an American comics artist known for his work on such titles as Daredevil.

== Career ==
Lee Weeks attended The Kubert School and made his professional comics debut penciling, inking, and lettering a short story ("Friends Don't Let Friends Drive Drunk") in Tales of Terror #5 (March 1986), a horror anthology published by Eclipse Comics. He is best known for his work for Marvel Comics on the Daredevil series (1990–1992), where he pencilled the Last Rites storyline. It featured the fall of the Kingpin and is a sequel of sorts to Frank Miller and David Mazzucchelli's Born Again.

He collaborated with writer Howard Mackie on the Gambit limited series in 1993–1994. At Dark Horse Comics, Weeks drew the Predator vs. Magnus, Robot Fighter and Tarzan vs. Predator: At the Earth's Core crossovers. Back at Marvel, he wrote and drew the Spider-Man: Death and Destiny limited series in 2000 and worked with Tom DeFalco on Spider-Man: The Mysterio Manifesto the following year.

Other Marvel Comics titles he has contributed to include Justice (1988–1989), The Destroyer (1989–1990), Spider-Man's Tangled Web (2002), Captain America vol. 4 #17-20 (with writer Dave Gibbons) (2003), The Incredible Hulk vol. 3 (2002, 2005) and the five-part Captain Marvel (2008) mini-series.

In a brief period with DC Comics, Weeks penciled the 1997 48-page bookshelf format book, The Batman Chronicles: Gauntlet, which was written by Bruce Canwell. He also worked as a storyboard artist for Superman: The Animated Series.

Weeks is the subject of the seventeenth volume of the Modern Masters series published by TwoMorrows Publishing in 2008.

Weeks is the writer and artist of "Angels Unaware", the opening three issue storyline of the eight-issue, Marvel anthology miniseries Daredevil: Dark Nights. James Hunt of Comic Book Resources gave the first issue four and a half out of five stars. While Hunt praised Weeks' writing, he stated, "It's Weeks' art which really sells the story. Weeks is a very visual storyteller whose ideas translate fantastically onto the page, whether it's the ambiance of snow-covered streets or the fluid, weighty action scenes. The world looks grimy, yet ethereal. It's clear that the artists have a rock-solid grip on the character." The second issue was also given four and a half out of five stars by CBR's Kelly Thompson, who called it "hauntingly beautiful and surprisingly complex in the way it addresses the ideas of being a superhero", and that the storyline is a "fantastic" look at the character. He worked on Superman: Lois and Clark in 2015 with writer Dan Jurgens. In 2017, Weeks drew a Batman/Elmer Fudd one-shot.

== Awards ==
In 2003, Lee Weeks shared the Haxtur Award for "Best Short Story" with Bruce Jones and Josef Rubinstein.

In 2019, Weeks was awarded the Inkwell Awards All-in-One Award, having received 31% of the votes for that category.

In 2023, Weeks was a recipient of the Inkpot Award at the annual San Diego Comic Con.

== Bibliography ==
=== Dark Horse Comics ===
- Comics' Greatest World: Ghost (#3) (1993)
- Comics Greatest World: Monster (#4) (1993)
- Comics Greatest World: Pit Bulls (#2) (1993)
- Comics Greatest World: X (#1) (1993)
- Comics' Greatest World: Barb Wire (#9) (1993)
- Comics' Greatest World: Catalyst: Agents of Change (#8) (1993)
- Comics' Greatest World: Division 13 (#13) (1993)
- Comics' Greatest World: Hero Zero (#14) (1993)
- Comics' Greatest World: King Tiger (#15) (1993)
- Comics' Greatest World: Mecha (#6) (1993)
- Comics' Greatest World: Motorhead (#12) (1993)
- Comics' Greatest World: Out of the Vortex (#16) (1993)
- Comics' Greatest World: Rebel (#5) (1993)
- Comics' Greatest World: The Machine (#10) (1993)
- Comics' Greatest World: Titan (#7) (1993)
- Comics' Greatest World: Wolf Gang (#11) (1993)
- Predator vs. Magnus, Robot Fighter #1–2 (1992)
- Tarzan vs. Predator at the Earth's Core #1–4 (1996)

=== DC Comics ===
- Action Comics #1052–1053, 1055–1057 (2023)
- Batman vol. 3 #50 (one page), 51–53, 67, Annual #2 (2018–2019)
- Batman Black and White vol. 5 #5 ("Signals" story) (2021)
- The Batman Chronicles #1, 7 (1995–1997)
- The Batman Chronicles: The Gauntlet #1 (1997)
- Batman/Elmer Fudd #1 (2017)
- Batman: Legends of the Dark Knight #100 (1997)
- Convergence: Superman #1 (2015)
- Detective Comics #679–680 (1994)
- Heroes in Crisis #3 (2019)
- Secret Origins vol. 3 #1 (Superman) (2014)
- Starman Secret Files #1 (1998)
- Superman: Futures End #1 (2014)
- Superman: Lois and Clark #1–8 (2015–2016)
- Superman: Lost #7 (2023)
- Tales from Earth-6: A Celebration of Stan Lee #1 (2023)
- Titans vol. 3 #7 (2017)

=== Eclipse Comics ===
- Alien Encounters #6, 9 (1986)
- Miracleman #8 ("New Wave" backup story) (1986)
- The New Wave #2 (1986)
- Tales of Terror #5 (1986)

=== Marvel Comics ===
- The Amazing Spider-Man vol. 2 #29 (2001)
- The Amazing Spider-Man #580, 627–629 (2009–2010)
- The Avengers Annual #18 (1989)
- Avengers Finale #1 (2005)
- Captain America vol. 3 #18 (1999)
- Captain America vol. 4 #17–20 (2003–2004)
- Captain America vol. 5 #10 (2005)
- Captain Marvel vol. 6 #1–5 (2008)
- Civil War: Front Line #3–9 (2006)
- D.P. 7 Annual #1 (1987)
- Daredevil #284–285, 287–288, 291–295, 297–300, 380 (1990–1998)
- Daredevil vol. 2 #94 (2007)
- Daredevil: Dark Nights #1–3 (2013)
- The Destroyer #1, 3, 5, 8 (1989–1990)
- The Destroyer vol. 2 #1 (1991)
- Doctor Strange, Sorcerer Supreme #21–23 (1990)
- Fantastic Four: A Death in the Family #1 (2006)
- Gambit #1–4 (1993–1994)
- Ghost Rider/Captain America: Fear #1 (1992)
- Giant-Size Invaders #2 (2006)
- G.I. Joe: A Real American Hero #107 (1990)
- Hulk 1999 #1 (1999)
- The Incredible Hulk vol. 3 #40–43, 77–81 (2002–2005)
- Iron Age #1 (2011)
- Justice #15–23, 25–27, 29–31 (1988–1989)
- Marvel Comics Presents vol. 2 #11 (2008)
- The Mighty Avengers #20 (2009)
- Official Handbook of the Marvel Universe Deluxe Edition #17 (1987)
- Peter Parker: Spider-Man vol. 2 #13 (2000)
- Secret Invasion: Who Do You Trust #1 (2008)
- The Sensational Spider-Man vol. 2 #38 (2007)
- Shadows & Light #2 (1998)
- Solo Avengers #10 (Doctor Druid) (1988)
- Spider-Man #34 (1993)
- Spider-Man's Tangled Web #7–9 (2001–2002)
- Spider-Man: Death and Destiny #1–3 (2000–2001)
- Spider-Man: The Mysterio Manifesto #1–3 (2001)
- Stan Lee Meets the Thing #1 (2006)
- Thor vol. 2 #15 (1999)
- Uncanny X-Men #314 (1994)
- What The--?! #11 (1991)
- Wild Cards #2 (1990)
- Winter Soldier: Winter Kills #1 (2007)
- Wolverine/Punisher #1–5 (2004)
- X-Man #9 (1995)
- X-Men: The Magneto War #1 (1999)

Preceded by Dave Hoover	Justice penciller 1988–1989	Succeeded by Alan Kupperberg
Preceded by Mark Bagley	Daredevil penciller 1990–1992	Succeeded by M.C. Wyman
Preceded by John Romita Jr.	The Incredible Hulk penciller 2002	Succeeded by Stuart Immonen
Preceded by Doug Braithwaite	The Incredible Hulk penciller 2005	Succeeded by Jae Lee
