= Idaho Comics Group =

American independent comic book publishing company

- Founded: 2014
- Founder: Albert Asker
- Country of origin: U.S.
- Headquarters location: Boise, Idaho
- Key people: Gaz Asker
- Publication types: Comics
- Nonfiction topics: History, Autobiography
- Fiction genres: Adventure, Humor

Idaho Comics Group (ICG) is an independent comic book publishing company from Boise, Idaho, that was founded in 2014 by Albert Frank Asker. ICG is known for publishing the officially licensed Tarzan and the Comics of Idaho and Idaho Comics. The comics anthologies brought attention to comic book writers and artists from the state of Idaho; sales from Tarzan and the Comics of Idaho benefited the Boise Public Library.

Copies of the comic books produced by Idaho Comics Group can be found in the Idaho Reference section on the third floor of the Boise Public Library and in the Special Collections and Archives at the Boise State University Library.

== Overview ==
Idaho Comics Group has been featured in a Comic Book Resources article. The Tarzan and the Comics of Idaho anthologies, published in 2014, 2015, and 2016, feature Tarzan stories by writers and artists from the state of Idaho. (Tarzan creator Edgar Rice Burroughs lived in Idaho during three different periods in his life.)

The companion piece Idaho Comics, published in 2014 and 2015, featured articles on the history of comic books in Idaho that expand on subjects touched on in the Tarzan and the Comics of Idaho introductions. Articles in the Idaho Comics comics also bring attention to autobiographical comics writer Dennis P. Eichhorn and his contributions to sequential art in Idaho.

Notable creators associated with Idaho Comics Group include Albert Asker, Gaz Asker, Todd Clark, Dame Darcy, Dennis Eichhorn, Randall Kirby, Scott Pentzer, and Charles Soule.

== History ==
On August 30, 2014, Idaho Comics Group made its debut at the 2nd Annual Boise Public Library Comic Con with their two offerings: Tarzan and the Comics of Idaho #1 and Idaho Comics #1.

On October 6, 2015, The Best American Comics 2015 was released, and Idaho Comics Group contributors Dennis P. Eichhorn's Real Good Stuff #s 1–2 and Dame Darcy's "Voyage of the Temptress" were named to the list of "Notable Comics" published from September 1, 2013, to August 31, 2014, by series editor Bill Kartalopoulos. (Dame Darcy's "Voyage of the Temptress" made its print debut in Tarzan and the Comics of Idaho #1.)

The following year The Best American Comics 2016 named Dennis Eichhorn's Extra Good Stuff as one of that year's Notable Comics. The Best American Comics made it to #1 on the New York Times Best Sellers 2016 list for Graphic Novels.

On August 27, 2015, ICG comic books were featured in a library exhibition at Boise State University. On October 7, 2015, ICG publisher Al Asker gave a talk on the History of Comic Books in Idaho at Boise State University.

On October 13, 2015, ICG publisher Albert Asker remembered his late friend Dennis Eichhorn in a video produced by The Idaho Statesman.

On July 31, 2024, Screen Rant wrote an article about Joe Quesada's new Amazing Comics imprint and mentioned Idaho Comics Group as the first comic book publisher in Idaho.

On August 24th, 2024, the Boise Public Library published its inaugural issue of Boise Comic Arts Festival Presents which featured an article on the history of comic books in Idaho written by ICG founder Albert Frank Asker.

Idaho Comics Group founder Albert Frank Asker edited a story entitled "Aztlantis Attacks!" by Mexican comic book creators Baltazar Cardenas (writer), Rocío Pérez (artist), and Rodo Farías (colors) which will appear in Tomorrow Girl #6 (due out August 21st, 2024, from Antarctic Press).

Idaho Comics Group founder Albert Frank Asker wrote/contributed to a couple of stories in Tomorrow Girl Vol. 3: Fight For Justice from Antarctic Press which was released at the end of August of 2024. This book had four different covers.

Idaho Comics Group founder Albert Frank Asker wrote/contributed to a couple of stories in Tomorrow Girl #7 which was released on October 17, 2024 by Antarctic Press

Idaho Comics Group founder Albert Asker co-wrote Luchadora! This is the main story in Tomorrow Girl #11 which will be released on March 26th, 2025 by Antarctic Press. Tomorrow Girl #11 was also mentioned in Bleeding Cool News. Tomorrow Girl #11 will also be available for purchase in Sweden and the United Kingdom. The release date for Tomorrow Girl #11 was later pushed back to April 9th, 2025. Tomorrow Girl #11 was featured in a write-up by the biggest comic book magazine/internet news website in Mexico/Central America/South America: Comikaze.

Idaho Comics Group founder Albert Frank Asker co-wrote a story in Tomorrow Girl Vol. 4: Flight To The Future from Antarctic Press which was released at the end of June of 2025. This book had three different covers.

ICG founder Albert Asker wrote a story that appeared in YEET Presents #68 by Cost of Paper Comics out of Detroit, Michigan which was released in October, 2025. YEET Presents #68 also featured work by Dave Sim, William Messner-Loebs, Michael T. Gilbert, Mike Royer, Mike Gustovich, and others. Dave Sim and Mike Royer were inducted into the San Diego Comic Con's Will Eisner Awards Hall of Fame in 2026.

By the end of 2025 Albert Asker had stories published by Idaho Comics Group, Mystery House Comics, The Boise Public Library, Antarctic Press, and Cost Of Paper Comics.

On January 14th, 2026 Ninja High School #200 was released by Antarctic Press. The story features an intergalactic comic con and the covers to Tarzan and the Comics of Idaho #1 and Idaho Comics #2 can be seen in the bottom panel of page 4.

On May 6th, 2026 Tomorrow Girl #18 was released by Antarctic Press. ICG found Albert Asker co-wrote the back-up story for that issue featuring SuperMango entitled "Fruit Punch!" Tomorrow Girl #18 was reviewed by Graham Crackers Comics, the largest comic book shop franchise in the U.S., and earned 8 out of 10 Grahams.

== Titles ==
=== Tarzan and the Comics of Idaho (2014–present) ===
==== Issue #1 (2014) ====
Features work from the following Idaho writers and artists:

- Charles Soule (Superman/Wonder Woman, The Death of Wolverine, She-Hulk, Swamp Thing) (Note: Charles Soule is not actually from Idaho. He wrote a story illustrated by Boisean Allen Gladfelter.)
- Dennis Eichhorn (Real Stuff, Weirdo, Will Eisner's The Spirit: The New Adventures)
- Todd Clark (the nationally syndicated comic strip Lola)
- Steve Moore (the nationally syndicated comic strip In The Bleachers)
- Dame Darcy (Meat Cake)
- Allen Gladfelter (Disney's/Pixar's Cars, Occupy Comics)
- Steve Willhite (FUBAR, Jesus Hates Zombies)
- Scott Pentzer (Rose & Gunn, Sade, Rock 'n' Roll Comics)
- Randall Kirby (BOP! Comics)
- Jim Sumii (Tura and Eva)
- Julia Green (Mystic Pets)
- Adam Rosenlund (Light Years Away) COVER ARTIST
- Jon Keithley (Shivertown, 6x6)
- Shanae LaVelle (Shivertown, 6x6)
- Gaz Asker (Idaho Comics)
- Albert Frank Asker (Idaho Comics, 6x6)

==== Issue #2 (2015) ====
Features work from the following writers and artists:

- Monte Michael Moore (painted covers for DC Comics and Marvel Comics) COVER ARTIST
- Bill Schelly (Alter Ego magazine, The Eye, Fandom's Finest Comics)
- Dennis Eichhorn (Real Good Stuff, Extra Good Stuff)
- Todd Clark (Lola)
- Randall Kirby (BOP! Comics, Anything That Loves)
- Scott Pentzer (Sports Superstars, Rock 'N' Roll Comics, Rose & Gunn, Sade)
- Adrianne Presnell (6x6)
- Steve Willhite (FUBAR, Jesus Hates Zombies, Mother Russia)
- Peter Lawson (Border Town Comic Con)
- Dick Trageser (Fandom's Finest Comics)
- John Barrie (TATCOI #2)
- Michelle Estrada (TATCOI #2)
- Jay O'Leary (Push)
- Bob Beason (Captain Bengal)
- Geoffery C. Everts (Disney cartoons animator, Jethro's Rad Euro-Zine 2.0)
- Jake Scholl (Blade of the Broken)
- Bethany Schultz Hurst (award-winning poet of Miss Lost Nation, English professor at Idaho State University)
- Gaz Asker (Tarzan and the Comics of Idaho #1, Idaho Comics #1)
- Albert Frank Asker (Tarzan and the Comics of Idaho #1, Idaho Comics #1, 6x6)

==== Issue #3 (2016) ====
Features work from the following writers and artists:

- Ward P. Hooper (Mayor's Art Award, 2005; Best Idaho Visual Artist, 2007 and 2012) COVER ARTIST
- James Lloyd (Art Director of the Treefort Music Fest, Mystic Pets, Cowboy Comics)
- Dennis Eichhorn (Real Stuff, Real Good Stuff, Extra Good Stuff, The Adventures of Ace International)
- Jacob Bear (Hawk and Dove, Batbear, Deadpooh)
- Randall Kirby (BOP Comics)
- Joseph Bradshaw (Kingdom of Freedom)
- Treycen Fluckiger (Why Not?)
- James Lichtenberg (Why Not?)
- Hector Diaz (Art Director for Nampa's Dia En Downtown)
- Scott Pentzer (Sports Superstars, Rock 'N' Roll Comics, Rose & Gunn, Sade)
- Damon Bradshaw (Push)
- Gaz Asker (Art Director, Idaho Comics Group)
- Albert Frank Asker (Editor-In-Chief, Idaho Comics Group)

The back cover features a few kind words from Pulitzer Prize-winning author Anthony Doerr. The full letter from Anthony Doerr to Idaho Comics Group was published in the interior of issue #3. Only 4 Pulitzer Prize winners have only had their work appear in comic books/graphic novels: Art Spiegelman in Maus (1992), Michael Chabon in JSA All-Stars #7 (2004) & The Escapist #1 and #7 (2005), Tessa Hulls in Feeding Ghosts (2025), and Anthony Doerr in Tarzan and the Comics of Idaho #3.

=== Idaho Doujinshi Mixtape (2025–present) ===
==== Issue #4 (2025) ====
(アイダホ州 同人誌 ミックステープ) This comic book made its premiere at the 2025 Boise Comic Arts Festival (August 30th, 2025). This book was released to commemorate Albert Asker's presentation on Japanese Doujinshi And Other Modern Bootleg Comic Books at the BCAF. It featured an article on Japanese Doujinshi and Other Modern Bootleg Comic Books, a 6 page doujinshi featuring Machine Man and Krypto, the Super Dog, a bunch of short stories, a new Justice Guy story (1st appearance since Tarzan and the Comics of Idaho #3), a letter from Steve Ditko to Albert Asker, and an article and photo of some never before published Dave Stevens artwork painted on the wall of a fan's house in Boise. The following characters made their 1st appearance in this book: Dr. Shane Wheeler, Barbara Wheeler, Dr. Bakhargül Seytliev, Lil' Gooser, Dêqên Paljor, Detective Constable Malcolm Carmicheal, Janet Carmicheal, Ross Padgett, Brenda Montross, William Atkins, Sarah Browne, Achilles Pico, @fterB.U.R.N.E.R, The Phantoglyphs, Nigel Tavers, Jean-Luc Mbah a Moute, and The Hole. It also featured work by:

- Albert Asker (Tomorrow Girl, Tarzan and the Comics of Idaho, YEET Presents)
- Damon Bradshaw (Tarzan and the Comics of Idaho, Idaho Comics)
- Fco Jassiel (Tomorrow Girl, Fur Fighters)
- Professor ? (Art Director for Idaho Comics Group) COVER ARTIST

=== Idaho Comics (2014–present) ===
==== Issue #1 (2014) ====
Features an article on the history of comic books in Idaho with a special emphasis on Edgar Rice Burroughs and his time in Idaho working as a cowboy/adventurer, ranch hand, photography and stationery store owner, gold prosecutor, and city councilman in Parma, Idaho. Also features an autobiographical story by Dennis Eichhorn about the time Lyle Smith recruited him to play football at Boise Junior College (now Boise State University).

Idaho Comics #1 features work by:

- Dennis Eichhorn
- Albert Frank Asker COVER ARTIST and also two stories that Asker submitted to Piranha Press when he was thirteen years old.
- Gaz Asker COVER ARTIST and also comic strips by the Idaho Comics Group art director

==== Issue #2 (2015) ====
Features a brand new autobiographical story by Dennis Eichhorn about the time he was investigated by the Salt Lake City Police Department over a comic book he published in Moscow, Idaho, in 1974; as well as two other autobiographical stories by Eichhorn. Features a continuation on the article on the history of comic books in Idaho — again with special emphasis on Edgar Rice Burroughs and the comic books published in Idaho based on his characters.

Idaho Comics #2 Features work by:

- Albert Frank Asker
- Gaz Asker
- Reilly S. Clark
- Damon Bradshaw COVER ARTIST
- Dennis Eichhorn
- Scott Fife
- Jim Loney
- Jim Sumii
- Seth Tobocman
- Mark Zingarelli

=== Idaho Comics (Jr.) (2015–present) ===
==== Issue #3 (2025) ====
An 8 page mini comic that made its debut at the 2025 Boise Comic Arts Festival. Featured a comic strip by Gibran Saleh and Albert Asker that was originally published in Boise State University's student newspaper, The Arbiter, on March 1st, 1995. It featured work by:

- Albert Asker COVER ARTIST
- Gibran Saleh

== Podcast: Idaho Comics with Albert Asker ==
The Idaho Comics with Albert Asker podcasts serve as a compendium piece to the Idaho Comics Group comic books, adding depth and breadth to the subjects touched on in the "History of Comic Books in Idaho" articles. Each month Asker interviews a person with ties to comic books in Idaho. Episodes of Idaho Comics with Albert Asker can be found on iTunes, SoundCloud, and Stitcher. (There is another podcast coming from this group, called The Idaho Comics Group Sports Report and Podcast.)

- Episode One (October 2016): "Idaho Comics News" (Pilot)
- Episode Two (November 2016): Randall Kirby
- Episode Three (December 2016): Steve Willhite
- Episode Four (January 2017): Josh Shapel
- Episode Five (February 2017): Catherine Kyle
- Episode Six (March 2017): Adam Rosenlund
- Episode Seven (April 2017): Jacob Bear and Dan Feldmeier
- Episode Eight (May 2017): Terry Blas
- Episode Nine (June 2017): Shanae Lavelle
- Episode Ten (July 2017): Scott Pentzer
- Episode Eleven (August 2017): Ethan Ede
- Episode Twelve (September 2017): Erica Crockett
- Episode Thirteen (April 2018): Brian Douglas Ahern and Randall Kirby
- Episode Fourteen (June 2018): Julia Green
- Episode Fifteen (July 2018): James W.A.R. Lloyd
- Episode Sixteen (July 2018): BONUS! Wizard World Comic Con Boise 2018 Review
- Episode Seventeen (August 2018): The Dennis Eichhorn Project Part I
- Episode Eighteen (September 2018): The Dennis Eichhorn Project Part II
- Episode Nineteen (December 2018): CF Arik Grant
- Episode Twenty (April 2019): Ron Randall
