= Abstract comics =

Comics with visual abstraction and traditional comic style

Abstract comics are comics that combine concepts of visual abstraction with the traditional continuity of the comic strip.

A collection of abstract comics was brought together in the book Abstract Comics: The Anthology edited by Andrei Molotiu. The Danish publisher Fahrenheit published Nautilus by Molotiu and Reykjavik by Henrik Rehr, both abstract graphic novels, in 2009. Creators of abstract comics included in Molotiu's anthology include Robert Crumb, Andrei Molotiu, Patrick McDonnell, Mark Badger, Henrik Rehr, Benoit Joly, Ibn Al Rabin (nom de plume of Mathieu Bailif), Mark Staff Brandl, and Gary Panter.

== See also ==
- Abstract art
- Alternative comics
