= Starhead Comix =

Comics publisher

- Industry: Minicomics, comics
- Genre: Alternative, underground
- Founded: 1984; 42 years ago
- Founder: Michael Dowers
- Defunct: 1999; 27 years ago
- Successor: Brownfield Press
- Headquarters: Seattle, Washington, United States

Starhead Comix was an alternative/underground comics publisher that operated from 1984 to c. 1999. Founded by Michael Dowers, Starhead was based in Seattle, Washington. Mostly known for limited-edition minicomics, Starhead also published standard-sized, black-and-white comics in the early 1990s.

Creators associated with Starhead included Dennis Eichhorn, Ellen Forney, Roberta Gregory, David Lasky, Pat Moriarity, Art Penn, Ed "Big Daddy" Roth, J. R. Williams, Steve Willis, and Dennis Worden.

== History ==
Self-described "hippie" Michael Dowers discovered minicomics in 1982 and was immediately enthralled by the form. He began writing, drawing, printing, copying, and distributing his own mini comics (under the name Nessie Productions), and by 1984 formed Starhead Comix to publish his work and that of fellow cartoonists, including Ronald Roach, Steve Willis and J. R. Williams.

In the late 1980s, Starhead experimented with standard format comics, and from 1991–1995 the company focused almost exclusively on this form, often publishing Pacific Northwest-based creators like Dennis P. Eichhorn, Forney, Gregory, Lasky, Colin Upton, and J. R. Williams.

The company's last few years were limited to publishing reprints and updates of the pornographic Tijuana Bibles from the 1930s.

In 1999, publisher Dowers retired the Starhead Comix name and created Brownfield Press to sell remaining titles and occasionally publish new projects.

In 2010, Fantagraphics Books published Newave!: The Underground Mini Comix of the 1980s, a nearly 900-page collection of minicomics (many of which originally saw print via Starhead), edited by Dowers. This was followed in 2013 by Dowers' Treasury of Mini Comics — Volume One, also published by Fantagraphics (ISBN 978-1606996577).

== Titles (selected) ==
=== Minicomics ===
- 3R Cosmix (8 issues, 1984–1986) — Ronald Roach
- Skinboy Fights Back (1984) ---- J. R. Williams
- Armageddonquest (1984–1986) — Ronald Roach; followed by a full-size comics series in 1994
- Exquisite Corpse Comix (1985–1990) — anthology
- Morty the Dog (2 issues, 1987) — Steve Willis
- Outside In (7 issues, 1984–1985) — numbering continued from self-published Steve Willis title
- Seattle Star (1985–1990) — newsprint tabloid-size
- Starhead Presents (3 issues, 1987) — anthology

=== Comics ===
- Amazing Adventures of Ace International (1 issue, 1993) — Dennis Eichhorn
- Armageddonquest (3 issues, 1994) — Ronald Roach
- Artistic Licentiousness (3 issues, 1991–1994) — Roberta Gregory
- Bezango Obscuro (1 issue, 1994) — Steve Willis
- Big Black Thing (1 issue, 1994) — Colin Upton
- Big Mouth (2 issues, 1992–1993) — Pat Moriarity
- Bumber Comix (2 issues, 1985–1988) — second issue published with a grant from the Bumbershoot Arts Festival
- Cruel and Unusual Punishment (2 issues, 1993–1994)
- Fun House (1 issue, 1993) — J. R. Williams
- Hemp for Victory (1 issue, 1995)
- The Mutant Book of the Dead (1 issue, 1994) — Mack White
- Northwest Cartoon Cookery (1 issue, 1995) - edited by Dennis Eichhorn
- Rat Fink Comix (1 issue, 1987) — Ed "Big Daddy" Roth
- Real Schmuck (1 issue, 1993) — Dennis Eichhorn
- Seattle Sketchbook (1 issue, 1995) — David Collier
- Stickboy (2 issues, 1993–1995)— Dennis Worden; numbering continues from Fantagraphics Books/Revolutionary Comics title
- The Tijuana Bible (9 issues, 1994–1998) — reprints of stories from the 1930s
- Tomato (2 issues, 1994–1995) — Ellen Forney
