= J. R. Williams (comics) =

American alternative cartoonist

- Born: James Robert Williams; 1957 (age 68–69)
- Areas: Cartoonist, Animator, Fine Artist
- Notable works: Skinboy; Crap

J. R. Williams (born 1957) is an American cartoonist, animator, and fine artist best known for his late 1980s/early 1990s work in alternative comics. Known for his manic, exaggerated cartooning style, Williams brought an underground comix edge to his work during this period. Williams' characters Skinboy and the Bad Boys made recurring appearances in many of his stories.

== Biography ==
Williams grew up in Oregon during the 1960s, and in the 1970s studied fine art at the Oregon College of Education (now known as Western Oregon University). Comics influences included Dr. Seuss, Don Martin, and Basil Wolverton.

Williams' first professional comics work was in the Last Gasp anthology Weirdo in the mid-1980s, during the period it was edited by Peter Bagge. He soon was also contributing to the Fantagraphics Books anthologies Centrifugal Bumble-Puppy (edited by Joe Sacco) and Honk!.

From 1990 to 1995, Williams released a string of solo one-shot comics — with titles like Bad Comics, Bummer, Completely Bad Boys, Damnation, and Fun House — released by such publishers as Fantagraphics, Cat-Head Comics, and Starhead Comix. Williams' solo title Crap ran seven issues with Fantagraphics from 1993 to 1995.

Williams lived in Seattle from 1992 to 1995 (for a short time staying with Peter Bagge and his wife), before returning to Portland.

In 1995, after writing the three-issue comic book adaptation of The Little Shop of Horrors for Roger Corman's short-lived comics imprint Roger Corman's Cosmic Comics, Williams mostly disappeared from the comics scene.

He worked as an animator, designer, and storyboard artist for Will Vinton Studios from 1988 to 2001, contributing to such series as The PJs, Gary & Mike, The California Raisins, and Adventures in Wonderland.

From 1995 to 2000, Williams contributed artwork and some writing to Cool and Strange Music magazine.

In the 2000s, Williams returned to his fine arts roots, painting multiple series of abstract, geometric paintings. In the late 2000s, his fine art returned to figurative work, combining elements of 1960s comics with painting techniques.

Williams lives in Portland, Oregon.

== Bibliography ==
=== Solo titles ===
- Bad Comics (Cat-Head Comics, 1990)
- Bummer (Cat-Head Comics, 1992; Fantagraphics Books, 1995)
- Completely Bad Boys (Fantagraphics Books, 1992)
- Crap (7 issues, Fantagraphics, 1993–1995)
- Damnation (Fantagraphics, May 1994)
- Fun House (Starhead Comix, 1993)
