= Superman: Lois and Clark =

2015–16 DC Comics limited series

- Superman: Lois and Clark #1, art by Lee Weeks.

Publication information
- Publisher: DC Comics
- Format: Limited series
- Genre: Superhero
- Publication date: October 2015 – May 2016
- No. of issues: 8
- Main character(s): Superman/Clark Kent; Lois Lane; Jon Kent

Creative team
- Written by: Dan Jurgens
- Penciller(s): Lee Weeks; Neil Edwares; Stephen Segovia

Collected editions
- Superman: Lois and Clark: ISBN 978-1401262495

Superman: Lois and Clark is an eight-issue comic book limited series published by DC Comics, written by Dan Jurgens and art by Lee Weeks. The series is notable for the reintroduction of the post-Crisis Superman and Lois Lane, in DC continuity after DC erased the characters in the 2011 New 52 relaunch. The series follows the life and adventures of Superman/Clark Kent, his wife Lois Lane, and their son Jon Kent, as they face new challenges living in the New 52 universe.

== Publication history ==
DC Comics announced the comic book series Superman: Lois and Clark in July 2015. Released in October 2015 to May 2016, the series is a spin-off from DC's Convergence event, which featured various DC characters and timelines, including a post-Crisis Superman and his pregnant wife, Lois Lane. It is set approximately nine years after the Convergence event, where Superman and his family are living in the New 52 universe.

DC Comics had decided to restore the Superman character to a more familiar and recognisable state and approached veteran Superman writer/artist Dan Jurgens with the idea. Jurgens wrote the miniseries Convergence: Superman and reintroduced the post-Crisis married Superman and Lois Lane, and gave the couple a child in DC canon, before working on the Superman: Lois and Clark series with artist Lee Weeks following Convergence. The series was designed to give Superman and his family some context and backstory before their eventual transition into the main Superman comic books in DC's Rebirth relaunch.

On Superman and his family's transition into the main DC Universe, Jurgens said: "Going all the way back to "Convergence," we knew that Jon was going to survive to make it into the DCU. There were a lot of different ideas about how to do it and what might work best, but we knew that one way or another, we'd have him long term. After that, we started to pull together the Superman: Lois & Clark series. From the beginning, we knew they'd survive to become the principal versions of the current versions, though the exact methodology had not yet been determined. But the broad ideas were in place, and it's been a pleasure to see it work out as well as it has."

== Background ==
In 1986, the DC Universe went through a revamp with the Crisis on Infinite Earths, and DC Comics released John Byrne's six-issue limited series The Man of Steel. The series detailed Superman's origin story in the Modern Age comics, significantly rewriting the Superman origin and reintroduced the Superman/Clark Kent character; Clark Kent is now the real person and Superman is the disguise. Over the next two and a half decades, this Superman developed a rich history including Lois and Clark becoming a couple and getting married in the comic book special Superman: The Wedding Album, which became the status quo in DC Comics.

In 2011, DC Comics relaunched its entire line of comic book titles and rebooted its continuity with the New 52, erasing all the DC history that has developed in the past 25 years. The publisher re-imagined its DC characters and their history. Superman became younger, less experienced and has only been a superhero for five years. Both of his adoptive parents Jonathan and Martha Kent died when he was a teenager. He has no existing romantic relationship with Lois; she is unaware that Clark is Superman and only view him as a friend and colleague.

The 2015 Convergence event, featured many DC characters and timelines from before the "Flashpoint" storyline that led to the creation of the New 52 universe, including characters from the "post-Crisis" (characters and stories that appeared in DC Comics after Crisis on Infinite Earths and before the New 52). The event marks the return of the post-Crisis Superman and his wife Lois Lane, after being erased in the 2011 reboot. After Convergence, the couple along with their son, Jonathan (born in the two-part miniseries Convergence: Superman #2) appeared in the comic book series Superman: Lois and Clark.

In 2016, DC once again relaunched its entire comic book lines with DC Rebirth. The publisher aims to restore the company's legacy and reintroducing elements lost in the New 52 reboot, and characters were revised. DC killed off the New 52 Superman and replaced him with the post-Crisis Superman, along with his wife and son, creating a new status quo in DC continuity. DC Comics further establishes Superman's status quo and the DC Universe in the four part story Superman Reborn.

== Story ==
At the end of the Convergence event, Barry Allen, Supergirl, Parallax, Superman and Lois and their baby boy, Jonathan, travel to the past to prevent the Anti-Monitor from starting the Convergence. Their efforts are successful, and the multiverse is reborn. Superman and Lois choose to stay on the new primary Earth, arriving at the beginning of the New 52, and settle into a house in the country. Superman is apprehensive about this new world and how different it is from their own. They will have to adapt to this world together as a family.

Clark and Lois with their son in Superman: Lois and Clark #2

Many years pass: Jon has grown, the family is living in California and has adopted new identities, taking the surname "White" (a tribute to Perry White). They keep a low profile and stay out of the lives of this world's superheroes. Superman continues his superhero duty quietly behind the scenes protecting the world without being seen and taking precautions to ensure no one discovers him and endangers his family. Lois has become an anonymous author, publishing several books under the alias "Author X", her books have helped uncover many criminal activities. Jon is unaware of his parents' secret activities and their real identities.

While Jon gets ready for school, Clark returns home after stopping a natural disaster. His powers have been in flux, but he can still get the job done. After Lois and Jon leave for school, Clark puts on his black Superman suit (an anniversary present from Lois many years early) and flies off to save the Excalibur Space Shuttle, piloted by Hank Henshaw, the future Cyborg Superman. If he can save the Shuttle, he can prevent Henshaw from becoming Cyborg Superman. When a military team investigates the Excalibur crash site, they wonder why the Shuttle did not burn up on reentry, and a satellite photo reveals a humanoid shape steering the Excalibur shuttle. Meanwhile, in an alley in the city, Lois gives her contact, Cora, a flash drive containing her investigation on the criminal group Intergang. Lois and Jon's car is attacked by gunmen while driving home from school, Lois phones Clark about the attack. Clark easily defeats and disarm the men. After returning home, they conclude that Intergang was behind the attack, and must have followed Lois after her meeting with Cora.

The next day, Superman arrives at the new Fortress of Solitude in the mountains, where he has taken Henshaw for medical attention after saving him from the Excalibur shuttle. Henshaw's vitals are erratic; Superman attempts to talk to Henshaw, who suddenly awakens and attacks him. Blanque, a psychic killer who Superman imprisoned in the Fortress many years early after he devastated an entire town with his psychic abilities, has taken control of Henshaw, and uses him to attack Superman, burying him under the walls. Blanque summons Henshaw to the Fortress' detention block to free him. Blanque says he had seen Superman's mind and knows there are two people close to his heart; a woman and a child, he intends to pay them a visit. Elsewhere, Lois and Jon arrive in the city to make sure Lois' friend Cora is safe. Lois finds a note in Cora's office saying that Intergang has kidnapped her.

At the Fortress, Superman has recovered from Henshaw's assault and is searching for Blanque, who attacks him, throws him out of the mountain, and buries Superman beneath the mountain rocks. Blanque and Henshaw make their way to the control panel, where Blanque receives a call from Lois. Blanque delivers a threatening message to Lois, but Superman punches Blanque into the wall. Blanque takes control of a Khund war suit and attacks Superman. Henshaw, who has regained control of himself, attacks Blanque with an energy blast. Superman takes the opportunity to throw Blanque back into his prison cell. Later, Superman drops Henshaw at the island where the Excalibur crash-landed and asks him not to detail their encounter. As Superman leaves, Henshaw pulls out the Oblivion Stone which he used to blast Blanque. When Superman returns home Lois shows him the note she found in Cora's office. Although Clark says Intergang needs Cora alive, Lois is nervous that she and Jon were approached by Bruno Manheim (the head of the Intergang) on the street in the city. Clark and Lois consider that maybe it is time to reveal to Jon that his father is Superman.

Superman and Lois work together to find Cora. Lois calls Cora's phone while Superman uses his super hearing to identify the phone's location. Superman finds Cora in a cabin in San Francisco, and frees her, but Cora has already revealed Author X's identity to Intergang. Soon after, when Lois and her son Jon leave school, they are captured by the Intergang people. The men tie up Lois and Jon in the tool shed and set it on fire. This causes Jon's powers to emerge and, breaking free of his bonds, he opens the door through the flames. Lois realizes Jon has superpowers. They are surrounded by Intergang's men, after escaping the shed. Superman arrives in time to disarm the men and flies Lois and Jon away. When they arrive home, Lois tells Clark that Jon has superpowers. Jon wants answers from his parents and is finally learning his parents' true origin. Clark and Lois explain to Jon that they come from an alternate universe, a universe different from this one. Their universe is gone, and this one is their home now, and the Superman and Lois he reads about in the newspapers are different people and part of this world. Jon asks why they lied to him; Clark explains they wanted to protect him and did not know if Jon would develop superpowers.

Superman receives a vision of people being attacked by an alien Conqueror and flies to a government facility on an island where Hyathis is attacking Hank Henshaw and others. Hyathis wants Henshaw to give her the Oblivion Stone, but he only has half of the stone. She demands Superman to hand over the other half of the Oblivion Stone (found by Superman and stored in the Fortress of Solitude). Superman has no idea what the Oblivion Stone is, but remembers a necklace with a partial jewel found years ago. Superman and Hyathis are locked in deadly combat. Hyathis uses plants and vines to pin Superman to the ground, but Superman frees himself and pushes her back with a blast of heat vision. Superman gains the upper hand, and Hyathis is forced to withdraw. She promises to return to Earth for the stone.

Jon with his parents in Superman: Lois and Clark #8

Back at home, Jon cannot believe his father is a superhero and is reading about his adventures in the newspapers; saving people and preventing disasters. Inspired by his father's heroism, Jon attempts to fly, only to fall to the ground. Lois tells Jon to wait until his powers are properly developed. Clark is reunited with his family when he returns home. Lois tells Clark that the authorities have had an advance look at her book and are making widespread arrests; Intergang is finished. Jon cannot believe his life has changed so much in the past few days. Clark and Lois take him to the basement, where they keep a chest filled with things from their own world. One of the things is Superman's old costume. Clark gives Jon the Superman cape, and he attempts to fly with success. Jon has made his first flight and his parents watch with pride. Lois tells Jon "I always knew you were my little Superboy."

== Collected editions ==
Title	Material collected	Publication date	Pages	ISBN	Ref
Superman: Lois and Clark	#1-8	August 31, 2016	168	978-1401262495	
