= Tarzan vs. Predator: At the Earth's Core =

Four-issue comic book crossover limited series

Publication information
- Publisher: Dark Horse Comics
- Schedule: Monthly
- Format: Limited series
- Genre: Science fiction
- Publication date: January – June 1996
- No. of issues: 4
- Main character(s): Predator; Tarzan

Creative team
- Written by: Walter Simonson
- Artist: Lee Weeks
- Inker: Lee Weeks
- Letterer(s): Pat Brosseau (#1); Vickie Williams (#2-4)
- Colorist: Perry McNamee
- Editor(s): Peet Janes; Mike Richardson

Collected editions
- TPB: ISBN 156971231X

Tarzan vs. Predator: At the Earth's Core is a four-issue comic book crossover limited series that was first published by Dark Horse Comics from January to June 1996. It was written by Walter Simonson, illustrated and inked by Lee Weeks, colored by Perry McNamee, lettered by Pat Brosseau and Vickie Williams, and edited by Mike Richardson and Peet Janes, with cover art by Weeks.

== Plot ==
Tarzan winds up in a forest at the center of the Earth called Pellucidar. Seeing a group of Predators leave heaps of bodies in their wake, Tarzan wages war against them to avenge the dead.

== Collected editions ==
The series was collected into a trade paperback:

- Tarzan vs. Predator: At the Earth's Core (Dark Horse Comics, 117 pages, October 1997, ISBN 978-1569712313)

== See also ==
- Tarzan (comics)
- Predator (comics)
