= The Rocket (music magazine) =

Music magazine serving the Pacific Northwest

- Cover of the April 7–21, 1999 issue (#299), parodying the cover of Sub Pop 200
- Editor: Robert W. McChesney (1979-1983)
- Editor: Charles R. Cross (1986-2000)
- Categories: Rock music
- Frequency: Monthly (1979-1992); Biweekly (1992-2000)
- Founder: Robert W. McChesney
- Founded: 1979
- First issue: October 1, 1979; 46 years ago
- Final issue: October 18, 2000; 25 years ago
- Country: United States
- Based in: Seattle, Washington
- Language: English

The Rocket was a free biweekly music magazine serving the Pacific Northwest region of the United States, published from 1979 to 2000. The magazine's chief purpose was to document local music. This focus distinguished it from other area weeklies such as the Seattle Weekly and the Willamette Week, which reported more on local news and politics. Originally solely a Seattle-based magazine, a Portland, Oregon edition was introduced in 1991. In general, the two editions contained the same content, with some slight variations (i.e., different concert calendars) although occasionally they ran different cover stories.

== Publication history ==
Bob McChesney, the magazine's founder and publisher, had been active as a salesman for the Seattle Sun, a weekly alternative newspaper that competed with the Seattle Weekly. Frustrated by the paper’s refusal to cover Seattle’s then-burgeoning music-scene, the Sun’s arts editor, Robert Ferrigno, and art director, Bob Newman, started The Rocket as a free supplement to the Sun, with its first issue appearing in October 1979. By April of the following year, Ferrigno, Newman and McChesney raised enough money to produce the issues of The Rocket on their own. Ferrigno would edit the publication from 1979–1982. Published on a monthly schedule, during that period The Rocket had articles about such bands as Patti Smith, The Blackouts, The Enemy, and The Jitters, (led by PK Dwyer.) Publisher McChesney insisted that the newspaper also cover major label arena bands, and Ferrigno and his writing staff reluctantly agreed to do so, but only if they could “trash them” in the articles.

By January 1982, the magazine’s circulation had grown to 50,000 copies per month. The magazine managed to attract writers and cartoonists such as Jeff Christensen, Roberta Penn, Lynda Barry, John Keister, Wes Anderson, Peter Blecha, Charles R. Cross and Scott McCaughey. The editors and writers constantly attempted to cover only “fairly obscure alternative bands” in the local area, such as The Fartz, The Allies, The Heats/The Heaters, Visible Targets, Red Dress, and The Cowboys. Publisher McChesney continued to insist that “mainstream material” be given equal time.

In April 1982, Ferrigno quit the newspaper and Newman took over as editor. By the end of 1983, McChesney had also left for graduate school at the University of Washington; he would go on to become an important media scholar and critic. The Rocket continued to attract new writing talent, including Daina Darzin, Craig Tomashoff, Ann Powers, Jim Emerson, Gillian G. Gaar, Brent Lorang, Grant Alden, Peter Blecha, and Dennis Eichhorn. Matt Groening provided some cover art during this period. Bruce Pavitt began a monthly column called "Sub Pop U.S.A." devoted to the independent and underground music scene in Seattle and other parts of the U.S. Cover stars included The Young Fresh Fellows, who at the time of their Rocket feature had only performed live a dozen or so times. At the end of 1984, the newspaper printed a list of the “10 Hottest Northwest Bands”, which consisted of: Fastbacks, 54-40, D.O.A., Hosannah Choir, Girltalk, Ellipsis, Robert Cray Band, Metal Church, The Young Fresh Fellows, and The U-Men. In 1986, Cross became the paper’s editor and remained in that capacity until The Rocket’s demise. In the mid-1980s, heavy metal music developed a strong following in the Pacific Northwest, and the paper had cover stories on such bands as Slayer, Wild Dogs, Queensrÿche, and Metal Church. By 1988, that scene had pretty much faded, and The Rocket’s editorial focus shifted to covering the pre-grunge local alternative rock bands that were even then beginning to attract national attention. Long before any other publication took notice of them, Soundgarden and Nirvana became Rocket cover stars, with Soundgarden featuring on the October 1988 issue, and Nirvana on the December 1989 issue. In December 1989, The Rocket celebrated its tenth anniversary by hosting a “Nine for the 90’s” concert with a mix of what the paper felt were Seattle’s most promising new bands, including Love Battery, The Posies, High Performance Crew, The Walkabouts, The Young Fresh Fellows, and Alice in Chains.

In 1991, The Rocket introduced its Portland, Oregon edition, which generally simply mirrored the Seattle-version, with only the concert listing pages offering different contents. The following year, publication of the paper switched from monthly to bi-weekly frequency.

=== Final years ===
In 1995, Cross sold the paper to BAM Media, a San Francisco-based company that published several music-related publications. BAM utilized the profitable Rocket “to float its other papers” for years, which slowly drained The Rocket of its money while the other papers never managed to find their footing. In August 2000, BAM shut down all of its floundering projects and sold The Rocket to Dave Roberts, the publisher of Illinois Entertainer. Roberts reduced the size of the office, purchased some new computers for the staff, paid for a few promotions, and gave the appearance that he was seriously attempting to revitalize the publication.

However, only a few weeks later “almost everyone's paychecks bounced”, and Roberts abruptly advised the entire staff that the magazine was shutting down immediately. No explanation was provided to any of the staff members as to the reason for the publication’s closure. The Rocket’s final issue was dated October 18, 2000. According to The Seattle Times, during its final years The Rocket's readership was stronger than ever, with circulation having reached 55,000 copies in Seattle and 36,000 in Portland. After the magazine's demise Cross stated, "This was not about The Rocket not being read or respected or advertised in. It's just been poorly run the last few years."
