= Dan Jurgens =

American comics artist and writer (born 1959)

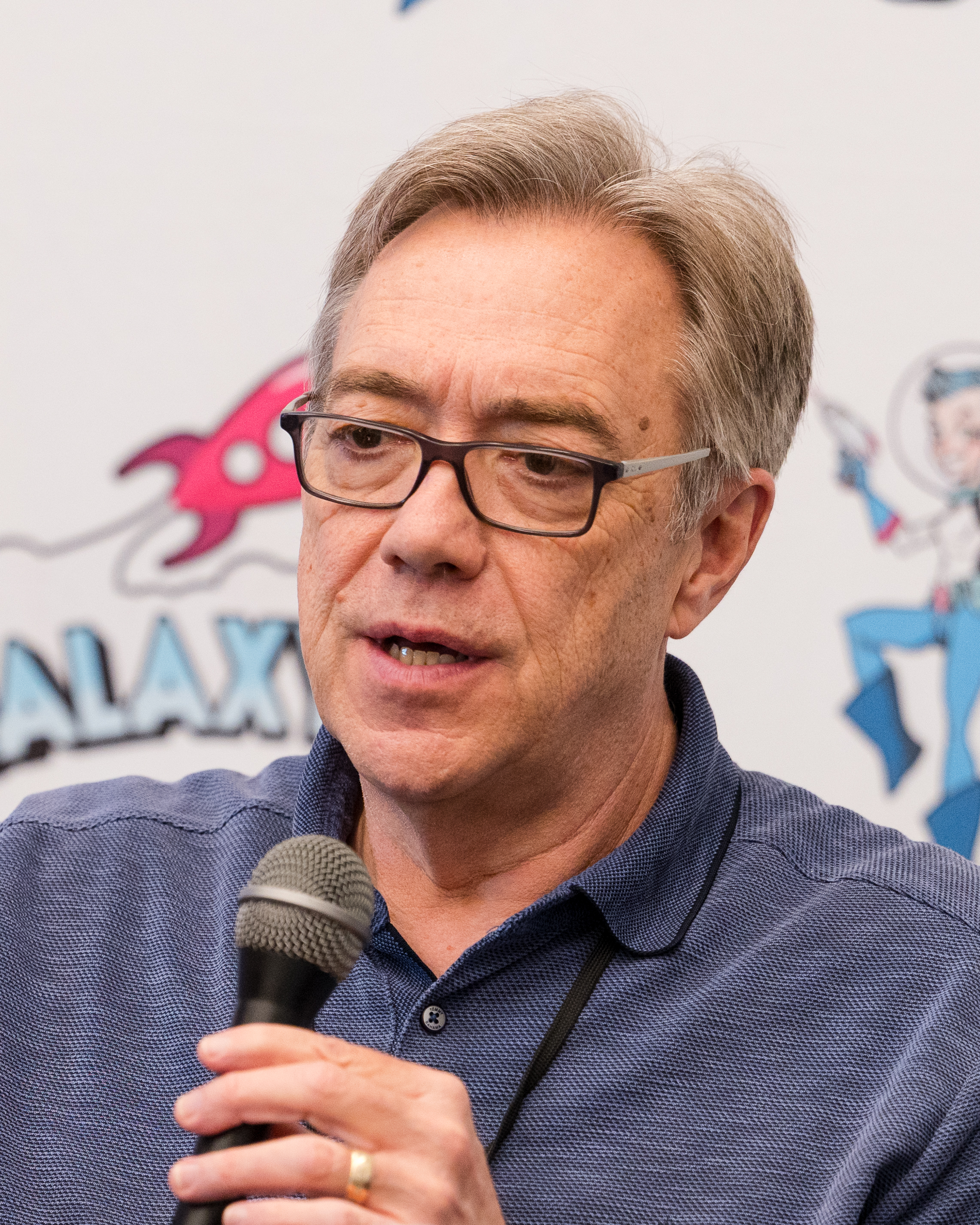
- Jurgens at GalaxyCon Oklahoma City in 2026
- Born: June 27, 1959 (age 67) Ortonville, Minnesota, U.S.
- Areas: Writer, Penciller, Inker
- Notable works: Action Comics; Batman Beyond; Booster Gold; Captain America; Superman; Tangent Comics; Thor; Warlord
- Children: 2

Dan Jurgens (/ˈdʒɜːrɡənz/; born June 27, 1959) is an American comic book writer and artist. He is known for his work on the DC comic book storyline "The Death of Superman" and for creating characters such as Doomsday, Hank Henshaw, Jon Kent, and Booster Gold. Jurgens had a lengthy run on the Superman comic books including The Adventures of Superman, Superman vol. 2 and Action Comics. At Marvel, Jurgens worked on series such as Captain America, The Sensational Spider-Man and was the writer on Thor for seven years. He also had a brief run as writer and artist on Solar for Valiant Comics in 1995.

== Career ==
=== 1980s ===
After graduating from Minneapolis College of Art and Design in 1981, Jurgens' first professional comic work was for DC Comics on The Warlord #63 (Nov. 1982). He was hired due to a recommendation of Warlord creator Mike Grell who was deeply impressed by Jurgens' work after being shown his private portfolio at a convention. In 1984, Jurgens was the artist for the Sun Devils limited series (July 1984 – June 1985), with writers Gerry Conway and Roy Thomas. Jurgens would make his debut as a comic book writer with Sun Devils. He began scripting from Conway's plots with #8 (Feb. 1985) and fully took over the writing duties on the title with #10 (April 1985). In 1985, Jurgens created the character Booster Gold, who became a member of the Justice League. Jurgens was one of the contributors to the DC Challenge limited series in 1986. His first work on Superman was as penciller for The Adventures of Superman Annual #1 (1987). In 1988, Jurgens provided pencil art for the Deadman short stories which were written by Mike Baron in the short-lived anthology Action Comics Weekly from issues #601–612. He then had a run as artist of Green Arrow with writer Mike Grell from 1988 to 1990. In 1989, Jurgens began working full-time on the Superman character when he took over the writing/pencilling of the monthly The Adventures of Superman.

=== 1990s ===
Jurgens was the penciller of the 1991 limited series Armageddon 2001 and co-created the hero Waverider with Archie Goodwin. Jurgens helped writer Louise Simonson and artist Jon Bogdanove launch a new Superman title, Superman: The Man of Steel in July 1991 and assumed the writing/pencilling of the main Superman comic book with issue No. 57 (July 1991). He created a supporting hero named Agent Liberty in issue No. 60 (Oct. 1991) and then worked on the "Panic in the Sky" crossover in 1992. During his run on Superman, Jurgens created two major villains, Doomsday and Cyborg Superman. Doomsday was the main antagonist in "The Death of Superman" storyline, which saw him kill Superman in an issue consisting entirely of splash pages. Cyborg Superman was an existing character which Jurgens reintroduced in The Adventures of Superman #500 for the "Reign of the Supermen" storyline. Jurgens wrote and drew Justice League America (#61–77 April 1992 – July 1993) and in 1993 pencilled the Metal Men four-issue miniseries, which was a retcon of their origin story. Jurgens wrote and pencilled the crossover series Zero Hour and the Superman/Doomsday: Hunter/Prey miniseries, both in 1994.

Jurgens scripted and provided layout art for the Superman vs. Aliens miniseries. The story featured a battle between Superman and the aliens created by H. R. Giger (a.k.a. the Xenomorphs), from the titular film series. It was co-published by Dark Horse Comics and DC in 1995. In the same year, he gave up the pencilling duties on Superman. Also in 1995 he was writer/penciller on Solar with issue #46 from Valiant Comics wherein he worked with inker Dick Giordano and with penciller Tom Grindberg joining in with issues #51–54 after Jurgens relinquished penciller duties with issue #50. In 1996 Jurgens and Italian artist Claudio Castellini worked on the highly publicized crossover Marvel vs DC. Jurgens was one of the many creators who worked on the Superman: The Wedding Album one-shot in 1996 which featured the title character's marriage to Lois Lane. Jurgens developed the Tangent Comics imprint for DC the following year.

In January 1996, Jurgens was writer and penciller of the new Spider-Man series, The Sensational Spider-Man, at Marvel Comics. The title was initially conceived to be the flagship showcase for the new Spider-Man (Ben Reilly). The initial seven issues (#0–6, January–July 1996) were written and pencilled by Jurgens. Jurgens pushed strongly for the restoration of Peter Parker as the true Spider-Man and plans were made to enact this soon, but Bob Harras, the new editor-in-chief, demanded the story be deferred until after the "Onslaught" storyline. Jurgens had by this stage become disillusioned with the immense amount of group planning and constant changes of ideas and directions and took this as the last straw, resigning from the title. In a past interview several years after his Spider-Man run, Jurgens stated that he would like to have another chance on the character, since his run was with the Ben Reilly character during the Clone Saga, and not Peter Parker. Jurgens wrote and pencilled Teen Titans (vol. 2) for its entire two-year, 24-issue run (October 1996 – September 1998). George Pérez, the co-creator of The New Teen Titans, served as inker for the series' first 15 issues. After 10 years working on the Superman character, Jurgens ended his run as writer with Superman vol. 2 #150 (Nov. 1999). Also in 1999, Jurgens was writer and layout artist for the tabloid-sized graphic novel Superman/Fantastic Four, with finished art by his former The Adventures of Superman inker Art Thibert. Jurgens worked with Marvel Comics as writer on Thor vol. 2 with pencilling by John Romita Jr. and as writer/artist on Captain America vol. 3. Jurgens was the debut writer of the Tomb Raider: The Series comic book series licensed to Top Cow Productions and Image Comics, which in 1999. The debut issue of Tomb Raider was the number one selling comic book of that year. Jurgens was writer of the series until issue #21.

=== 2000s ===
In 2000, Jurgens was the writer and provided layouts for the four issue prestige miniseries Titans/Legion of Super-Heroes: Universe Ablaze, with finishes provided by Phil Jimenez. Jurgens wrote Aquaman vol. 3 from issue #63 (Jan. 2000) until its cancellation with issue #75 (Jan. 2001). In November 2002, he wrote and pencilled the four-issue weekly miniseries Superman: Day of Doom (Jan. 2003), which marked the 10-year anniversary of "The Death of Superman" storyline from 1992. After a hiatus from comics, he returned to DC Comics, providing layouts for the lead story in the Infinite Crisis Secret Files 2006 special (April 2006) and provided art for the weekly series 52 and to the six-issue limited series Crisis Aftermath: The Battle For Blüdhaven written by Jimmy Palmiotti and Justin Grey. Jurgens collaborated with writer/creator Marv Wolfman on the Nightwing series for issues #125–128. On Metamorpho: Year One, Jurgens was writer and penciller for the first two issues with Mike Norton drawing issues #3–6. Jurgens was writer and artist of the "History of the Multiverse" back-up stories in the weekly Countdown which appeared in issues #49–38. At the Los Angeles Comic Con in March 2007, DC announced a new, ongoing Booster Gold series written by Geoff Johns, pencilled by Jurgens, and inked by Norm Rapmund to begin shortly after the end of 52. He was the writer of Tangent: Superman's Reign limited series in 2008, revisiting the Tangent Comics characters and wrote and illustrated an issue of The Brave and the Bold vol. 2 No. 23 (July 2009), which featured Booster Gold and Magog.

=== 2010s ===
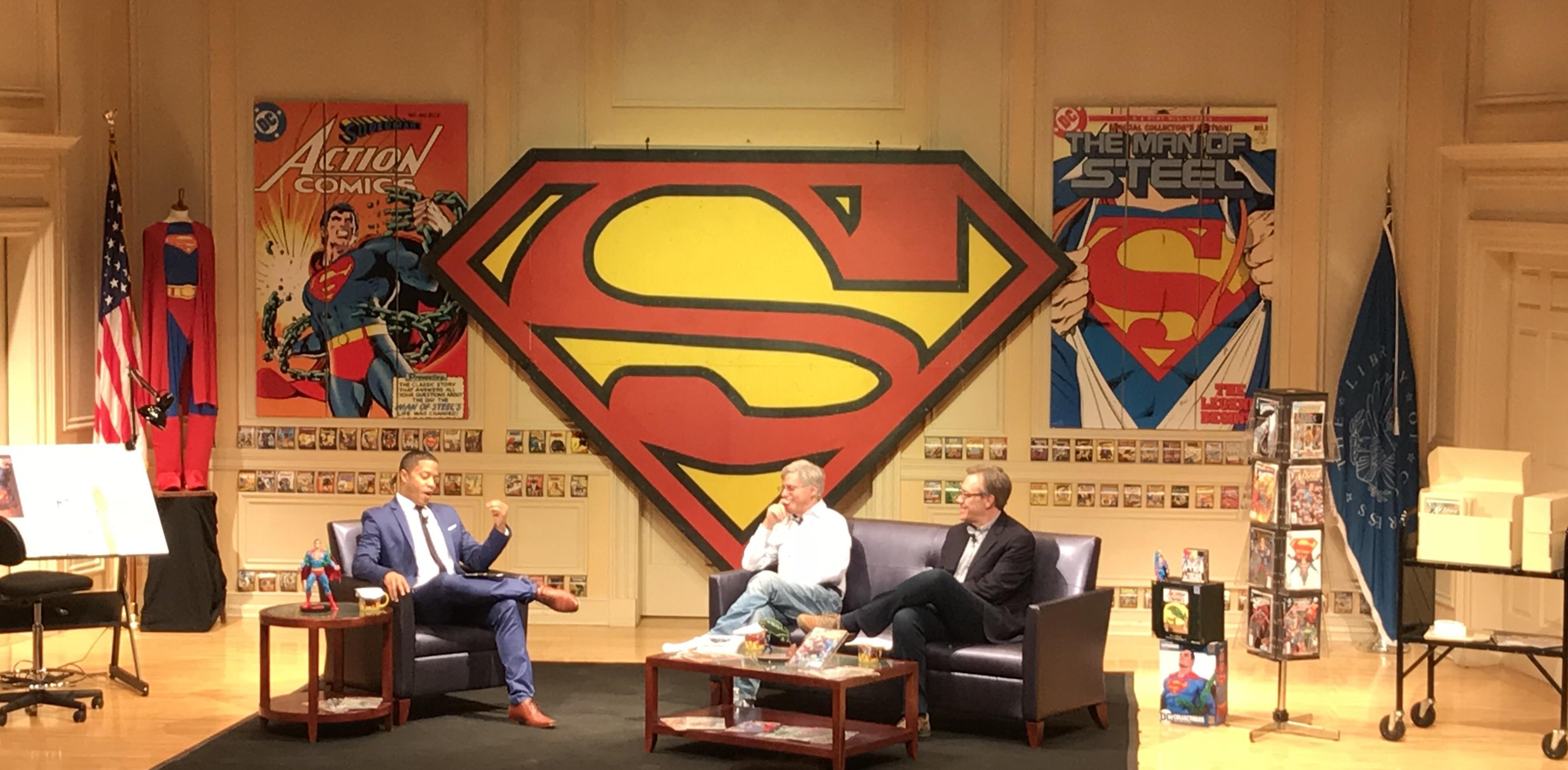
The Library of Congress hosting a discussion with Dan Jurgens and Paul Levitz for Superman's 80th anniversary and the 1,000th issue of Action Comics

Jurgens was amongst the creative talent of DC Comics' The New 52 relaunch in 2011, becoming the writer of the new Justice League International series with artist Aaron Lopresti and the artist of the new Green Arrow series with writer J. T. Krul and inker George Pérez. He became co-writer of Green Arrow with Keith Giffen on issues #3–6. DC announced in October 2011 that Jurgens would return to Superman, co-writing and drawing, the self-titled Superman series with Giffen. Their first issue was #7 (cover dated May 2012). During 2012–2013, Jurgens was writer and artist of The Fury of Firestorm: The Nuclear Men from issues #13–20, where the series was canceled. In 2014, he and Giffen together with Jeff Lemire and Brian Azzarello co-wrote The New 52: Futures End. In 2015, Jurgens became the writer for Batman Beyond, starting with issue #1 in June 2015. He was writer of the two-issue miniseries Convergence: Superman in 2015, and was the writer for Superman: Lois and Clark from 2015 to 2016. As part of the DC Rebirth relaunch of 2016, Jurgens wrote Action Comics, with the series returning to the previous numbering, beginning with issue #957. He contributed to Action Comics #1000 (June 2018) and then became the writer of the Green Lanterns series.

== Personal life ==
Jurgens is married and has two children, Quinn and Seth.

== Awards ==
Jurgens was awarded the 1994 National Cartoonists Society Award for Best Comic Book. He also received the Inkpot Award in 2013.

== Bibliography ==
=== Dark Horse Comics ===
- Superman vs. Aliens #1–3 (story and layout art) (1995)

=== DC Comics ===
- 52 #2–11, 24, 35, 43 (2006–2007)
- Action Comics #601–612 (Deadman short stories pencils), #650–667 (1988, 1990–1991), #957–984, 987–1000 (writer; also artist on #993–994 and 1000; 2016–2018)
- Action Comics Special #1 (writer, 2018)
- The Adventures of Superman #452 (with George Perez), 456 (with Jerry Ordway), 458–470 (458-459 with George Perez), 472-478, 492, 500, 551 (writer and penciller, 1989–1993); Annual #1 (pencils, 1987)
- Agent Liberty Special # 1 (writer and cover artist, 1992)
- Aquaman vol. 5 #63–75 (writer, 2000–2001)
- Aquaman and The Others #1–11 (writer, 2014–2015)
- Armageddon 2001 #1–2 (artist, 1991)
- Batman #359, 568 (1983–1999) Annual No. 9 (1985) (pencils)
- Batman Beyond vol. 5 #1–16 (writer, 2015–2016)
- Batman Beyond vol. 6 #1–11, 14–50 (writer, 2016–2020)
- Batman Beyond Rebirth #1 (writer, 2016)
- The Bat-Man: First Knight #1–3 (writer, 2024)
- The Bat-Man: Second Knight #1–3 (writer, 2025–2026)
- Booster Gold #1–25 (artist, 1986–1988)
- Booster Gold vol. 2 #1–12, 15–19, 21–31, 44–47 (artist, 2007–2008; writer/artist, 2009–2011)
- The Brave and the Bold vol. 3 #23 (writer/artist, 2009)
- Convergence #0 (writer, 2015)
- Convergence: Superman #1–2 (writer/artist, 2015)
- Countdown (writer and artist of the "History of the Multiverse" back-up stories in issues #49–38) (2007)
- Crisis Aftermath: The Battle For Blüdhaven #1–6 (2006) (pencils)
- DC Challenge #6 (1986)
- DC Universe: Legacies #7–8 (2011)
- The Death of Superman 30th Anniversary Special #1 (writer/penciller) (2023)
- Firestorm: The Nuclear Man vol. 3 #33 (2007) (layouts only)
- Flash Gordon #1–9 (miniseries) (writer/artist, 1989)
- The Fury of Firestorm: The Nuclear Men #13–20 (writer and pencils, 2012–2013)
- Green Arrow #13–14, 17–18, 21–24, 27–30, 33–34 (pencils) (1988–1990)
- Green Arrow vol. 4 #1–5 (pencils); #3–6 (co-writer) (2011–2012)
- Green Lanterns #50–57 (writer) (2018)
- Infinite Crisis Secret Files 2006 (2006) (layouts for lead story)
- Justice League America #61–77 (1992–1993)
- Justice League International #1–12 (writer, 2011–2012)
- Metal Men vol. 2 #1–4 (layouts) (1993)
- Metamorpho: Year One #1–6 (writer; artist for issues 1 and 2 only, 2007)
- The New Teen Titans vol. 2 #6 (pencils, 1984)
- Nightwing vol. 2 #125–128 (2006–2007)
- Nightwing vol. 4 #59–77 (writer, 2019–2020)
- Sun Devils #1–12 (writer and artist) (1984–1985)
- Superman vol. 2 #29, 57–146, 148, 150, 700, 0, Annual #3, 5, #9–10 (writer: 1991–1999; pencils: 1991–1995)
- Superman vol. 3 #7–12 (writer and pencils 2012)
- Superman 80-Page Giant #1 (1999) (cover artist pencils and writer for 10-page short story)
- Superman/Doomsday: Hunter/Prey (limited series; story and layouts) #1–3 (1994)
- Superman: The Doomsday Wars #1–3 (1998–1999)
- Superman: Day of Doom #1–4 (2003)
- Superman: Lois and Clark #1–8 (writer, 2015–2016)
- Superman: Secret Files #1 (writer and layout art for lead story; plus pencil art for character profiles) (1998)
- Superman/Fantastic Four #1 (writer and layout art, with finished art by Art Thibert) (1999)
- Tangent: Superman's Reign #1–12 (2008–2009) (writer)
- Teen Titans vol. 2 #1–24 (1996–1998)
- Time Masters: Vanishing Point #1–6 (2010 mini series) (writer/artist)
- Tales of the Legion of Super-Heroes #319–325 (1985)
- Titans/Legion of Super-Heroes: Universe Ablaze #1–4 (prestige miniseries. writer and layouts, with finishes by Phil Jimenez) (2000)
- The Warlord #63–88, 91 (artist) (1982–1985)
- Zero Hour: Crisis in Time! #4–0 (1994)

=== Marvel Comics ===
- Captain America (vol. 3) #25–50 (writer), #33–50 (penciller); Annual 2000; Annual 2001 (2000–2002)
- Daredevil #224 (penciller) (1985)
- Domination Factor: Fantastic Four #1-4 (writer and layouts) (1999)
- The Sensational Spider-Man #0–6 (writer and penciller) (1996)
- Thor (vol. 2) #1–58, 60–79 (writer); Annual 1999; Annual 2000; Annual 2001 (1998–2004)
- Thor (vol. 6) #24 (writer and penciller) (2022)

=== Valiant Comics ===
- Solar #46–54 writer/penciller on #46–50; writer only on #51–54 (1995)

| Preceded by Jerry Ordway | The Adventures of Superman writer/artist 1989–1991 | Succeeded by Jerry Ordway (as writer); Tom Grummett (as artist) |
| Preceded by Jerry Ordway | Superman vol. 2 artist 1991–1995 | Succeeded by Ron Frenz |
| Preceded by Jerry Ordway | Superman vol. 2 writer 1991–1999 | Succeeded by Jeph Loeb |
| Preceded by Marv Wolfman | Teen Titans vol. 2 writer 1996–1998 | Succeeded by Devin Grayson |
| Preceded by Warren Ellis | Thor vol. 2 writer 1998–2004 | Succeeded by Daniel Berman & Michael Avon Oeming |
| Preceded by Mark Waid | Captain America vol. 3 writer 2000–2002 | Succeeded by Darko Macan (Captain America: Dead Man Running) |
