= Sun Devils (comics) =

DC Comics space opera series

- Cover of Sun Devils #10 (April 1985). Art by Dan Jurgens and Steve Mitchell.

Publication information
- Publisher: DC Comics
- Schedule: Monthly
- Format: Maxi-Series
- Publication date: July 1984 – June 1985
- No. of issues: 12
- Main character: The Sun Devils

Creative team
- Created by: Gerry Conway; Roy Thomas; Dan Jurgens
- Written by: Gerry Conway; Roy Thomas; Dan Jurgens
- Penciller: Dan Jurgens
- Inker(s): Romeo Tanghal; Steve Mitchell
- Colorist: Tom Ziuko

Sun Devils is a science fiction "space opera" comic book series published by DC Comics for 12 issues between July 1984 and June 1985. Writers Gerry Conway, Roy Thomas and artist Dan Jurgens created the series.

== Creation ==
Conway spoke on the creation of the team stating

"I was a fan of Space Opera, and particularly the kind of space opera Julie Schwartz used to publish back in the 1950s and early '60s in comics like Mystery in Space and Strange Adventures. It was also the era of Star Wars, and I'd be lying if I said that wasn't a major influence"

Thomas also recounted the team's genesis

"I worked with Gerry Conway on the general concept of the team. Our original idea was to revive the Blackhawks in the future, but DC decided we should make it a new group entirely... so we (perhaps both of us, maybe just Gerry, maybe even just I) came up with the name "Sun Devils." Basically, it's the concept we both had, with a new name. Gerry came up with just about everything else."

Jurgens commented on the creation of the look of team

"Ideas come from everywhere at one point Gerry said 'think of them like Blackhawks in outer space!' Well that certainly helped influence the look of the ships and hardware, not to mention their uniforms"

== History ==
Printed in DC's deluxe paper "baxter format" and priced at the then-high price of $1.25 the series followed a group of cosmic adventurers led by Rik Sunn, the series' main protagonist. Additional cast members included Anomie Zitar, an apparent feline-human hybrid (fittingly, the team's resident "sex kitten"); a smuggler-pilot named Scyla, a tall, powerful woman whose personality borrowed heavily from Han Solo and who was identified as being from a colony on an asteroid belt; three clones, genetically raised as starship repairmen, who had no name and were referred to only as "One", "Two" and "Three" (at the start of the series, they spoke in unison or finished one another's sentences, but as the book moved along they started to develop independent personalities; toward the end, Two and Scyla became drinking buddies and possibly more); and Shikon, a member of the Sauroid race. It was the Sauroid Empire who Sunn and his mates were fighting after Karvus Khun, the leader of the Sauroids and a half-Sauroid, half-human hybrid, destroyed Sunn's homeworld of Wolfholme. At the end of the first story arc, the team was joined by a ghostly figure called Myste, a woman who had apparently "died" while serving the Sauroids, but had in fact remained somehow alive, obtained powers and turned against them, attaching herself to the Sun Devils and giving them information and direction for the rest of the story.

Sun Devils was composed of four acts, each of which was composed of three monthly issues whose covers could be assembled to make a larger image. At the end of the series, each act's covers could be stacked on top of one another, so that an even larger central image was created by putting the books three wide and four tall.

Originally set in its own unique world, Dan Jurgens later incorporated the characters into the DC Universe in a story called "The Last Sun Devil" which featured an aged Rik Sunn and a woman implied to be Scyla's daughter teaming up with Superman (Superman #86, February 1994). The issue was written and drawn by Jurgens, and inked by Steve Mitchell, who inked Jurgens' work over the last six issues of the original maxi-series.

In a March 2008 interview, Booster Gold co-writer Jeff Katz responded to a question about the Sun Devils' role in his series by telling Comic Related that Rik Sunn is a secret member of the Time Stealers, a team of supervillains currently known to be composed of Despero, Per Degaton, Supernova and the Ultra-Humanite. The next month, speaking to the same interviewer, he dismissed this claim as a joke. The in-story connection between the Sun Devils and Booster Gold, then, is unclear.

The series featured some of Jurgens' earliest penciling work and his first work as a writer/ artist. He began to script Conway's plots with #8 and fully took over the writing duties on the title with #10. Conway was originally both the writer and editor of the title; he remained the series' editor until its conclusion. It was one of the many series that DC published in "maxi-series" format throughout the mid-1980s, meaning that it was a closed-ended, 12-issue limited series—longer than most comics miniseries.
