= Seattle Sun (alternative weekly) =

The Seattle Sun was an alternative weekly in Seattle, Washington, USA, which ran from July 31, 1974 to January 6, 1982. It was a direct competitor to the Seattle Weekly; The Rocket (1979 – 2000) began as a supplement to the Sun.
