= Amazing Comics =

Several comics, comic book series or publishers have been called Amazing Comics:

- Amazing (a.k.a. Amazing Comics a.k.a. Amazing Publishing Company), an American black-and-white comic publisher associated with David Campiti that operated from 1986 to 1987
- Amazing Comics, a comic book series published by Marvel Comics beginning in 1944 (changing its title to Complete Comics with issue #2)
- Amazing Comics, a British comic book by Denis Gifford published by Modern Fiction in 1949
- Amazing Comics (コミックス), a manga publication that ran five issues in 1988–1989, published by Kasakura Shuppansha
- Amazing Comics, a four-issue series published by Avalon Communications in 2000 which featured reprints of the Terry and the Pirates comic strip
- Amazing Comics Group, a publisher from the mid-1990s, also associated with David Campiti, known for such titles as Angel Heat: The Ninth Order, Dangerous Secrets, and The Experimentals
- Amazing Comix, a comic book retailer in El Cajon, California
