= Cat-Head Comics =

American comics publisher

- Industry: Comics
- Genre: alternative, underground
- Founded: 1980
- Founder: Steve Lafler
- Defunct: 1998
- Headquarters: Eugene, Oregon (1983); Portland, Oregon (1984–c. 1989); Hudson, Massachusetts (c. 1990–1998)
- Key people: Stephen Beaupre
- Divisions: Lafler Publications

Cat-Head Comics was an American alternative/underground comics publisher that operated from 1980 to 1998. Founded by cartoonist Steve Lafler as a vehicle for his own work, Cat-Head was later joined by writer/poet/editor Stephen Beaupre. Cat-Head's longest-running title was the anthology Buzzard, which lasted 20 issues.

In addition to Lafler and Beaupre, creators published by Cat-Head included R. L. Crabb, Lloyd Dangle, Krystine Kryttre, and J. R. Williams.

== History ==
Lafler founded Cat-Head in 1980, shortly after graduating from the University of Massachusetts Amherst. Cat-Head's first publication was BenB and Gerald, a collection of Lafler's strips (titled Aluminum Foil) published in The Massachusetts Daily Collegian.

Cat-Head's first true ongoing series was Lafler's Dog Boy, which ran seven issues from 1983–1985. (In 1987, the publisher Fantagraphics picked up Dog Boy, launching a new volume which ran 10 issues.) In 1984, Cat-Head moved headquarters from Eugene, Oregon to Portland, Oregon.

In 1987, Cat-Head published its first non-Lafler title, releasing Out the Next, by Lafler's long-time friend Stephen Beaupre. The book featured Beaupre's text pieces, poems, photographs, and drawings, with some additional art by Lafler. In 1988–1989, Cat-Head published two issues of Lafler & Beaupre's Duck & Cover, featuring satirical comics and poetry by Beaupre and Lafler, parodying politics, religion, and big business.

Beaupre became Cat-Head co-publisher in 1989, helping to finance much of the publisher's output from then on. Cat-Head moved its headquarters to Hudson, Massachusetts, in 1990 (remaining there until at least 1994), and expanded its line-up, launching the long-running Buzzard anthology, edited by Beaupre, with such contributors as Lloyd Dangle, Julie Doucet, Mary Fleener, Dave Gill, Phoebe Gloeckner, Gerald Jablonski, James Kochalka, Krystine Kryttre, Adrian Tomine, Tom Tomorrow, Steven Weissman, J. R. Williams, and Aleksandar Zograf. Over the next couple of years the publisher released one-shot titles by R. L. Crabb, Lloyd Dangle, Krystine Kryttre, and J. R. Williams.

From 1993 to 1998, Cat-Head retrenched, focusing on Lafler solo titles like Bughouse and the ongoing Buzzard anthology. Critic Rob Clough described Bughouse as Lafler's

story of bebop sax prodigy Jimmy Watts and his rise to fame with his band Bughouse, which included piano player Slim, drummer Ralph and bass player Bones. Lafler explores the joys of musical camaraderie, the enticements and perils of addiction, life on the road and much more in a series of rambling stories that are short on plot but long on appealing character interactions. The characters are anthropomorphic insects, a strategy that helps keep things loose (including reality) and allows Lafler to go off in some strange directions.

All six issues of Bughouse were later collected into a trade paperback by Top Shelf Productions.

== Titles ==
=== Steve Lafler solo titles (chronologically) ===
- BenB and Gerald (1980)
- Mean Cat (1981)
- Guts (1981–1982)
- Dog Boy (7 issues, 1983–1985) — later published by Fantagraphics
- Femme Noir (2 issues, 1988) — Lafler's take on mystical crime fiction, starring a detective named Maria and her occasional boyfriend, BenB. Lafler's recurring character Dog Boy makes occasional appearances.
- Prometheus' Gift (1 issue, Oct. 1992) — Lafler's homage to Jack Kirby and Psilocybin mushrooms
- Bughouse (6 issues, Mar. 1994–Mar. 1997)
- Jonk!: A Bughouse Fable (1 issue, 1998)

=== Other titles (alphabetically) ===
- Bad Comics (1 issue, 1990) — J. R. Williams
- Bummer (1 issue, 1992) — J. R. Williams; later continued by Fantagraphics
- Buzzard (20 issues, 1990–1998)
- Crabbs (1 issue, 1993) — R. L. Crabb
- Dangle (1 issue, 1991) — Lloyd Dangle
- Death Warmed Over (1 issue, 1990) — Krystine Kryttre
- Duck & Cover (2 issues, 1988–1989) — Lafler & Stephen Beaupre
- Out the Next (1 issue, 1987) — Stephen Beaupre
