= Alternative comics =

Post-1970s independent comics publications

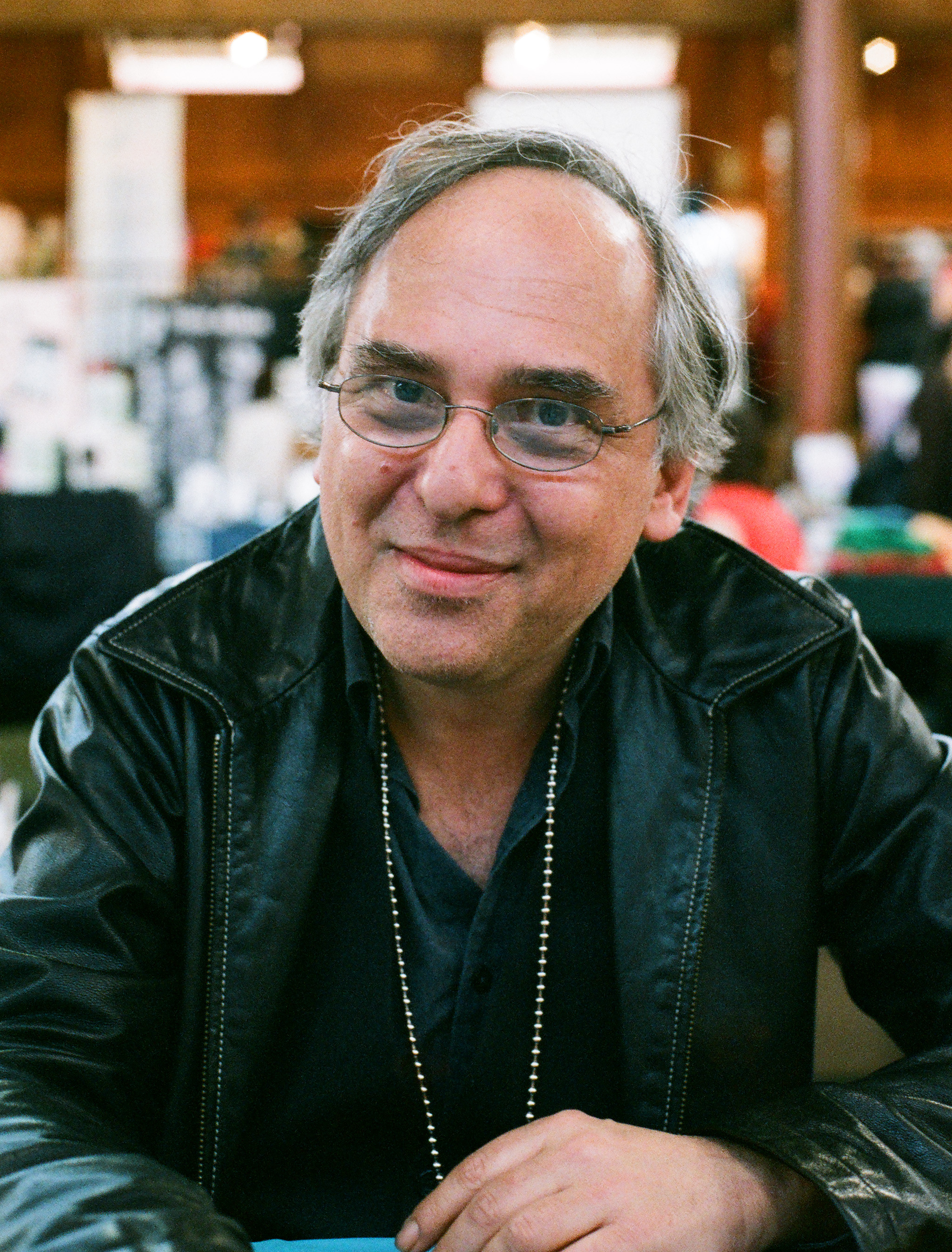
- Photo of Art Spiegelman at the Alternative Press Expo.
- Publishers: Fantagraphics Books; Drawn & Quarterly; Alternative Comics; Last Gasp; Top Shelf Productions
- Publications: Raw; Love and Rockets; Eightball; Hate

Subgenres
- Minicomics; Indie comics

Related genres
- Underground comix

Alternative comics or independent comics cover a range of American comics that have appeared since the 1980s, following the underground comix movement of the late 1960s and early 1970s. During the 1970s, the superhero comic companies Marvel and DC dominated, controlling over 80% of the American comic book market. Independent comics developed as an alternative to these mainstream superhero comics.

Alternative comics span a wide range of genres, artistic styles, and subjects. However, they often stray away from the mainstream superhero-based style of comics, instead focusing on taking a more "realistic" approach. If alternative comics start by using a mainstream topic or genre, they will find a way to twist that and create new meaning from it.

Alternative comics are often published in small numbers with less regard for regular distribution schedules.

Many alternative comics have variously been labelled as post-underground comics, independent comics, indie comics, auteur comics, small press comics, new wave comics, creator-owned comics, art comics, or literary comics. Many self-published "minicomics" also fall under the "alternative" umbrella.

== History ==
=== The rise of underground comix ===
During the late 1940s and through the 1950s, the classic comic strips in newspapers were quickly becoming less and less popular to a point where the size of these comics were shrinking in their published newspapers. Creators felt that they were hindered by a lack of creative independence and that mainstream comics followed a single formula too strictly. This led to some creators moving away from major publishers and beginning to publish their own comics.

=== The fall of underground comix ===
In the late 1960s and early 1970s, "head shops" were the most common places to buy underground comix. Beyond that, they were also places where fans of the underground culture could group together and bond over their shared interest. Many underground comix creators even became well known faces in the comic industry. Robert Crumb's Zap #1, released in 1968, was one of the most prominent underground comix of its time and really pushed this era forward. Crumb quickly became a leading figure during this era. New creators began popping up, inspired by the change. However, by the mid-1970s, artists within the underground comix scene felt that it had become less creative than it had been in the past. According to Art Spiegelman, "What had seemed like a revolution simply deflated into a lifestyle. Underground comics were stereotyped as dealing only with sex, dope and cheap thrills. They got stuffed back into the closet, along with bong pipes and love beads, as things started to get uglier." In an attempt to address this, underground cartoonists moved to start magazines that anthologized new, artistically ambitious comics in the 1980s. RAW, a lavishly produced, large format anthology that was clearly intended to be seen as a work of art was founded by Spiegelman and his wife Françoise Mouly in 1980. Another magazine, Weirdo, was started by Crumb in 1981.

These magazines reflected changes from the days of the underground comix. They had different formats from the old comix, and the selection of artists differed, too. RAW featured many European artists, Weirdo included photo-funnies and strange outsider art-type documents. Elfquest was based on a science fiction/fantasy theme with powerful female and male characters of varied races and cultures, and done in a bright and colourful manga-like style. The underground staples of sex, drugs and revolution were much less in evidence. More emphasis was placed on developing the craft of comics drawing and storytelling, with many artists aiming for work that was both subtler and more complex than was typical in the underground. This was true of much of the new work done by the established comix artists as well as the newcomers: Art Spiegelman's Maus, much celebrated for bringing a new seriousness to comics, was serialized in RAW.

=== The underground-alternative transition ===
While fans debate the origins of self-publishing in the comics industry, many consider Dave Sim an early leader in this area. Starting in 1977, he primarily wrote, drew and published Cerebus the Aardvark on his own under the "Aardvark-Vanaheim Inc." imprint and announcing he would publish 300 issues of the series consecutively, something unheard of at the time for a self-published book. Sim is known for his activism in favor of creators' rights and his outspoken nature in regards to the industry. He often used the back of his comic to deliver "messages from the President", which were sometimes editorials concerning the comics industry and self-publishing.

Wendy and Richard Pini founded WaRP Graphics, one of the early American independent comics publishers, in 1977 and released the first issues of their long-running series, Elfquest, in February 1978. They followed with titles such as MythAdventures and related titles by Robert Asprin; and Thunder Bunny, created by Martin Greim. WaRP was also the original publisher of A Distant Soil by Colleen Doran. As an alternative to most of the masculine-themed comics of its time – and even to this day – Elfquest became enormously popular among female comic book fans around the world, while also drawing a solid male fan base. WaRP Graphics paved the way for many independent and alternative comic book creators who came after them. At its peak in the mid-1980s, Elfquest was selling 100,000 copies per issue in the initial print run, attracting one of the largest followings of any direct-sale comic. Most issues up to No. 9 saw multiple printings. It was the visible success of Elfquest that inspired many other writers and artists to try their own hand at self-publishing.

During the 1980s, the "black and white boom" was one of the most important events as a part of pushing alternative and independent comics forward. This "boom" introduced many new creators and publishers. The peak of this event came with Kevin Eastman and Peter Laird's Teenage Mutant Ninja Turtles, a black & white series by Mirage Studios. It became a cultural sensation and its first comic sold over 100,000 copies. It went on to become a multi-billion dollar franchise with many more comics, films, cartoons, toys, and more. It was very influential on a new generation of creators and became a huge success story of self-publishing.

Jeff Smith, a friend of Dave Sim, was also very influential in self-published comics, creating the highly popular and long-lived Bone. Like Sim with Cerebus and unlike mainstream comic books stories with their spontaneously generated and rambling narratives, Smith produced Bone as a story with a planned end.

The publishing house Fantagraphics published the work of a new generation of artists, notably Love and Rockets by the brothers Jaime, Gilbert and Mario Hernandez.

Dan DeBono published Indy – The Independent Comic Guide, a magazine covering only independent comics starting in 1994. It ran for 18 issues and featured covers by Daniel Clowes, Tim Vigil, Drew Hayes, William Tucci, Jeff Smith and Wendy and Richard Pini.

Alternative comics have increasingly established themselves within the larger culture, as evidenced by the success of the feature film Ghost World based on one of the best selling alternative titles, Eightball, by Daniel Clowes and the cross-genre success of the book Jimmy Corrigan, the Smartest Kid on Earth, by Chris Ware, a story that was serialized in Ware's comic, Acme Novelty Library.

Image Comics and Dark Horse Comics publish many alternative comics. Notable examples include Stan Sakai's Usagi Yojimbo, Sergio Aragonés's Groo the Wanderer, and James O'Barr's The Crow.

Oni Press used the term "real mainstream," coined by Stephen L. Holland of the UK comic shop Page 45, to describe its output. Traditional American comic books regard superhero titles as "mainstream" and all other genres as "non-mainstream", a reversal of the perception in other countries. Oni Press, therefore, adopted the "real mainstream" term to suggest that it publishes comic books and graphic novels whose subject matter is more in line with the popular genres of other media: thrillers, romances, realistic drama and so on. Oni Press avoids publishing superhero, fantasy and science fiction titles, unless interesting creators approach these concepts from an unusual angle.

Top Shelf Productions has published many notable alternative comics such as Craig Thompson's Blankets and Alex Robinson's Box Office Poison. In 2010 they branched out into unusual Japanese manga, with the release of AX:alternative manga (edited by Sean Michael Wilson). This 400-page collection received a high level of critical praise.

=== Culture ===
In the 1960s and 1970s, alternative comics played a large role in the youth counterculture movement that consisted of breaking social norms, advocating for peace, love, social justice, and more. The comics appealed to a younger fanbase and were widely popular among those also involved with the punk subculture. Because alternative comics often addressed problems that the youth of the 1960s and 1970s could relate to, such as mental-health issues, politics, and struggles with identity, the comics' popularity increased drastically. These were topics that the mainstream media did not typically address, making alternative comics an outlet for authors who wanted their readers to be able to identify with the themes they presented in their work. The representation of cultures and communities not commonly found in mainstream comics was a big part of alternative comics. LGBTQ, black, and other minority groups were often incorporated more heavily in these comics than anywhere else at the time. The involvement of these groups broadened the audience for alternative comics while simultaneously creating a culture built on inclusion and community.

=== List of publishers ===
Though categories might overlap, this list makes a division between more strictly "alternative" comics and independent publishers operating primarily in the action-adventure, crime, horror and movie/TV-tie in genres.

==== Alternative comics ====
- Alternative Comics (1993–2020)
- L'Association (France) (1990–present)
- Black Eye Productions (1992–1998)
- Buenaventura Press/Pigeon Press (2004–2010; 2010–2016)
- Callworks Inc. (2009–present)
- Cat-Head Comics (1980–1998)
- Conundrum Press (Canada) (1995–present)
- Drawn & Quarterly (Canada) (1991–present)
- Fantagraphics Books (1976–present)
- First Second Books (2006–present); division of Holtzbrinck
- Highwater Books (1997–2004)
- Kitchen Sink Press (1970–1999)
- Koyama Press (2007–present)
- Last Gasp (1970–present); originally an underground publisher; has not published original comics since c. 2005
- Gator Graphix (1986–1988)
- Mineshaft Magazine (1999–present)
- MU Press (1990–2006)
- NBM Publishing (1984–present)
- Neoglyphic Media (2012–present)
- Pantheon Books graphic novel division (1978–present); subsidiary of Random House
- Sacred Mountain (1998–present)
- Silver Sprocket (2012–present)
- Slave Labor Graphics/Amaze Ink (1986–present)
- Space Face Books (2011–present)
- Sparkplug Comics (2002–2016)
- Starhead Comix (1984–1999)
- Top Shelf Productions (1997–present)
- Township Comics (2016–present)
- Vortex Comics (Canada) (1982–1994)
- World War 3 Illustrated (1980–present)

==== Independent ====
- A Wave Blue World (????–present)
- Aardvark-Vanaheim (1977–present)
- Abrams ComicArts (2009–present); Imprint of Abrams Books
- Action Lab Comics (2010–present)
- AfterShock Comics (2015–present)
- Albatross Funnybooks (2002–present)
- Alterna Comics (2006–present)
- Amulet Books (????–present); Imprint of Abrams Books
- Antarctic Press (1984–present)
- Apollo Comics (2016–present)
- Apple Comics (1986–1994)
- Attaboy Funny Books (2014–present)
- Aspen Comics (2003–present)
- Asylum Press (1999–present)
- Arcana Comics (2004–present)
- Ark Vindicta Development & Publishing, LLC (2012–present)
- Avatar Press (1996–present)
- AWA Studios (2018–present)
- Bedside Press (2014–present)
- Beyond Comics (2001–present)
- Black Mask Studios (2012–present)
- Blackthorne Publishing (1985–1990)
- Blue Juice Comics (2012–present)
- Boom! Studios (2005–present)
- Caliber Comics (1989–2000)
- Class Comics (1995–present)
- Comico (1982–1997)
- Continüm Comics (1988–1994)
- Creative Impulse Entertainment (2003–present)
- CrossGen (Cross Generation Entertainment) (1998–2004)
- Darby Pop Publishing (2013–present)
- Dark Horse Comics (1986–present)
- Desperado Publishing (2005–present); IDW Publishing imprint since 2009
- Devil's Due Publishing (1999–present)
- Diego Comics Publishing (2012–present)
- Drawn & Quarterly (1990–present)
- DSLTRY (2023–present)
- Dream Key Comics (2021–present)
- Dynamite Entertainment (2005–present)
- Eclipse Comics (1978–1994)
- Emerald Star Comics (2013–present)
- Event Comics (1994–1999); absorbed by Marvel Comics
- FantaCo Enterprises (1978–1998)
- Fierce Comics (2005–present)
- First Comics (1983–1991)
- The Fourth Age (2021–present)
- Harrier Comics (U.K.) (1984–1989)
- Harris Comics (1985–2008)
- Hyperwerks (1997–present)
- IDW Publishing (1999–present)
- Image Comics (1992–present)
- In Planet Studio (2010–present)
- Iron Circus Comics (2007–present)
- keenspot (2000–present)
- Lion Forge Comics (2011–present)
- Mad Cave Studios (2014-present)
- Malibu Comics (1986–1994); absorbed by Marvel Comics
- Markosia (2005–present)
- Millennium Publications (1990–2000)
- MonkeyBrain Books (????–present)
- Moonstone Books (1995–present)
- NBM Publishing (1976, 1984–present)
- NOW Comics (1985–2006)
- Oni Press (1997–present)
- Papercutz (2005–present)
- Pendulum Press (1970–1994)
- Personality Comics (1991–1993)
- Radical Comics (2007–present)
- Raw Studios (????–present)
- Raytoons Comics (2007–present)
- Red 5 Comics (2007–present)
- Revolutionary Comics (1989–1994)
- Rippaverse (2022–present)
- Scattered Comics (1991–present)
- Shadowline (1993–present)
- SketchBoox Entertainment (2015–present)
- Slave Labor Graphics (1986–present)
- So Cherry Studios (2014–present)
- So What? Press (2011–present)
- TidalWave Productions (2007–present)
- Titan Comics (2012–present)
- TKO Studios (2017–present)
- Udon Entertainment (2000–present)
- Un Faulduo (2005–present)
- Urban Comics (2012–present)
- Valiant Comics (1989–1996, 2012–present)
- Vault Comics (2016–present)
- Viper Comics (2003–present)
- Wanga Comics (2005–present)
- WaRP Graphics (1977–present)
- Zenescope Entertainment (2005–present)

== See also ==
- Abstract comics
- Alternative manga
- Fumetti d'autore
- Garo
- Gekiga, Japanese equivalent of alternative comics
- Webcomics, which are normally self-published
