= Offbeat generation =

The Offbeat generation was a loose association of like-minded writers working across different styles but united by their opposition to a mainstream publishing industry driven by marketing departments. The term—coined by Andrew Gallix in 3:AM Magazine in February 2006—was a pun on the Beat Generation but more likely to be associated with the Chemical generation immediately before it (who were anthologised at the Repetitive Beat Generation also).

In August 2007 Arena wrote of them: "Young, untamed, good-looking and as influenced by punk rock as they are by Proust, a new wave of loosely-linked writers dubbed The Off-Beat Generation have been blitzing the net with stories and poems via MySpace and supportive sites such as 3:AM Magazine to organise events and gain publicity."

The Arena article cited Tony O'Neill, Travis Jeppesen and Tao Lin as its key members. A piece on The Guardian website discussed possible overlaps with the Brutalists.

According to a February 2009 feature in the Spanish daily ABC, the members of the Offbeat Generation are Noah Cicero, Ben Myers, Andrew Gallix, Lee Rourke, Adelle Stripe, Tao Lin, Tom McCarthy, HP Tinker, Chris Killen, Heidi James and Tony O'Neill.

In June 2009, 3:AM Magazine referred to Dazed & Aroused, by Gavin James Bower, as "nothing less than a Less Than Zero for the Offbeat Generation". 3:AM's offshoot Blackheath Books published a raft of the writers it championed as Offbeat. Other associated writers include Miles J. Bell, Sean Bonney, Steve Ely, and Todd Moore.
