= Mineshaft (magazine) =

Art magazine

- Mineshaft #30 15th Anniversary Issue front cover by Robert Crumb (Spring 2014)
- Editor: Everett Rand and Gioia Palmieri
- Categories: comix, poetry, literature, photography
- Frequency: Three times a year
- First issue: January 1999
- Country: United States
- Based in: Durham, North Carolina
- Language: American English
- Website: http://www.mineshaftmagazine.com
- ISSN: 1532-138X

Mineshaft is an independent international art magazine launched in 1999 by Everett Rand and Gioia Palmieri in Guilford, Vermont. Initially focusing on poetry and literature, the magazine began to publish comics after Robert Crumb became a contributor in 2000. The newsblog at The Guardian refers to Mineshaft's website as a source to find out more about Crumb's latest work.

== History ==
Mineshaft was the idea of Everett Rand who was inspired by his friendship and correspondence with Irving Stettner, who published the legendary underground magazine, Stroker, which featured contributions from Henry Miller and Paul Bowles. The name for the magazine came from Rand's favorite bar in La Paz, Bolivia where he and co-editor, Gioia Palmieri, lived in the early 1990s.

The first issue featured a drawing by Stettner. After issue #4, Rand wrote to Robert Crumb who responded by sending a packet of sketchbook drawings. After issue #5, Crumb designed logos for the magazine which Mineshaft has been using ever since. Crumb's regular contributions include sixteen front covers, numerous back covers, artwork, writing, and letters. After living and publishing Mineshaft in Vermont and West Virginia, the editors, Rand and Palmieri, moved their operations to Durham, North Carolina.

The magazine currently publishes new or previously unpublished material from some of the major artists of the underground comix movement, as well as other items which include fiction, poetry, photography and short essays. From 2009 to 2019, Mineshaft serialized "Excerpts from R. Crumb's Dream Diary" by Robert Crumb. In the fall of 2017, Mineshaft published The Mineshaft Reader with front cover art and design by Robert Crumb containing new and old work from regular contributors including Robert Crumb, Billy Childish, Mary Fleener, Art Spiegelman, and Jay Lynch.

Drew Friedman (cartoonist) designed the front covers for Mineshaft #37 in 2019 and #43 in 2022. Friedman calls Mineshaft "...the greatest magazine being published in the 21st century."

== Mineshaft contributors ==
- Robert Armstrong (cartoonist)
- Ace Backwords
- Peter Bagge
- Simone F. Baumann
- Brutalists: Ben Myers, Tony O'Neill, Adelle Stripe
- Charles Bukowski
- Nina Bunjevac
- Billy Childish
- Max Clotfelter
- Andrei Codrescu
- David Collier
- William Crook Jr.
- Robert Crumb
- Aline Kominsky Crumb
- Sophie Crumb
- Kim Deitch
- Simon Deitch
- Diane di Prima
- Luca Donnini
- Dennis Eichhorn
- Mary Fleener
- Drew Friedman (cartoonist)
- Justin Green
- Bill Griffith
- Glenn Head
- J.R. Helton
- Jay Kinney
- Aaron Lange
- Gunnar Lundkvist
- Jay Lynch
- Pat Moriarity
- Christoph Mueller
- Harvey Pekar
- Ed Piskor
- Peter Poplaski
- John Porcellino
- Jeremy Reed
- Spain Rodriguez
- Noah Van Sciver
- Tara Seibel
- Bruce Simon
- Art Spiegelman
- Frank Stack
- Irving Stettner
- Tommy Trantino (Thomas Trantino)
- Carol Tyler
- Fábio Vermelho
- Skip Williamson
- Aleksandar Zograf

== Mineshaft cover artists ==
- Mineshaft #1 Irving Stettner (1999)
- Mineshaft #2 Everett Rand (photo) (1999)
- Mineshaft #3 Tommy Trantino (Thomas Trantino) (2000)
- Mineshaft #4 Everett Rand (photo collage) (2000)
- Mineshaft #5 Robert Crumb (2000)
- Mineshaft #6 Robert Crumb (2001)
- Mineshaft #7 Robert Crumb (2001)
- Mineshaft #8 Jorin Ostroska (2002)
- Mineshaft #9 Robert Crumb (2002)
- Mineshaft #10 Robert Crumb (2003)
- Mineshaft #11 Robert Crumb (2003)
- Mineshaft #12 Kim Deitch with logo by Robert Crumb (2003)
- Mineshaft #13 Robert Crumb (2004)
- Mineshaft #14 Phoebe Gloeckner with logo by Robert Crumb (2004)
- Mineshaft #15 Robert Crumb (2005)
- Mineshaft #16 Robert Armstrong (cartoonist) (2005)
- Mineshaft #17 Frank Stack with logo by Robert Crumb (2006)
- Mineshaft #18 Simon Deitch (2006)
- Mineshaft #19 Peter Bagge (2007)
- Mineshaft #20 Billy Childish (2007)
- Mineshaft #21 Robert Crumb (2008)
- Mineshaft #22 Robert Armstrong (cartoonist) and Orrin J. Heller (2008)
- Mineshaft #23 Jay Lynch (2008)
- Mineshaft #24 Mary Fleener (2009)
- Mineshaft #25 Sophie Crumb with Robert Crumb (2010)
- Mineshaft #26 Pat Moriarity (2010)
- Mineshaft #27 Nina Bunjevac (2011)
- Mineshaft #28 Christoph Mueller (2012)
- Mineshaft #29 Brad Barrett with logo by Robert Crumb (2013)
- Mineshaft #30 Robert Crumb (15th Anniversary Issue) (2014)
- Mineshaft #31 Jay Lynch (2015)
- Mineshaft #32 Christoph Mueller (2015)
- Mineshaft #33 Mary Fleener (2016)
- Mineshaft #34 Robert Crumb (2016)
- Mineshaft #35 Robert Crumb (Jay Lynch Memorial Issue) (2018)
- Mineshaft #36 Robert Crumb (2018)
- Mineshaft #37 Drew Friedman (cartoonist) (2019)
- Mineshaft #38 Robert Armstrong (cartoonist) (2019)
- Mineshaft #39 Christoph Mueller (2020)
- Mineshaft #40 Robert Crumb (2021)
- Mineshaft #41 Robert Crumb, Robert Armstrong (cartoonist), and Christoph Mueller (2021)
- Mineshaft #42 Glenn Head (2022)
- Mineshaft #43 Drew Friedman (cartoonist) (2022)
- Mineshaft #44 Robert Crumb (autumn 2023)

== Awards ==
In June, 2009, Mineshaft #23 and Jay Lynch were nominated under the category "Best Cover Artist" for a Harvey Award 2009.

== See also ==
- Andrei Codrescu reviews Mineshaft #27 in The Exquisite Corpse
- Tom Spurgeon, The Comics Reporter, reviews Mineshaft #26
- "Past and Future: Mineshaft #26", Review by Rob Clough for Fantagraphics & The Comics Journal
- "Letters From Old Friends: Mineshaft #25", Review by Rob Clough for Fantagraphics and The Comics Journal
- "Midnight Snack: Mineshaft #23" Review by Tom Spurgeon in The Comics Reporter
- "Sweeping The Underground: Mineshaft #24" Review by Rob Clough in his "High-Low" comics column
- The Comics Reporter: Tom Spurgeon reviews Mineshaft #21
- WFMU Beware of the Blog reviews Mineshaft #18
