= The Portico Library =

Subscription library in Manchester, England

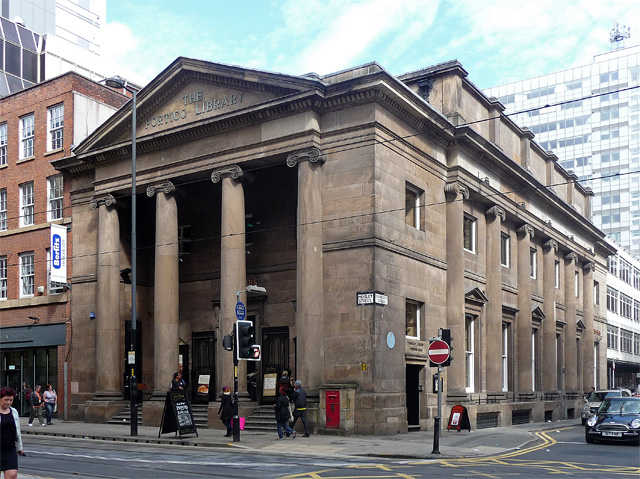
- The Portico Library in 2011

- Location within Greater Manchester

General information
- Location: Mosley Street, Manchester, England
- Coordinates: 53°28′47″N 2°14′25″W
- Year built: 1802–1806; 220 years ago

Design and construction
- Designations

Listed Building – Grade II*
- Official name: The Portico Library and The Bank public house
- Designated: 25 February 1952
- Reference no.: 1197930

Website
- theportico.org.uk

The Portico Library (also known as The Portico or Portico Library and Gallery) on Mosley Street in Manchester city centre, England, is an independent subscription library designed in the Greek Revival style by Thomas Harrison of Chester and built between 1802 and 1806. It is recorded in the National Heritage List for England as a Grade II* listed building, having been designated on 25 February 1952, and has been described as "the most refined little building in Manchester". Founded by local businessmen as a newsroom‑and‑library institution, it opened in 1806 and quickly became a centre of literary and intellectual life in the city; its first secretary, Peter Mark Roget, began work on his thesaurus there. Today it continues to operate as an independent library and cultural venue, with its historic collection housed on the upper floors and the ground floor occupied by The Bank public house.

== History ==
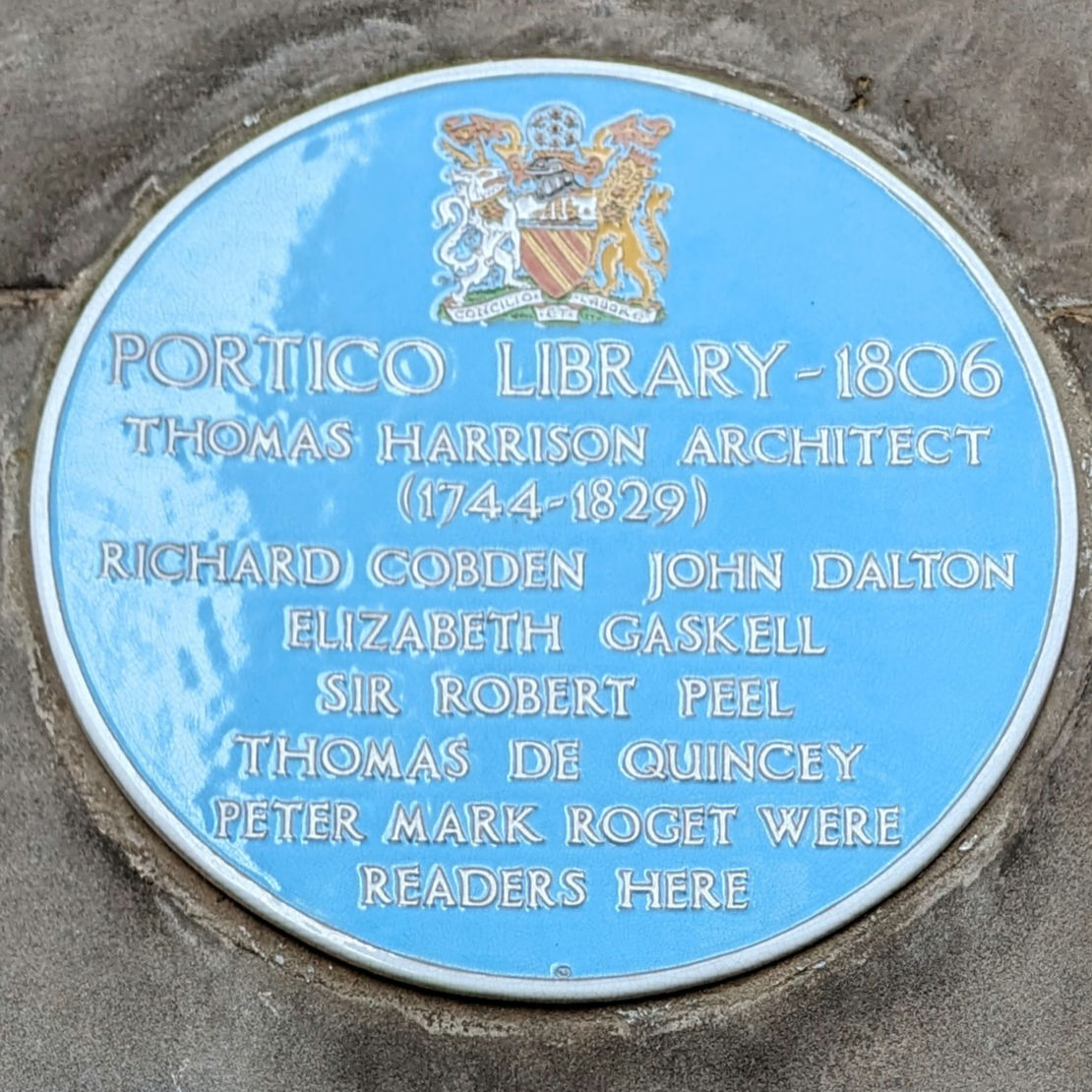
Blue plaque outside the Portico Library naming Thomas Harrison, Richard Cobden, John Dalton, Elizabeth Gaskell, Robert Peel, Thomas De Quincey and Peter Mark Roget as readers at the library

The library was established in 1802 after a meeting of Manchester businessmen resolved to create an "institute uniting the advantages of a newsroom and a library". A visit by four of the men to the Athenaeum in Liverpool encouraged the group to pursue a similar venture in Manchester. Funding was secured through 400 subscriptions, and the library opened in 1806.

The building, designed by Thomas Harrison and constructed by one of the founders, David Bellhouse, was mainly focused on 19th-century literature. Its first secretary, Peter Mark Roget, began work on his thesaurus there.

The ground floor is now occupied by The Bank, a public house named after the Bank of Athens, which leased the premises in 1921. The library occupies the first floor, accessed from Charlotte Street.

In November 2023, the library received a £453,000 grant from the National Lottery Heritage Fund to transform the building and safeguard its collection. The project aims to reunite all three original floors for the first time in more than a century. Plans include converting the ground floor and basement into a "northern bookshop" with educational activities, dining and exhibition areas, and meeting spaces, while the upper floors would display the library's book collection, manuscript archive and architectural features.

== Architecture ==
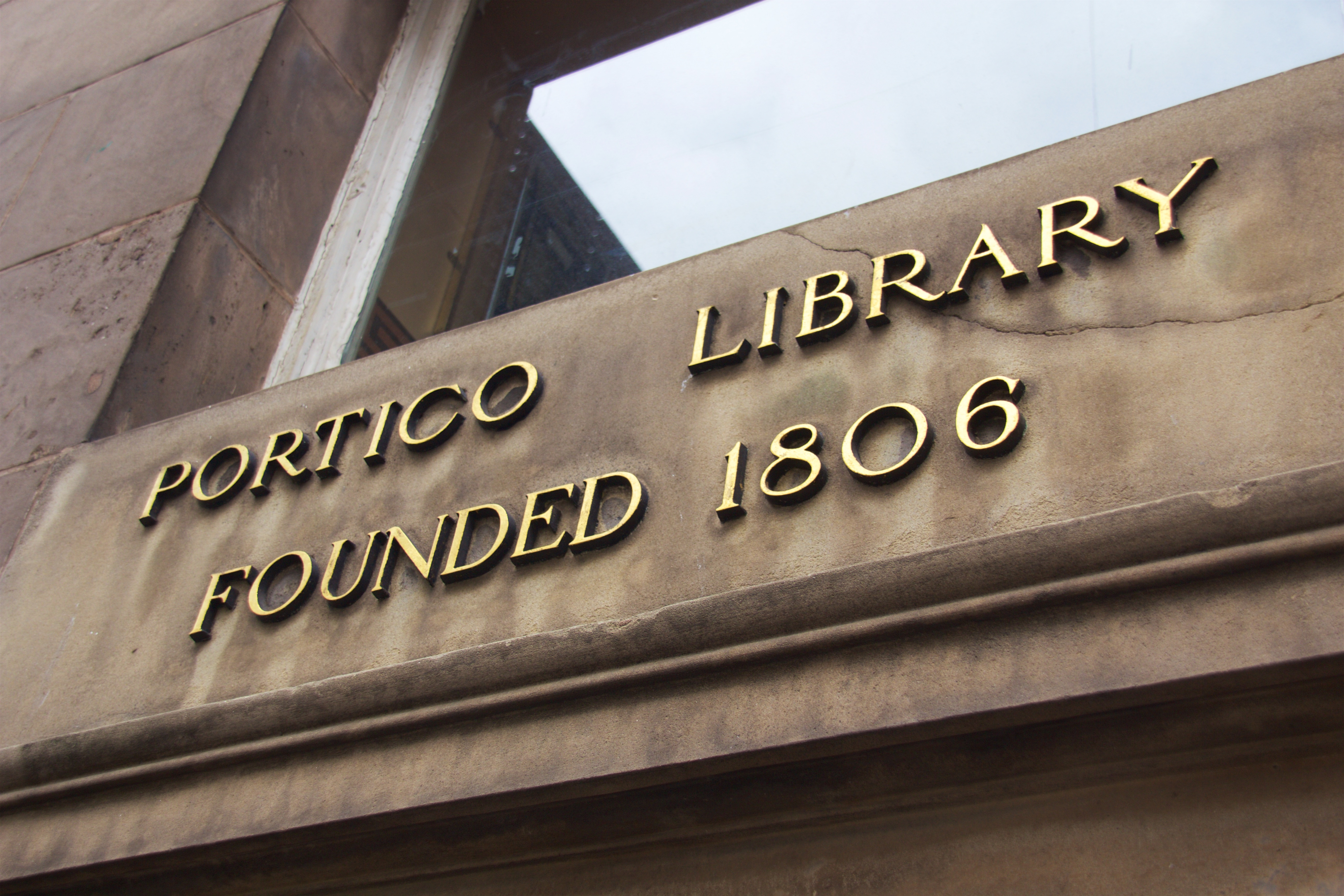
The sign above the entrance to the library

The library was the first Greek Revival building in the city. Its interior was inspired by John Soane. The library has a rectangular plan and is constructed in sandstone ashlar on a corner site at 57 Mosley Street. It has two storeys, a basement and roof space. Its façade on Mosley Street has a three-bay pedimented loggia with four Ionic columns set slightly forward and steps between the columns. Under the loggia are two entrance doors and three square windows at first floor level.

The Charlotte Street façade has an entrance into the loggia with a square window above and another on the first floor. A five-bay colonnade of Ionic semi-columns has tall sash windows on the ground floor in each bay and square window above at first floor level. The attic storey is behind a pilastered parapet. Originally the reading room was on the ground floor and the library occupied the remainder of the ground floor and a mezzanine gallery. A glass-domed ceiling was inserted at gallery level in about 1920 to separate the new tenants from what remained of the library.

== Prizes ==
The Portico Library, in conjunction with its cultural partners and funders, hosts a series of literary prizes throughout the year to celebrate writers and poets from Northern England and beyond. The Portico Prize for Literature was established in 1985 and awarded biennially to a work of fiction or poetry and a work of non-fiction set wholly or mainly in the north of England. The library launched the Sadie Massey Award to celebrate the North West's young writers in 2015.

=== Recipients ===
2010s
Year	Winner(s)	Shortlist	Ref
2010	Fiction: How to Paint a Dead Man, Sarah Hall; Non-fiction: The Plot: A Biography of an English Acre, Madeleine Bunting		
2012	Fiction: The Beautiful Indifference: Stories, Sarah Hall	She's Leaving Home, Joan Bakewell; The Doll Princess, Tom Benn; Ragnarok: The End of the Gods, A. S. Byatt; The Hunger Trace, Edward Hogan; The Last Word, Mark Illis; Reality, Reality, Jackie Kay; The Retribution, Val McDermid; The Testament of Jessie Lamb, Jane Rogers; The Adult, Joe Stretch; Hungry, The Stars and Everything, Emma Jane Unsworth; The Visiting Angel, Paul Wilson; How the Trouble Started, Robert Williams	
2012	Non-fiction: Strands: A Year of Discoveries on the Beach, Jean Sprackland	Walking Home, Simon Armitage; William Armstrong, Magician of the North, Henrietta Heald; Nella Last in the 1950s, Robert and Patricia Malcolmson; Jack's Yak, Keith Richardson; Brief Lives: Elizabeth Gaskell, Alan Shelston; The Man Who Couldn't Stop Drawling, Chris Wadsworth; Jews and Other Foreigners, Bill Williams; Why Be Happy When You Could Be Normal?, Jeanette Winterson; Ralph Tailor's Summer: A Scrivener, his City and the Plague, Keith Wrightson	
2015	Fiction: Beastings, Benjamin Myers	Boneland, Alan Garner; Her Birth, Rebecca Goss; Terror, Toby Martinez de las Rivas; Two Countries, Katrina Porteous; Drysalter, Michael Symmons Roberts	
2015	Non-fiction: The Valley, Richard Benson	Common Ground, Rob Cowen; A Shepherd's Life, James Rebanks; The Last Act of Love, Cathy Rentzenbrink; The Pinecone, Jenny Uglow	

2020s
Year	Winner(s)	Shortlist	Ref
2020	Saltwater, Jessica Andrews	Ironopolis, Glen James Brown; The Boy with the Perpetual Nervousness, Graham Caveney; Under the Rock: The Poetry of a Place, Benjamin Myers; The Mating Habit of Stags, Ray Robinson; Black Teeth and a Brilliant Smile, Adelle Stripe	
2022	Toto Among the Murderers, Sally J Morgan	Ghosted, Jenn Ashworth; The Outsiders, James Corbett; The Family Tree, Sairish Hussain; Sea State, Tabitha Lasley; Mayflies, Andrew O'Hagan	

== Notable members ==
The library's first chairman was John Ferriar and its secretary was Peter Mark Roget. Other notable members include John Dalton, Reverend William Gaskell, Sir Robert Peel and more recently Eric Cantona. Many of the membership have overlapped with that of the Manchester Literary and Philosophical Society.

== Gallery ==
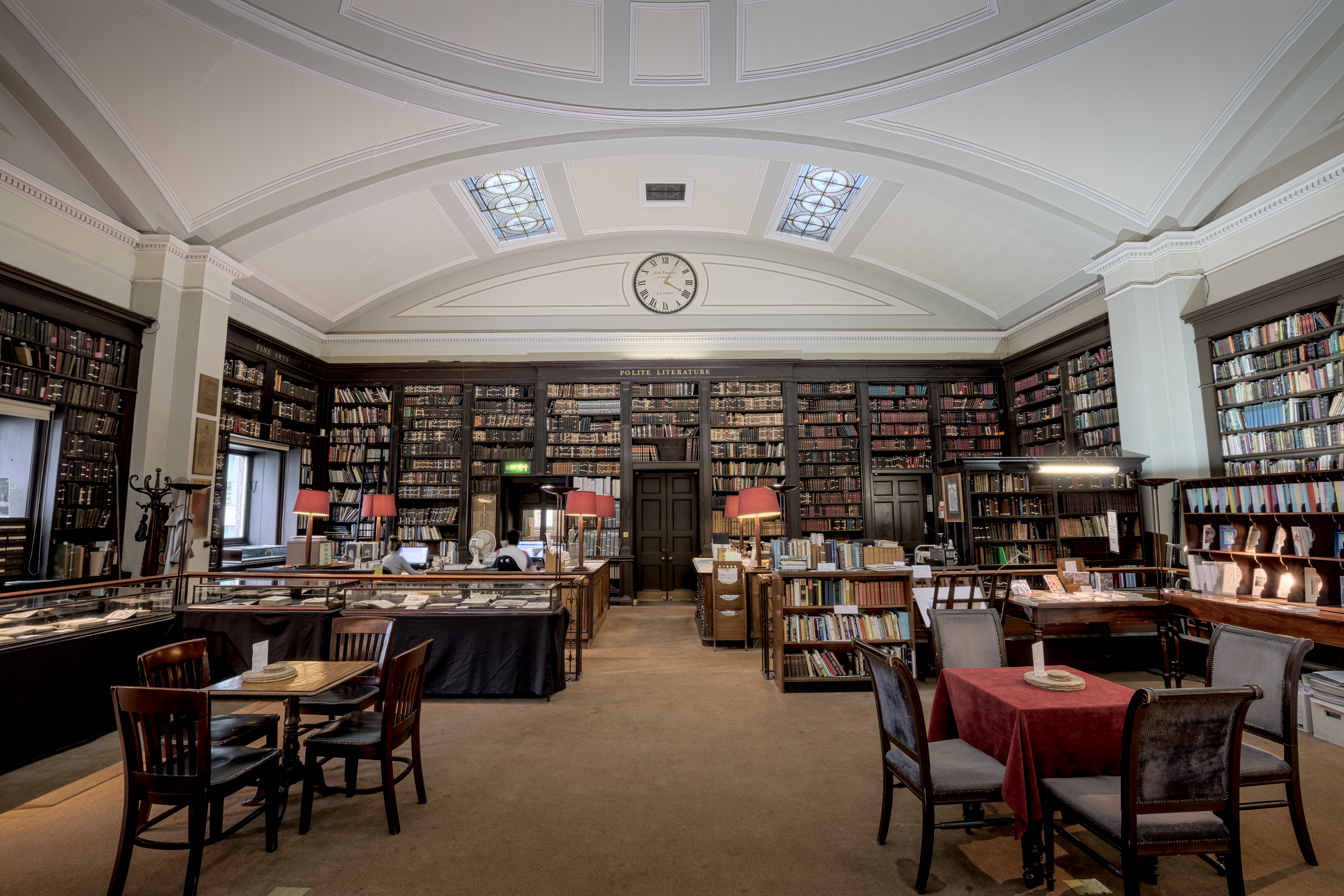
The main room

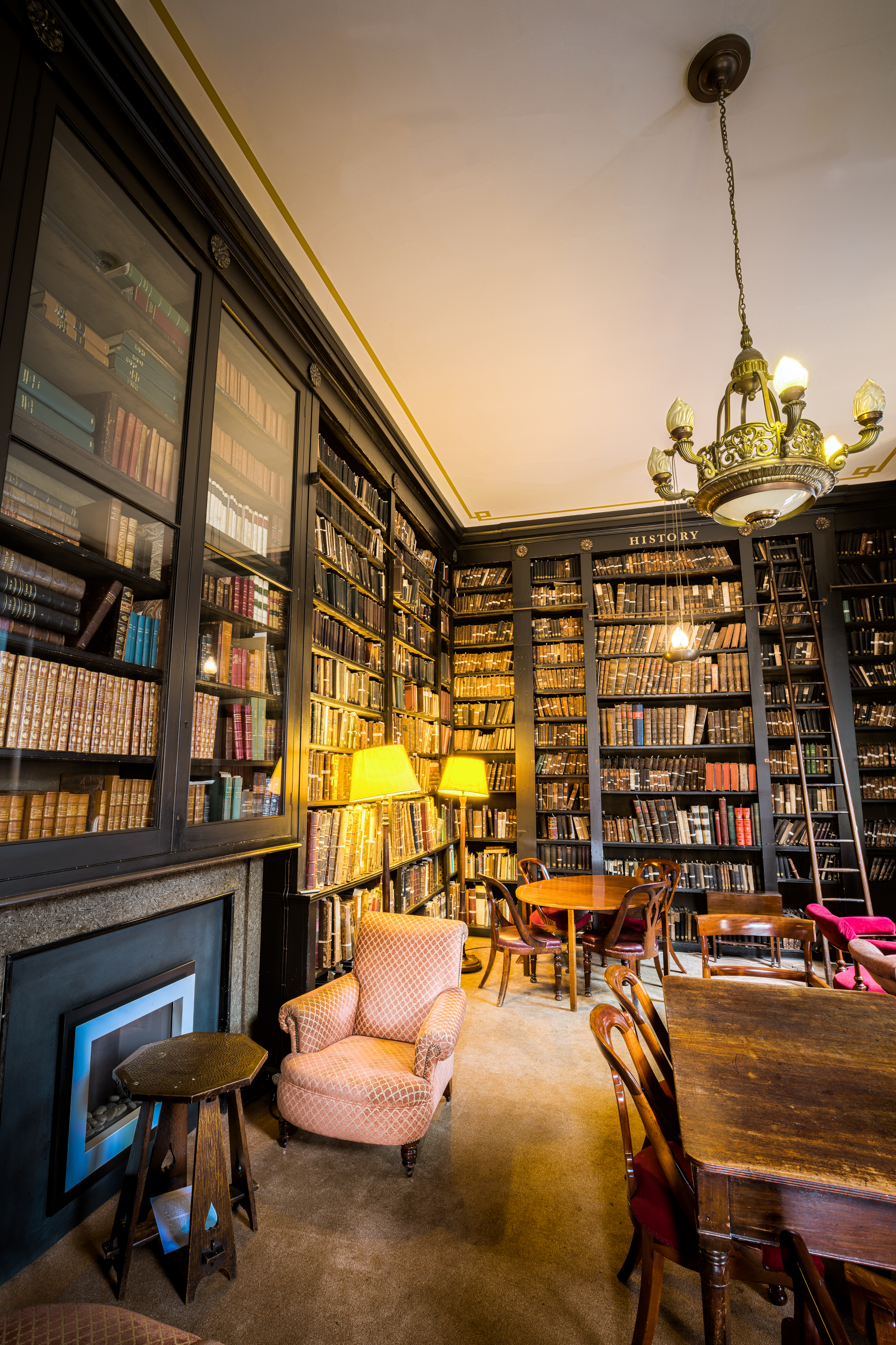
Reading room

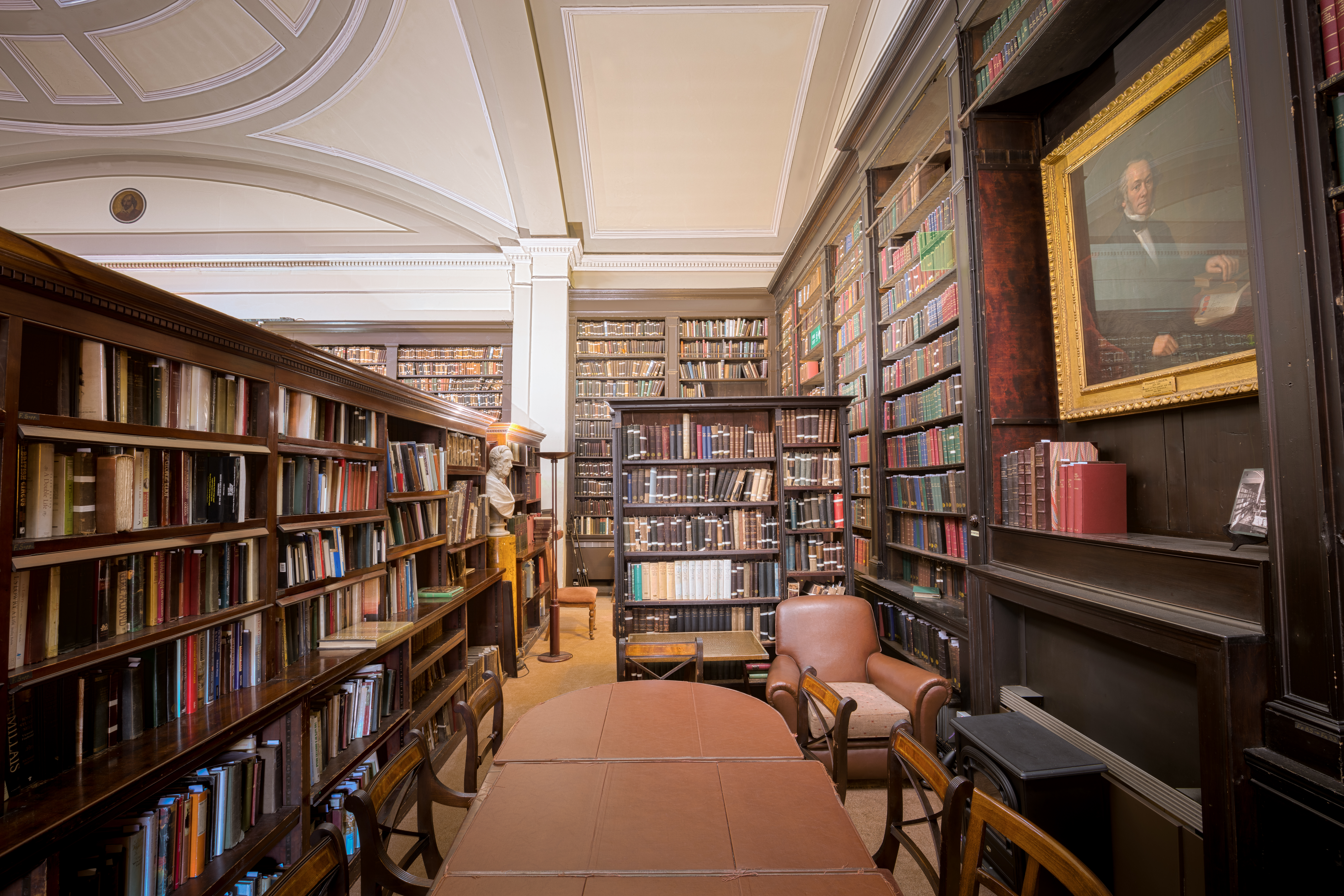
Reading area

== See also ==
- Grade II* listed buildings in Greater Manchester
- List of works by Thomas Harrison
- Listed buildings in Manchester-M2
- Listed pubs in Manchester
