= HP Tinker =

British writer (born 1969)

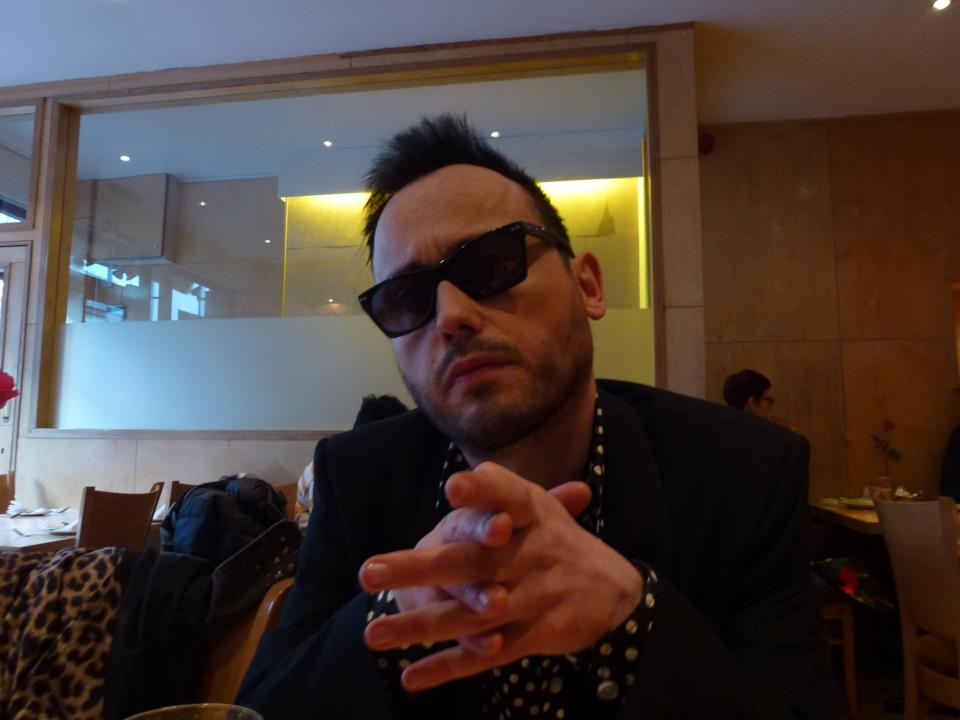
- Born: 1969 (age 56–57); Southport, England
- Occupation: Writer
- Writing career
- Period: 2004–present
- Notable works: The Swank Bisexual Wine Bar of Modernity, The Girl Who Ate New York

HP Tinker (born 24 May 1969) is a Manchester-based short story writer of comic avant garde fiction. In 2007, Time Out called him an "unsung comic genius" and he has been referred to as "the Thomas Pynchon of Chorlton-cum-Hardy".

Initially championed by Martin Bax at Ambit, novelist Nicholas Royle and 3:AM Magazine's Andrew Gallix, he was considered a central member of the short-lived Offbeat generation

His collection of short fiction, The Swank Bisexual Wine Bar of Modernity (2007), became an instant underground classic on its release and earned Tinker cult author status. "If HP Tinker didn't exist, you'd have to make him up... he is as influenced as much by Woody Allen, Dr. Seuss and Morrissey as he is by William Burroughs and Joe Orton. As one of the brave ones — and one of Britain's most shameless writers — HP Tinker has been peddling his own brand of surrealism for years now, in stories littered with pop cultural references where you are likely to meet Dorothy Parker, Tom Paulin, Paul Gauguin as you are Dean Martin and Morrissey." (Dogmatika website)

The Times has praised his "hilarious deadpan surrealism", The Independent thought him "unusual, arresting, smart and very funny" and The Guardian remarked that he "fizzes with the kind of zany, surreal conjunctions that recall Barthelme and Pynchon in their prime."

In 2010 HP Tinker appeared in the 200th edition of Ambit magazine alongside Sir Peter Blake and Jonathan Lethem.

His story "Alice In Time & Space and Various Major Cities" was included in Best British Short Stories 2012.

Author Lee Rourke devoted a chapter to HP Tinker in A Brief History of Fables, describing his work as “a grand symphony of intertextuality, tomfoolery and theoretical intent”.

A second collection of short stories, The Girl Who Ate New York, was published in 2015. In his review, the novelist David Rose commented, "John Ashbery described the late Lee Harwood as Britain’s best-kept secret; H.P. Tinker is another, even better-kept secret" and called the book "one of the wittiest, most allusive and elusive collections I have read in years."

== Works ==
=== Fiction ===
- The Swank Bisexual Wine Bar of Modernity (Social Disease, 2007)
- The Girl Who Ate New York (East London Press, 2015)
- Le détective (Nightjar Press, 2019)

=== Anthologies ===
- Dreams Never End (Tindal St Press, 2004)
- The Edgier Waters: Five Years of 3:AM (Snow Books, 2006)
- Expletive Deleted (Bleak House Books, 2007)
- The Mammoth Book of Best British Crime (Robinson Publishing, 2009)
- Bloody Vampires (Glasshouse Books, 2010)
- Best British Short Stories (Salt, 2012)
- We'll Never Have Paris (Repeater Books, 2019)
