= Wrecking Ball Press =

Independent English publisher based in England

Wrecking Ball Press is an independent poetry and prose publishing company, based in Hull, East Riding of Yorkshire, England. It was established and is edited by Shane Rhodes.

Wrecking Ball Press produces a regular anthology, The Reater, as well as live events. Its other publications include Dan Fante's Corksucker, Richard Adams' Daniel, Roddy Lumsden's Roddy Lumsden is Dead, Ben Myers' The Book Of Fuck and Tony O'Neill's Digging the Vein.

== Some writers and poets appearing on Wrecking Ball Press ==
- Richard Adams (author)
  Daniel ISBN 1-903110-37-8 (hb) ISBN 1-903110-36-X (special signed edition)
- Elizabeth Barrett
  The Bat Detector ISBN 1-903110-27-0
- Matthew Caley
  The Scene of my Former Triumph ISBN 1-903110-29-7
- Brendan Cleary
  Stranger in the House ISBN 1-903110-06-8
- Tim Cumming
  Contact Print ISBN 1-903110-10-6
- Fiona Curran
  The Hail Mary Pass ISBN 1-903110-41-6
- Dan Fante
  Corksucker ISBN 1-903110-26-2
  A Gin Pissing, Raw Meat, Dual Carburettor V-8 Son-of-a-Bitch from Los Angeles ISBN 1-903110-07-6
- Geoff Hattersley
  Harmonica ISBN 1-903110-11-4
- Mark Kotting
  Nappy Rash ISBN 1-903110-16-5 with foreword by UK comedian and writer Sean Lock.
- Gerald Locklin
  the case of the missing blue volkswagen ISBN 1-903110-01-7
- Roddy Lumsden
  Roddy Lumsden is Dead ISBN 1-903110-08-4
- Daithidh MacEochaidh
  Travels with Chinaski ISBN 1-903110-23-8
- Ben Myers
  The Book of Fuck ISBN 1-903110-15-7
- Tony O'Neill
  Digging the Vein ISBN 1-903110-18-1
- Milner Place
  caminante ISBN 1-903110-12-2
- Eva Salzman
  ONE TWO II ISBN 1-903110-09-2
- Jules Smith
  ART, SURVIVAL AND SO FORTH: The Poetry of Charles Bukowski ISBN 1-903110-03-3
- Adam Strickson
  An Indian Rug surprised by Snow ISBN 978-1-903110-25-6
- Jon Smith
  Toytopia ISBN 1-903110-24-6

== Anthologies ==
- The Reater
- Reater 1 ISBN 1-903110-13-0
  New British writing with the best of Southern California: great names of L.A./Long Beach literature, with photographs by James Brown & Simon Rees.
- Reater 2 ISBN 1-903110-14-9
  Contributors include Seamus Curran, Joan Jobe Smith, Fred Voss, with artwork by Kevin Rudeforth.
- Reater 3 ISBN 1-903110-00-9
  Contributors include Simon Armitage, Geoff Hattersley, Labbi Siffre, Greta Stoddart, and the first ever published interview with Charles Bukowski (1963), with artwork by David Hernandez.
- Reater 4 ISBN 1-903110-02-5
  From the East Coast of Britain to the West Coast of the States; with accompanying CD of live readings by authors, and paintings by Jayne Jones.
- Reater 5 ISBN 1-903110-04-1
  Contributors include Sean Burn, Robert Nazarene, B. Z. Niditch and Rosemary Palmeira, with paintings by Dee Rimbaud.

== Awards and nominations ==
Nominated for The Forward Prize for Best First Collection

- Matthew Caley
  The Scene of my Former Triumph ISBN 1-903110-18-1
