= Jessica Andrews (disambiguation) =

Jessica Andrews is an American country music singer.

Jessica Andrews may also refer to:

- Jess Andrews, British long-distance runner
- Jessica Andrews (writer), British writer
- Jessica Andrews (character), character from The Karate Kid
