= Wizard's Way =

- Film poster
- Directed by: Metal Man
- Written by: Socrates Adams-Florou; Chris Killen; Joe Stretch
- Produced by: Electric Dynamite; Wizard's Way
- Starring: Socrates Adams-Florou; Sadie Frost; Joe Hartley
- Cinematography: Ismael Issa
- Edited by: Socrates Adams-Florou; Chris Killen; Chris Dickens; Tim Moss
- Production companies: Templeheart Films; Northern Girl Productions
- Release date: 25 January 2013
- Running time: 76 minutes
- Country: United Kingdom
- Language: English

Wizard's Way is a 2013 comedy film starring Socrates Adams-Florou, Sadie Frost, and Joe Hartley. The debut feature of a director known only as Metal Man, the comedic faux-documentary was shot on location in Manchester on a budget of £400.

== Plot ==
When a battered video camera is sold to a Manchester pawnshop, a remarkable tape is found inside. The film details the mundane lives of two friends, Barry Tubbulb and Julian "Windows" Andrews, as they attempt to live in the "real world" after their all-consuming passion - the on-line video game, Wizard's Way – is closed down. The plight of the two gamers and the insular world of multiplayer online gaming, is documented by two young film-makers, Joe (Joe Stretch) and Chris (Chris Killen), who hope to make an award-winning film about the gamers' social failure and the demise of Wizard's Way, an antiquated online multiplayer game with a rapidly dwindling fanbase. Even with Barry's guidance, the workings of the early-generation game remains somewhat obscure, involving Medieval wizards, dragons and various rural townsfolk competing for points in an extremely rudimentary game, characterized by poorly pixilated imagery, limited color options and painfully slow game action.

The film-makers are especially keen to find the game's undisputed master, known as "Windows," who happens to live in the same town. But before they can interview Windows, aka Julian, at home, they have to get past his overprotective flatmate Barry (Socrates Adams-Florou), a bearded layabout who lives and sleeps in the flat's bathroom. Barry warns them against disturbing Windows when he's "in-game", and hogs the camera to describe Wizard's Way and his friendship with Windows, whom he describes as being "the Michael Jackson of Wizard's Way - but alive."

When Windows (Kristian Scott) turns up, it's clear that he's a shy, ordinary guy who just likes to play video games for hours at a stretch. He doesn't seem keen on being interviewed, but puts up with the film makers - until their visits become too intrusive. As he begins to lose his grip on the project, Joe comes up with a few strategies to draw Windows from his shell, but he fails to anticipate the consequences his disruptive film making may have on the game's loyal fans.

== Cast ==
- Socrates Adams-Florou as Barry Tubbulb
- Sadie Frost as Escort
- Joe Hartley as Lee Woodend
- Chris Killen as Chris
- Marc Lunness as Marc
- Andrew Ross as Andrew
- Kristian Scott as Julian 'Windows' Andrews
- Joe Stretch as Joe
- Jessica Treen as Elen Edwards

== Reception ==
While acknowledging that the film's prankish perspective is hardly original, reviewers praised its offbeat characterizations, performances and a tone which teeters between aggrandized student film project and potential breakout cult documentary.

In 2014 it was announced that American actor Jack Black had acquired the rights to develop a remake of Wizard's Way.

== Awards ==
Wizard's Way was screened at London's BFI, as part of the LOCO LONDON comedy film festival 2013, which honoured the film with its Discovery Award. The film's multi-platform release in 2013, was accompanied by the release of a playable version of the lost classic game, Wizard's Way. The film also picked up the London Independent Film Festival 2012 award for Best Comedy feature film.
