= Brutalists =

Literary movement

Brutalism is a literary movement formed in 2006 by three writers from the north of England (Tony O'Neill, Adelle Stripe and Ben Myers).

The Brutalists are affiliated with the Offbeat generation in the UK, a loose association of like-minded writers working across different styles but united by their opposition to a mainstream publishing industry driven by marketing departments. Similar groupings known as Outsider or Outlawpoetry existed in North America and Europe, in independent publications often featuring brutalist poets or their associates and their forbears such as Charles Bukowski and Billy Childish. The British independent Blackheath Books published the brutalists and their circle in this period.

The movement was launched via the social networking site Myspace.

Brutalist works include Digging the Vein, Down and Out on Murder Mile, Seizure Wet Dreams, and Songs from the Shooting Gallery by Tony O'Neill, Some Things Are Better Left Unsaid and Cigarettes in Bed by Adelle Stripe, and The Book of Fuck, Richard: A Novel and Pig Iron by Ben Myers.

Their debut publication Nowhere Fast was released as a chapbook on Captains of Industry Press in 2007.

Brutalism 2 Cheap Thrills was released in summer 2009 as part of Mineshaft Magazine, where a new collection of Brutalist poems featured alongside unpublished work by Robert Crumb and Charles Bukowski.
