= Hillary Raphael =

American novelist (born 1976)

- Born: April 12, 1976 (age 50)
- Education: Hunter College (MFA)
- Occupation: Novelist
- Writing career
- Pen name: Hillary Raphael, Shoshana Banana

Hillary Raphael (born April 12, 1976) is an American novelist, fashion and children's book writer. She holds an MFA in Fiction from Hunter College in New York City.

== Works ==
At Hunter College Raphael won the MFA Thesis Prize for her novel, I Love Lord Buddha published by now defunct Creation Books. Raphael's books and mentorship inspired Nina-Marie Gardner to write Sherry & Narcotics. African Books Collective said “Her writing is akin to a poetic trance that manages to convey an unexpected and taunting fragile beauty.”

Raphael is also known for a non-fiction book about the Japanese butoh dance movement, Outcast Samurai Dancer, a collaboration with Japanese culture expert Donald Richie and photographer Meital Hershkovitz. Her novel Backpacker: New York, Seoul, Phnom Penh, Sapporo, Hong Kong, Vancouver, Mexico City, Maputo, Tokyo mon amour was published in 2007. Ximena followed in 2008 on her own Future Fiction London imprint.

Raphael wrote a photography essay in Torbjorn Rodland's White Planet, Black Heart. She also appears, without identification, as a model in the same book. Although Raphael wrote cult transgressive fiction under her own name, she expanded with a pseudonym.

Since 2014 Raphael writes and illustrates children's books under the name Shoshana Banana. Her debut title Family Ties was named one of the Best Jewish Children's Books of 2015 by Tablet Magazine. Her second children's book, Picture a Chinchilla, incorporates vintage textiles. Levi & Aya, published in 2016 debuted at #1 in its category on Amazon UK. Get Ready For My Mani-Pedi! followed in 2017.

In May 2020, during the COVID-19 lockdown, her pandemic fashion thriller PARIS LOVE SUICIDE was released. A vintage fashion collector and dealer, Raphael writes copy for numerous fashion companies in New York and Japan.

== Interviews ==
Interviews with Raphael feature in 3:AM Magazine, SuicideGirls, TORO MAGAZINE. and OVGuide.
