= Glenn Head =

American cartoonist

- Born: May 14, 1958 (age 68) Madison, New Jersey, U.S.
- Areas: Cartoonist, Artist, Editor

Glenn Head (born May 14, 1958 in Madison, New Jersey) is an American cartoonist and comic book editor living in Brooklyn, New York. His cartooning has a strong surrealist bent and is heavily influenced by 1960s underground comix.

Much of his work has appeared in comix anthologies, starting with Bad News 1, 2 and 3 (editors Paul Karasik and Mark Newgarden) and R. Crumb’s Weirdo magazine (#25). Head was a frequent contributor to the Fantagraphics quarterly comix anthology Zero Zero. His strip "Skateboard Mayhem" was featured in the Simon & Schuster anthology Mind Riot: Coming of Age in Comix.

Glenn Head’s comics and illustrations have appeared in a wide variety of publications, from The Wall Street Journal to Screw. Magazines and newspapers that have published his work include The New York Times, Playboy, New Republic, Sports Illustrated, Pulse Magazine, Advertising Age, Interview, Entertainment Weekly, Mineshaft (magazine), and Nickelodeon Magazine.

Head's solo work includes Avenue D, comix about life on the Lower East Side; two issues of Guttersnipe comix, which combine grunge, surrealism, and autobiography; and a self-published sketchbook character study, Head Shots.

From 2005 to 2010 Head edited and contributed to the Harvey- and Eisner Award-nominated anthology HOTWIRE Comics (three issues). From 2009 to 2015 he created his graphic epic, Chicago. This coming-of-age memoir centers around a starry-eyed 19-year-old with dreams of underground comics glory as he encounters his heroes, faces homelessness, despair, insanity, and somehow survives.

A student of Art Spiegelman at the School of Visual Arts in the early ‘80s (in the environment that created RAW), Head learned how to put comic books together. Head edited and contributed to three issues of Snake Eyes (with co-editor Kaz) and the pulp-crime underground comix anthology Hotwire Comix & Capers (numbers 1, 2 and 3).

== Awards ==
His work as an editor garnered the following attention:

- 1992 Harvey Award nomination for Best Anthology for Snake Eyes #2
- 2007 Eisner Award for Best Anthology nomination for Hotwire Comix
- 2007 Harvey Award for Best Anthology nomination for Hotwire Comix

== Exhibitions ==
Head's fine art has been exhibited in New York and across the country:

- 1993 "Comic Power" (Exit Art, New York City) traveling show
- 1997 "Art and Provocation: Images from Rebels" (Boulder Museum of Contemporary Art)
- 2000 "New York Press Illustrators Show" (CB’s 313 Gallery)

Head’s editorial cartooning appeared in the "Inx" show at Hofstra University.

== Bibliography ==
- "How I Spent My Summer on Avenue B" in Bad News #1, 1983, self-published, ASIN B00H6YCUSS — Bad News was a 1983–1988 comix anthology put together by Art Spiegelman’s SVA independent study class.
- "The Bugs" in Bad News #2, 1984, self-published, ASIN B004EL5XK8
- "Belinda’s Topless Go-Go Lounge" in Bad News #3, 1988, edited by Paul Karasik and Mark Newgarden, Bad News Press/Fantagraphics, ASIN B004X2X8D2.
- Weirdo #25, 1988, Last Gasp, edited by R. Crumb
- Glenn Head’s Avenue D: Comics & Stories, 1986, self-published, ASIN B000727IGK
- Avenue D, 1991, Fantagraphics, ASIN B00396SY4G
- Snake Eyes, 1990, Fantagraphics, ASIN B009E04P3K, ISBN 1560970588, ISBN 978-1560970583
- Snake Eyes #2, 1992, Fantagraphics, ISBN 1560970758, ISBN 978-1560970750
- Snake Eyes #3, 2001, Fantagraphics, ISBN 1560971258, ISBN 978-1560971252
- Zero Zero #1, 1995, Fantagraphics, ASIN B002ZD5IGG
- Zero Zero #2, 1995, Fantagraphics, ASIN B002ZDAYOW
- Zero Zero #3, 1995, Fantagraphics, ASIN B002ZDBD6A
- Zero Zero #6, 1995, Fantagraphics, ASIN B002ZDECJU
- Zero Zero #14, 1997, Fantagraphics, ASIN B00DCHV0OI
- Zero Zero #19, August 1997, Fantagraphics, ASIN B002ZF17RI
- Zero Zero #20, September/October 1997, Fantagraphics, ASIN B002ZF8ZX2
- Guttersnipe Comics #1, 1994, Fantagraphics, ASIN B000PBP9OQ
- Guttersnipe Comix #2, 1996, Fantagraphics, ASIN B006071WFE
- "Skateboard Mayhem!" in Mind Riot: Coming of Age in Comix, 1997, edited by Karen D. Hirsch ISBN 0689806221, ISBN 978-0689806223
- Dirty Stories Vol. 3, 2002, Fantagraphics, edited by Eric Reynolds
- True Porn #2, 2005, edited by Robyn Chapman
- Best Erotic Comics, 2008, Last Gasp, ISBN 978-0-86719-686-3
- Best Erotic Comics, 2009, Last Gasp, ISBN 978-0-86719-711-2
- Hotwire Comix and Capers Vol. 1, 2006, Fantagraphics, ISBN 1560977280, ISBN 978-1560977285
- Hotwire Comics, Vol. 2, 2008, Fantagraphics, ISBN 1560978910, ISBN 978-1560978916
- Hotwire, Vol. 3, 2010, Fantagraphics, ISBN 1606992880, ISBN 978-1606992883
- Chicago, A Comix Memoir By Glenn Head, 2015, Fantagraphics, ASIN B014VDFSL2, ISBN 978-1-60699-878-6
