= Chris Kelso =

British writer

Chris Kelso (born 22 March 1988, Kilmarnock, Scotland) is a Scottish fantasy writer, illustrator, and anthologist from Scotland.

Kelso's works have also been printed in magazines such as Interzone, Black Static, 3:AM, Locus, Bella Caledonia, The Scottish Poetry Library and Evergreen Review. He and Garrett Cook are the co-creators of 'The Imperial Youth Review'.

In 2019, he was nominated for a British Fantasy Award for best short fiction. His essay 'Transmigrational Defences' was nominated for a 2024 Pushcart Prize and his monograph on Andrzej Żuławski's Possession was nominated for a Rondo Hatton Classic Horror Award. His work has been praised by artists as wide and varied as Dennis Cooper and Samuel Delany, to Frankie Boyle and Tade Thompson.

Kelso is also a founding member of experimental spoken word band, Vantablack, with Nick Hudson and George Stuart Dahlquist from Sunn O))).

== Works ==
=== Fiction ===
- Last Exit to Interzone (Black Dharma Press)
- Schadenfreude (Dog Horn Publishing)
- A Message from the Slave State (Western Legends Books)
- Moosejaw Frontier (Bizarro Pulp Press)
- Transmatic (MorbidbookS)
- The Black Dog Eats the City (Omnium Gatherum)
- Terence, Mephisto and Viscera Eyes (Journalstone)
- The Dissolving Zinc Theatre (Villipede)
- The Folger Variation (Shoreline of Infinity)
- Wire & Spittle (Omnium Gatherum)
- Rattled by the Rush (Journalstone)
- The Church of Latter-Day Eugenics (with Tom Bradley)
- I Dream of Mirrors (The Sinister Horror Company)
- The DREGS Trilogy (Black Shuck Books)
- Voidheads (Schism)
- Metympsychosis (Feral Dove)

=== Non-Fiction ===
- Burroughs and Scotland: Dethroning the Ancients (Beatdom)
- Interrogating the Abyss (Apocalypse Party)
- On Melting: essays against the body (Control)
- Possession: dreams of suffering and sanity (PS Publishing)
- Shadowspheres (with Ewan Morrison)
- Casting the Circle (Dinkit)

=== Anthologies edited ===
- Caledonia Dreamin – Strange Fiction of Scottish Descent (by Chris Kelso and Hal Duncan)
- This is NOT an Anthology (Onieros Books)
- Slave Stories - Scenes of the Slave State (Omnium Gatherum)
- I Transgress (Salo' Press)
- Children of the New Flesh: The Early Films and Pervasive Influence of David Cronenberg (with David Leo Rice)
- The Mad Butterfly's Ball (with Preston Grassmann) (PS Publishing)

=== Collections ===
- Collected (2011-2026) (Shoreline of Infinity)
