= Bridget Phillipson =

British politician (born 1983)

The Right Honourable Bridget Phillipson MP
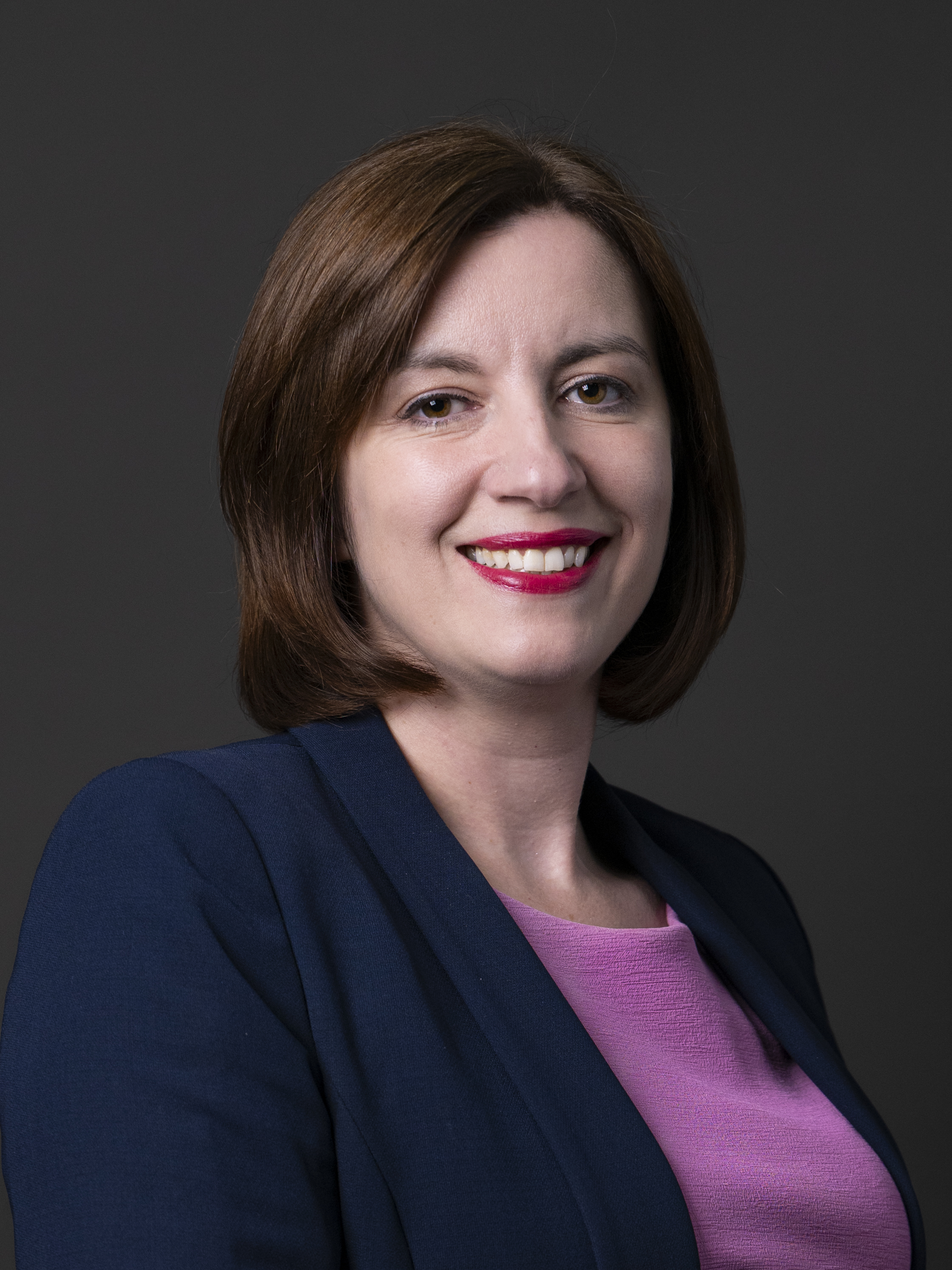
- Official portrait, 2026

Minister for Women and Equalities
- Incumbent
- Assumed office 8 July 2024
- Prime Minister: Keir Starmer; Andy Burnham
- Preceded by: Kemi Badenoch

Chair of the Labour Party
- Incumbent
- Assumed office 27 July 2026
- Leader: Andy Burnham
- Preceded by: Anna Turley

Secretary of State for Education
- In office 5 July 2024 – 20 July 2026
- Prime Minister: Keir Starmer
- Preceded by: Gillian Keegan
- Succeeded by: Lucy Powell
Shadow cabinet portfolios
2021–2024	Education
2020–2021	Chief Secretary to the Treasury

Member of Parliament for Houghton and Sunderland South
- Incumbent
- Assumed office 6 May 2010
- Preceded by: Constituency established
- Majority: 7,168 (17.9%)

Personal details
- Born: Bridget Maeve Phillipson; 19 December 1983 (age 42) Gateshead, Tyne and Wear, England
- Party: Labour
- Children: 2
- Education: Hertford College, Oxford (MA)
- Website: www.bridgetphillipson.com

Bridget Maeve Phillipson (born 19 December 1983) is a British politician who has served as Minister for Women and Equalities since 2024 and Chair of the Labour Party since July 2026. She previously served as Secretary of State for Education from 2024 to 2026. She has been the Member of Parliament (MP) for Houghton and Sunderland South since 2010.

Born in Gateshead, Phillipson attended St Robert of Newminster Catholic School. She went on to study at the University of Oxford before working in local government and then as a manager at Wearside Women in Need. Phillipson joined the Labour Party at the age of fifteen and was elected the co-chair of Oxford University Labour Club in 2003. She was elected to the House of Commons at the 2010 general election as MP for Houghton and Sunderland South. She was reelected at the 2015 general election and campaigned to remain in the European Union (EU) in the 2016 Brexit referendum. She was reelected in both the 2017 and 2019 general elections.

Phillipson endorsed Keir Starmer's successful campaign in the 2020 Labour leadership election and subsequently joined his shadow cabinet as Shadow Chief Secretary to the Treasury. In the November 2021 British shadow cabinet reshuffle, she was promoted to Shadow Education Secretary. After Labour's victory in the 2024 general election, Phillipson was appointed Secretary of State for Education and Minister for Women and Equalities in the Starmer cabinet. She stood in the 2025 deputy labour leadership election, but was defeated by Lucy Powell. After Andy Burnham became Prime Minister in 2026, Phillipson was replaced as Education Secretary by Powell but retained in Cabinet as Women and Equalities Minister, and later became Chair of the Labour Party.

== Early life and education ==
Bridget Maeve Phillipson was born on 19 December 1983 in Gateshead, Tyne and Wear, England. Her father walked out on her mother while pregnant with Bridget, and she has never met her biological father. Her mother is Clare Phillipson, who founded Wearside Women in Need in the late 1970s, a charity based in Sunderland which provides refuge for women affected by domestic violence.

Phillipson was raised in a council estate in Washington. Her mother signed her up for Saturday morning drama lessons at the local community centre, which led to her twice being an extra on the children's TV programme Byker Grove. She also learnt to play the violin. She attended St Robert of Newminster Catholic School, a state school in Washington. She went on to read modern history and modern languages (French) at Hertford College, University of Oxford, before specialising in history for her final exams. She joined Labour as a member at fifteen years old, and was elected co-chair of the Oxford University Labour Club in 2003. She graduated with an upper second-class honours Bachelor of Arts (BA) degree in 2005; her BA was promoted to a Master of Arts (MA Oxon) degree.

After university, she returned to the North East. She worked for two years in local government at Sunderland City Council, She was then a manager at Wearside Women in Need, the charity her mother founded, between 2007 and 2010.

== Parliamentary career ==
=== Backbencher ===
Phillipson was selected from an all-women shortlist as the Labour candidate for Houghton and Sunderland South in 2009. At the 2010 general election, Phillipson was elected as MP for Houghton and Sunderland South with 50.3% of the vote and a majority of 10,990. After entering parliament, she was appointed Parliamentary Private Secretary to Jim Murphy, who was then the shadow defence secretary. Between October 2013 and September 2015, she served as Opposition Whip in the House of Commons.

She was elected to the Home Affairs Committee in July 2010, and remained a member until November 2013. She was a member of the Public Bill Committee for the Defence Reform Act 2014, and of the Procedure Committee between July 2010 and October 2011. She has also been a member of the Speaker's Committee on the Electoral Commission since October 2010, and both the Committee on Standards and the Committee on Privileges since October 2017. She was a member of the Public Accounts Committee and the European Statutory Instruments Committee. From 2010 to 2015, she was secretary to the All-Party Parliamentary Group (APPG) on Domestic and Sexual Violence, which published the report "The Changing Landscape of Domestic and Sexual Violence Services" in February 2015.

At the 2015 general election, Phillipson was re-elected as MP for Houghton and Sunderland South with an increased vote share of 55.1% and an increased majority of 12,938.

In the 2016 Brexit referendum, she campaigned for a Remain vote, and in 2018 was one of the first Labour MPs to call for a referendum on any eventual deal with the EU.

She was again re-elected at the snap 2017 general election, with an increased vote share of 59.5% and a decreased majority of 12,341. At the 2019 general election, Phillipson was again re-elected, with a decreased vote share of 40.7% and a decreased majority of 3,115.

In Labour Party leadership elections, she voted for David Miliband in 2010, Yvette Cooper in 2015, Owen Smith in 2016, and Keir Starmer in 2020.

At the 2024 general election, Philipson was again re-elected, with an increased vote share of 47.1% and an increased majority of 7,169.

=== Opposition frontbencher (2020–2024) ===
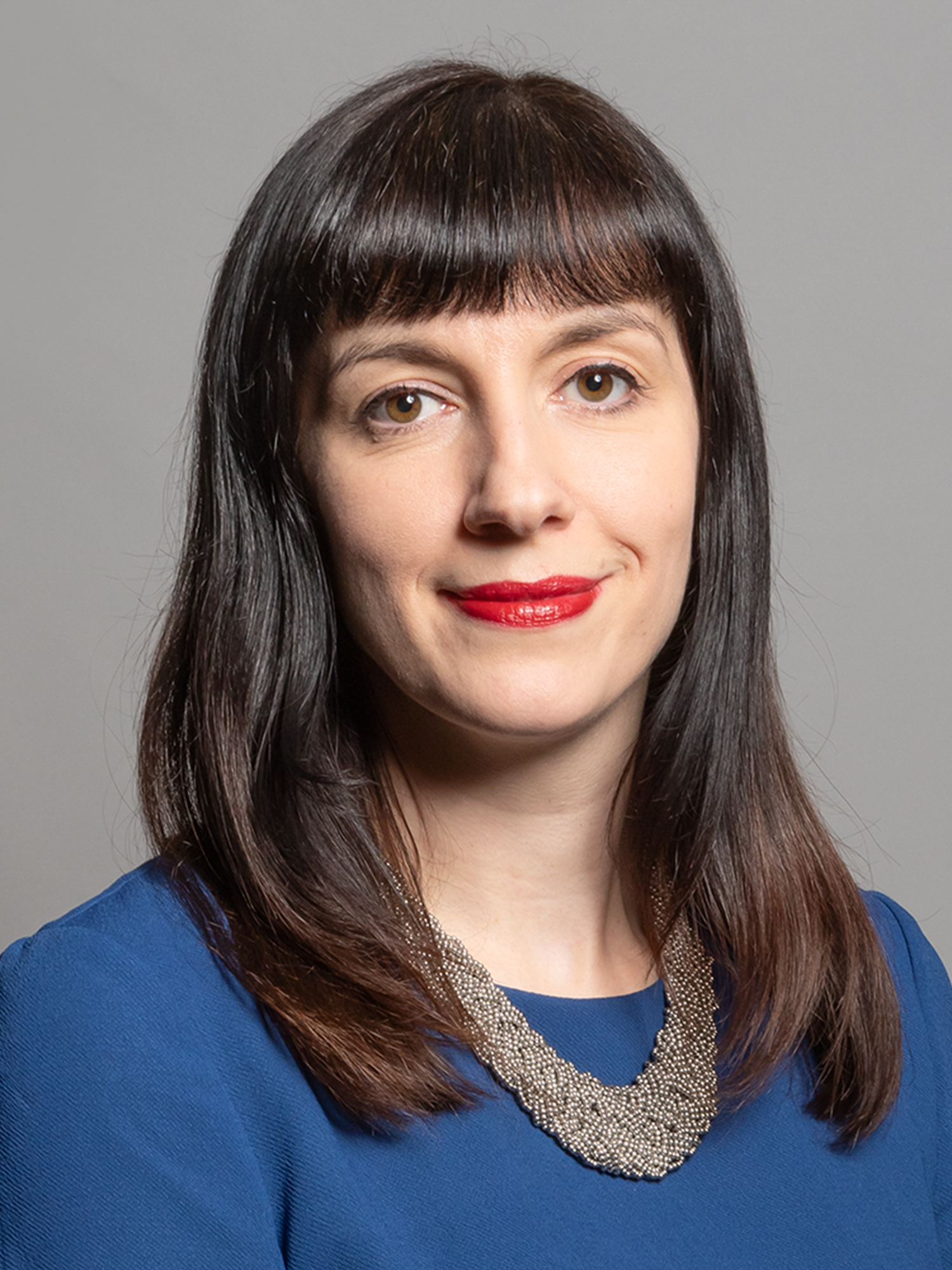
Official portrait as MP, 2020

Following Keir Starmer's leadership election victory in April 2020, Phillipson was appointed to the Shadow Cabinet for the first time, as Shadow Chief Secretary to the Treasury. She served in that role under successive Shadow Chancellors Anneliese Dodds and Rachel Reeves. On 29 November 2021 she was moved to the role of Shadow Secretary of State for Education, responsible for Labour's education policy in England.

As shadow secretary of state for education, Phillipson set out Labour's plans for reform of the childcare and wider education systems, starting with plans for funded breakfast clubs for every primary school child in every school in England. She called for reform of Ofsted, the inspectorate of school standards in England, to move away from simplistic one-word summary overall judgements, the imposition of VAT on private schools to fund thousands more teachers in England's schools, a full curriculum and assessment review, including a focus on weaving speaking and listening skills through the curriculum, new incentives to retain teachers in the classroom, two weeks' worth of compulsory work experience for all young people, and improved access to careers guidance and mental health in schools.

She spoke and wrote extensively about the particular importance of childcare for children, parents and families, and the need for a system that stretches from the end of parental leave to the end of primary school. She confirmed that the next Labour government would not abolish tuition fees altogether, and called for far-reaching changes to the skills system in England, including the creation of a new body to be called 'Skills England', devolution of skills and adult education budgets, and greater flexibility with the existing Apprenticeship Levy.

=== Cabinet career (2024–present) ===
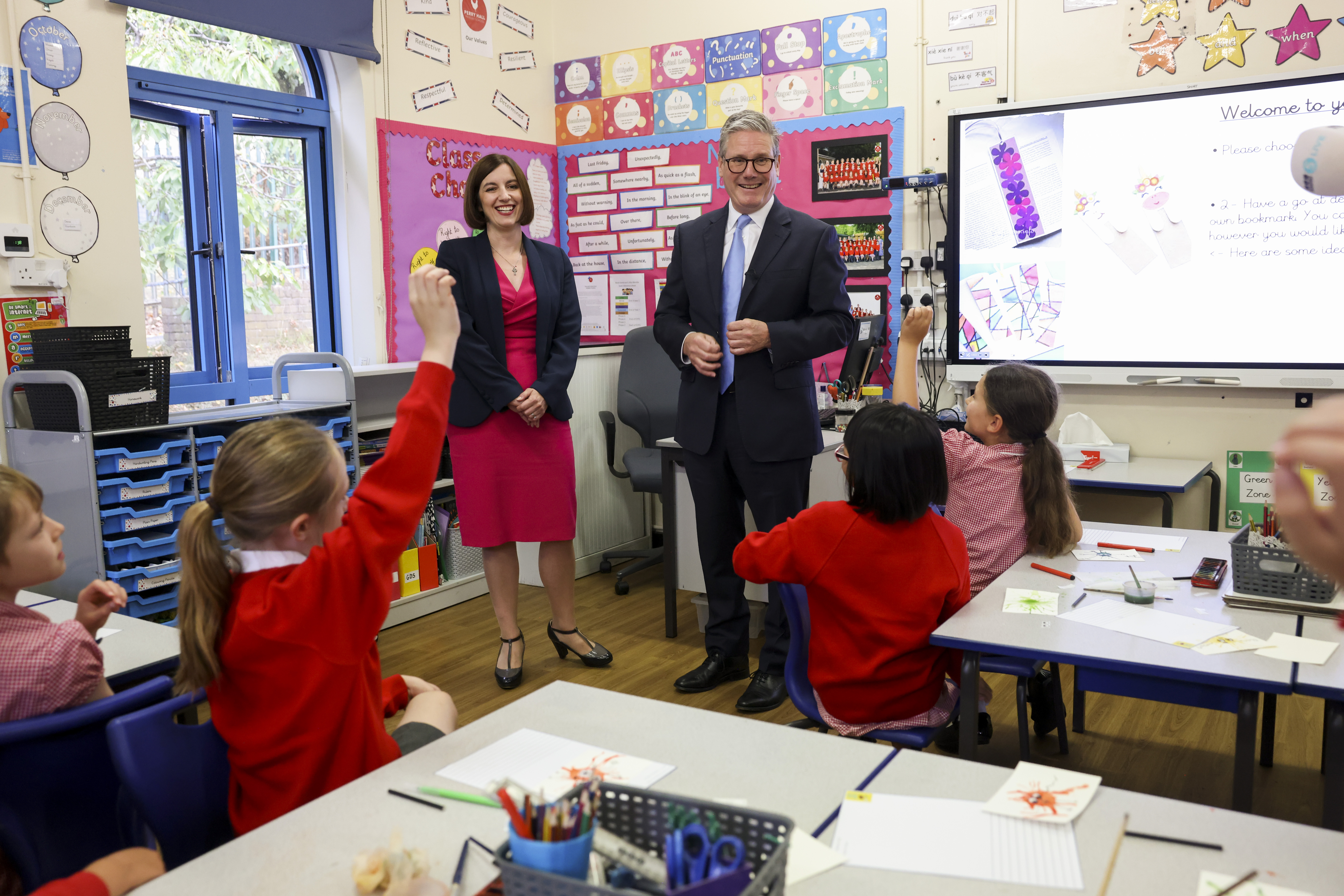
Phillipson visiting a primary school in Orpington with Prime Minister Keir Starmer

Following the Labour landslide victory in the 2024 general election, Phillipson was appointed as the Secretary of State for Education by Prime Minister Keir Starmer in the lead-up to the formation of the next government on 5 July. She was also appointed Minister for Women and Equalities on 8 July, with Anneliese Dodds as her junior minister. Phillipson was sworn of the Privy Council on 10 July 2024, entitling her to be styled "The Right Honourable" for life.

During her tenure, she has emphasised compliance with legal standards on single-sex spaces following a Supreme Court ruling, urging employers not to delay implementation in the absence of updated guidance.

In her ministerial role, she has been linked to government policies targeting educational inequalities and child poverty, including initiatives related to the two-child benefit cap and support services for disadvantaged families.

On 9 September 2025, Phillipson put her name forward as a candidate for the deputy leadership of the Labour Party. She gained nominations from 175 Labour MPs to go through to the next round against Lucy Powell following the close of nominations from the Parliamentary Labour Party on 11 September 2025. Powell defeated Phillipson on 25 October.

On 20 July 2026, Andy Burnham retained Phillipson in Cabinet as Women and Equalities Minister, but she lost her position as Education Secretary to Lucy Powell, which was reported in the media as a demotion. On 27 July, she was appointed Chair of the Labour Party. She announced the first ever UK funding of £15m to address anti-misogyny attitudes including sexist comments and harassment at work in September 2026.

== Controversies ==
During the 2024 Labour Party freebies controversy, Sky News reported that Phillipson had received a £14,000 gift from Lord Alli. At the 2024 Labour Party Conference, Phillipson told ITN that she had accepted free Taylor Swift tickets, because "it was a hard one to turn down... one of my children was keen to go".

After the treasury minister, James Murray, rejected calls to delay the introduction of VAT on private school fees in October 2024, Phillipson was criticised by multiple MPs after she posted on X "Our state schools need teachers more than private schools need embossed stationery. Our children need mental health support more than private schools need new pools. Our students need careers advice more than private schools need AstroTurf pitches." Conservative MP Graham Stuart described her post as "malicious and spiteful", and called for an apology. Opposition whip, Luke Evans, said the post "reeks of prejudice and propagates a class war” and shadow treasury minister, Nigel Huddleston, said of it "Parents who send their children to independent schools, who pay twice on their children’s education, deserve better than to be treated with contempt by their government’s education secretary."

== Political positions ==
=== Constituency campaigns ===
Phillipson has campaigned successfully on a number of local issues, including forcing a government U-turn on the rebuilding of Hetton School in Hetton-le-Hole, after plans to do so were cancelled by the Conservative-led government in 2010. The school was eventually rebuilt and reopened in 2016.

She also led a campaign to improve standards and affordability of bus transport in Tyne and Wear, calling for the development of a quality contract scheme to be run by Nexus, the passenger transport executive for the North East Combined Authority. The government-appointed review board eventually refused permission for Nexus to advance the scheme.

=== LGBT issues ===
As Minister for Women and Equalities, in April 2025 Phillipson said that trans women should not use women's toilets. This was in response to a UK Supreme Court ruling on the definition of man and woman in the Equality Act.

=== Foreign policy ===
Phillipson was previously listed as a supporter of Labour Friends of Israel, though the group no longer discloses which MPs are members.

According to Declassified UK, the pro-Israel lobby has donated £60,000 to Phillipson and the "pro-Israel tycoon, former hedge fund manager Stuart Roden" has donated "£80,000 supporting the office costs of Phillipson and Lisa Nandy".

=== Statement on single-sex spaces ruling ===
In February 2026, Bridget Phillipson, serving as the United Kingdom’s Minister for Women and Equalities, stated that employers should implement a recent Supreme Court of the United Kingdom ruling concerning single-sex spaces and should not delay action pending further guidance. In September 2026, she said that she believed that women's refuges should only be run by, and used by, biological women.

== Personal life ==
Phillipson met her husband, Lawrence, in Newcastle upon Tyne after she graduated from the University of Oxford, and they married in 2009. They have two children. She is a Roman Catholic.

Parliament of the United Kingdom
New constituency	Member of Parliament for Houghton and Sunderland South; 2010–present	Incumbent
Political offices
Preceded by Peter Dowd	Shadow Chief Secretary to the Treasury; 2020–2021	Succeeded by Pat McFadden
Preceded by Kate Green	Shadow Secretary of State for Education; 2021–2024	Succeeded by Damian Hinds
Preceded by Gillian Keegan	Secretary of State for Education; 2024–2026	Succeeded by Lucy Powell
Preceded by Kemi Badenoch	Minister for Women and Equalities; 2024–present	Incumbent
