= Sairish Hussain =

- Born: Bradford, England
- Education: University of Huddersfield

Sairish Hussain is a British novelist and lecturer in creative writing. Her debut novel The Family Tree (2020) was shortlisted for a Costa Book Award and the Portico Prize. This was followed by Hidden Fires (2024). In her writing, she is known for her portrayals of British-Pakistani families.

== Early life and education ==
Hussain is from Bradford and attended Rhodesway Secondary School. She graduated with a Bachelor of Arts (BA) from the University of Huddersfield. As she received a first, she earned a scholarship to continue her studies at Huddersfield onto a Master of Arts (MA) and PhD. She has since lectured at the university as a research fellow in creative writing.

== Career ==
Hussain first came up with the idea for her debut novel about a British-Pakistani Muslim family, centred around a recently widowed single father Amjad and his two children Saahil and Zahra, during her final undergraduate year in 2014, began writing it during her MA, and completed it while pursuing her PhD. Shortly after at a 2017 Bradford Literature Festival, she met Lisa Milton of HarperCollins, who expressed interest in the novel, through which Hussain secured her first book deal with the imprint HQ. Her motivation with the novel, titled The Family Tree and published in 2020, was to challenge stereotypes and portray a realistic family. For example, The Family Tree depicts a positive father–daughter relationship, which Hussain found rare in media.

The Family Tree was shortlisted for the Portico Prize, given to novels that "evoke the spirit of the North", and the Costa Book Award for First Novel. The novel was also longlisted for The Guardian's Not the Booker Prize, shortlisted at the Diverse Book (DB) Awards in the Adult category, and named a Hidden Gem by Calibre Audio.

For the National Centre for Writing in June 2021, Kei Miller named Hussain on his list of the UK's 10 best emerging writers. She was then selected as a finalist for the 2022 Women's Prize x Good Housekeeping Futures Award.

As confirmed in September 2023, Hussain reunited with the HarperCollins imprint HQ for the publication of her second novel Hidden Fires in January 2024. The novel, about a British-Pakistani teenager Rubi who goes to stay with her grandfather Yusuf, is set in 2017 amid the backdrop of the Grenfell Tower fire and the 70th anniversary of the Partition of India. When conducting research on the Partition, Hussain found the elderly men in the documentaries she watched reminded her of her own grandfather. In both her novels, Hussain "humanises" the British-Pakistani community through counter-narratives.

== Personal life ==
Hussain lives in Bradford. She has also worked as a healthcare assistant on the sonography team of a local maternity unit.

== Bibliography ==
- The Family Tree (2020)
- Hidden Fires (2024)
