= Bluemoose Books =

Book publisher in Yorkshire, England

- Founded: 2006; 19 years ago
- Founders: Kevin and Hetha Duffy
- Country of origin: England
- Headquarters location: Hebden Bridge, West Yorkshire
- Publication types: Books
- Official website: bluemoosebooks.com

Bluemoose Books is an independent publisher based in Hebden Bridge, West Yorkshire, England. It was founded in 2006 by Kevin and Hetha Duffy. Kevin Duffy has said that the name was inspired by the Blue Pig pub at nearby Hardcastle Crags and the saxophone player Bull Moose Johnson who featured in Peter Guralnick's Sweet Soul Music.

It has published award-winning titles including Benjamin Myers' 2012 Pig Iron, first winner of the Gordon Burn Prize.

The company decided to publish only books by women during the year 2020, hoping to shine a spotlight on the work of older or not-yet-established female authors, who face being sidelined because of the publishing industry's usual focus on youth and celebrity. The selected authors were Heidi James, Anna Chilvers and Sharon Duggal

Publishing no more than 10 titles a year, Bluemoose was the North England winner in the 2023 Small Press of the Year awards. The same winning position was repeated in 2025.

The publisher is setting up a Centre of Publishing Excellence as a joint venture with UCLan Publishing in spring 2025.
