= Milner Place =

English writer (1930–2020)

Milner Place (25 January 1930 – 28 May 2020) was an English writer best known for his poetry. He was born in Thirsk, North Yorkshire to Dorothy F. Place and Tom Place. He had three siblings, Ullin, Dorothy and David. His brother Ullin Place was well known for his work on consciousness as a process of the brain. His sister, Dorothy E. Smith was a sociologist.

== Life and career ==
Early in his life he worked as a forester. From 1948 to 1950 he served in the military, he then studied briefly at an agricultural college, worked as a bartender and managed the family farm. Place lived much of his life on the sea. In 1953 he sailed to South Africa where he worked in a copper mine. In 1955 he returned to England and worked as a journalist. In 1958 he sailed to New York City and from 1958 to 1961 lived in the Bahamas.

In 1961, he bought his first ship and sailed it through Miami and England to Mallorca. During the Algerian War, he was a smuggler. The years 1962 and 1963 he spent in Bilbao and Madrid. In 1965 he captained a sailing ship built in the Netherlands to Lisbon. In the following years he drove several ocean races with Juan Carlos the future King of Spain. In 1966 in Denmark he turned a barge into a yacht and in 1967 and 1968 he ran a yacht charter in Malta for wedding couples and regularly sailed the route via Lampedusa and Tunisia. In 1969 he was a consultant for Forte International Hotels in Sardinia and Greece before he organized a fishing fleet in Ecuador. Shortly thereafter, he fled to Peru on charges of alleged piracy. He then worked for the Manu River Project and for similar projects in Brazil and Panama. In 1971 he returned to England before working for time in the Canary Islands as a photographer. In 1973 he traveled to Mexico to write an ultimately unpublished novel. While struggling with the novel he took up poetry as a relief from working on the novel.

Place was an editor for Poetry Circle, a forum for contemporary poetry in the United States.

In 1976 he moved with his partner, Dorothy, and the stepson, Paul, to Mallorca. He died in Huddersfield, England in May 2020, at the age of 90.

== Works ==
He wrote his first poems in Mallorca in Spanish. After his settlement in Huddersfield / UK in 1987, he began to write poetry in English.

- En Busca de mi Alma, published in Spanish 1977
- In a rare time of rain, Chatto & Windus
- The confusion of the Anglers, Wide Skirt Press
- Where smoke is, Wide Skirt Press
- Piltdown Man & Bat Woman, Spout publications
- The City of Flowers, Spout publications
- Caminante, Wrecking Ball Press
- Certain matters, Lapwing Publications, Belfast
- Odersfelt, Flux Gallery Press
- Naked Invitation, Lapwing Publications, Belfast
- Joe & Maisie Fay / Maisie Fay & Joe, PigeonBike, Canada, 2011
- The man who had forgotten the name of trees 2013, and The Road to Alta Mira 2018, Moloko print, each with drawings by Harald Häuser

He also wrote plays for BBC Radio 3 and 4 and was featured in the show Bookworm in the BBC1 television.
