= Clare Phillipson =

- Occupations: CEO and founder of Wearside Women in Need
- Children: Bridget Phillipson

Clare Phillipson is a British person who founded Wearside Women in Need and led it for over 35 years. The charity operated four houses and it was involved with an innovative partnership with the police which supported the victims of domestic abuse. In 2025 the charity had over 50 employees.

== Life ==
Phillipson lived in Washington in the Tyne and Wear area. She was a single parent and she looked after her daughter until she started school. Her daughter later said that her mother would have liked to work but the cost of paying for childcare meant that she could not afford to work. In 1990 Phillipson bought her council house gaining a discount due to the government's Right to Buy scheme.

Philippson was concerned after she was attacked while walking home. She was annoyed to find out that other women had been attacked at the same place as she was. She wrote to the local paper asking if there were anybody else who want to do something about this abuse. The replies were the start of what became Washington Women in Need. She is credited as the charity's founder, which was founded in 1983.

In 2012 she complained publicly about local libraries wasting money in buying copies of "Fifty Shades of Grey". She declared the book to be vile as it presented that "domestic violence is sexy". She thought the money would be better spent in supporting victims, although the council noted that the sadomasochism portrayed in the book was consensual. Phillipson invited people to give her copies of the book so that she could burn them.

Her charity were involved with an innovative partnership with the local police. She was one of the charity's workers who went out with the police when they were called to domestic disputes. The police might be involved with investigating an attack and it was her role to support the victim. This may involve arranging for that person to be given a place at a women's refuge. This was an unusual step as historically Phillipson had little confidence in the police, but the Police commissioner was supporting this work despite a shortage of funding.

After 35 years she was leading Wearside Women in Need. The charity cost a million pounds per annum and it supported workers and four houses that served as women's refuges. The BBC reported that its funding was cancelled by the local council in 2017. Phillipson said that funding cuts meant that the system was at "breaking point" and she had to spend time deciding who to turn away as the beds and settees were full. However, in 2025 the charity had nearly 60 employees and an annual turnover of over two million pounds. One of the employees earned more than £60,000.
