= Gavin James Bower =

British writer, lecturer and editor

- Born: Gavin James Bower; 28 October 1982 (age 43); Lancashire, England

Gavin James Bower (born 28 October 1982, in Lancashire) is a British writer, lecturer and editor. His first novel, Dazed & Aroused, was published by Naim Attallah's Quartet Books in July 2009.

Graduating from the University of Sheffield with a BA in History in 2004, he then interned at Dazed & Confused magazine in London and subsequently joined modelling agencies in London, Paris and Milan, taking part in Paris Fashion Week shows for John Galliano and Hermes.

He has contributed to the Guardian, 3:AM Magazine and the Sunday Telegraph.

His second novel, Made in Britain, was published in September 2011.

In 2014 he joined the writing team for EastEnders, with his first episode being broadcast on 9 September.

== Bibliography ==
- 2009 – Dazed & Aroused (Quartet Books)
- 2011 – Made in Britain (Quartet Books)
- 2013 – Claude Cahun - The Soldier with No Name (Zero Books)
