= Tom Bradley (author) =

American novelist, essayist, and writer

- Bradley in 2007
- Born: Thomas Iver Bradley; March 17, 1954 (age 72); Utah, U.S.
- Occupations: Novelist; essayist; short story writer
- Website: tombradley.org

Thomas Iver Bradley (born March 17, 1954) is an American novelist, essayist and writer of short stories. He is the author of The Sam Edwine Pentateuch, a five-book series, of which various volumes have been nominated for the Editor's Book Award, the New York University Bobst Prize, and the AWP Award Series in the Novel. Tom Bradley's nonfiction is regularly featured by Arts & Letters Daily, and has also appeared in Salon.com, McSweeney's Internet Tendency, and Ambit Magazine. He has been characterized as an "outsider" by the LA Times book blog.

His sixth book, Fission Among the Fanatics, was named Non-Fiction Book of the Year 2007 by 3:AM Magazine, with the citation, a literary giant among pygmies. NPR commentator Andrei Codrescu called the book "the first appearance of a genre so strange we are turning away from naming it..." The publication of his seventh book, Lemur, by Raw Dog Screaming Press is part of the Bizarro fiction movement. According to The Advocate, "[Lemur] could do as much to raise the rainbow flag as two medium-size Midwestern Stonewall Day parades." Tom Bradley has meanwhile contributed to the theoretical elucidation of the Bizarro aesthetic with his criticism and his interviews. His eighth novel, Vital Fluid, is based on the life, writings and performances of stage hypnotist John-Ivan Palmer and was published by Crossing Chaos Enigmatic Ink.

His twentieth book, Family Romance (illustrated by Nick Patterson), is forthcoming from Debra Di Blasi's Jaded Ibis Press, described by Forbes magazine as a "hotpoint where the novel is undergoing radical transformation to reflect its time."

== Biography ==
Tom Bradley was born in Utah during a time when hydrogen bomb tests were still performed above ground. Later, he lived in the People's Republic of China for many years and lost friends in the Tiananmen Square Massacre.

The author has stated that as an unintended victim of US nuclear testing, he gravitated to Hiroshima and Nagasaki, where he has written strident criticisms of the Japanese educational system In the opinion of Israeli journalist Barry Katz, who writes for 3:AM Magazine in Paris, Tom Bradley deliberately courts controversy: "He does seem bent on leaving absolutely nobody unpissed-off. His venom’s no less ecumenical than gratuitous." Rain Taxi Review of Books expresses the notion as follows: "As proof of his leaving no one un-offended, he's been nudged out of every university where he has taught. For the past two decades he has lived the life of an ex-pat laugh assassin, tucked away in a volcanic mountain on the island of Kyushu".

However, in composing the Critical Appendix for Fission Among the Fanatics, The Advocate writer Cye Johan arrived at a different conclusion: "I tell you that Dr. Bradley has devoted his existence to writing because he intends for every center of consciousness, everywhere, in all planes and conditions (not just terrestrial female Homo sapiens in breeding prime), to love him forever, starting as soon as possible, though he's prepared to wait thousands of centuries after he's dead".

He claims paternal descent from Mormon handcart pioneers who were excommunicated almost immediately upon arriving in Deseret, from whom he inherited his "whole hefty metabolism" and his remarkable height. 3:AM Magazine describes him as "sociopathically tall." He also claims to have descended maternally from an earlier Nagasaki expatriate, Thomas Blake Glover.

Regarding the question of the extent to which his fictional alter-ego, Sam Edwine, is autobiographical, Tom Bradley has written that while the character is more intelligent and has had a great variety of experiences that he has not, they are essentially alike.

== Selected works ==
=== Nonfiction ===
- Put It Down in a Book, The Drill Press, 2009
- Fission Among the Fanatics, Spuyten Duyvil Books (NYC), 2007

(Both recipients of the 3:AM Magazine Non-Fiction Book of the Year Award)

- Felicia's Nose (illustrated by Nick Patterson), Mad Hat Press, 2012
- My Hands Were Clean, Unlikely Books, 2010
- Epigonesia (with Kane X. Faucher), Blaze Vox Books, 2010
- New Cross Musings on a Manic Reality (editor), Dog Horn Publishing, 2011

=== Fiction ===
- The Church of Latter-day Eugenics (with Chris Kelso), Bizarro Pulp Press, 2017
- Family Romance (illustrated by Nick Patterson), Jaded Ibis Press, 2012
- A Pleasure Jaunt With One of the Sex Workers Who Don't Exist in the People's Republic of China, NeoPoiesis Books, 2012
- Bomb Baby, Enigmatic Ink, 2010
- Hemorrhaging Slave of an Obese Eunuch, Dog Horn Publishing, 2010
- Calliope's Boy, Black Rainbows Press, 2010
- Vital Fluid, Crossing Chaos, 2009
- Even the Dog Won't Touch Me, Ahadada Books, 2009
- Lemur, Raw Dog Screaming Press, 2008
- Acting Alone: a novel of nuns, neo-Nazis and NORAD, Browntrout Books, 1995; 2nd ed., Drill Press, 2010
