= St Robert of Newminster Catholic School =

St. Robert of Newminster Roman Catholic School

Location
- Biddick Lane, Biddick; Washington; City of Sunderland, Tyne and Wear, NE38 8AF; England; 54.88815°N 1.5212°W

Information
- Type: Academy
- Motto: 'Sic Luceat Lux Vestra' - 'Let your light shine.'
- Religious affiliation: Roman Catholic
- Local authority: Sunderland City Council
- Trust: Bishop Wilkinson Catholic Education Trust
- Department for Education URN: 147142 Tables
- Ofsted: Reports
- Headteacher: Rachael Gundlach
- Gender: Co-educational
- Age: 11 to 18
- Houses: Finchale, Whitby, Durham and Lindisfarne
- Colours: Finchale - blue, Whitby - green, Durham - red and Lindisfarne - yellow
- Website: http://strobertofnewminster.co.uk/

St Robert of Newminster Catholic School is a co-educational secondary school and sixth form located in Washington in the City of Sunderland, Tyne and Wear, England. The school is named after Saint Robert of Newminster. As a Catholic school it is under the jurisdiction of the Roman Catholic Diocese of Hexham and Newcastle.

Previously a voluntary aided school administered by Sunderland City Council, in July 2019 St Robert of Newminster Catholic School converted to academy status. The school is now sponsored by Bishop Wilkinson Catholic Education Trust.

St Robert of Newminster Catholic School offers GCSEs and BTECs as programmes of study for pupils, while students in the sixth form have the option to study a range of A Levels and further BTECs.

== Notable former pupils ==
- Jordan Pickford, goalkeeper for Everton and England
- Ethan Robson, footballer
- Jessica Andrews, author and lecturer
- Paul Coughlin, cricketer
- Bridget Phillipson, Labour Party Member of Parliament (MP) for Houghton and Sunderland South (2010–present)
- Si King, Hairy Bikers member
- Paul Thirlwell, footballer
- Carl Magnay, footballer
- Matthew Potts, cricketer
- Rebecca Welch, Referee
- Paul Mullen, musician

== Conviction of headteacher ==
In 2025, the BBC reported that the former headteacher, Dean Juric, had pleaded guilty to "downloading and distributing indecent images of children including teenage girls" He was caught by an undercover police officer whilst he was in charge of the school, being found with 380 illegal images. The trust immediately suspended him, issuing a replacement. Juric, who was previously "asked what turned him on and he replied: 'Schoolgirl'" according to ITV, was later given a suspended sentence.
