= Sally J. Morgan =

New Zealand artist and art historian

Sally Morgan
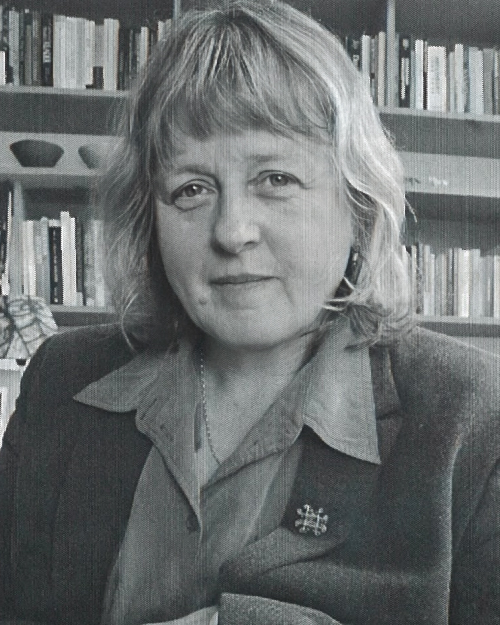
- Morgan in 2005
- Born: Abertillery

Academic background
- Education: University of Warwick, Sheffield Hallam University, Royal Academy of Fine Arts, Ruskin College
- Academic advisor: Raphael Samuel

Sally J. Morgan is a New Zealand artist and historian, and is a Distinguished Professor and Professor Emeritus at the Massey University. Morgan's research focuses on socially-engaged art practices. She was awarded the Massey University Research Medal in 2016, and her novel Toto Among the Murderers won the 2022 Portico Prize.

== Academic career ==
Morgan was born in Abertyleri in Wales and grew up in Yorkshire. She completed a Master of Arts in history at Ruskin College, and also has a Bachelor of Arts with Honours from Sheffield College of Art (now Sheffield Hallam University). Morgan trained further in fine arts at the Royal Academy of Fine Art in Antwerp, and earned a Master of Arts from the University of Warwick.

Morgan's research focuses on socially-engaged art practices. She is a performance and installation artist, and her pieces have been exhibited in the UK, USA, Europe, Brazil, Japan, Bulgaria and New Zealand, and at international festivals including the National Review of Live Art, and the Belluard Bollwerk International Festival in Switzerland.

Morgan then joined the faculty of Massey University, rising to full professor in 2001 and Distinguished Professor in 2016. From 2004 to 2012 she served as the Pro-Vice Chancellor of the College of Creative Arts.

== Awards and honours ==
Morgan was awarded Massey's highest research honour in 2016, the Massey University Research Medal.

Morgan's first novel, Toto Among the Murderers, published by John Murray Press in 2020, was inspired by an encounter Morgan had when hitchhiking as a student, although she did not realise until decades later that the people offering her a ride were Fred and Rosemary West. The novel won the Portico Prize in 2022.

== Personal life ==
Morgan lives in Berhampore, Wellington with her wife, British writer and artist Jess Richards.

== Selected works ==
- Morgan, Sally J. (2020). Toto Among the Murderers. John Murray Press. ISBN 9781529300390.
- Morgan, Sally (2001). "Heritage Noire: truth, history, and colonial anxiety in The Blair Witch Project". International Journal of Heritage Studies. 7 (2): 137–148. doi:10.1080/13527250120060178. Wikidata Q58516516.
- Gough, Paul James; Morgan, Sally (2013). "'A Faux Cenotaph': Guerilla Interventions and the Contestation of Rhetorical Public Space". Journal of War and Culture Studies. 6 (1). doi:10.1179/1752627212z.0000000007. Wikidata Q57475162.
- Morgan, Sally (2001). "A Terminal Degree: fine art and the PhD". Journal of Visual Art Practice. 1 (1): 6–15. ISSN 1470-2029. Wikidata Q130270727.
- Morgan, Sally (1998). "Memory and the merchants: Commemoration and civic identity". International Journal of Heritage Studies. 4 (2): 103–113. doi:10.1080/13527259808722225. Wikidata Q58575417.
- Fleming, Jean Sutherland; Gibson, Rosemary Helen; Harris, Brent; Morgan, Sally; Noble, Anne Lysbeth; O'Keeffe, Karyn Maree; Anna Wirz-Justice; Sam Trubridge; Gander, Philippa Helen (2011). "The "Waking Incubator": Exploring the Interface Between the Performing Arts and the Science of Sleep". The international journal of science in society. 2 (3): 291–308. doi:10.18848/1836-6236/cgp/v02i03/51269. Wikidata Q130278129.
- P. Gough; S. Morgan (2004). "Manipulating the metonymic: the politics of civic identity and the Bristol Cenotaph, 1919–1932". Journal of Historical Geography. 30 (4): 665–684. doi:10.1016/s0305-7488(03)00002-1. Wikidata Q130278130.
- Morgan, Sally (2003). "Beautiful impurity: British contextualism as processual postmodern practice". Journal of Visual Art Practice. 2 (3): 135–144. doi:10.1386/jvap.2.3.135/0. Wikidata Q130278131.
- Morgan, Sally (1999). "The ghost in the luggage: Wallace and Braveheart: post-colonial 'pioneer' identities". European Journal of Cultural Studies. 2 (3): 375–392. doi:10.1177/136754949900200305. Wikidata Q130278133.
- Morgan, Sally (1989). "Beyond the Aesthetic Adventurer: Public Art & Education". Circa (45): 16. doi:10.2307/25557412. Wikidata Q130278134.
