= 3:AM Magazine =

Literary magazine

- Website type: Consumer
- Available in: English
- Owner: Andrew Gallix
- Creator: Kent Wilson
- Website: 3ammagazine.com/3am
- Launched: April 2000; 26 years ago
- Current status: Online

3:AM Magazine is a literary magazine, which was set up as 3ammagazine.com in April 2000 and is edited from Paris, France. Its editor-in-chief since inception has been Andrew Gallix, a lecturer at the Sorbonne.

3:AM features literary criticism, nonfiction essays, original fiction, poetry, and interviews with leading writers and philosophers. Its slogan is: "Whatever it is, we're against it."

== History ==
The magazine was launched in 2000. In 2004, the editors unsuccessfully tried to prevent the Daily Mirror newspaper from publishing a short-lived 3am Magazine supplement based around its 3am Girls gossip column. The site was called "irreverently highbrow" by Heather Stewart in The Observer, and described as aiming to be "an online Fitzrovia" by Lilian Pizzichini in The Daily Telegraph. Boyd Tonkin, in The Independent, described it as keeping "faith with the old little-review tradition of avant-garde provocation and seditious literary cheek" and Inés Martin Rodrigo, in Spanish daily ABC, likened it to an "Offbeats' New Yorker".

An anthology covering its first five years of publishing, The Edgier Waters, was published in Britain by Snowbooks in June 2006, featuring writers Steve Almond, Bruce Benderson, Michael Bracewell, Tom Bradley, Billy Childish, Steven Hall, Ben Myers, Tim Parks, Mark Simpson, HP Tinker and Kenji Siratori, as well as poetry pieces arranged by Sonic Youth's Thurston Moore and Lee Ranaldo alongside Tyondai Braxton.

A volume of city-themed fiction, 3:AM London, Paris, New York, followed in 2008 and featured Henry Baum, Chris Cleave, Niven Govinden, Laura Hird, Toby Litt, Lee Rourke, Nicholas Royle, Matt Thorne and Evie Wyld.

In July 2012 the site was temporarily offline due to an issue with its server provider.

In 2014, a book-length collection of 3:AM's popular "End Times" interviews of notable philosophers (as conducted by Richard Marshall) was published by Oxford University Press with a further volume following in 2017.

3:AM was listed as being among the top 25 websites for literature lovers by Jason Diamond in Flavorwire in 2013. and as being among Mark Thwaite's 5 favourite literary blogs in The Guardian in 2014.

== Contents ==
3:AM sees itself as an extension of publishing traditions forged by earlier literary magazines before the advent of webzines. It has claimed its litblog 'Buzzwords' to be the world's first (since 2000). The magazine features literary criticism, fiction, poetry, and interviews with writers, philosophers and intellectuals.

In its early period, 3:AM focused particularly on cult and transgressive fiction, for instance Attack! Books, Stewart Home, Tom Bradley and Chris Kelso. Its outlook and coverage was for some years post-punk, particularly the emphasis on Blank Generation authors and elements of Prada-Meinhof (for instance Stuart Christie and John Barker). Both Stuckism and the Medway Poets featured prominently, from Billy Childish, Wolf Howard and Sexton Ming to a column by mainstay Charles Thomson, though to a lesser extent 3:AM also carried pieces supportive of Britart, in particular on Damien Hirst and with Matthew Collings. There was a further strong musical presence on the site, from an extensive archive by and about punk rockers (including several interviews with members of the Bromley Contingent), through to pieces by and about Spacemen 3 and other shoegazer acts.

Authors interviewed several times include Steve Almond, Will Ashon, Stephen Barber, Childish, Andrei Codrescu, Dennis Cooper, Richard Hell, Stewart Home, Tom Bradley, Wu Ming, Michael Moorcock, Dan Rhodes, Nicholas Royle, Iain Sinclair, Scarlett Thomas, Cathi Unsworth, John King, Helen Walsh, Jon Savage, and Simon Critchley. The magazine also interviewed figures in the underground press, such as Lisa Crystal Carver, Lydia Lunch, Mick Farren and Pleasant Gehman. It has carried poetry by Charles Bukowski and featured interviews by Bukowski acolyte Ben Pleasants, including with John Fante and Steve Richmond. Former Kenickie and Brian Jonestown Massacre keyboardist turned novelist Tony O'Neill was a regular contributor and interviewee.

Past columnists have included Sophie Parkin, Ben Myers, Hillary Raphael, and Cathi Unsworth, while past editors have included Noah Cicero, Heidi James, Travis Jeppesen, Tao Lin (Poetry Editor), Adelle Stripe, HP Tinker and Guy Mankowski.

Tom McCarthy (whom it championed from the outset of his writing career) has written several pieces for 3:AM and appeared at a number of its events. 3:AM Editor Andrew Gallix runs the unofficial Tom McCarthy site 'Surplus Matter' It has reviewed, interviewed and run excerpts of avant-garde writers Lydia Lunch, Stephen Barber and Stewart Home.

Later 3:AM became eminent in the translation of European avant-garde poetry under its Maintenant series. Its 3:AM Asia strand has also covered transgressive culture and artists, particularly from Japan. Hiromi Suzuki is one such example. The 'End Times' series of interviews with leading philosophers became a crucial part of 3:AM's identity, which resulted in collected interviews being published by Oxford University Press. Recently, 3:AM has also shown an increased engagement with avant-garde fiction and with essayistic, philosophically-inflected forms of literary criticism. In 2014, 3:AM partnered with the British Film Institute for their Derek Jarman season on the 20th anniversary of his death. In 2016, 3:AM reintroduced its earlier music strand of essayistic journalism and interviews. Since 2023 the site has been hosted on a server using 100 per cent sustainable energy .

== Editors ==
As of April 2020, the co-editor in chief of 3:AM is Andrew Gallix, with Joseph Schrieber (non-fiction editor), Mark de Silva (fiction editor), SJ Fowler (poetry editor), Lee Rourke, Isabella Streffen, and Sylvia Warren (contributing editors).

== See also ==
- List of literary magazines
- List of avant-garde magazines
