= Jessica Andrews (writer) =

English writer

- Born: Jessica Charlotte Andrews; 1992 (age 33–34); Sunderland, England
- Education: King's College London (BA); University of Kent (MA)
- Years active: 2016–present
- Website: www.jessica-andrews.com

Jessica Charlotte Andrews (born 1992) is an English writer, academic and editor. Her debut novel Saltwater (2019) won the Portico Prize. This was followed by Milk Teeth (2022). Her writing covers topics such as class, gender, mother–daughter relationships, and body image.

Andrews is an Elle contributing editor and lectures at City, University of London.

== Early life ==
Andrews was born to a working-class family in Sunderland and attended St Robert of Newminster Catholic School. The first in her family to go to university, Andrews graduated with a bachelor's degree in English literature and language from King's College London in 2013 and a master's degree in creative writing from the University of Kent in 2015, including a term studying in Paris.

== Career ==
In 2017 when Andrews was 25, Sceptre (a Hodder & Stoughton imprint) won a four-way auction to publish her debut novel Saltwater in spring 2019. The novel is heavily based on Andrews' own experiences as a working-class northern woman who moved to London for university and then into her late grandfather's home in Donegal, Ireland. She wrote the novel while living there. Andrews chose to write it as fiction rather than a memoir because she wanted "to distance myself from the story" and felt "there's a lot more freedom in fiction... With fiction, you can take an image or symbol further". Saltwater won the 2020 Portico Prize, given to novels that best evoke "the spirit of the North". Andrews was also shortlisted for the 2022 Good Housekeeping Women's Prize for Fiction Futures Award.

Andrews was an associate lecturer at the University of Roehampton in 2021 before joining City, University of London as a lecturer in creative writing in 2022. That same year, she became a contributing editor of the magazine Elle. Andrews presents a podcast Tender Buttons with Jack Young for Storysmith, a bookshop in Bristol.

For her second novel Milk Teeth, released in 2022, Andrews returned to her first publisher, Sceptre. The novel's themes include class, sex, desire, denial, relationships between women, city life and body image. Milk Teeth was shortlisted for the Royal Society of Literature's 2023 Encore Award.

In 2024, Andrews adapted Rose Glass's 2019 psychological horror film Saint Maud with theatre director Jack McNamara for the Live Theatre Company.

== Bibliography ==
=== Novels ===
- Saltwater (2019)
- Milk Teeth (2022)

=== Short fiction ===
- "The Skin is the Largest Organ" in Somesuch Stories (2017)
- "A Bright Young Thing" in Somesuch Stories #3 (2017)
- "The Fishmonger" in At the Table (2018)
- "Wild Cat" in Soho House Magazine (2019)
- "My Sister was a Dancer" (2019) for BBC Radio 4
- "Rebel Woman of Sunderland" (2020), collaboration with Kathryn Robertson and Sunderland Culture
- "Blood Brothers" in The Book of Newcastle (2020)
- "The End of the Pier" in At the Table Almanac (2020)
- "Horses" in Somesuch Stories #6 (2022)
- "Woman seeks room in London" in Towards Abundance: The Delightful Paradoxes of Gender (2023) by The Architectural Review
- "It Felt Like Home" in Somesuch Stories #7 (2023)

=== Select essays ===
- "White Cardboard Boxes" in Somesuch Stories (2018)
- "Pleasures of... April" in Caught by the Rivers (2019)
- "The shifting shape of language" (2020) for the Wellcome Collection

=== Plays ===
- Saint Maud (2024)

== Accolades ==
Year	Award	Category	Title	Result	Ref
2020	Portico Prize		Saltwater	Won	
2022	Women's Prize x Good Housekeeping	Futures Award		Shortlisted	
2023	Royal Society of Literature	Encore Award	Milk Teeth	Shortlisted	
