= Richard: A Novel =

2010 novel by Benjamin Myers

First edition

Richard: A Novel is a book by English author and journalist Ben Myers about musician Richey Edwards. Edwards, who suffered from depression, alcoholism, anorexia and self-harm, disappeared on 1 February 1995 at the age of 27 and was declared officially presumed dead on 23 November 2008. Richard was published by Picador and was released on 1 October 2010.

On his blog on 28 May 2010, Myers noted that Picador ran a Twitter-based competition to win an advance bound proof copy of Richard, and that an advance bound proof copy of the novel had been put up for auction on eBay.

== Plot ==
Richard comprises two narratives. One is from Richey's first-person point of view, beginning with his departure from his London Hotel on 1 February 1995, and covering his thoughts, movements and encounters from this point onwards. The second narrative strand is a second-person point of view, running through Richey's childhood, school, university, career with the Manic Street Preachers, and physical/emotional breakdown. This second narrative strand eventually reaches the point at which the first narrative strand began, converging both narratives.

== Background ==
In an interview in May 2010, Myers said, "I wrote this book for people who have never heard of Richey Edwards, and I thought his story was one that had not been told in a manner befitting his life ... I wanted to get beyond that false perception and tell the story of an intelligent young academic from a good home with good friends around him who became the most engaging British rock star of his era. To do that I felt that fiction was the best medium. I don’t purport Richard to be the absolute truth, but rather a version of it." Myers also said that although he never met Edwards, he "shared many mutual friends or acquaintances with him ... I hope the book is sensitively handled. I also spent months researching it too, so factually it's pretty tight, I think." According to Myers, the book's first draft took six months to write, and went through another six to nine months of edits between himself and his editor at Picador. Myers also said that "many months before the book was even published, Brad Pitt's production company in Los Angeles got in touch to request a copy with a view to adapting it into a film. That wasn't a moment of joy though – more one of mirth. Imagine a Hollywood version of a very Welsh story... well, it's unthinkable, isn't it?"

== Response from the Manic Street Preachers ==
Manic Street Preachers bassist/lyricist Nicky Wire reportedly expressed cynicism towards Myers' book. In an interview in September 2010, Wire said, "I found it too upsetting to read. Richey was – is – a brother, a son, a friend." In another interview in the same month, Wire said, "I just feel it's better if I don't see [the novel]. It's a free country and it's not going to ruin our lives and in a pure fictional sense it may well have its worth. It's just the presumption that the writer kind of knew someone..." In a November 2010 interview, Wire described the premise of the book as “really presumptuous...It would be really pious and stupid to try and ban it because we grew up on rock 'n' roll mythology. I feel uncomfortable with it and it fills me with a bit of dread, but if I was 16 I'd probably look at reading it. But we're not happy with it.”

In an interview with the BBC in September 2010, Ben Myers said that he never expected the Manics to like the book, adding that "All I could have hoped for is that they could accept or appreciate what it is I'm trying to do. I have to accept anything the Manic Street Preachers say about it, but I think the comments that I've heard have been fair enough. Given some of the things Nicky Wire has said in the past about some people I think he's probably been quite charitable. It could have been far, far worse." Myers also said that he had written to the Edwards family, explaining why he wrote the book and "a little bit about myself and about the influence their son had on me and people like me," and sent a similar letter to the Manics.

== Critical response ==
Upon its release, Richard has received mixed reviews.

The Times review claims that "Myers is finest when relating the mechanics of life in and around a rock band; never once is there a dropped beat. He understands the reactionary nature of the post-punk diktat, the people it attracts and its importance to lives given up to it." The review also describes Richard as an "excellent book," and in its "most arresting of sections, Myers draws on all his journalistic skill and fan-boy credentials to give a realistic account of Edward's final days...Myers deserves credit not only for adding a third dimension to Edwards, but for trying a fourth, for attempting to document a period of his life that seems destined to remain a mystery, but could explain much about his complex character...Maybe, thanks to this book, [Edwards] is at last getting something he deserves – an insight into his personal conflicts, his efforts to maintain wellbeing and his desire to do the right thing."

Also in The Times, Bob Stanley of St. Etienne selected Richard as one of the best music books of 2010.

Mojo describes Richard as "a work of fiction that bears a convincing ring of truth...This nuanced portrait of Edwards, explores the band's rise, the Richey myth, and the pain that fuelled his alienation anorexia and self-harm," and the New Humanist describes Ben Myers as "a sensitive, thoughtful writer...His greatest skill is the atmospheric evocation of landscape and place."

According to Marie Claire magazine, “Myers' recreation of Edward's life is sensitively handled – an exploration of a troubled, articulate man who was shy and withdrawn.”

Time Out writes that “Richard is not a provocation, nor does it claim to solve the Richey mystery. It is a sympathetic and sad imagining of the boy who became a reluctant pop idol before that notion became oxymoronic.” bookmunch.com has described Richard as "a novel for our celebrity-obsessed age, a thorough investigation – written in beautiful prose – of a young man suicided or disappeared by society. From life in a small town to sex, drugs and rock and roll excess, Ben Myers' Richard slashes and burns its way through the bloated beigeness of the contemporary British novel." The review by 3:am review claims that "What is sure is Myers' skill for storytelling; the absence of any cynicism, a certain hypnotic meditative pace he successfully employs that draws you in as the novel progresses and a mood of melancholic nostalgia, a tantalising nostalgia for a time not long passed but gone forever, before social networking and mobile phones, when NME was samizdat and music, art, culture were things you risked getting your head kicked in for. And a nostalgia for places and people, of course, who are no longer here."

Marilyn Roxie, for the website A Future in Noise, describes Richard as “a novel that, while imperfect, largely works as both a tribute to an iconic figure and an analysis of a talented, intelligent individual with real problems.”

Reviewing the novel for The Independent, Jonathan Gibbs writes that “there's no escaping the fact that the writing is, considering its subject, bizarrely insipid...You can't imagine Richey giving [this book] the time of day.”

The review in The Metro claims that “for all the objective merits of Myers’ writing, it's hard not to find Richard: A Novel rather repulsive. Fictional stories about real people are not new but taking so much artistic licence with a man only legally presumed dead in 2008 is distasteful.”

Terry Staunton of Record Collector writes that "There's an element of macabre tabloid sleaze to [Myers'] conjecture, and some awkward amateur psychoanalysis attempting to identify the demons that led to Richey going AWOL. Equally contentious are the flashback sequences, differentiated here by itallics, charting Edwards’ rise and fall, which clearly take liberties with the subject's innermost thoughts...Nicky Wire has already expressed the band's unhappiness with the book, and several thousand diehard Manics fans may soon be joining the chorus of disapproval."

Reviewing Richard, Paul Owen of The Guardian writes that “It seems a cheap criticism to say that a former music journalist falls back too frequently on the style of the indie press, but unfortunately that is the case here...Banality and lack of imagination mar the text...Myers deploys frequent paragraph breaks and short, solemn sentences in an attempt to imbue the text with gravitas, a device overused to the point of self-parody. The book is also poorly edited, adding to an overall impression of sloppiness.” Owen goes on to say that “Myers tries to interpret Edwards's depression, eating disorders and self-harm, key components of his cult status and crucial precursors of his decision to disappear. The trouble is that the real Richey wrote about these things far more memorably and distinctively himself, most notably on his final album with the Manics, The Holy Bible...Set against this existing body of work, the task Myers has set himself seems somewhat pointless...it is hard to escape the feeling that this is less a novel than a music biography written in the first and second person.”

When issued as a mass market paperback in October 2011 Richard received a much more positive review in The Guardian.

An academic analysis of the overall critical response to Myers’ book by the Brighton University academic Paula Hearsum concluded; ‘the fans’ general rejection of Myers’ knowingly faked Edwards’ autobiography was more than a blind response to its author treading on the hallowed ground of Edward’s celebrity image or misrepresenting his fan base. Instead it reflected judgments about the author’s critical distance from the fan role he claimed to inhabit…Ultimately, Myers’ work was dismissed by fans and critics not because he had dramatically impersonated Edwards, but because his prose did not seem faithful enough to the original its inspiration.
