= Joe Stretch =

English writer and singer

Joe Stretch (born 7 January 1982) is an English writer and singer.

His first novel, Friction, was published by Vintage Books at Random House in 2008. His second novel, Wildlife, was published in 2009. His visceral, savage writing style has led to comparisons with French novelist Michel Houellebecq. His third book, The Adult, was released in August 2012. It won the Somerset Maugham Award and was shortlisted for the Portico Prize.

In his review of Wildlife in The Independent, Lee Rourke describes the book as "a serious meditation on technology and individualism."

In 2010 Stretch wrote the first ever interactive audio novel to appear on Spotify. It was read by the actress Anna Friel and marked the release of the debut album by the band Hurts.

Stretch grew up in Burton-in-Kendal. He studied politics at Manchester University and sings in the band (we are) Performance. The other members of the band are Laura Marsden on guitar, Joe Cross on drums. Hilary Marsden (Laura's sister) was also a member of the band prior to the release of their self-titled debut album in 2007. The group met whilst they were at university in Manchester.

He has lectured in Creative Writing at Keele University, and Manchester Metropolitan University.
