= Ben Myers =

British writer and journalist

Ben Myers FRSL
- Born: January 1976 (age 50); Durham, County Durham, England
- Education: University of Bedfordshire
- Occupations: Writer and journalist
- Spouse: Adelle Stripe
- Writing career
- Notable awards: Portico Prize For Literature. Gordon Burn Prize. Roger Deakin Award. Walter Scott Prize for Historical Fiction. Goldsmiths Prize.
- Website: www.benjaminmyerswriter.com

Benjamin Myers FRSL (born January 1976) is an English writer, novelist, and journalist.

== Early life ==
Myers grew up in Belmont, County Durham, and was a pupil at the estate's local comprehensive school where he became interested in reading and skateboarding.

Myers attended his first concert in Durham in March 1990, when he was fourteen. It led to him forming the punk rock band Sour Face the next year. The band quickly became involved in the Durham hardcore punk scene. Despite being one of the few bands in the scene that was not straight edge, Sour Face became the mascots, with their third performance seeing them open for NOFX. Voorhees' first performance was opening for Sour Face in September 1991.

As a teenager Myers began writing for British weekly Melody Maker. In 1997 he became their staff writer while residing in the Oval Mansions squat for several years. In 2011 he published an article, about his brief time as an intern at News of the World. He has spoken about failing English Literature at A-level and being rejected by "more than a hundred" universities before being accepted by the University of Bedfordshire (formerly Luton University).

== Work ==
=== Journalism ===
As a journalist, Myers has written about literature, music and the arts for a number of publications including New Statesman, Mojo, The Guardian, NME, The Spectator, BBC, New Scientist, Alternative Press, Kerrang!, Plan B, Arena, Bizarre, The Quietus, Vice, Shortlist, Caught by the River, Metal Hammer, The Morning Star, Classic Rock, 3:AM Magazine, Mineshaft and Time Out.

=== Books ===
Myers' books span literary fiction, nature/landscape writing, crime, historical fiction and poetry. He has been translated into eight languages. He has published several poetry collections and written a number of music biographies which have been widely translated. He is a founding member of the Brutalists, a literary collective including authors Adelle Stripe and Tony O'Neill. His second novel, Richard: A Novel, was a fictionalized account of the life of musician Richey Edwards. It was published by Picador in October 2010, and polarised critical opinion.

Pig Iron (2012) was set in the traveller/gypsy community of the northeast of England and was the first to be published under his full name Benjamin Myers. Published by Bluemoose Books, it won the inaugural Gordon Burn Prize and was longlisted for 3:AM Magazine's 'Novels of the Year' and runner-up in The Guardian's 'Not The Booker Prize', in the same year.

Myers' novel The Gallows Pole (2017), based on the true story of the Cragg Vale Coiners, received a Roger Deakin Award and won the 2018 Walter Scott Prize for historical fiction. As part of the prize, both author and book title appeared as the official Royal Mail franking stamp for a week on an estimated 60 million pieces of mail. It was released by Third Man Books, part of Third Man Records in the US and Canada. In 2021 the BBC announced an adaptation of the novel by director Shane Meadows. It was first broadcast on BBC2 on 31 May 2023.

His novel The Offing (2019) featured on Radio 4's Book At Bedtime, was a Radio 2 Book Club choice and was chosen as a book of the year in The Times. The audiobook was narrated by actor Ralph Ineson. A stage version of The Offing was produced in Scarborough and Newcastle in 2021, and it was announced in 2023 that a film would be produced of the novel starring Helena Bonham Carter and directed by Jessica Hobbs.

In late 2018 it was reported he had signed to Bloomsbury Publishing. The deal was satirised in the 'Books & Bookmen' column in Private Eye.

Cuddy, his eighth novel, combines poetry, prose, play, diary and real historical accounts of the story and legacy of St. Cuthbert and his connection to Durham Cathedral.

Rare Singles, his ninth novel, is set across a Northern Soul weekender in Scarborough and is currently in development as a film.

== Personal life ==
Myers lives in the Calder Valley with his wife, the author Adelle Stripe.

== Honours ==
In 2014 Myers won the Society of Authors Tom-Gallon Trust Award for his short story, 'The Folk Song Singer'. He was runner-up in the same prize in 2018 for his story 'A Thousand Acres Of English Soil'. His poem 'The Path To Pendle Hill' was selected by New Statesman as one of its Poems Of The Year 2015 and work from the same collection were read by Myers on BBC1 programme Countryfile.

His novel Beastings (2014) won the Portico Prize For Literature and the Northern Writers' Award. It was also longlisted for the Jerwood Fiction Uncovered Prize. In 2019 he was awarded an Honorary Doctor of Letters from York St John University.

Myers was named a Fellow of the Royal Society of Literature in 2023. He was awarded the 2023 Goldsmiths Prize for his novel, Cuddy, which was described by the judges as "a book of remarkable range, virtuosity and creative daring."

== Awards ==
- 2013 Northern Writers' Award winner for Beastings
- 2013 Gordon Burn Prize winner for Pig Iron
- 2014 Tom-Gallon Trust Award winner for The Folk Song Singer
- 2015 Jerwood Fiction Uncovered Prize longlist for Beastings
- 2015 The Portico Prize For Literature winner for Beastings
- 2016 Roger Deakin Award winner for The Gallows Pole
- 2017 Republic of Consciousness Prize longlist for The Gallows Pole
- 2018 Tom-Gallon Trust Award (runner-up) for A Thousands Acres Of English Soil
- 2018 Walter Scott Prize winner for The Gallows Pole
- 2019 Prix Polars Pourpres Découverte for Turning Blue (published in France as Dégradation)
- 2020 The Portico Prize for Literature shortlisted for Under The Rock
- 2020 Lieblingsbuch der Unabhängigen (Independent Booksellers' Award in Germany) winner for The Offing
- 2023 Goldsmiths Prize winner for Cuddy
- 2024 Winston Graham Historical Prize winner for Cuddy
- 2024 RSL Ondaatje Prize shortlisted for Cuddy

== Bibliography ==
=== Fiction ===
==== Novels ====
- The Book of Fuck (Wrecking Ball Press, 2004)
- Richard: A Novel (Picador, 2010)
- Pig Iron (Bluemoose, 2012. Bloomsbury, 2019)
- Beastings (Bluemoose, 2014. Bloomsbury, 2019)
- The Gallows Pole (Bluemoose, 2017. Bloomsbury, 2019)
- The Offing (Bloomsbury, 2019)
- The Perfect Golden Circle (Bloomsbury, 2022)
- Cuddy (Bloomsbury, 2023)
- Rare Singles (Bloomsbury, 2024)
- Jesus Christ Kinski (Bloomsbury, 2025)
- Whiteadder/Wolfspider (Bloomsbury, 2027)

==== Short stories ====
- Male Tears (Bloomsbury, 2021)

==== Crime fiction ====
- Turning Blue (Moth/Mayfly, 2016. Bloomsbury, 2022)
- These Darkening Days (Moth/Mayfly, 2017. Bloomsbury, 2022)

==== Short fiction ====
- The Whip Hand (Tangerine Press, 2018). Short story (Signed/limited edition hand-sewn chapbook)
- Snorri & Frosti (Galley Beggar Press / 3:AM Press, 2013). Novella (limited edition paperback and Ebook)

=== Non-fiction ===
- American Heretics: Rebel Voices In Music (Codex, 2002)
- Under The Rock (Elliott & Thompson, 2018)

=== Poetry ===
- I, Axl: An American Dream (online only, 2008–2009)
- Spam: Email Inspired Poems (Blackheath, 2008)
- Nowhere Fast (co-written with Tony O'Neill and Adelle Stripe (Captains Of Industry, 2008)
- The Raven of Jórvíkshire (Tangerine Press, 2017)
- Heathcliff Adrift (New Writing North, 2014. Reissued 2018)
- The Offing: Poems by Romy Landau (Bloomsbury/Tangerine Press, 2019)

=== Music biography / essays ===
- John Lydon : The Sex Pistols, Pil and Anti-Celebrity (IMP 2005)
- Green Day : American Idiots and the New Punk Explosion (IMP / Disinformation, 2005)
- System of a Down : Right Here in Hollywood (IMP / Disinformation, 2006)
- Muse : Inside the Muscle Museum (IMP 2004 and 2007)
- The Clash : Rock Retrospectives (2007, with Ray Lowry)
