= Adelle Stripe =

English writer and journalist

- Born: 1976 (age 49–50); York, North Yorkshire, England
- Education: University of Greenwich University of Manchester
- Occupation: Writer
- Website: www.adellestripe.co.uk

Adelle Stripe (born 1976) is an English writer and journalist.

== Work ==
Stripe's writing is rooted in the non-fiction novel form and explores working-class culture, untold histories of Northern England, popular music, and small-town life.

Black Teeth and a Brilliant Smile, her debut novel, was a fictionalised biography based on the life and work of Bradford playwright Andrea Dunbar. A theatrical adaptation by Bradford's Freedom Studios and screenwriter Lisa Holdsworth toured across Yorkshire to critical acclaim. A new edition of the book was reissued by Virago in 2025 and was described by David Peace as 'one of the great debut novels of the century.'

Ten Thousand Apologies (2022) is her collaborative biography of cult UK band Fat White Family, co-written with singer Lias Saoudi, that traces the group's origins from working-class Huddersfield to Algeria, via sectarian Northern Ireland and the squats of south London.

Her most recent work, Base Notes: The Scents of a Life, is an olfactory memoir of working-class womanhood and complex family ties, told through a prism of 20th century perfumes.

In 2006, alongside Tony O'Neill and Ben Myers she formed possibly the first literary movement spawned via a social networking site, the Brutalists. She published three chapbook collections of poetry with Blackheath Books, including Dark Corners of Land. The Humber Star, her poem based on the experiences of her ancestors in 19th century Hessle Road, was performed at John Grant's North Atlantic Flux, for Hull UK City of Culture 2017.

As a journalist, Stripe has written features on theatre, film, literature and music for The Quietus, Yorkshire Post and New Statesman.

Her spoken word has appeared on recordings by Smagghe & Cross and the Eccentronic Research Council.

== Reception ==
In 2017, writing in The Spectator, Andy Miller noted that Stripe's portrayal of Andrea Dunbar in Black Teeth and a Brilliant Smile ‘mixes fiction and biography in a manner that brings to mind the work of the late Gordon Burn. [...] The author's voice and Dunbar's mingle to create not just a portrait of an artist — funny, mischievous, reckless and truthful — but also divisions of class, geography and opportunity which continue to shape this country.’ The Stage commented that 'Dunbar does not emerge from Stripe's fictionalisation as a victim, but as a clever, unhappy woman who deserved better.'

Wendy Erskine, who reviewed Ten Thousand Apologies in the Irish Times, said that Stripe ‘is a master at giving real-life novelistic momentum and shape without anything seeming forced or schematic, and she brings sharp perspicacity to every scene.’ Writing in the Observer, Miranda Sawyer described the book as a 'bleak, funny and compelling biography.[...] Stripe is known for her imaginative novel/biography of Andrea Dunbar, and this book, too, though it reads pretty close to the truth, emphasises that “fact has been used to create fiction” and that people remember events differently.'

Reviewing Base Notes in The Observer, the critic Chris Power noted that the use of second person, although more common in fiction, is 'an unusual choice for memoir, which typically depends on communication flowing directly from author to reader [...] Stripe is really in dialogue with the girl and the young woman she was – simultaneously her most intimate companion and a stranger.' The Telegraph, who named it a nonfiction book of the year, commented that the memoir 'is a story of family in all its fractures and complexities.' A TLS review compared the author's portrayal of her mother to Joyce Chilvers in Alan Bennett's A Private Function, 'transposed to the 1980s.'

== Honours ==
Stripe was shortlisted for the Portico Prize for Literature and the Gordon Burn Prize for her novel Black Teeth and a Brilliant Smile. Ten Thousand Apologies was shortlisted for the Penderyn Music Book Prize in 2023, recognising it as a standout work in the realm of music writing.

Her PhD thesis on Andrea Dunbar, non-fiction novels and contemporary northern literature was awarded by the University of Huddersfield.

She was an Anthony Burgess Fellow at Manchester University's Centre for New Writing in 2023.

== Personal life ==
Stripe grew up in Tadcaster, North Yorkshire. She attended Tadcaster Grammar School and York College. She lives in Calderdale and is married to the author Ben Myers.

== Influences ==
Hilary Mantel, Patrick Kavanagh and Keith Waterhouse were all cited by the author as influences in an interview for The Bee Magazine.

== Bibliography ==
=== Non-fiction ===
- Base Notes: The Scents of a Life. White Rabbit, 2025.
- Ten Thousand Apologies: Fat White Family and the Miracle of Failure. White Rabbit, 2022.
- Stay Alive Till '75. Ration Books, 2021.

=== Fiction ===
- Black Teeth and a Brilliant Smile. Virago, 2025.
- Black Teeth and a Brilliant Smile. Wrecking Ball Press, 2017. ISBN 9781903110560
- Black Teeth and a Brilliant Smile. Fleet, 2017. ISBN 9780708898956

=== Short stories ===
- A Place Called Bliss, Flashback: Parties For the People By the People, ed. Jamie Holman and Alex Zawadzki, Rough Trade Books, 2021. ISBN 9781914236136
- The Beautiful Game, AMBIT Issue 243, 2021.
- Driftwood, Common People: An Anthology of Working Class Writers, ed. Kit de Waal, Unbound, 2019. ISBN 9781783527458
- Eight Days Left, The Manchester Review, 2018.

=== Drama ===
- Black Teeth and a Brilliant Smile. Adaptation by Lisa Holdsworth. Methuen Drama, 2019. ISBN 9781350135925

=== Poetry ===
- Dark Corners of the Land. Blackheath Books, 2012.

=== Essays and journalism ===
- Old School, Baby. I Am Weekender. British Film Institute, 2023.
- A Cold Day in July, New Postscripts, BBC Canvas, 2023.
- New Faces in Hell, Excavate: The Wonderful and Frightening World of The Fall. Faber & Faber, 2021. ISBN 9780571358335
- Sweating Tears with Fat White Family. Rough Trade Books, 2019. ISBN 9781912722358

=== Edited works, introductions and forewords ===
- Tangled Hair Yosano Akiko. Tangerine Press, 2025.
- Alma Cogan Gordon Burn. Faber & Faber, 2019. ISBN 9780571347285
- Sweet is the Taste of Tears Yosano Akiko. Tangerine Press, 2014.
