= Lee Rourke =

English writer and literary critic

- Born: 1972 (age 53–54)
- Occupations: Novelist, Literary Critic
- Writing career
- Period: 2002–present
- Notable works: Vulgar Things, Varroa Destructor, The Canal, Everyday, A Brief History of Fables: From Aesop to Flash Fiction

Lee Rourke (born 1972) is an English writer and literary critic. His books include the short story collection Everyday, the novels The Canal (winner of The Guardian’s Not the Booker Prize in 2010), Vulgar Things, and Glitch, and the poetry collections Varroa Destructor and Vantablack.

== Career ==
Rourke is a contributing editor at 3:AM Magazine, has a literary column at the New Humanist, and has written regularly for The Guardian, The Times Literary Supplement, Bookforum, The Independent, and the New Statesman.

From 2012 to 2014, he was Writer-in-Residence at Kingston University, where he later lectured in the MFA Programme in creative writing and critical theory. After leaving Kingston University, he taught creative writing at the University of East London and Middlesex University. He currently lives in Leigh-on-Sea, England.

== Work ==
=== Novels ===
- Glitch - an unflinching study of grief.
- Vulgar Things - part mystery, part romance, part odyssey novel.
- The Canal - boredom, technology, violence.

=== Short stories ===
Everyday is a set of short stories based in the heart of London.

=== Poetry ===
Rourke has published two poetry collections: Varroa Destructor, published in 2013 by 3:AM Press, and Vantablack, published in 2020 by Dostoevsky Wannabe.

=== Anthologies ===
Rourke's work has appeared in a number of anthologies, including Best British Short Stories 2011 (ed. Nicholas Royle, Salt Publishing, 2011), Best European Fiction (ed. Aleksandar Hemon, Dalkey Archive Press, 2011) and The Beat Anthology (ed. by Sean McGahey, Blackheath Books, 2010).

=== Non-Fiction ===
- A Brief History of Fables: From Aesop to Flash Fiction is published by Hesperus Press.
- Trying To Fit a Number to a Name: The Essex Estuary Lee Rourke (author), Tim Burrows (author) is published by Influx Press.
