= Tony O'Neill =

English writer (born 1978)

- Born: Anthony Shaun O'Neill; July 13, 1978 (age 48); Blackburn, Lancashire
- Occupations: Author, journalist, poet, screenwriter
- Spouse: Vanessa O'Neill
- Children: 1
- Writing career
- Period: 2005-present
- Genres: Literary fiction, non fiction, poetry, drug-lit
- Notable works: Digging the Vein, Down and Out on Murder Mile, Sick City, Black Neon, Notre Dame du Vide, Songs from the Shooting Gallery, The Savage Life
- Movements: Brutalism, Offbeat Generation, Drug-Lit
- Website: Official website

Tony O'Neill (born in 1978, Blackburn, Lancashire) is an English writer based in New York. A one-time musician with Kenickie (1997–98), Marc Almond (1997–98), The Brian Jonestown Massacre (1999), and Kelli Ali (2001–04), O'Neill has written several books including Digging the Vein (2006), Down and Out on Murder Mile (2008) and Sick City (2010).

== Literary career ==
Digging the Vein was a novel based on O'Neill's years as a heroin and crack addict as well as his experiences in the music industry. The sequel, Down and Out on Murder Mile was released by Harper Perennial as a mass-market paperback in 2008.

Sick City was released by Harper Perennial in 2010. The plot revolves around two heroin addicts who try to sell a sex tape showing Sharon Tate.

A sequel to Sick City, Black Neon, was published by Walde and Graf in German in 2012. It follows the further adventures of Sick City's protagonists Randal and Jeffrey, and their adventures in the world of Santaria, art-house cinema, and their run-ins with two lesbian pharmacy bandits.

He also co-wrote the memoirs of NFL player Jason Peter. The book, Hero of the Underground, was a New York Times bestseller published in July 2008 by St Martins Press. Other non-fiction works include the memoir of the lead singer of The Runaways, Cherie Currie – Neon Angel: A Memoir of The Runaways (2010, It Books / Harper Collins).

A short story anthology, Notre Dame Du Vide, was published in France, June 2009, by 13e note éditions. Down and Out on Murder Mile and Sick City have been translated into French, and Sick City was scheduled to be published in Germany, Switzerland, and Austria in 2011.

He has written short stories for 3:AM Magazine and Laura Hird's fiction showcase, among others. A short story collection, Seizure Wet Dreams, was published by Social Disease in the UK, also in 2006. In 2007 Songs From The Shooting Gallery, his first book of poetry was published by Burning Shore Press of Long Beach, California. His short story "Fragments of Joe" was featured in The Heroin Chronicles ed. Jerry Stahl, on Akashic Books.

He is a founding member of the Brutalists, a literary collective including authors Adelle Stripe and Ben Myers.

== Works ==
=== Fiction ===
- Digging The Vein (2006) ISBN 978-0976657910
- Down and Out on Murder Mile (2008) ISBN 978-0061582868
- Sick City (2010) ISBN 978-0061789748
- Black Neon (2012) ISBN 978-1910422038
- La Vie Sauvage / The Savage Life (2016) ISBN 9781951081355

=== Short fiction ===
- Seizure Wet Dreams (Social Disease, 2006)
- Notre Dame du Vide (13e note éditions, Paris, 2009)
- The Loose Canon Vol. 1 Siren Song (Montreal, 2009), ISSN 1920-3225
- The Heroin Chronicles (Akashic Books, 2012)
- Dirty Hits: Stories 2005-2015 (Vicon Editions, 2015)
- Forged Prescriptions (Far West Press, 2026)

=== Poetry ===
- Songs from the Shooting Gallery (2007)

=== Non-fiction ===
- Hero of the Underground (2008), co-writer with Jason Peter
- Neon Angel: A Memoir of The Runaways (2010), co-writer with Cherie Currie
