= I Never Liked You (comics) =

1994 graphic novel by Chester Brown

- Cover of the New Definitive second edition of I Never Liked You
- Creator: Chester Brown
- Date: 1994
- Publisher: Drawn & Quarterly

Original publication
- Published in: Yummy Fur
- Issues: 26–30
- Date of publication: October 1991 – April 1993

I Never Liked You is a graphic novel by Canadian cartoonist Chester Brown. The story first ran between 1991 and 1993 under the title Fuck, in issues #26–30 of Brown's comic book Yummy Fur; published in book form by Drawn & Quarterly in 1994. It deals with the teenage Brown's introversion and difficulty talking to others, especially members of the opposite sex—including his mother. The story has minimal dialogue and is sparsely narrated. The artwork is amongst the simplest in Brown's body of work—some pages consist only of a single small panel.

Brown established his reputation in the early alternative comics scene of the 1980s with the surreal, taboo-breaking Ed the Happy Clown. He brought that story to an abrupt end in 1989 when, excited by the autobiographical comics of Joe Matt and Julie Doucet, he turned towards personal stories. The uncomplicated artwork of his friend and fellow Toronto cartoonist Seth inspired him to simplify his own. Brown intended I Never Liked You as part of a longer work with what became his previous book, The Playboy (1992), but found the larger story too complex to handle at once. I Never Liked You was the last work of Brown's early autobiographical period.

I Never Liked You was well received, and its influence can be found in the work of cartoonists such as Jeffrey Brown, Ariel Schrag and Anders Nilsen. The book appeared amid the early 1990s trend in autobiographical alternative comics, and Brown was one of a prominent trio of Toronto-based autobiographical cartoonists, with Seth and Joe Matt. Brown originally set the panels against black page backgrounds, which he replaced with white for an annotated "New Definitive Edition" in 2002.

== Background ==
Brown grew up in Châteauguay, a Montreal suburb with a large English-speaking minority; he does not speak French. He described himself as a "nerdy teenager" attracted to comic books from a young age, and sought a career in superhero comics, but was unsuccessful in finding work with Marvel or DC after graduating from high school. He moved to Toronto and discovered underground comix and the small-press community. From 1983 he self-published a minicomic titled Yummy Fur.

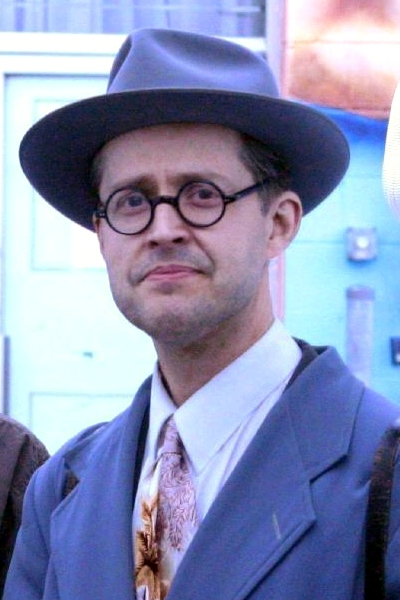
Seth was a fellow Toronto cartoonist whose work inspired Brown to simplify his own.

From 1986 Toronto-based Vortex Comics began publishing Yummy Fur. After making a name for himself in alternative comics with the surreal serial Ed the Happy Clown, Brown turned to autobiography under the influence of the work of Julie Doucet and Joe Matt. During his autobiographical period, Brown gradually simplified his style, inspired by the example of his friend and fellow Toronto cartoonist Seth. He began tentatively with a pair of short tales, and gradually became freer with his panel layouts and simpler in his artwork.

Brown had switched publishers to the Montreal-based Drawn & Quarterly by the time he completed his first autobiographical graphic novel, The Playboy, in 1992. At first, he intended The Playboy and I Never Liked You to form one story, but found it too complex to handle when he started to plan it out. The Playboy deals with Brown's guilt over his teenage obsession with masturbating over pornography. The book gained praise from fans, critics, and other cartoonists, and won a Harvey Award. It received criticism from those who saw it as objectifying women and glorifying pornography; Playboy publisher Hugh Hefner wrote to Brown voicing concern that Brown would feel such guilt in a post-sexual revolution world.

== Synopsis ==
The story is set during Brown's 1970s adolescence in Châteauguay, a suburb of Montreal. Chester—"Chet" for short—is a thin, long-haired teenager who is awkward, introverted, and better able to express himself through drawing than speaking. He constantly and inexplicably turns away girls, even though he is interested in them and they in him. Except in his imagination, Chet has difficulty expressing affection even for his mother. She talks to Chet and his younger brother Gord about issues that embarrass them, and the religious teaching she has instilled in them has rendered Chet unable to bring himself to swear, for which he is teased and goaded at school.

Chet plays games such as hide-and-seek with the neighbourhood children. One girl, Carrie, has a crush on Chet and invites him to her house each day to wash the dishes. He and Carrie's older sister Connie, a bossy blonde a year his senior, often hide during hide-and-seek games in tall grass where they spend the time talking with each other, though they have little in common. Connie asks him to the movies, but he sits away from her when he spots boys from his school; he fears he will be teased for being on a date. When the film ends, they walk home in silence.

The story takes place in Châteauguay, Quebec.

Chet is interested in Sky, a large-breasted dark-haired girl two years younger who lives next door, about whom he has masturbatory fantasies. He confesses his love but immediately regrets it, unable to express his feelings. She connects with Chet and tries to develop a relationship, but he is unable to deal with his emotions and avoids spending time with her. He draws her a picture of a skeleton symbolizing himself reaching for a bird signifying Sky herself. When Carrie deciphers it correctly he denies that he uses symbolism in his drawings, and the confrontation escalates to minor violence when Carrie proclaims to him, "I never liked you!"

Chet and his brother rarely visit their mother after she checks into hospital, and when they do Chet cannot bring himself to tell her he loves her. She falls down a flight of stairs there when confusedly wandering around and dies after being bedridden and incoherent for a short time. Chet makes excuse after excuse to turn Sky away when she tries to spend time with him. The story ends with Chet refusing to accompany Sky to the fair because he says he would rather listen to his new Kiss album.

== Publication ==
I Never Liked You was originally serialized under the title Fuck, in issues #26–30 of Yummy Fur, between October 1991 and April 1993. Unlike his earlier works, according to Brown there was "very little improvisation in I Never Liked You. It was quite planned out, even if I didn't write a full script."

Drawn & Quarterly issued a collected edition in 1994, changing the title from Fuck to I Never Liked You. Brown rearranged the page layouts, removing panels, most significantly those in the prologue where Chet explains his motivations.

A "New Definitive Edition" appeared in 2002, with two added pages of contextual endnotes, something he had been increasingly doing from 1995 with his cartoon essay "My Mom Was a Schizophrenic". In the 1994 collection the backgrounds were black; he changed them to white and rearranged the panels for the "New Definitive Edition". He explained: "I like austerity. The white background looks more austere to me." The edition included a short appendix for readers "wondering when and where things happened".

Brown announced in Louis Riel #7 a recall of the first 600 copies of the edition, citing that the paper it was printed on was too transparent. The recalled copies also had a panel captioned "I decide to say nothing"; the caption did not appear in copies that were not recalled.

== Style and analysis ==
Academic Charles Hatfield finds "an abiding interest in the ways people are shaped by their environment" in Brown's autobiographical work, and believes the stories demonstrate "the urgency of Justin Green and the mundane particularity of Harvey Pekar", two influential creators known for their revealing autobiographical comics. Brown is unsparing in his depictions of social awkwardness of his teenage years. Despite the 1970s adolescent backdrop, sex and drugs are absent; his life is shaped by his strictly religious parents and introversion.

Chet is unable to voice his affection even to his dying schizophrenic mother; his lack of expression defies easy reader identification.

Brown's mother (1923–76) had schizophrenia. This is not made explicit, but hinted at in scenes where she approaches awkward subjects with Chet and his brother Gord; the boys' unsupportive responses feed the discomfort. Brown addresses his mother's mental health in his 1995 cartoon essay "My Mom Was a Schizophrenic", in which he takes an anti-psychiatric stance.

Chet's face is near expressionless throughout. The characters are distanced from the reader, inviting neither empathy nor identification. To cartoonist and critic Pepo Pérez, this is a challenge to readers to understand the characters. In the appendix to the "New Definitive Edition", Brown declares the dialogue is filtered through his memory and likely did not occur as recorded, and that locations and other details are also subject to lapses of memory. To academic Elisabeth El Refaie this transparency on Brown's part is "a deeper and more sincere form of authenticity". Reviewer C. Max Magee found the tone of awkwardness and emotional emptiness comparable to works by contemporaries such as Daniel Clowes and Chris Ware.

The story unfolds in vignettes, with little setup or context given to any scene. To Hatfield, they "[pop] out of nowhere as a dreamlike series of pulses ... The effect is sometimes eerie ... despite the grounding of the story in mundane everyday stuff." Unlike in his previous graphic novel, The Playboy, Brown makes limited use of a narrator in I Never Liked You. The story is told almost entirely through its pictures and sparse dialogue. The page layouts are also sparse, sometimes limited to a single, small panel on a page, sometimes up to seven or eight. The layout and repetition of panels affects pacing, slowing or quickening scene.

Brown abandoned the grid layout he had used in earlier works for more varied, organic layouts. Backgrounds establish the mood of a scene, harmonizing or contrasting with the action—as when Chet and Connie return from the movies amongst a romantic snow-covered, starry landscape, against an awkward silence accentuated by panel that grow, making the figures appear ever more insignificant.

The cartooning is far looser than in Brown's earlier work, and concerned more with gesture and expression than literal detail. They are rendered with a brush, and amongst the simplest and sparsest in his body of work. There is nonetheless a significant amount of hatching, and the backgrounds are naturalistic, in contrast to the thin, distorted figures. Brown had been paring his artwork since the Playboy stories, as he was not happy with his style and sought "to rebuild [his] style in a way that [he] would like". He continued this with I Never Liked You, where he has said he was "trying to get even more pared down than The Playboy". Certain inanimate objects receive a focus imbuing them with special significance, such as Chet's habitual after-school package of soda crackers or the Brown family home—a house that, to reviewer Darcy Sullivan, "is as much a character [in I Never Liked You] as in The Playboy".

Brown drew the pictures before laying down the panel borders, which conform to the shapes of the pictures they enclosed and are drawn in a wobbly free-hand much like in the artwork of the Los Bros Hernandez or Robert Crumb. He drew each panel individually, assembling them into pages afterwards. In the original serialization and first collected edition, they were placed on black backgrounds. He changed to white backgrounds for the 2002 edition.

== Reception and legacy ==
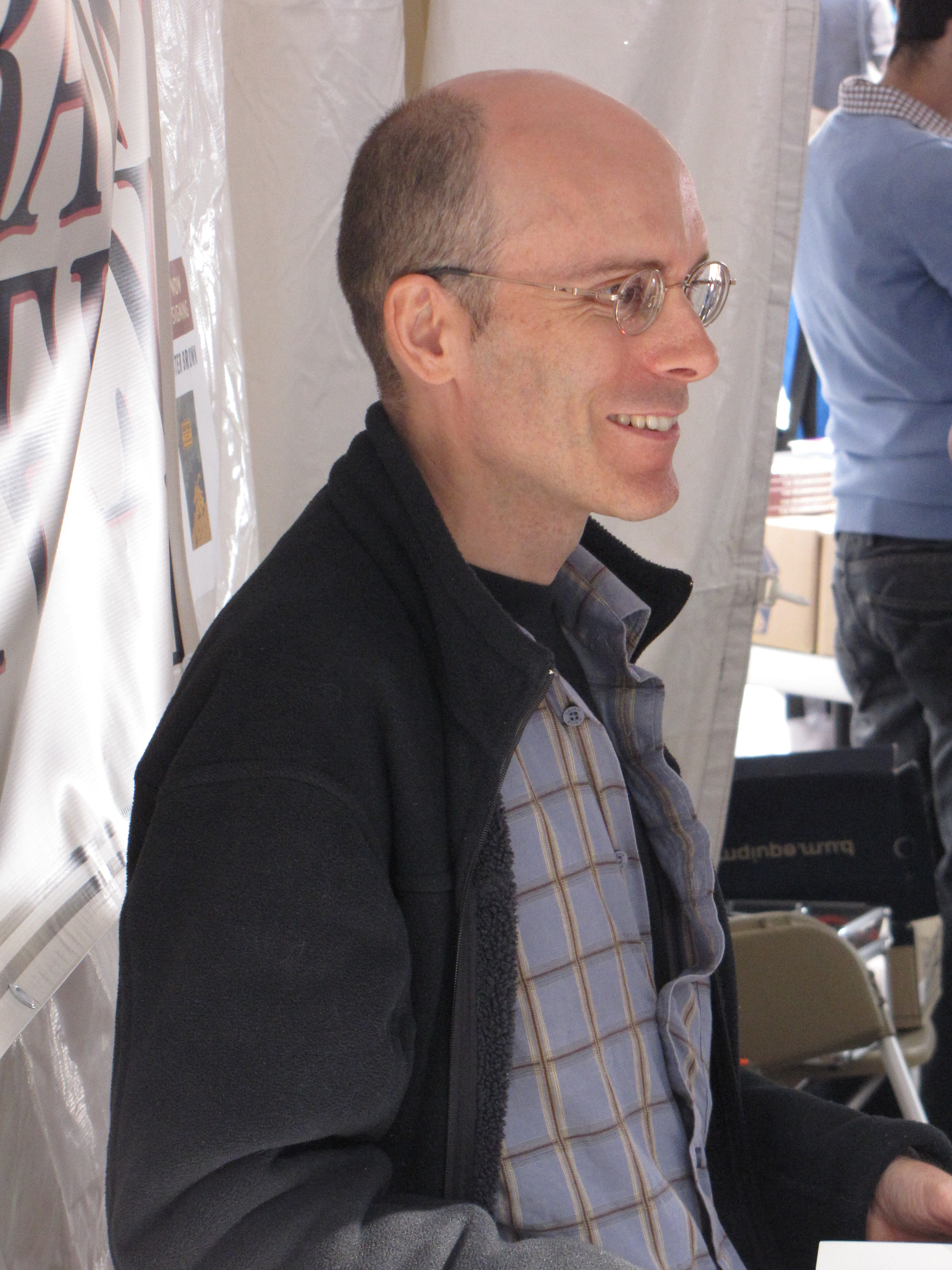
Brown (pictured in 2009) returned to the subject of his relations with women in 2011 in the polemic Paying for It, arguing for the decriminalization of prostitution.

Brown's autobiographical work developed from a scene that had been developing since the 1970s and which had reached a peak in the late 1980s and early 1990s. Brown's open and self-deprecating example left an impact on cartoonists such as Jeffrey Brown and Ariel Schrag, and his sparse layouts on the likes of Anders Nilsen. Upon the serial's conclusion, reviewer Darcy Sullivan called it "a major step forward for the artist, a leading light in adult comics". American cartoonist Gilbert Hernandez hailed The Playboy and I Never Liked You as "probably the best graphic novels next to Maus"; British cartoonist Eddie Campbell called them "the most sensitive comics ever made"; and American comics writer Heidi MacDonald called I Never Liked You "a masterpiece" that is "the equal of any 'coming of age' movie".

Charles Hatfield praised Brown's honesty, keen observation, and narrative strength, and called the "hide with me" page as one of his favourites. Critic Óscar Palmer described the work as "an example of sobriety and restraint, and one of the harshest, most hopeless teenage portraits ... in any medium". Scripter and critic Trajano Bermúdez wrote the book demonstrates Brown a master of his medium. Norwegian cartoonist Jason calls I Never Liked You a favourite autobiographical work.

Alongside Seth's It's a Good Life, If You Don't Weaken and Joe Matt's The Poor Bastard—works by Brown's Toronto-based friends and Drawn & Quarterly stablemates—I Never Liked You is seen as a prominent example of the 1990s autobiographical comics trend. As one of "The Autobiographical Stories from Yummy Fur", it ranked 38th on The Comics Journal's list of the top 100 English-language comics of the 20th century. In 2001 Stephen Weiner included I Never Liked You in his book The 101 Best Graphic Novels, recommending it to those who enjoy J. D. Salinger's novel The Catcher in the Rye.

I Never Liked You was the last work from his autobiographical period that started in 1990 with Helder in Yummy Fur #19. Yummy Fur continued for two more issues before Drawn & Quarterly publisher Chris Oliveros convinced Brown to publish his next serial, Underwater, under its own title in 1994. In 2011 Brown returned to autobiography and his relations with women with the graphic novel Paying for It, a polemic arguing for the decriminalization of prostitution.
