= Chester Brown's autobiographical comics =

1990s comic book stories by Chester Brown

Canadian cartoonist Chester Brown attracted the attention of critics and peers in the early 1990s alternative comics world when he began publishing autobiographical comics in his comic book Yummy Fur. During this period Brown produced a number of short strips and two graphic novels: The Playboy (1992) and I Never Liked You (1994). The personal and revealing deal with Brown's social awkwardness and introversion, and the artwork and page layouts are minimal and organic. In 2011 Brown returned to autobiography with Paying for It, an account of his experience with prostitutes.

The Yummy Fur autobiographical stories have been collected–the short stories in The Little Man (1998), and the graphic novels The Playboy (1992) and Fuck as I Never Liked You (1994, revised 2002). Paying for It (2011) has appeared only in book form.

== Background ==
Several of the stories take place in Châteauguay, Quebec.

Chester Brown grew up in Châteauguay, a Montreal suburb with a large English-speaking minority; he does not speak French. He described himself as a "nerdy teenager" attracted to comic books from a young age, and sought a career in superhero comics, but was unsuccessful in finding work with Marvel or DC after graduating from high school. He moved to Toronto and discovered underground comix and the small-press community. From 1983 he self-published a minicomic titled Yummy Fur.

From 1986 Toronto-based Vortex Comics began publishing Yummy Fur as a full comic book. After making a name for himself in alternative comics with the surreal serial Ed the Happy Clown, Brown turned to autobiography under the influence of the work of Julie Doucet and Joe Matt. He gradually simplified his style, inspired by the example of his friend and fellow Toronto cartoonist Seth.

After bringing Ed to an end, Brown moved on to a series of personally revealing autobiographical stories, starting with "Helder" in Yummy Fur #19. The drawing style, done with a brush, became more and more sparse in an attempt to move away from the style of Ed the Happy Clown, which Brown had grown uncomfortable with. Most of the shorter stories, like "Helder", "Showing Helder" and "Danny's Story", took place not long before they were written, but the longer graphic novels took place mostly in Brown's adolescence in the 1970s.

Brown drew inspiration from Robert Crumb and Harvey Pekar's autobiographical stories, but he says the biggest push he had at the time was from Seth, his friend and fellow Vortex Comics cartoonist; Joe Matt, whose one-page autobiographical cartoons Brown and Seth discovered in 1989, and who eventually moved to Toronto and became friends with the two; and Julie Doucet, whose comics were not explicitly autobiographical, but starred the cartoonist herself and contained autobiographical elements. All four cartoonists would shortly join Drawn & Quarterly and become associated with one another to the public.

Some of Brown's autobiographical early stories dealt with himself as an adult, but he quickly ran into problems with friends who disagreed with his depiction of them. He then turned to his teenage years and produced some of his most highly acclaimed work. He says he found "the intense emotions of the period [of adolescence], as you’re figuring out sex and love and everything" to be "bound to produce rich material for stories."

Brown's autobiographical work developed from a scene that had been developing since the 1970s and which had reached a peak in the late 1980s and early 1990s.

== Stories ==
=== "Helder" ===
The story takes place in a rooming house with shared kitchen and washrooms where Brown lived in Toronto in 1984. Another tenant, Helder, lives there with his fiancée, Anne. Helder gives Brown a cold welcome when he moves in, but soon comes to Brown's room to introduce himself and Anne—and to ask to borrow money. A week later, Anne returns the money and requests that the tenants not lend to Helder any more.

Helder has a reputation for violence, and a few months later gets into a violent argument with Anne, who receives a black eye. Anne moves out and, since the lease was hers, Helder also must move out, but returns regularly to borrow money from one of the tenants.

Brown meets a new tenant, Donna, whom he wants to ask out. He waits too long, and she ends up going out with Helder. Later, Helder gets into yet another violent confrontation, breaking down Donna's door and smashing a window. Donna soon moves out, but Helder continues to frequently stop by to borrow money until someone calls the police, knowing Helder is carrying illegal drugs. Helder is never seen at the rooming house again.

"Helder" originally appeared in Yummy Fur No. 19, and appears in The Little Man on pages 47–67. The first of Brown's autobiographical stories tells of his experiences with Helder, a difficult neighbour who is prone to violence. The reader encounters two Browns in the story: the character who features in the story, and the narrator who relates it, comments on it, and addresses the reader.

The outspoken and aggressive Helder contrasts with Brown, who is too passive to speak up for himself. When his friend Kris speaks up for him, telling Helder that Brown is "the most honest and straightforward person [she] know[s]", Brown the author downplays this with a note to "take this with a grain of salt".

=== "Showing Helder" ===
"Showing Helder" originally appeared in Yummy Fur No. 20 and appears in The Little Manon pages 68–101.

The story of how "Helder" came to be made. Brown's character worries about the artistic decisions he has made, consulting with friends Kris (his ex-girlfriend), Mark Askwith and Seth, but getting conflicting advice. He changed some of the panels of "Helder" (mainly of Brown's character breaking the fourth wall by talking to the readers) on the advice of Askwith and Kris. Two of the original panels were reproduced in the notes to the collection The Little Man.

According to critic Bart Beaty, the story has an "aura of 'truth'", as "the anecdotal nature of the story lends an air of authenticity for readers who might well wonder why someone would bother to fabricate a story that is so slight." However, Brown runs into trouble with his depictions of people. In particular, his friend Kris objects to the way she is depicted and has Brown change her dialogue.

In this story, Brown "uses no panel borders at all – but still maintains the grid’s left to right zig zag reading"–immediately after this issue Brown would abandon the grid entirely. Originally, Brown had penciled in the panels with borders and backgrounds, but when it came time to ink the artwork, he decided to ink only what he considered essential, dropping the borders and much of the background detail, later saying he had "become dissatisfied with [his] drawing style for awhile and wanted it to be freer -- more spontaneous."

In the end, Brown ran into the problem of telling his story using people he knew:

"[M]y 'story' intersects with other people's 'stories' and sometimes those people are going to think I'm not telling their story right. If those people are friends, I've got a problem."

— Chester Brown, 1998

Brown based his next story on his adolescence, as, aside from relatives, he had lost touch with those he had known as a teenager.

=== The Playboy ===
Set in Châteauguay in the 1970s, The Playboy tells of the adolescent Brown's overwhelming guilt over his obsessive masturbation over Playboy models, narrated by a goading angel-demon lookalike of himself. His obsession so overcomes him that, even when his mother passes away while he is at camp, his first thought at returning home is to retrieve the Playboy he has hidden in the woods. His obsession interferes with his relations with women as an adult: he can maintain an erection for one girlfriend only by fantasizing about his favourite Playmates, and discovers he prefers masturbation to having sex with her.

The story was serialized under the title Disgust in issues #21–23 of Yummy Fur, at the time published by Vortex Comics. Brown stated that he intended a longer story encompassing what ended up in The Playboy and I Never Liked You, but found it too complex to handle when he started to plan it out.

=== "The Little Man" ===
(originally appeared in Yummy Fur #24; appears in The Little Man, pages 102–120)

Inspired by Peter Bagge's "Dickie Bird" strip from Weirdo #10, "which was a perfect simulation of the type of juvenile drawings so many of us did while trapped in dull classrooms."

A "true story"—a retelling of a story that Brown would tell to a friend when he was in elementary school. Brown's character is caught playing with his penis by his teacher, who grabs him by the penis and tries to cut it off with scissors, stretching it in the process. The story progressively gets bigger and more ridiculous, with the police chasing after Brown, who escapes by spinning his stretched penis like a helicopter's blades, while urinating on the police at the same time. Brown then shoots his principal and drives away in a police car. Towards the end, the scene cuts to Brown continuing to build up his story to his friend, Russell. He's cut off by his mother, however, as he gets home, who asks Russel to leave, telling Brown, "I just...don't want anyone here right now." The story closes with a page of the young Brown urinating in the toilet at home.

=== "Danny's Story" ===
(originally appeared in Yummy Fur #25; appears in The Little Man, pages 128–141)

A short story of Brown waking up, urinating, picking his nose, getting dressed and being confronted at his room door by a talkative, black neighbour, "Danny". In the end, Brown tries to close the door, but "Danny" forces his hand inside, which Brown then bites. Danny yells at Brown, "White man never have respect for black man!" and eventually leaves, as Brown ponders breakfast.

The real "Danny" had asked Brown to include him in a Yummy Fur story. Brown did, but never showed it to him. Brown says he was seen flipping through a copy of Yummy Fur #25, but believes "Danny" didn't recognize himself in the story.

=== I Never Liked You ===
Once again telling a tale of Brown's adolescence. Brown has trouble relating with the opposite sex, even when they are the ones trying to connect with him.

The cartooning is far looser than in Brown's earlier work, and concerned more with gesture and expression than literal detail. Brown drew the pictures before laying down the panel borders, which conform to the shapes of the pictures they enclosed and are drawn in a wobbly free-hand.

Brown serialized the story under the title Fuck in issues #26–30 of Yummy Fur between October 1991 and April 1993. Drawn & Quarterly issued a collected edition as I Never Liked You in 1994, in which Brown significantly rearranged the page layouts. A "New Definitive Edition" appeared in 2002 with two pages of endnotes and the black pages backgrounds changed to white, reflecting Brown's turn to an austere aesthetic.

I Never Liked You was the last work from Brown's autobiographical period of the 1990s. Yummy Fur continued for two more issues before Drawn & Quarterly publisher Chris Oliveros convinced Brown to publish his next serial, Underwater, under its own title in 1994.

=== Paying for It ===
(original graphic novel)

In 2011 Brown returned to autobiography and his relations with women with the graphic novel Paying for It, a polemic arguing for the decriminalization of prostitution.

After breaking up with his girlfriend, Sook-Yin Lee, Brown gives up on "possessive monogamy" and makes the case for taking up the life of a "john", detailing each of the 23 prostitutes he has visited to date and his debates with friends over the issue. Includes a 50-page, 23-part appendix elaborating the case for decriminalization of prostitution.

== Style ==
"Beginning with the Playboy series, I really tried to pare down my style. I was feeling trapped by my style. I wasn't totally happy with it. I wanted to try to rebuild my style in a way that I would like. And that process went even further with I Never Liked You, where I was trying to get even more pared down than The Playboy."

— Chester Brown, 1997

During his early 1990s period Brown did away with rigid grid layouts and experimented with organic panel shapes and layouts. He would later move back to a grid system, using a six-panel grid in Louis Riel and an eight-panel grid in Paying for It.

The drawing style became much simpler than it had been in Ed the Happy Clown. Brown disliked his drawing style, and so made an attempt to rebuild his style into something he would like better. He says he was looking at "cartoonists who drew in a simpler way" at the time, such as in the Little Lulu Library reprints from Another Rainbow Publishing that had recently started being published, and his friend and fellow Toronto cartoonist, Seth, who drew in a simpler, New Yorker-inspired way.

Brown had great admiration for Robert Crumb's and Harvey Pekar's autobiographical work, but initially was afraid of being accused of "being a Pekar ripoff". Ultimately he was inspired to try his hand at it by Joe Matt's and Julie Doucet's recent forays in autobio.

== Original appearances ==
Original appearances in Yummy Fur
#	Date	Story	Publisher
19	January 1990	"Helder"	Vortex Comics
20	April 1990	"Showing Helder"	Vortex Comics
21	June 1990	Disgust/ The Playboy Stories (The Playboy)	Vortex Comics
22	September 1990	Disgust/ The Playboy Stories (The Playboy)	Vortex Comics
23	December 1990	Disgust/ The Playboy Stories (The Playboy)	Vortex Comics
24	April 1991	"Danny's Story"	Vortex Comics
25	July 1991	"The Little Man"	Drawn & Quarterly
26	October 1991	Fuck (I Never Liked You)	Drawn & Quarterly
27	January 1992	Fuck (I Never Liked You)	Drawn & Quarterly
28	May 1992	Fuck (I Never Liked You)	Drawn & Quarterly
29	August 1992	Fuck (I Never Liked You)	Drawn & Quarterly
30	April 1993	Fuck (I Never Liked You)	Drawn & Quarterly

Paying for It appeared only in book form, but the rest of Brown's autobiographical stories appeared in issues of Brown's ongoing comic book, Yummy Fur, between January 1990 and April 1993.

Most of the stories were significantly reformatted when published in book form, particularly the two graphic novels, The Playboy and I Never Liked You. Both books saw the panels arranged more sparsely on the pages, sometimes having only a single, small panel on a page. While no new content was added, the page counts of both books increased significantly as a result.

"Showing Helder" was also significantly rearranged when it was reprinted in the Little Man collection, and some of the panels were completely redrawn.

== Book collections ==
Book collections of Chester Brown's autobiographical comics
Year	Title	Publisher	ISBN	Notes
1992	The Playboy	Drawn & Quarterly	978-0-969-67011-7	reformatted collection of Disgust/the Playboy stories from Yummy Fur #21–23
1994	I Never Liked You	Drawn & Quarterly	978-0-969-67016-2	reformatted collection of Fuck from Yummy Fur #26–30
1998	The Little Man: Short Strips 1980–1995	Drawn & Quarterly	978-1-896-59713-3	includes "Helder", "Showing Helder", "The Little Man" and "Danny's Story"
2002	I Never Liked You: The New Definitive Edition	Drawn & Quarterly	978-1-896-59714-0	black page backgrounds changed to white, panels slightly rearranged
2011	Paying for It	Drawn & Quarterly	978-1-770-46048-5	never serialized; introduction by Robert Crumb

== Reception ==
Brown's autobiographical comics are among Brown's most highly thought-of works, and ranked 38th on The Comics Journal's list of the 100 best comics of the century in 1999. American cartoonist Gilbert Hernandez hailed The Playboy and I Never Liked You as "probably the best graphic novels next to Maus"; British cartoonist Eddie Campbell called them "the most sensitive comics ever made"; and American comics writer Heidi MacDonald called I Never Liked You "a masterpiece" that is "the equal of any 'coming of age' movie". Alongside Seth's It's a Good Life, If You Don't Weaken and Joe Matt's The Poor Bastard—works by Brown's Toronto-based friends and Drawn & Quarterly stablemates—Brown's work is seen as a prominent example of the 1990s autobiographical comics trend.

== See also ==
- Confessional writing
