= Paying for It =

Comics by Chester Brown

- Cover to the first edition
- Creator: Chester Brown
- Date: 2011
- Page count: 292 pages
- Publisher: Drawn & Quarterly
- ISBN: 978-1-77046-048-5

Chronology
- Preceded by: Louis Riel

Paying for It, "a comic strip memoir about being a john", is a 2011 graphic novel by Canadian cartoonist Chester Brown. A combination of memoir and polemic, the book explores Brown's decision to give up on romantic love and to take up the life of a "john" by frequenting sex workers. The book, published by Drawn & Quarterly, was controversial, and a bestseller.

The book is concerned with Brown's conflicting desire to have sex, but not wanting to have another girlfriend after his partner Sook-Yin Lee breaks up with him. His solution is to forgo traditional boyfriend/girlfriend relationships and marriage. He takes up frequenting sex workers, and comes to advocate prostitution as superior to the "possessive monogamy" of traditional male–female relations, which he debates with his friends throughout the book.

Brown presents his views in detail in the closing 50-page text section, which includes a 23-part appendix, end notes, and a note from friend and fellow cartoonist Seth. Despite being about the separation of sex from romantic love, Brown calls the book "a type of love story".

== Overview ==
After then-girlfriend Sook-Yin Lee breaks up with him in 1996, Brown, who lacks the social skills to pick up women, spends a celibate three years mulling over what he sees as the negative aspects of romantic love in the modern world. He continues to live with Sook-Yin, even after she brings other men to live with them, and Brown witnesses their lovers' spats. He decides never to pursue a relationship with any one woman again—a condition he calls "possessive monogamy"—but he has "two competing desires -- the desire to have sex, versus the desire to NOT have a girlfriend."

Eventually, he works up the courage to see a sex worker. He rides around on his bicycle looking for streetwalkers, but being unsuccessful, turns to the ads in the backs of free alternative newspapers. After his first experience, he feels free from a "burden" he has carried from adolescence.

Over the course of 33 chapters, Brown depicts his experiences with each of the 23 sex workers he has visited, giving each at least a chapter of her own. He gives details of their physical features and sexual performances, while obscuring their faces and ethnicities and giving them false names. He "becomes an expert" and goes into the details of the trade, learning how to solicit and tip, and what the abbreviations in johns' reviews at the Toronto escort review board mean. At first he uses the pseudonym "Steve McDougal" in his encounters, but, feeling he has nothing to hide, soon reverts to using his real name.

Between his encounters with sex workers are scenes of himself discussing and debating the issue with his friends, especially fellow cartoonists Seth and Joe Matt. Much of the humour in the book comes from the dialogue in these scenes.

Brown wrote Paying for It in response to Victor Malarek's The Johns: Sex for Sale and the Men Who Buy It, Benjamin Perrin's Invisible Chains, and other negative portrayals of men who pay for sex.

In the final chapter, "Back to Monogamy", he ends up with one particular sex worker, "Denise" (albeit in a strictly financial way) for seven years as of the book's publication. Brown ends the book still wondering about the nature of love, and insisting that "paying for sex isn't an empty experience if you're paying the right person for sex", but leaves the question of romantic love essentially open. (Note: "In our culture, we're always having this discussion about what romantic love is. So I guess I leave it open for that reason. I don't think anyone's really sure what we mean by romantic love or love in general. We know it when we feel it." — Brown, in 2011 interview with Mark Medley at the Ottawa Citizen)

=== Notes and appendices ===
The book comes with a 50-page text section, including a bibliography, footnotes and an appendix in 23 parts that argues for a system in which "paying for sex is preferable to romance-based methods". It includes some commentary by his friend and fellow cartoonist Seth, who disagrees with Brown's position and accuses him of having no emotions, but then goes on to say, "The funny thing about Chester is that out of all the men I know he's quite possibly the one I think would make the most considerate boyfriend or husband for a woman...and yet he is the one who picked the whoring."

The appendices underscore the book's "political undercurrent", motivated by people's prejudices against those who buy and sell sex. Brown says he wanted a book that presented the john's side of things, as he does not see himself as an "evil monster", and wants people to understand his perspective.

Brown says he does not expect every reader to read through all of the text portions of the book, and that he himself rarely reads the notes or appendices in the books he reads. He said, "I wanted the material to be there for anyone who wanted a bit of background or to know what I thought about a particular subject in more depth."

== Political background ==
Brown is a libertarian and ran as the Libertarian Party of Canada candidate for the Trinity-Spadina riding in the Canadian federal elections of 2008 and 2011. Brown takes the position throughout the book and its lengthy appendix that prostitution should be decriminalized, and as a libertarian insists the sex trade should not be regulated by the government.

The book was on the verge of completion when Ontario judge Susan Himel struck down several prostitution-related laws in September 2010, which was to be appealed by the government of Canada in June 2011. "I was wishing that the book was out at that point,[...b]ut I hope it becomes influential enough to become part of the debate," Brown said.

The book's release party was on May 1, 2011, the day before the Canadian federal election of that year, in which Brown was running as the Libertarian Party of Canada candidate for the Trinity-Spadina riding. The election was called early after a motion of no confidence on March 25 resulted in the dissolution of Parliament. "Initially, I was a bit annoyed by the timing of the election," Brown said, "but it might turn out to be a good thing that I'm getting publicity at this time." Brown came fifth in his riding with 454 votes, losing to incumbent Olivia Chow.

== Style ==
Brown obscures the faces of all the sex workers in the book

Brown employs a "clinical" style with pages structured in an eight-panel grid which may have been inspired by the comics of Carl Barks, and which "he never veers from" (somewhat like the six-panel pages he used in Louis Riel), "using frail, tiny figures, preventing our involvement with the bodies depicted on the page." The women's faces are obscured by word balloons. Brown says that over the years he has "become less comfortable portraying emotion," and went so far as to scrap 30–40 pages of work around 2007 when he felt he had put too much emotion in the artwork.

While Brown himself has been totally open about his visits with sex workers, all the sex workers in the book are depicted as "faceless brunettes", in order to keep the real women in the story from being identified by friends and family. Brown speculates that a prose treatment may have had an advantage, in that it would not have required such an intrusive device to disguise the women.

Brown says he wanted the minimalist style of the drawings to convey the ordinariness of paying for sex. It is also his first major work to break from the traditional all-caps style of lettering in English-language comic books and strips.

Brown depicts himself showing little or no emotion. In a scene in which he debates sex workers' health care with Seth, his outrage surfaces not in his face, but in a thought balloon in which a thunderstorm rages and takes over the panel. It has been noted that, although Brown depicts himself as dry and emotionless, in real life he has a ready sense of humour.

=== Influences ===
Brown moved his drawing away from the overt Harold Gray influence (as seen in Louis Riel and Underwater) towards a style inspired by the "very stylized, stiff look" of Fletcher Hanks. Close friend Joe Matt also had an influence. Some scenes deliberately echoed scenes in Matt's graphic novel Spent. He set scenes in places that had been depicted in Matt's comics, and did his own take on a restaurant scene that Matt had done. (Note: "[...]there are several scenes in here which are deliberate echoes of things that happened in Spent. Like, I set a scene in the Ten Editions bookstore just because Joe had a scene in it[...]And the scene where we're in the restaurant and the waitress asks if we're artists — Joe had a similar scene in his book, but I show it the way I think it really would have happened because Joe's version was totally inaccurate.[...]There are a couple other things like that, where I'm echoing Joe." — Brown in 2011 interview with Sean Rogers)

Brown cites the "austerity" of the films of Robert Bresson, who "instructed his actors not to show any emotion on their faces", as a major influence.

== Subject matter ==
=== Advocacy ===
While Brown had explored autobiography in the past, he makes clear that advocacy is the prime motivation for the book. He says that, if he had thought a fictional treatment would have served his purposes better, then that would have been the route he would have taken. He had considered that angle, but in the end decided that he wanted to make it clear that he had a personal stake in the issue based on his own experiences as a john.

New York Times critic Dwight Garner compared Brown's pro-prostitution position to that of political philosopher Martha Nussbaum. (Note: "Mr. Brown's fundamental pro-prostitution argument — he considers it a feminist one — is not dissimilar to one put forward by the political philosopher Martha Nussbaum in the wake of the 2008 call-girl scandal that forced Gov. Eliot Spitzer of New York to resign." — Dwight Garner) He also puts forward the idea that feminists should be more consistent when it comes to the right to choose — as with abortion, "it's her body, it's her right".

=== Male–female relations ===
Brown has focused on his problems with relating to women in previous works, most notably in his books The Playboy and I Never Liked You.

Brown began to question traditional male–female relations after he had read Cerebus #186, which contained an essay attacking the modern state of such relations. After Sook-Yin Lee broke up with him, he felt that he no longer wanted to deal with the tensions of being in a boyfriend–girlfriend relationship. After three years of staying celibate, he decided he would start seeing sex workers, although at first he was hesitant, as he did not want to be seen as a "loser".

Brown made his visiting of sex workers known to his friends and relatives (except for his stepmother) shortly after his first visit, and it had been made public long before the appearance of Paying for It, as in his interview with Dave Sim in Cerebus #295–297. That he had been working on a graphic novel on the subject had been known in comics circles at least since 2004 when, in an interview with The Pulse, he says he explores some of René Girard's theories of the origin of desire in his then-yet-unnamed book, and its appearance was much anticipated.

Brown's aversion to relationships with women drew tentative comparisons to friend and fellow cartoonist Dave Sim, known for his controversial views on women. Brown responded to this by saying, "...I don't think women are intellectually inferior to men. But I like being alone." Brown also publicly debated the subject with Sim in the Getting Riel interview, while acknowledging that "Cerebus #186 [the issue in which Sim first laid out his controversial views] did push me in the direction of questioning the whole romantic relationship thing".

=== Depictions of real people ===
Brown had originally intended the book to cover the history of his sex life, including losing his virginity and going through all his girlfriends, but two of his former girlfriends with whom he was still friends (Sook-Yin Lee and the Kris of Helder, Showing Helder and The Playboy) objected to their stories being told in his book. He also intended to include more details of the sex workers he visited, such as their interests and the conversations they had, but was afraid too much detail could identify them — he chose to respect their anonymity; this includes "Denise", the sex worker with whom he ended up having a long-term, monogamous relationship, and who refused to have more of herself included in the book. Brown did not try to contact the other sex workers about their portrayals.

Conversations and debates with Dave Sim were also dropped. As their friendship fell through over Brown's refusal to sign an online petition asserting Sim was not a misogynist, it would have been awkward for him to ask Sim for permission to include those scenes.

==== People depicted ====
Sook-Yin Lee
Brown's third and last girlfriend. After she breaks up with him, he forswears the "possessive monogamy" of traditional male–female relationships.
Seth
Friend and fellow cartoonist, Seth spars with Brown over the issue of prostitution. He also provides the twenty-third appendix to the book.
Joe Matt
Friend and fellow cartoonist, Matt has also been celibate for a long stretch, and takes issue when Brown "cut[s] in line" and has sex before he does. The book is dedicated to him.
Justin Peroff
A musician whom Lee starts seeing when she breaks up with Brown. He moves in with Brown and Lee for a time, but eventually breaks up with Lee and moves out two years later.
Kris Nakamura
Brown's first girlfriend, who has appeared in some of Brown's autobiographical comics in the past. As of the publication of Paying for It, they had remained close friends for close to thirty years.
Gordon Brown
Chester's younger brother, who is happily married and lives in Quebec City at the time the book takes place.

== Reception ==
While it was not surprising that a work by a cartoonist of Brown's standing would receive accolades from his peers and critics (being called "some of the best comics of Brown's career" and "book of the year"), neither was it surprising that the book would be the focus of controversy. The subject matter and Brown's didactic approach to it were expected from the outset to draw fire, but some found Brown's approach to have more aesthetic repercussions:

"Out of consideration for the women, Brown doesn't provide any background detail on the prostitutes he visits, although he does note that he spent a lot of time talking to them and learned much about their lives. He also says he dallied with a variety of ethnic types and hair styles, but — for fear perhaps that they may be recognized by family or friends — their faces are all obscured, and all are portrayed as white-skinned brunettes, (though it's worth noting he does take care to denote individual body types, especially in regards to breast size). That doesn't derail the book too badly but there is a palpable sense of something missing, an experience or emotional hole that needs to be filled. I can well understand and respect Brown's desire to show as much consideration to these women as possible, but not having more female perspective in the book, particularly in a book about such a taboo and divisive subject, hurts the book both aesthetically and in terms of his larger points."

— Chris Mautner

The advocacy displayed in the voluminous pages of the appendix may have been a detriment to the work overall, according to Tom Spurgeon at The Comics Reporter; "Give me scenes like the one where Brown argues with Seth over the issues, seething and impatient with Seth's answers and his own, desperate and human in wanting to make and win such discussions, over any number of facile dissections of each argument's actual merits." Brad MacKay of The Globe and Mail found that them "often amusing" and "thought-provoking," but sometimes "reductive and didactic." Critic R. Fiore found that Brown doesn't argue points well.

Obscuring the faces of the sex workers could be seen as Brown objectifying them, and with a feeling the book lacks a female perspective, "especially since all we see of them is their frequently naked bodies." Brown has also been criticized for treading lightly over darker issues, like human trafficking, an oversight he acknowledges yet largely dismisses in the appendix; (Note: "He considers — and largely if not entirely dismisses — concerns about troubling issues like sex slavery, thieving pimps and abuse." — Dwight Garner in The New York Times) and class, one he barely acknowledges. Matt Seneca objected to paying for the book, as he felt the money would indirectly pay for the exploitation of sex workers. Brown also raised eyebrows by claiming physical drug addiction doesn't exist.

== Other media ==
In May 2012, Sook-Yin Lee told Ottawa Magazine that she would be directing a film adaptation of Paying for It. The script was being prepared by Lee, Brown and Adam Litovitz, with an eye towards making the story less didactic and episodic.

The film adaptation, Paying for It, premiered in the Platform Prize program at the 2024 Toronto International Film Festival. In conjunction with the film premiere, Drawn & Quarterly also reissued a new "film edition" of the graphic novel, with a foreword by Lee and special bonus material about the film production.

== Publication history ==
The book was the first of Brown's books not to be serialized. Brown originally intended Louis Riel to be published this way, but was convinced by Drawn & Quarterly editor-in-chief Chris Oliveros to publish it as a series. Following poor sales of the Louis Riel comic-book serialization, Oliveros relented and gave Brown the go-ahead to publish Paying for It directly in book form. It was supported, as Louis Riel was, by a grant from the Canada Council for the Arts, this time for CAD $16,000 which he received in 2005.

The title was not what Brown would have wanted. He wanted to have a more direct title that used words like "sex", "prostitute" or "trick". Some of the titles he floated around were I Pay for Sex or The Sex Life of John Brown but his publishers asked him to call it Paying for It, a title which rubbed him the wrong way, as "[i]t suggests that not only am I paying for sex but I'm also paying for being a john in some non-monetary way. Many would think that there's an emotional cost — that johns are sad and lonely...I haven't been 'paying for it' in any of those ways. I'm very far from being sad or lonely, I haven't caught an S-T-D, I haven't been arrested, I haven't lost my career, and my friends and family haven't rejected me." He says that if he had insisted, Drawn & Quarterly would have allowed him to call the book what he wanted, (Note: "But let me be clear that my publishers did not force the title on me. I chose to give in to what they wanted. If I had insisted, they would have allowed me to put whatever words I wanted on the cover." — Chester Brown in Paying for It) but Brown allowed the change of title, acknowledging how difficult the book would be to market.

Following the success of Louis Riel, Drawn & Quarterly anticipated high sales, printing nearly 20,000 copies of the first, hardcover edition of the book, for its May 3, 2011 release. The introduction was by famous underground cartoonist Robert Crumb, and the book includes quotes from Brown's peers such as Alan Moore and Neil Gaiman, as well as from writer and former call-girl Tracy Quan, sex columnist Sasha, and a number of academics.

The book reached #2 on Amazon's "Bestsellers in Graphic Novels" list, and on The New York Times Best Seller list it debuted at #2 on the "Hardcover Graphic Books" list and reached #1 that July.

=== Foreign editions ===
Translations
| Language | Title | Publisher | Date | Translator | ISBN |
|---|---|---|---|---|---|
| Italian | Io le pago | Coconino Press | November 2011 | S. Sacchitella | 978-8-876-18048-4 |
| Spanish | Pagando por ello | La Cúpula | 2011 | | 978-8-478-33956-3 |
| French | 23 prostituées | Éditions Cornélius | September 2012 | | 978-2-360-81042-0 |
| German | Ich bezahle für Sex | Walde + Graf Verlag Ag | March 2012 | Stephan Pörtner | 978-3-8493-0013-5 |
| Czech | Sex není zadarmo | Argo | 2014 | Vít Penkala | 978-80-257-1122-4 |
| Serbian | Plati pa klati | Komiko | 2018 | Igor Cvijanović | 978-86-87919-89-2 |

== See also ==
- Autobiographical comics
- Prostitution in Canada
- Prostitution in Canada (Constitutional and case law)
- Decriminalization of prostitution
- Canada v Bedford, the case in which Canadian anti-prostitution laws were virtually struck down
- My Secret Life
- Tales of the City
