= Little Big Man (disambiguation) =

Little Big Man was a chief of the Oglala Lakota.

Little Big Man may also refer to:

- Little Big Man (novel), a 1964 novel by Thomas Berger
- Little Big Man (film), a 1970 film based on the novel, directed by Arthur Penn and starring Dustin Hoffman
- Little Big Man (album), a 1992 album by Bushwick Bill
- Little Big Man (Jakeun gochu), a 1986 South Korean film starring Choi Jae-sung

== See also ==
- Big man (disambiguation)
- Little man (disambiguation)
- "Little Big Mac", an internal name for Apple's Macintosh II project
