= The Playboy =

1990 graphic novel by Chester Brown

- Cover of the first edition
- Creator: Chester Brown
- Date: 1992
- Publisher: Drawn & Quarterly

Original publication
- Published in: Yummy Fur
- Issues: 21–23
- Dates of publication: June–December 1990

The Playboy is a graphic novel by the Canadian cartoonist Chester Brown, serialized in 1990 in Brown's comic book Yummy Fur and collected in different revised book editions in 1992 and 2013. It deals with Brown's guilt and anxiety over his obsessive masturbation to Playboy Playmate models.

The story begins with Brown's first purchase of an issue of Playboy as a teenager. His obsessive masturbation gives him great guilt and anxiety, and out of fear of being caught he repeatedly rids himself of copies of the magazine, only to retrieve them later. His conflicting emotions follow him into adulthood until he purges them by revealing himself through his comics. The free, organic arrangement of odd-shaped panels of simple, expressive artwork contrasts with Brown's more detailed grid-like pages in his 1980s work, such as Ed the Happy Clown.

The Playboy forms part of Brown's early-1990s autobiographical period, and was the first book-length work he planned as a complete story. Brown conceived it as a longer work with what became his next graphic novel, I Never Liked You (1994), but found the larger story too complex to handle at once. The story has attracted praise for its revealing honesty, and criticism from those who saw it as glorifying pornography. The Playboy publisher Hugh Hefner wrote to Brown to express concern over Brown's sexual anxieties in a post-sexual revolution world.

== Background ==
Chester Brown grew up in Châteauguay, a Montreal suburb with a large English-speaking minority; he does not speak French. He described himself as a "nerdy teenager" attracted to comic books from a young age. He sought a career drawing superhero comics, but was unsuccessful in finding work with Marvel or DC after graduating from high school. He moved to Toronto and discovered underground comix and the small-press community. He began to self-publish a minicomic in 1983 titled Yummy Fur.

Toronto-based Vortex Comics began publishing Yummy Fur in 1986. After making a name for himself in alternative comics with the surreal serial Ed the Happy Clown, Brown turned to autobiography after reading such work by Julie Doucet and Joe Matt. The work of his friend and fellow Toronto cartoonist Seth inspired Brown to pare down his drawing style during the early 1990s. He tentatively began his autobiographical period with a pair of short tales, and gradually became freer with his panel layouts and simpler in his artwork.

== Content ==
The story takes place in Châteauguay, Quebec.

The autobiographical story takes place in Chester "Chet" Brown's hometown of Châteauguay in 1975, when Brown was 15. It details his obsession with the Playmates in Playboy magazine. Brown's character obsessively masturbates in secret, terrified of being found out, but unable to resist the urge. Afterwards he feels guilty and sometimes rids himself of the magazines, only to retrieve them. As an adult, he sometimes repurchases copies of issues he had discarded.

The story takes place primarily during Brown's adolescence and finishes at the time of the book's creation. Brown uses a bat-winged figure with his own face to narrate the story and goad Chet in a way similar to the trope of the angel and devil on the shoulders. Chet never acknowledges the narrator, who appears to be visible only to the reader. The narrator talks about Brown in the third person in the adolescent parts of the story, but in the first person in Brown's adult years.

=== Synopsis ===
The story opens in church, where the winged narrator cajoles the adolescent Chet to buy a Playboy magazine he had seen for sale. Chet works up the courage to buy it at a convenience store a considerable distance from his house, in the hope that no one will see him there.

After bringing it home and masturbating to it, he disposes of the magazine by hiding it under a plank of wood in the woods near his house. His building obsession battles his guilt, and eventually he returns for it, a situation which repeats itself throughout the story. His obsession so overcomes him that, even when his mother dies while he is at camp, his first thought at returning home is to retrieve the Playboy he has hidden in the woods. As an adult, he hunts down back issues and memorizes dates and names of Playmate models, and disposes of them over the guilt he feels or his fear of being found out by a girlfriend. His obsession interferes with his relations with women: he relates that, while seeing one girlfriend, he could only maintain an erection for her by fantasizing about his favourite Playmates, and that he preferred masturbation to having sex with her.

The Playboy finishes with Brown drawing the story in progress. Though he knows his friends shortly will read it, he still feels uncomfortable discussing it with them.

== Style and analysis ==

By the end of the 1980s Brown had grown dissatisfied with his drawing style. He began simplifying it after bringing Ed the Happy Clown to an end, as he had been reading work by cartoonists with simpler styles such as John Stanley and Brown's friend Seth. He abandoned the grid layout that he had used and arranged panels on the page in a varied, organic manner. He made the drawings first and only afterwards laid down panel borders, which conform to the shapes of the pictures they enclose and are in a wobbly free-hand—much like those of the Hernandez brothers or Robert Crumb. Brown distorted his images to convey emotion, but not in traditional cartoonish ways. For example, when the adolescent Brown encounters friends of his parents, he does not physically shrink with embarrassment, but does so through distortion of perspective.

Chet is introverted and self-isolating, preferring pornography to communicating with others, such as his brother. Chet takes centre stage in the narrative, and supporting characters make but brief appearances.

Brown depicts Chet's obsessive masturbation, and his uncommon masturbation style has drawn notice: he faces down and rubs his penis between the palms of both hands, a style Marcy R. Isabella likens to a pair of praying hands. The style has come to be called "the Chester" after a cartoon of it by Peter Bagge. He feels terrified of being caught masturbating and his regret afterwards drives him continually to rid himself of the magazines, such as by hiding them in the woods near his house, but always returns for them. Brown's mother dies while he is at camp, which is mentioned only briefly, as when he returns from camp he immediately heads to the woods to dig up the Playboy he had buried there. Comics critic Darcy Sullivan sees Brown in this scene having "shunted aside his painful feelings for her, and for other women, in favor of this tatty fetish". Chet feels surprised at and repelled by a centrefold of a black Playmate he comes across, bringing about the realization of racist feelings he has.

When finishing The Playboy, Brown felt guilt over still looking at Playmates and credits having come out in print with helping him overcome his shame. While many have interpreted the book as a condemnation of pornography, to Brown it is about the guilt he was made to feel for using the media. Some interpretations, such as those of Sullivan and Darrel Epp, see The Playboy demonstrating how the idealized images in pornography distort societal norms and expectations of beauty; one example cited is a scene in which Brown says he could only maintain an erection with one girlfriend if he fantasized about his favourite Playmates. Brown has objected to this interpretation—rather, he sees it as a flaw in the work, in that it does not provide enough context for what he intended to communicate: that he had gotten into a relationship with a woman whom he did not find sexually attractive, and that if Playboy did not exist he would have fantasized about other images of women.

Critic Darcy Sullivan saw the book as presenting how Brown's Playboy obsession affects his ability to relate to women. Sullivan called The Playboy stories "[t]he most honest sex in comics" of the early 1990s, "and the most damning exposé of pornography" as it deals "with nothing more than Brown's relationship with Playboy". He praises how quickly Brown matured as a storyteller over the course of The Playboy, and for the believability of scenes which may or may not have happened as Brown depicted them. While seeming to acknowledge feminist concerns, Brown depicts himself as "a victim of his urges", and that "Playboy has kept him mentally separate". Sullivan asserts the book shows that pornography does not merely satisfy a need, but fosters an addiction. Brown's comics raise questions, rather than trying to answer them, an approach Sullivan compared favourably to that of Joe Matt's less subtle body of work, which also details a pornography obsession: he wrote that Matt's comics analyze and rationalize his obsession, while Brown's reveal.

== Publication ==
Brown had run into problems doing autobiographical stories of his contemporary life, as his story interconnected with the stories of those around him—the friends he portrayed did not always agree with the way he pictured them. He portrays his friend Kris's negative reaction in "Showing Helder" to his depiction of her in "Helder". Brown turned to tales of his teenage years, as he had lost contact with most of those he knew from that time. Brown stated that he intended a longer story encompassing what ended up in The Playboy and the following graphic novel, I Never Liked You (1994), but when planning it he found it was too complex. He said he had a clear idea of the stories from his life that he would use, and the general shape of the narrative, but he had a "sense of improvising" as he did not script it out beforehand.

The serialization appeared under the title Disgust in issues # 21–23 of Yummy Fur, at the time published by Vortex Comics. With the twenty-fifth issue of Yummy Fur in 1991, Brown switched publishers to the Montreal-based Drawn & Quarterly, who published a collected and revised edition of The Playboy in 1992; this was the first graphic novel from the publisher. Brown rescripted, relettered, and reformatted the book for an annotated edition in 2013, also from Drawn & Quarterly.

== Reception and legacy ==
The story gained praise from fans, critics, and other cartoonists, and earned a Harvey Award nomination in 1991 for Best Single Issue or Story. The Playboy, I Never Liked You, and several shorter pieces placed No. 38 on The Comics Journal's list of the best 100 English-language comics of the 20th century as "The autobiographical comics from Yummy Fur". Cartoonist Gilbert Hernandez asserted, "The Playboy and I Never Liked You are probably the best graphic novels next to Maus". Critic Frank Young called it a "pivotal work" in the autobiographical comics trend of the early 1990s. Critic Darcy Sullivan considered it required reading for those who are serious about comics and a "landmark look at an artist's growth", referring to the pace with which Brown's work matured over the course of the three issues of its serialization.

Brown stated that several women took offense at the book, saying it glorified pornography. Hugh Hefner sent Brown a letter after The Playboy's publication, showing concern that someone who grew up during the sexual revolution could still suffer such confusion and anxiety. Darcy Sullivan compared the pornography-obsessed autobiographical work of Joe Matt in Peepshow unfavourably to The Playboy in an issue of The Comics Journal, to which Brown responded with a defence of Matt's work in a later issue.

Brown's attitudes towards pornography have since changed greatly. When he made The Playboy he was struggling with his embarrassment over buying pornography; two decades later he vocally advocated for the decriminalization of prostitution in Paying for It (2011).

== See also ==
- Autobiographical comics
- Confessional writing
