= Yummy Fur (comics) =

Comic book series by Chester Brown

- Cover to issue #20 of Yummy Fur, featuring the story "Showing Helder"

Publication information
- Publisher: Self-published (mini #1–7); Vortex Comics (#1–24); Drawn & Quarterly (#25–32)
- Schedule: irregular
- Genre: Alternative comics
- Publication date: (mini) July 1983–September 1985; December 1986–July 1994
- No. of issues: 32

Creative team
- Created by: Chester Brown

Yummy Fur (1983–1994) was a comic book by Canadian cartoonist Chester Brown. It contained a number of different comics stories which dealt with a wide variety of subjects. Its often-controversial content led to one printer and one distributor refusing to handle it.

Some of Brown's best-known comics were first published in Yummy Fur, including the surreal, taboo-breaking Ed the Happy Clown and the comics from his autobiographical period, which included the graphic novels The Playboy and I Never Liked You. Also notable were the eccentric gospel adaptations that ran in most issues. The series and its collected volumes have won a number of awards, and have had a lasting influence on the world of alternative comics.

Yummy Fur started as a self-published minicomic which ran for seven issues, the contents of which were reprinted in the first three issues of the Vortex Comics series which started publication in December 1986. The series switched publishers to Drawn & Quarterly in 1991 until the end of its run in 1994, when Brown started on his Underwater series.

== Overview ==
Yummy Fur came at a time when alternative comics was still young, and is considered one of its defining titles. It was one of the earliest examples of a comic that would have its first success as a self-published mini. It started in an era when comic books and their characters were generally considered to be ongoing, and finished when the self-contained stories of the graphic novel had begun to come into prominence. Brown's ambitions changed in step, Yummy Fur started with Ed the Happy Clown, which Brown originally did not intend to have an ending; towards the end, he serialized two works, The Playboy and I Never Liked You, which were conceived from the start as self-complete works. Brown would thereafter make the production of graphic novels the main focus of his output.

Yummy Fur quickly gained a reputation for taboo-breaking—Ed the Happy Clown's plot revolved around a character who could not stop defecating, and whose anus was a gateway to another dimension; then-U.S. President Ronald Reagan's head attached to the end of the protagonist's penis; and a beautiful female vampire, who is out to get revenge on the boyfriend who murdered her, and who usually appears entirely naked. Later, in The Playboy, Brown would detail his adolescent obsession with the Playboy Playmates in Playboy magazine, including explicit scenes of his teenage self masturbating and ejaculating. In the short "Danny's Story", Brown had himself picking his nose, and finished with him biting his neighbour. The book was often wrapped in plastic with an "adults only" label on it, although it is not known if any issues of Yummy Fur were ever banned from any comic shop.

The edgy content of the book was contrasted with his straight adaptations of the Gospels which appeared in most issues of Yummy Fur—albeit, adaptations that took a "warts and all" approach, in which characters pick their noses and Jesus is going bald.

Yummy Fur had been a catch-all title for Brown's work, but since bringing the series to an end in 1994, he has published new stories, like Underwater and Louis Riel, under their own titles. Much of the work from the series has been republished in book form—the short work in The Little Man—but the Gospel stories and most of the later instalments of Ed the Happy Clown remain uncollected.

== Stories ==
=== Ed the Happy Clown ===
The story that first drew attention for Brown's work—a surreal, scatological tale of dark humour. The story was improvised for the most part, and grew out of a number of completely unrelated short comics that appeared in the earliest issues of Yummy Fur. The story follows the large-headed, childlike Ed, a children's clown, who, after being submerged in the faeces of a man who can't stop defecating, finds the head of his penis has been replaced with the head of a miniature Ronald Reagan.

The story makes use of a wide variety of media and comic-book tropes and clichés, such as vampires, werewolves, Frankenstein's monster, aliens, alternative dimensions and cannibal pygmies, as well as a lot of dark religious imagery and potentially offensive imagery—nudity, sex, graphic violence and body horror.

Ed was intended to be a character Brown would use throughout his career, but after the first dozen issues, he grew dissatisfied with the direction the story had taken, and also wanted to change his drawing style. Inspired by the autobiographical comics of Julie Doucet and Joe Matt, Brown decided to bring the Ed story to an end in issue #18 of Yummy Fur and spent the next few years focusing on revealing autobiographical stories.

=== Gospels ===
Brown's straight-faced cartoon adaptations of the Gospel of Mark and the Gospel of Matthew, started as Brown, who had been raised in a strictly Baptist household, tried to find out for himself what Christ was all about, and what he really believed. The Gospel of Mark began in the fourth issue of the Vortex series, which was the first issue of new material. The Gospel of Matthew started in issue #15 of Yummy Fur and continued in most issues through the end of the series, and in all but the first issue of Underwater. Matthew is unfinished and has not continued since 1997.

=== Autobiographical comics ===
After completing Ed, Brown moved on to a series of personally revealing autobiographical stories, starting with "Helder" in Yummy Fur #19. The drawing style, done with a brush, became more and more sparse in an attempt to move away from the style of Ed the Happy Clown, which Brown had grown uncomfortable with. Most of the shorter stories, like "Helder", "Showing Helder" and "Danny's Story", took place not long before they were written, but the longer graphic novels took place mostly in Brown's adolescence in the 1970s.

==== Disgust/The Playboy ====
Narrated by a winged, not-so-angelic version of himself, the story details Brown's experiences as an adolescent obsessed with the Playmates in Playboy magazine, while wracked with guilt over his obsessive masturbation, and later his difficulty relating to women as an adult. The story is the source of some controversy, as it graphically depicted a minor masturbating and ejaculating and was also seen by some women to defend pornography.

The story appeared in issues #21–23 of Yummy Fur and was originally titled Disgust and later The Playboy Stories. The story was collected in 1992 under the title The Playboy.

==== Fuck (or I Never Liked You) ====
Another tale of Brown's adolescence. Brown has trouble relating with the opposite sex, even when they are the ones trying to connect with him. He is an awkward teenager who never swears, which is picked up by some of the other boys in his school, who constantly pick on him and try to get him to swear.

The story also depicts the final days of Brown's mother when he was 17. Brown is a difficult son, and has trouble expressing his affection for her. She has schizophrenia and dies in the hospital after falling down the stairs.

Originally titled Fuck, the story was retitled I Never Liked You when collected.

== Publishing history ==
=== Minicomic (1983–1986) ===
Brown self-published seven issues of the Yummy Fur minicomic

In the early 1980s, Brown had been trying unsuccessfully to get his work published by publishers such as Raw, Fantagraphics Books and Last Gasp. He was convinced by his then-girlfriend, Kris Nakamura, to take the work he had piled up and publish them himself as photocopied minicomics, distributing them on the streets of Toronto. Sales got off to a slow start, but eventually picked up. "Sales were brisk", with some issues topping 1000 copies, as Brown sold the books on consignment in bookstores, local comic shops, and through mail order, while working a day job in a photography shop. Brown published the series under the "Tortured Canoe" imprint.

=== Vortex (1986–1991) ===
Brown had pitched his work to Vortex Comics publisher Bill Marks before 1986, but at the time, Marks was not prepared to publish an ongoing series. In 1986, at the urging of Mister X artist Seth, Marks finally contacted Brown with a contract to publish three issues, which would reprint the entire contents of the seven issue minicomic series. The contract would be renewed depending on sales. The December 1986 first issue received preorders of 12,000 copies, a considerable number for a small-press, black-and-white comic book. The large number of orders was due in part to the black-and-white comics explosion of the mid-1980s, spearheaded by Kevin Eastman and Peter Laird's breakout Teenage Mutant Ninja Turtles. The boom soon imploded, however, and Yummy Fur's sales dropped to a few thousand.

The book was dropped by a printer in the province of Ontario after the printer had used discarded pages of the fourth issue of Yummy Fur to pack boxes of a feminist publication. The issue included a nude scene from the Ed the Happy Clown serial in which the character, Chet, stabs his girlfriend, Josie, while they had sex. The feminist publisher lodged a complaint, and the printer informed Vortex that they would not handle Yummy Fur anymore. In 1989, the bindery Packaging Services & Supplies of Wisconisin refused to bind the first Yummy Fur collection and an Omaha the Cat Dancer collection, citing that employees found the content offensive; a spokesman for the company called them "worse than pornography".

Sales saw their lowest point with issue #9, at 1673 copies, largely due to the fact that Diamond Comic Distributors had dropped the book—purportedly for low sales, despite the fact that Yummy Fur had been getting more orders than many other Vortex titles that hadn't been dropped. It was suspected that the book had actually been dropped due to its potentially offensive content. The Comics Journal had begun to investigate the incident, but a few issues later, Diamond started including Yummy Fur in its catalogue again, and sales started to rise, eventually reaching 7000 copies per issue.

=== Drawn & Quarterly (1991–1994) ===
Drawn & Quarterly publisher Chris Oliveros had been courting Brown for his newly established Montréal-based company, but Brown was comfortable where he was, and felt loyalty to Bill Marks for giving him his big break. While Marks had a poor reputation for his treatment of other cartoonists, Brown felt that he had been treated well. In 1991, just as his contract with Vortex had come up, Oliveros offered Brown an enticing deal—a 25% royalty, as compared to 13% at Vortex. That, combined with the fact that Julie Doucet and Seth had jumped aboard Oliveros' ship, convinced Brown join Drawn & Quarterly, starting with the 25th issue of Yummy Fur.

Brown did not want to leave Marks up the creek, and so allowed Vortex to publish a second, "definitive" edition of Ed the Happy Clown in 1992, with a different ending from the one that had appeared in Yummy Fur. Drawn & Quarterly, however, published in the same year the collected version of The Playboy, which had appeared in the Vortex-published issues #21–23 of Yummy Fur, and they have continued to publish all of his work since.

Oliveros convinced Brown that the Yummy Fur title was no longer appropriate for the direction the book had taken, and Brown chose to publish his next major story, Underwater, under its own title. The last issue of Yummy Fur was #32, and was an issue-long instalment of his adaptation of the Gospel of Matthew, which would continue in the pages of Underwater.

=== Lists of issues ===
==== Minicomic ====
Issues of the Yummy Fur minicomic
#	Date	Contents	Notes
1	June 1983	1. "Walrus Blubber Sandwich"; 2. "The Toilet Paper Revolt"	
2	July 1983	1. "Ed the Happy Clown"; 2. "Mars"	
3	August 1983	1. "Bob Crosby and his Electric TV"; 2. "City Swine"	
4	September 1983	1. "Catlick Creek"; 2. "The Eyelid Burial"; 3. "Adventures in Science"; 4. "Fire with Fire"	12 pages
5	January 1984	1. "Ed and the Beanstalk"	
6		1. "Adventures in Science"; 2. "Joke Time"; 3. "Joke Time"; 4. "Crime and Punishment with Ed the Happy Clown"	
7	September 1985	1. "Adventures in Science"; 2. "Garbage Day"; 3. "My Old Neighborhood"; 4. "The Man Who Couldn't Stop"; 5. "An Authentic Innuit Folk Song"; 6. "I Live in the Bottomless Pit"; 7. "Ed the Happy Clown in Confinement"; 8. "Adventures in Science"	20 pages

Most issues were eight pages long, and were photocopied on sheets of 8 1/2" x 11" paper, folded in half and stapled together. In February 1985, Brown put out a 48-page, digest-sized compilation of the first six issues, with an extra one-page strip called "Fire with Fire".

Brown filled up the first four issues with material that he had produced since 1980, putting out one issue per month. After the fourth issue, his backlog ran out. He had to start producing new material, and Yummy Fur's frequency dropped.

==== Comic book ====
All issues had black-and-white contents printed on newsprint, with colour outer covers on heavier stock paper.

Issues of the Yummy Fur comic book
#	Date	Main Story	Gospel Stories	Publisher	Notes
1	December 1986	Ed the Happy Clown		Vortex Comics	Reprints the minicomic issues #1–3
2	January 1987	Ed the Happy Clown		Vortex Comics	Reprints the minicomic issues #4–6
3	February 1987	Ed the Happy Clown		Vortex Comics	Reprints the minicomic issues #6–7
4	April 1987	Ed the Happy Clown	Mark 1:01–39	Vortex Comics	
5	June 1987	Ed the Happy Clown	Mark 1:40–3:12	Vortex Comics	
6	August 1987	Ed the Happy Clown	Mark 3:13–4:14	Vortex Comics	
7	1987	Ed the Happy Clown	Mark 5:1–6:6	Vortex Comics	
8	November 1987	Ed the Happy Clown	Mark 6:6–7:23	Vortex Comics	
9	March 1988	Ed the Happy Clown	Mark 7:24–8:21	Vortex Comics	
10	May 1988	Ed the Happy Clown	Mark 8:22–9:13	Vortex Comics	
11	July 1988	Ed the Happy Clown	Mark 9:14–10:34	Vortex Comics	
12	September 1988	Ed the Happy Clown	Mark 10:35–12:27	Vortex Comics	
13	November 1988	Ed the Happy Clown	Mark 12:28–14:52	Vortex Comics	
14	January 1989	Ed the Happy Clown	Mark 14:53–16:20	Vortex Comics	
15	March 1989	Ed the Happy Clown	Matthew 1:1–2:13	Vortex Comics	
16	June 1989	Ed the Happy Clown	Matthew 2:14–2:23	Vortex Comics	
17	August 1989	Ed the Happy Clown	Matthew 3:1–4:17	Vortex Comics	
18	October 1989	Ed the Happy Clown		Vortex Comics	
19	January 1990	Helder	Matthew 4:18–4:22	Vortex Comics	Autobiographical period
20	April 1990	Showing Helder	Matthew 4:23–5:10	Vortex Comics	Autobiographical period
21	June 1990	Disgust; The Playboy stories	Matthew 5:11–7:27	Vortex Comics	Autobiographical period
22	September 1990	Disgust; The Playboy stories	Matthew 7:28–8:17	Vortex Comics	Autobiographical period
23	December 1990	Disgust; The Playboy stories		Vortex Comics	Autobiographical period
24	April 1991	Danny's Story	Matthew 8:18–8:27	Vortex Comics	Autobiographical period
25	July 1991	The Little Man	Matthew 8:28–9:14	Drawn & Quarterly	Autobiographical period
26	October 1991	Fuck; I Never Liked You	Matthew 9:14–9:17	Drawn & Quarterly	Autobiographical period
27	January 1992	Fuck; I Never Liked You	Matthew 9:20	Drawn & Quarterly	Autobiographical period
28	May 1992	Fuck; I Never Liked You		Drawn & Quarterly	Autobiographical period
29	August 1992	Fuck; I Never Liked You	Matthew 9:18–9:30	Drawn & Quarterly	Autobiographical period
30	April 1993	Fuck; I Never Liked You		Drawn & Quarterly	Autobiographical period
31	September 1993		Matthew 9:31–10:42	Drawn & Quarterly	
32	January 1994	Matthew	Matthew 11:2–12:45,14:2–14:12	Drawn & Quarterly	

=== Collections ===
The Ed the Happy Clown storyline has been reprinted in a number of formats since: a 1989 book collecting material from the first 12 issues of Yummy Fur; a 1992 "Definitive Ed Book", which leaves out much of the later material and also provides a completely new ending; and a nine-issue Ed the Happy Clown series from Drawn & Quarterly with new covers, unpublished artwork and extensive commentary by Brown.

The autobiography work has been reprinted as The Playboy: A Comic Book in 1992 and I Never Liked You in 1994, with The Little Man: Short Strips 1980–1995 collecting the remainder, along with other miscellaneous short works from other sources.

Brown decided not to reprint the early Yummy Fur stories which had borrowed from other works. The Gospel adaptations also remain unfinished and uncollected.

Year	Title	Publisher	ISBN	Notes
1989	Ed the Happy Clown: a Yummy Fur Book	Vortex Comics	ISBN 978-0-921451-04-4	foreword by Harvey Pekar; not complete
1992	Ed the Happy Clown: the Definitive Ed Book	Vortex Comics	ISBN 978-0-921451-08-2	abridged; changed ending
1992	The Playboy: A Comic Book	Drawn & Quarterly	ISBN 978-0-9696701-1-7	Collects the Disgust/Playboy stories from Yummy Fur #21–23
1994	I Never Liked You	Drawn & Quarterly	ISBN 978-0-9696701-6-2	Collects the Fuck stories from Yummy Fur #26–30
1998	The Little Man: Short Strips 1980–1995	Drawn & Quarterly	ISBN 978-1-896597-13-3	Collects miscellaneous stories from Yummy Fur and elsewhere
2002	I Never Liked You: The New Definitive Edition	Drawn & Quarterly	ISBN 978-1-896597-14-0	Black page backgrounds changed to white; Appendix of notes by Brown

== Reception ==
The series was recognized by his peers early on, such as Seth, who recommended to Bill Marks to pick it up as a Vortex title; and got good reviews from publications like The Comics Journal as early as its minicomic days.

=== Critical views ===
Joseph Witek wrote of the difficulties Yummy Fur presented—in the context of the "high art/low art" split in alternative comics in the 1980s, best represented by division of visions in Art Spiegelman's Raw and Robert Crumb's Weirdo, the combination of Brown's grotesque adventures in Ed the Happy Clown and the straight renditions of the Gospels seem to straddle this line.

Chris Lanier, writing in The Comics Journal, placed Ed the Happy Clown in a tradition that included Dan Clowes' Like a Velvet Glove Cast in Iron, Max Andersson's Pixy and Eric Drooker's Flood!, works in which symbols appear with such frequency and importance to suggest significance, while remaining symbolically empty. He finds predecessors for these works in German Dada and the Theatre of the Absurd.

=== Awards ===
The following are awards or nominations for Yummy Fur or collections of work that first appeared in it:

Year	Organisation	Award	Result
1989	Harvey Awards	Best Writer	Nominated
1989	Harvey Awards	Best Cartoonist	Nominated
1989	Harvey Awards	Best Continuing or Limited Series	Nominated
1989	Harvey Awards	Special Achievement in Humor	Nominated
1990	U.K. Comic Art Award	Best Graphic Novel/Collection for the first edition of Ed the Happy Clown	Won
1990	Harvey Awards	Special Award for Humor	Nominated
1990	Harvey Awards	Best Cartoonist	Won
1990	Harvey Awards	Best Graphic Album for the first Ed the Happy Clown collection	Won
1991	Harvey Awards	Best Continuing or Limited Series	Nominated
1991	Harvey Awards	Best Single Issue or Story for "The Playboy Stories" in Yummy Fur #21–23	Nominated
1991	Harvey Awards	Best Cartoonist (Writer/Artist)	Nominated
1992	Harvey Awards	Best Cartoonist	Nominated
1993	Harvey Awards	Best Graphic Album of Previously Released Material for The Playboy	Nominated
1998	Ignatz Awards	Outstanding Graphic Novel or Collection for The Little Man	Nominated
1999	Harvey Awards	Special Award for Excellence in Presentation for The Little Man	Nominated
1999	Harvey Awards	Best Graphic Album of Previously Published Work for The Little Man	Nominated
1999	Urhunden Prizes	Foreign Album for Ed the Happy Clown	Won

== See also ==
- Autobiographical comics
- Eightball (comics)
