= The Little Man (comics) =

The Little Man: Short Strips 1980-1995
- Cover to the 2nd edition (2006)
- Creator: Chester Brown
- Date: 1998
- Page count: 271 pages
- Publisher: Drawn & Quarterly

Original publication
- Published in: various
- ISBN: 1-896597-16-5 (HC); 1-896597-13-0 (SC); 978-1-896-59713-3 (2nd ed. SC)

Chronology
- Preceded by: I Never Liked You
- Followed by: Louis Riel: A Comic-Strip Biography

The Little Man: Short Strips 1980–1995 is a collection of short works by award-winning Canadian cartoonist Chester Brown, published by Drawn & Quarterly in 1998. It collects most of Brown's non-graphic novel short works up to that point, with the notable exception of his incomplete adaptations of the Gospels.

The collection is especially notable for the cartoon essay My Mom was a Schizophrenic, which Cerebus creator Dave Sim says "was the piece that originally gave Chester the taste for comic-book journalism, the research, the annotations and all the headaches that go with it" in reference to the research-heavy Louis Riel which began soon after this collection appeared.

This book also notably collects the stories Helder, Showing Helder, The Little Man and Danny's Story which, together with the graphic novels The Playboy and I Never Liked You make up the main portion of what is considered Brown's much-lauded autobio period. It was this group of works that was placed #38 on The Comics Journal's list of the 100 best comics of the century.

== Contents ==
1. The Toilet Paper Revolt (1980)
2. City Swine (1981)
3. Walrus Blubber Sandwich (1981)
4. Mars (1982)
5. Bob Crosby and his Electric TV (1982)
6. Dirk the Gerbil (1982)
7. Brad's Enlightenment (1984)
8. Garbage Day (1984)
9. My Old Neighborhood (Note: Although Brown normally prefers Canadian spelling, in this story he uses the spelling "Neighborhood" rather than "Neighbourhood") (1984)
10. An Authentic Inuit Folk Song (1984)
11. I Live in the Bottomless Pit (1984)
12. Things to Avoid Stepping On (1985)
13. Help Me Dear (1985)
14. The Gourmets from Planet X (1986)
15. A Late Night Snack (1986)
16. An American Story (1986)
17. The Twin (1986)
18. Back to Obedience School (1986)
19. Anti-Censorship Propaganda (1988)
20. The Afternoon of March the 3rd (1988)
21. Helder (1989)
22. Showing "Helder" (1989)
23. The Little Man (1991)
24. The Weird Canadian Artist (1991)
25. Danny's Story (1991)
26. Knock Knock (1993)
27. My Mom was a Schizophrenic (1995)

=== The Twin ===
Adapted from a story from the Gnostic text Pistis Sophia.

=== Autobiographical Comics ===
Between finishing Ed the Happy Clown and starting Underwater, Brown started on what's known as his autobiographical period, in which he produced two graphic novels and a number of shorter works. The first of these was Helder which appeared in Yummy Fur #19. Helder, Showing Helder, The Little Man and Danny's Story are works from this period that are reproduced in this collection.

=== My Mom Was a Schizophrenic ===
Originally appearing in Underwater #4, Brown has said he wanted to write an anti-psychiatry mini-comic in the style of a Jack Chick pamphlet. He distributed "a couple hundred" photocopies of the eight-pager, leaving them in telephone booths and bus shelters around Toronto. Brown calls the strip an "essay".

The strip is an anti-psychiatric tract that takes the stance that schizophrenia is not a disease, but a way to label people "-- not by looking for signs of disease but by looking for socially unacceptable beliefs and behaviour." Brown's mother doesn't actually appear in the strip, nor is she directly talked about except briefly in the footnotes, although she appears in The Playboy and I Never Liked You. In I Never Liked You she passes away in the hospital.

Brown intended the strip to cover some of the ideas of R. D. Laing and Thomas Szasz. He first encountered the ideas that would provide the basis of the strip in Szasz's Schizophrenia: The Sacred Symbol of Psychiatry, which he came across in 1990.

The strip is six pages, each laid out in a 9-panel grid, which "seems to be well suited for 'talking at the reader' stories", as it "really lets the author pack in the dialogue". It came complete with two pages of footnotes, which were expanded on in the collection.

== Publication history ==
In 1997, Brown took some time off of doing his series Underwater to put together the Little Man collection. During this time, his father died, and Brown felt that he'd lost focus on Underwater and decided to put it to an end, switching to Louis Riel.

The book originally came with a 12-page appendix, with notes on the backgrounds of each of the stories in the collection. The 2006 edition of the book added four more pages of commentary to the appendix.

== Recognition ==
=== Award Nominations ===
Awards
Year	Organization	Award	Result
1998	Ignatz Awards	Outstanding Graphic Novel or Collection	Nominated
1999	Harvey Award Nominations	Special Award for Excellence in Presentation	Nominated
1999	Harvey Award Nominations	Best Graphic Album of Previously Published Work	Nominated

== Foreign editions ==
Translations
Language	Title	Publisher	Date	Translator	ISBN
French	Le Petit Homme	Éditions Delcourt (Outsider collection)	2009-03-04	Laurence Lemaire	978-2-756-01661-0
Korean	똑똑 리틀맨	Sai Comics	2004-11		8-932905-84-3
