= Yummy Fur =

Yummy Fur may refer to:

- Yummy Fur (comics), an alternative comic book series by Canadian cartoonist Chester Brown
- The Yummy Fur, an indie rock band from Glasgow, formed in 1992, and disbanded 1999
