= Little Man =

Little Man may refer to:

== Characters ==
- The Little Man (The Pink Panther), a recurring character in The Pink Panther cartoons
- Clayton Chester "Little Man" Logan, from the novel Roll of Thunder, Hear My Cry
- Wintell "Little Man" Royce, from the Barksdale Organization on the TV series The Wire
- "The Little Man", a stock character in the cartoons of Sidney Strube
- Little Man (stock character), literary trope / stock character in Russian literature

== Films ==
- Little Man (2005 film), a documentary by Nicole Conn
- Little Man (2006 film), a motion picture featuring the Wayans brothers

== Music ==
- "Little Man" (Sia song), 2000
- "Little Man" (Alan Jackson song), 1999
- "Little Man" (Sonny & Cher song), 1966
- Little Man (album), a 2006 album by The Pineapple Thief
- "Little Man", a song by Little Dragon from the 2011 album Ritual Union
- "Little Man", a song by The O.C. Supertones from the 1997 album Supertones Strike Back
- "Mali čovek", meaning "Little Man" in Serbo-Croatian, by the band Šarlo Akrobata

== Television ==
- "The Little Man", a 1959 episode of Tales of Wells Fargo
- "The Little Man", a 1963 episode of The Jetsons

== Other uses ==
- Little Man (Cheyenne Arrow Keeper), a Cheyenne Holy Man
- Little Man (novel), book written by Canadian journalist G. Herbert Sallans
- The Little Man (comics), a 1998 collection of comic book stories by Chester Brown
- Little man computer, a simplified machine/assembly language computer for educational purposes
- Homunculus (Latin: little man), a term used in various fields to refer to any representation of a human being
- Skiddaw Little Man, a fell in the English Lake District
- The "Little Man", a cartoon used to evaluate stage and film productions reviewed in the San Francisco Chronicle
- Meyer Lansky, nicknamed "Little Man" due to his short size
- Carlos Marcello, nicknamed "Little Man" due to his short size

== See also ==
- Little Men (disambiguation)
- Wee Man, stage name of Jason Acuña (born 1973), American stunt performer and television personality
- Little Boy (or Fat Man)
