= Peepshow (comics) =

Comic book collection by Joe Matt

- Peepshow No. 1

Publication information
- Publisher: Drawn & Quarterly
- Schedule: Irregular
- Format: Ongoing series
- Genre: Alternative comics
- Publication date: 1992 – October 2006

Creative team
- Created by: Joe Matt

Collected editions
- The Poor Bastard: ISBN 978-1-896-59767-6

Peepshow is the title of a 1992 comic book collection and an autobiographical comic book by American cartoonist Joe Matt, both published by Drawn & Quarterly. The book collects strips published in various publications from before the Peepshow series started. The first installment was serialized from September 1987 on, before being compiled into a 1992 book, originally published by Kitchen Sink Press and later Drawn & Quarterly.

== Story arcs ==
The story is divided into three story arcs:

- #1–6 — about Matt's life in Toronto, Canada, and his relationship with his girlfriend Trish and their breakup. Collected in the book The Poor Bastard, 2002.
- #7–10 — deals with Matt's childhood and family in 1970s Lansdale, Pennsylvania. Collected in the book Fair Weather, 2002.
- #11–14 — depicts Matt arguing with his cartoonist friends and obsessing over his addiction to pornography. A new, cleaner style of drawing was adopted for this storyline. Printed in two colors on tinted paper. Collected in the book Spent, 2007.
- #15 — posthumously discovered and published by The Estate of Joe Matt.

== List of issues ==
Issues of Peepshow
Issue	Year	Month	Collection
1	1992	February	The Poor Bastard (1997)
2	1992	May	The Poor Bastard (1997)
3	1992	November	The Poor Bastard (1997)
4	1993	April	The Poor Bastard (1997)
5	1993	October	The Poor Bastard (1997)
6	1994	April	The Poor Bastard (1997)
7	1995	March	Fair Weather (2002)
8	1995	July	Fair Weather (2002)
9	1996	April	Fair Weather (2002)
10	1997	July	Fair Weather (2002)
11	1998	June	Spent (2007)
12	2000	April	Spent (2007)
13	2002	February	Spent (2007)
14	2006	October	Spent (2007)
15	2024	July	

== Collected editions ==
Peepshow collections
Title	Date	Contents	ISBN	Notes
Peepshow : The Cartoon Diary of Joe Matt	1992	strips from 1987 to 1992.	Softcover: 978-1-896-59727-0	Originally published by Kitchen Sink Press; Republished by Drawn & Quarterly in 1999
The Poor Bastard	1996	Peepshow #1–6	Hardcover: 978-1-896-59767-6; Softcover: 978-1-896-59744-7	
Fair Weather	2002	Peepshow #7–10	Hardcover:978-1-896-59756-0; Softcover: 978-1-896-59774-4	
Spent	2007	Peepshow #11–14	Hardcover: 978-1-897-29911-1	
Peepshow	2026	Peepshow #1–15	Hardcover: 979-8-875-00230-4	

== Animated TV series ==
In 2004, it was reported that HBO was developing an animated series based on The Poor Bastard that would be produced by Matt and David X. Cohen. This project was abandoned in 2005.
