= Little Men (disambiguation) =

Little Men is an 1871 novel by Louisa May Alcott.

Little Men may also refer to:

- Little Men (1934 film), a 1934 film based on the novel
- Little Men (1940 film), a 1940 film based on the novel
- Little Men (1998 film), a 1998 film based on the novel
- Little Men (2016 film), a 2016 American film
- Little Men (TV series), a 1998 TV series based on the novel

== See also ==
- Little Man (disambiguation)
