= Pedda Manushulu =

Pedda Manushulu (lit. 'Big Men') may refer to:

- Pedda Manushulu (1954 film), an Indian Telugu-language drama film
- Pedda Manushulu (1999 film), an Indian Telugu-language film

== See also ==
- Big man (disambiguation)
