= Big man =

Big man may refer to:

== Film and television ==
- The Big Man (1908 film), a Russian short drama film
- The Big Man, a 1990 British sports drama film
- Big Man (TV series), 2014 South Korean TV series
- Big Men (film), a 2014 documentary film
- Big Man (2024 film), a Czech stop-motion animated film

== Music ==
- "Big Man" (The Four Preps song), 1958
- "Big Man" (Chase & Status song), 2012
- "Big Man", a song by Status Quo from the album 1+9+8+2, 1982
- "Big Man, Big M.A.N.", a song from Crass's album Stations of the Crass

== People ==
- Bigman (beatboxer), South Korean beatboxer and musician
- Clarence Clemons (1942–2011), nicknamed Big Man

== Other ==
- Big Man (Splatoon), a member of Deep Cut in Splatoon 3 and Splatoon Raiders
- Big man (anthropology), the most influential man in a tribe
- Big man (basketball), type of player
- Big Man (comics), multiple Marvel Comics characters
- Big man (political science), a single person who wields autocratic rule of a country
- The Big Man (novel), a 1986 novel by William McIlvanney
- Great man theory, the idea that history can be largely explained by the actions of great men
- Kadanuumuu, a hominid fossil whose name means "big man" in the Afar language
- Really Really Big Man, a character from Rocko's Modern Life

== See also ==
- Little Man (disambiguation)
- Pedda Manushulu (disambiguation) (lit. 'Big Men'), Indian films
