= Little Man (Cheyenne Arrow Keeper) =

American tribal leader of Cheyenne ancestry

Little Man (Cheyenne: Makeeta) was an American tribal leader of Cheyenne ancestry and Keeper of the Cheyenne Sacred Arrows (Maahōtse).

== Life ==
Little Man was the son of Stone Forehead (Ho'honaeve'ohtanehe)'s sister and thus the cousin of Black Hairy Dog. At the latter's death, circa. 1883, Little Man succeeded him as Keeper (Maahōtse tsévovóhnėhešésėstse). His father was Turtle Following His Wife, and his mother was Running Face. He had a brother named White Beaver (Homa'e Ȯhvo'komaestse).

Little Man, Keeper of the Arrows, reigned during a time when the Cheyenne were rebuilding. He was considered a traditionalist and regularly opposed the Indian Agent. In 1901, the agent threatened to cut off rations if Little Man did not send the children to the Indian schools.

In 1914, Little Man attempted to transfer the Keeper’s responsibility to Old Crow. The transfer was refused by the Chiefs, the Arrow Priest, and the leaders of the military societies. They held fast to Sweet Medicine's rule that the Arrow Keeper must be Tsistsistas. However, at their request, Little Man permitted peyote to be placed in the Sacred Arrow Bundle. He soon died in 1917.

== See also ==
- Medicine Arrows
