= Underwater (comics) =

- Fully painted cover to issue #7 of Underwater

Publication information
- Publisher: Drawn & Quarterly
- Schedule: irregular
- Format: Limited series
- Genre: Alternative comics
- Publication date: Aug 1994 – Oct 1997
- No. of issues: 11

Creative team
- Created by: Chester Brown

Underwater was an alternative comic book by award-winning Canadian cartoonist Chester Brown that was published from 1994 until 1997, when the ambitious project was abandoned unfinished by its creator.

The story was unconventional in that it was told from the perspective of a child who is still acquiring language. The dialogue of the characters is encoded into a "language" that at first appears to be gibberish. As the child matures, the parts of the dialogue start to appear as normal, uncoded English.

The series was unpopular with readers, and Brown gave up on the series after three years, although he has said he may return to it someday.

== Overview ==
The story starts with the birth of twin sisters Kupifam and Juz and was intended to follow Kupifam's life up to her death. In the story as finished, she is still left as a young child who is still acquiring language. The "story seems to weave together dreams[...]with events occurring in the external world[...]Virtually every panel exudes a dream-like quality." As the story was left incomplete with Kupifam still a child, it gave the impression that it was about "captur[ing] a state of infancy", but Brown insists it was "about more than just childhood."

In the story (as left incomplete), we see Kupifam and her twin being born, learning to walk and talk, beginning to learn to read, and start to attend school. There are frequent dream sequences, whose beginnings and ends are not clearly separated form the waking narrative, which, along with the artwork, gives the story a surreal feeling. In the cliffhanger that ends the last published issue, we see Kupifam being taken away in a car by her father, with the twins' sister Lafa helping.

== Characters ==
The characters are drawn in a style largely inspired by cartoonists such as Frank King and Harold Gray. While they act like human characters, they are drawn in a bald, alien-like style, with exaggerated cartoon features and blank circles for eyes that are reminiscent of Gray's Little Orphan Annie comic strip.

Kupifam
The main character; from her birth in the first issue, the story unfolds from her perspective.
Juz
Kupifam's twin sister
Lafa
the twins' older sister
"Yuy"
The girls' mother
???
The girls' father
Yonon Trod
Kupifam's teacher at school; first appeared in Underwater #9

- Publishing history

For a few years, Drawn & Quarterly publisher and editor-in-chief Chris Oliveros had tried to convince Brown to change the title of Yummy Fur in the hopes of achieving higher sales. Brown announced in Yummy Fur #32 that he would change the title and start a new series, as the title no longer suited the contents, and he was about to "begin a new long fictional serial." At the time, Brown had not thought up a title for the series, and told readers to "feel free" sending in suggestions. Some readers' suggestions were printed in the letters page of Underwater #1.

Underwater didn't sell as well as Yummy Fur, which had been selling about 9000 copies per issue. In issue #8, Brown admitted it was "getting harder to" earn a living from Underwater and that the print run had fallen to 5500 as of issue #7. It would fall to 4000 by the end of the series.

=== Abandonment ===
Brown abandoned Underwater after the 11th issue and began work on the acclaimed Louis Riel. Brown had realized he had problems with the book that he didn't know how to solve. At the end of 1997, Brown's father died. Brown figured that continuing with the series before working out its problems would be a waste of time, and his "father’s death had [him] thinking that [he] did not want to be wasting [his] time."

Brown had lost focus on the book:

"For maybe half a year I'd been forcing myself to work on Underwater despite the fact that I had lost my way. So when my father died, it made me not want to waste my time with projects that weren't working out."

— Chester Brown, 2005

Largely the problem was one of pacing:

"I had wanted the project to be about 20-30 issues, and I should have written it out as a full script beforehand. That’s what I had originally intended to do, and then I said, 'Oh, screw it, I was able to wing it with Ed the Happy Clown, I’ll do it again with Underwater,' but Underwater was a different type of story, and 'winging it' didn’t work with Underwater, because the pacing was very important to Underwater, and to tell the story the way I wanted it to be told, to continue to tell it that way, at the pace that I had been telling it in the first 11 issues meant that telling the whole story would take, like, 300 issues. And I didn’t want to do a 300-issue series, so it meant having to re-think everything."

— Chester Brown, 2002

Brown realized that, while improvising something like Ed may have worked, it didn't work as well for stories that were meant to be more realistic, as Underwater, despite its surrealistic elements, was meant to be. After Underwater, Brown took to scripting out his stories, starting with Louis Riel.

After Brown left the series, he long appeared not to have abandoned hopes of returning to it, but disliked talking about it as discussing it may "kill any desire [he has] to return to it in the future." In a 2011 interview with The Comics Journal, however, he admitted that, while he had entertained the idea of returning to Underwater, perhaps giving it the annotation treatment he had given to Ed the Happy Clown in 2004, his "heart just [wa]sn’t in it" anymore.

=== Other stories ===
Along with the main Underwater story, Brown continued his adaptations of the Gospels in the Underwater series—this time continuing with the adaptation of the Gospel of Matthew that he had begun in Yummy Fur #15. Since the discontinuation of Underwater, Brown has left off doing his Gospel adaptations, and the Gospel of Matthew itself remains unfinished. He says it's unlikely he will finish it.

Brown also published the notable anti-psychiatric comic essay "My Mother Was a Schizophrenic" in issue #4 of the Underwater series.

=== Issues ===
Issues of Underwater
#	Date	Gospel of Matthew	Other
1	August 1994	(no Matthew)	
2	December 1994	Matthew 12:46–13:58	
3	May 1995	Matthew 14:1–2,12–23	
4	September 1995	Matthew 14:24–31	My Mother was a Schizophrenic
5	February 1996	Matthew 14:32–15:28	The secret Underwater alphabet revealed
6	May 1996	Matthew 15:29–16:12	
7	August 1996	Matthew 16:13–17:9	
8	December 1996	Matthew 17:10–27	
9	April 1997	Matthew 18:1–19:1	
10	June 1997	Matthew 19:1–20:2	
11	October 1997	Matthew 20:1–29	Last published issue, story left unfinished on a cliffhanger

== Inspiration ==
Aside from the Frank King and Harold Gray influence on the drawing style, Brown had read the lengthy Chinese novel Dream of the Red Chamber when he started planning out Underwater, which "guided a lot of [his] thinking in regards to Underwater, especially the interplay between the dream world and the "real" world." He also says Robert Bresson's "restrained approach" to film left an impression that can be seen on Underwater.

== Reception ==
While Brown published some letters from enthusiastic fans, Underwater was generally not well accepted, The Comics Journal's Tom Spurgeon calling the serialization "a bust", lamenting that it took him about "90 seconds" to read the first three issues. He wrote, "Underwater may be a masterpiece; time will tell. But I wouldn’t recommend seeing Citizen Kane in half-minute segments, either."

The slow pacing was a "frustrating experience" for many readers, "glacial in its rhythms and ungenerous" to readers who were getting the story in periodic installments. Critic Robert Boyd said, "The whole narrative concept of Underwater seems to depend on reading it all in one go, but we get it in little, unsatisfying bits"

== See also ==
- Dream sequence
- Language acquisition
- Unfinished work
