= Joe Matt =

American cartoonist (1963–2023)

- Born: September 3, 1963 Lansdale, Pennsylvania, U.S.
- Died: September 18, 2023 (aged 60)
- Areas: Cartoonist; colorist
- Notable works: Peepshow

Joe Matt (September 3, 1963 – September 18, 2023) was an American cartoonist, known for his autobiographical series Peepshow. His work is unflatteringly confessional, presenting him as stingy, duplicitous, and even abusive, and depicting a debilitating obsession with pornography.

== Early life ==
Joe Matt was born and raised in Lansdale, Pennsylvania, a middle-class suburb of Philadelphia. He had three siblings. His mother was a housewife. His father held a variety of different jobs, including owner of a carpet store and a longtime stint working for Amtrak; in Matt's words, "he seemed to drift from job to job a lot." Matt credited his childhood lack of money with forming his later habit of cheapness. He attended Catholic school through 12th grade.

Matt developed drawing skills by age five, and later said he considered himself an artist all his life. His mother encouraged him in this pursuit, having herself attended the Philadelphia College of Art before dropping out to raise her family. His earliest influences were Charles Schulz's Peanuts and Al Capp's Li'l Abner, which he would collect by clipping the strip out of the daily newspaper.

Matt earned a degree from the Philadelphia College of Art, majoring in illustration. After graduating, he attempted to gain a foothold in magazine illustration in New York, but failed. He started drawing comics in 1987 after getting a job at Philadelphia comic-book store Fat Jack's Comicrypt and doing assistant work for his friend and college classmate Matt Wagner, the creator of Grendel and Mage.

== Career ==
Matt began creating his autobiographical comic Peepshow in 1987. The series examines his inadequate social skills, his addiction to pornography, his cantankerous and sometimes physically abusive relationship with his then-girlfriend Trish, and the lingering effects of his Catholic upbringing. Inspired in part by the confessional stories of Harvey Pekar and Robert Crumb, his work frequently involves soliloquies "to camera". The series sometimes depicts Matt's cartoonist friends Chester Brown and Seth, all of whom have depicted each other in their books.

In 1992, his Peepshow strips were published in series by Kitchen Sink Press under the title Peepshow: The Cartoon Diary of Joe Matt. His work was later published by Canadian publishing house Drawn & Quarterly.

In 2004, HBO began developing an animated series based on The Poor Bastard – a collection of stories from Peepshow #1–6 – produced by Matt and television writer David X. Cohen. However, Matt later stated that "they came to their senses and changed their mind".

Peepshow #14 went on sale in 2006, and a collection of Peepshow #11–14 titled Spent was released the following year. Following Matt's death, a posthumous issue #15 was released in July 2024, with Chester Brown inking four unfinished pages.

During the years in which he produced Peepshow, Matt lived frugally and worked as a colorist to make ends meet, particularly for Comico on the ongoing series Grendel and related limited series, and Fish Police.

== Personal life and death ==
Matt moved to Montreal and lived illegally in Canada from 1988 to 2002. He later lived in the Los Feliz neighborhood of Los Angeles, California.

Joe Matt died on September 18, 2023, of a heart attack, while working at his drawing desk. He was 60.

== Awards ==
For Peepshow, Matt was nominated for four Harvey Awards: for Best New Talent in 1990 and for the Award for Humor in 1991, 1992, and 1993.

Matt was nominated for a 1989 Eisner Award for Best Art Team and a 1989 Harvey Award for his coloring work on the Batman/Grendel series.

== Bibliography ==
- Peepshow #1–14 (Drawn & Quarterly, February 1992 – October 2006)
- Peepshow #15 (Fantagraphics, 2024)

Five collections of Joe Matt's comics have been published as books, as well as a "jam" sketchbook:

- Peepshow – The Cartoon Diary of Joe Matt (1992 Kitchen Sink/1999 (Drawn & Quarterly), a collection of mostly one-page strips, usually dealing with a single subject, originally published between 1987 and 1991. ISBN 9781896597270
- The Poor Bastard (1996, Drawn & Quarterly), collects stories published in Peepshow #1–6. This book chronicles Matt's relationship and breakup with then-girlfriend Trish. ISBN 9780224081955
- Joe Matt's "Jam" Sketchbook , 1998, Collaborations with Chris Ware, Seth, Chester Brown, Julie Doucet, Adrian Tomine, Max, Jason Lutes, Dave Sim, Will Eisner, Marc Bell, James Kochalka, Ivan Brunetti, Steven Weisman, etc., limited print.
- Fair Weather (2002, Drawn & Quarterly), collects Peepshow #7–10. In this book Matt chronicles an episode from his childhood in 1970s suburbia. ISBN 9781896597744
- Spent (2007, Drawn & Quarterly), collects Peepshow #11–14. In this book, Matt chronicles a story arc that documents his obsessive "editing" of porn videos. ISBN 9781897299111
- Peepshow (2026, Fantagraphics) - hardcover collection of issues #1-15. ISBN 9798875002304
