= Drawn & Quarterly =

Canadian publishing house

- Founded: 1990
- Founder: Chris Oliveros
- Country of origin: Canada
- Headquarters location: Montreal, Quebec
- Distribution: Macmillan (US); Raincoast Books (Canada); Publishers Group UK (UK)
- Publication types: Books, Comic books
- Official website: www.drawnandquarterly.com

Drawn & Quarterly (D+Q) is a publishing company based in Montreal, Quebec, Canada, specializing in comics. It publishes primarily comic books, graphic novels and comic strip collections. The books it publishes are noted for their artistic content, as well as the quality of printing and design. The name of the company is a pun on "drawing", "quarterly", and the practice of hanging, drawing and quartering. Initially it specialized in underground and alternative comics, but has since expanded into classic reprints and translations of foreign works. Drawn & Quarterly was the company's flagship quarterly anthology during the 1990s.

It is currently the most successful and prominent comics publisher in Canada, publishing well-known comic artists such as Lynda Barry, Kate Beaton, Marc Bell, Chester Brown, Daniel Clowes, Michael DeForge, Guy Delisle, Julie Doucet, Mary Fleener, Joe Matt, Shigeru Mizuki, Rutu Modan, Joe Sacco, Seth, Elise Gravel, Yoshihiro Tatsumi, Adrian Tomine and Chris Ware. In 2006, Drawn & Quarterly began publishing the Moomin comic strips of Finnish writer and artist Tove Jansson, in book format, in the series Moomin: The Complete Tove Jansson Comic Strip. Drawn & Quarterly has a strong reputation in the comics community and its anthologies have won a number of Harvey Awards.

== Overview ==
Drawn & Quarterly has become one of the most influential alternative comics publishers, along with Fantagraphics Books of Seattle, Washington. The publisher has a reputation for the quality of the books it publishes, both in terms of content as well as the books' paper, binding and design. The publisher's founder, Chris Oliveros, had a hands-off relationship with the artists he published.

== History ==
Drawn & Quarterly was founded in 1990 by Montrealer Chris Oliveros, age 23 at the time.

Oliveros was inspired by Art Spiegelman and Françoise Mouly's Raw to publish an arts comics periodical. He borrowed $2,000 from his father to publish the first issue of the anthology magazine Drawn & Quarterly, which debuted in April 1990. It was intended to be published four times a year, containing short arts comics. Soon, Oliveros realized there were arts comics which were too long to be contained in his magazine, and began publishing stand-alone comic books and graphic novels, beginning with Julie Doucet's comic book Dirty Plotte. Seth, Joe Matt, and Chester Brown, Toronto-based cartoonists who soon became associated with the publisher. In the early 2000s, Brown had a surprise bestseller with Louis Riel. In 2003, A Drawn & Quarterly Manifesto was released, describing to booksellers how to stock and sell graphic novels.

As graphic novels became more popular with the public, Oliveros found the need for a publicist. He asked Peggy Burns, who was doing such work at DC Comics, if she knew someone who could fill the job. Burns offered herself, and moved from New York City to Montreal. She was the company's third employee, and soon signed a distribution deal for the publisher with Farrar, Straus and Giroux, which greatly expanded the company's exposure, while giving it a literary air. Drawn & Quarterly reduced the number of serialized titles it published, focusing on book-form comics such as collections and graphic novels. As of 2012, the company employed 16 people.

While at first publishing mainly Canadian and American artists, during the 2000s the publisher expanded its catalogue with European artists like Philippe Dupuy and Charles Berbérian, Lewis Trondheim, and Guy Delisle, as well as exploring the Japanese gekiga movement. It also began publishing the works of Shigeru Mizuki, Susumu Katsumata, Yoshihiro Tatsumi, Oji Suzuki, and Seiichi Hayashi for the first time in English.

In 2015, the publisher produced a collection titled Drawn & Quarterly: Twenty-Five Years of Contemporary Cartooning, Comics and Graphic Novels, featuring of out-of-print work, remembrances, and essays by well-known writers such as Margaret Atwood. The same year, Oliveros stepped down as publisher to focus on his own cartooning, intending to self-publish the graphic novel The Envelope Manufacturer. In his place, Burns took over as publisher and creative director Tom Devlin became executive editor. In the summer of 2023, it was announced that Oliveros had sold Drawn & Quarterly to Burns, Devlin, VP Editorial Tracy Hurren, and VP Marketing & Sales Julia Pohl-Miranda.

In November 2023, employees of Drawn & Quarterly formed a union with the Fédération du Commerce under the Confédération des Syndicats Nationaux, with certification from the Administrative Labor Tribunal of Quebec.

== Librairie Drawn & Quarterly ==
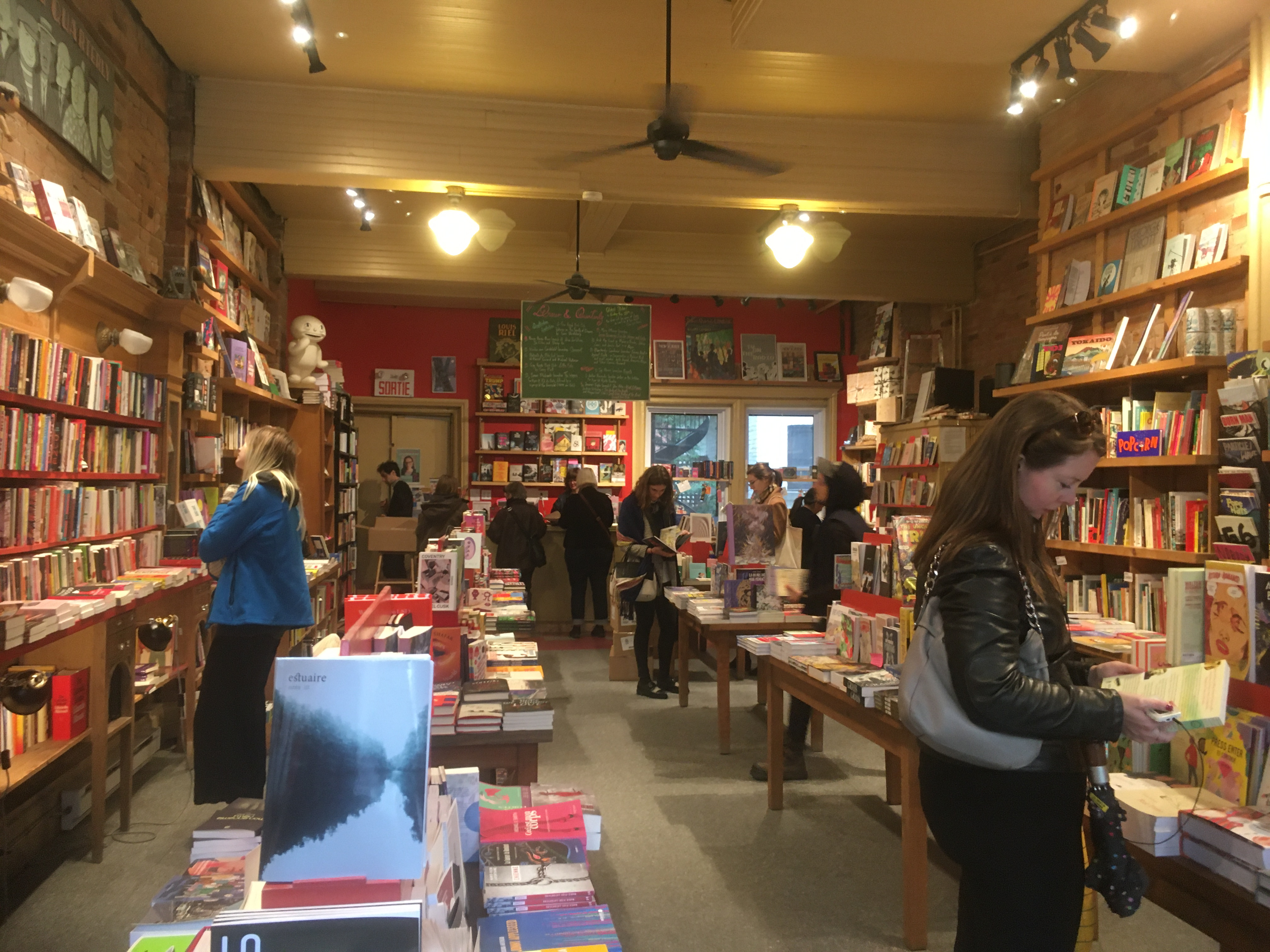
Drawn & Quarterly Bookstore, Mile End, Montreal

In 2007, Drawn & Quarterly opened an English-language bookshop on Bernard Street in Mile End, Montreal, selling graphic novels, prose literature, non-fiction, poetry and fine art books. In 2017, the store expanded and opened La Petite Librairie Drawn & Quarterly, a children's bookshop during the day and event space at night.

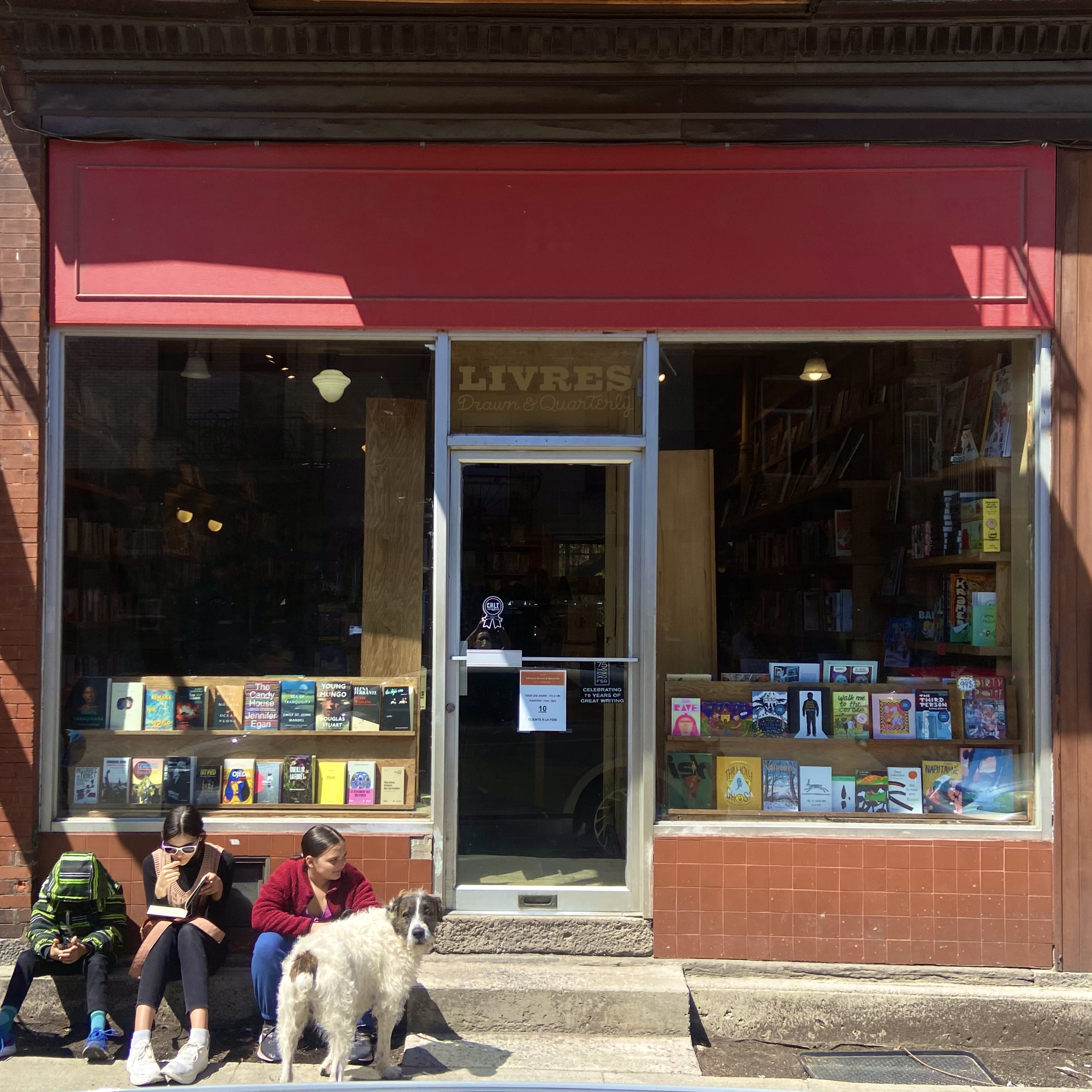
Exterior of Librairie Drawn and Quarterly, image taken in Spring 2022

Over the years, Librairie D+Q has become one of the leading stores in Canada and North America. The store has hosted events with their own cartoonists such as Lynda Barry, Adrian Tomine, Chris Ware, Leanne Shapton, Seth, Chester Brown as well as novelists including Margaret Atwood, Neil Gaiman, Junot Diaz, Paul Auster, Sheila Heti, Miranda July, David Byrne, Gloria Steinem, Roxane Gay, Carrie Brownstein, Alison Bechdel and many more.

== Showcase ==
From 2003 to 2008, Drawn & Quarterly published Showcase, an anthology magazine which offered greater visibility to lesser known authors. The magazine presented up to 3 authors in each of its five issues.

== Imprints ==
In 2004, Drawn & Quarterly began an imprint for non-comics art books called Petit Livre. The publisher also has an imprint for children called Enfant, with which they have published the Moomin works of Tove Jansson and Pippi Longstocking comics by Astrid Lindgren and Ingrid Vang Nyman, and contemporary kids books by Elise Gravel, Leanne Shapton and Anouk Ricard.

== See also ==
- Black Eye Productions
- Canadian comics
- Fantagraphics Books
- Quebec comics
- Vortex Comics
