= List of minicomics creators =

This is a list of minicomics creators. People on this list should have Wikipedia articles.

== Alphabetical list ==
=== A ===
- Jessica Abel, Artbabe
- Gary Arlington, publisher (San Francisco Comic Book Company)

=== B ===
- Ace Backwords
- Jeffrey Brown

=== C ===
- Lilli Carre, Tales of Woodsman Pete, Swell

=== D ===
- Julie Doucet, Dirty Plotte
- Michael Dowers, publisher (Starhead Comix)

=== E ===
- Phil Elliott, A7 Comics

=== F ===
- Matt Feazell, Cynicalman, et al.
- Steve Fiorilla
- Brad W. Foster, Jabberwocky Graphix
- R. Seth Friedman, publisher (Factsheet Five)

=== G ===
- Carl Gafford, Minotaur
- Clay Geerdes, publisher (Comix Wave)
- Tim Goodyear, Video Tonfa
- Vernon Grant
- Richard "Grass" Green
- Mike Gunderloy, publisher (Factsheet Five)

=== H ===
- Gary Hallgren
- Kevin Huizenga, Supermonster

=== L ===
- Alec Longstreth, Phase 7
- Jeffrey Lewis

=== M ===
- Jim Main, PPFSZT! (Blue Plaque Publications)
- Jason Marcy
- Ted May, It Lives

=== O ===
- Douglas O'Neill

=== P ===
- John Porcellino, King Cat Comics & Stories

=== R ===
- Ron Rege Jr.
- Jesse Reklaw, Slow Wave
- Leonard Rifas, Quoz (1969)
- Benjamin Rivers, Empty Words, Snow
- Artie Edward Romero, Everyman Comics, Cascade Comix Monthly
- Ed Romero, Realm

=== S ===
- Steve Skeates

=== T ===
- Adrian Tomine, Optic Nerve

=== U ===
- Colin Upton

=== W ===
- Lauren Weinstein
- Larry Weir

== See also ==
- Amateur press association
- Fandom
- Fanzine
- Minicomic Co-ops
- Zine
