= Small Press and Alternative Comics Expo =

- Status: Active
- Genre: Alternative comics
- Venue: Ohio Expo Center (2000–2006); Aladdin Shrine Center (2007–2009); Ramada Plaza Hotel & Conference Center (2010–2014)); Northland Performing Arts Center (2015–present)
- Locations: Columbus, Ohio
- Country: United States
- Inaugurated: 2000
- Organizer: Bob Corby/Back Porch Comics
- Website: BackPorchComics.com/space

The Small Press and Alternative Comics Expo, or SPACE or S.P.A.C.E., is an annual convention in Columbus, Ohio, United States, for alternative comics, minicomics, and webcomics. Bob Corby founded the convention as a gathering place for "the comics and the creators with no distractions." The show is sponsored by Corby's Back Porch Comics, a Columbus small press comics publisher.

Like most comic book conventions, in addition to exhibitor tables, each show features art exhibits, panel discussions, and workshops.

== History ==
Prior to SPACE, there had been a few small press-themed conventions in Columbus, including segments of the Mid-Ohio Con (dating from the 1980s) and a stop on Dave Sim's 1995 "Spirits of Independents" tour. In 2000, inspired by Spirits of Independence, and with Sim's blessing, Columbus small press comics publisher Bob Corby staged the first SPACE show at the Rhodes Center in the Ohio Expo Center. 49 small press exhibitors — including Matt Feazell, Carla Speed McNeil, Alex Robinson, and William Messner-Loebs — came from as far as Illinois, North Carolina, and Connecticut.

In 2001, Sim collaborated directly with Corby, and SPACE became the home of the inaugural Day Prize, administered in person by Sim. 65 exhibitors came from as far west as Portland, Oregon, and as far east as New York City. Columbus-based Jeff Smith made a surprise appearance.

From 2001 to 2008, Sim was a special guest at every SPACE show, often with his long-time collaborator Gerhard. In 2004, Sim was awarded the SPACE Lifetime Achievement Award.

In 2007, with SPACE growing in popularity and exhibitors, the show expanded to two days and moved to the Aladdin Shrine Center. The 2008 show, Sim's last appearance, featured 30 of his original drawings, and over 150 creators and publishers. The 2009 show featured an exhibit of original pages from Carol Tyler's new graphic novel, You’ll Never Know, Book One: A Good and Decent Man.

In 2010, the show expanded once again, moving to the Ramada Plaza Hotel & Conference Center. The 2012 show featured creators like Nate Powell, Carol Tyler, John Porcellino, Tom Scioli, and Eric Adams.

The 2020 show, scheduled for July 11–12, was cancelled due to the COVID-19 pandemic.

=== Dates and locations ===
Dates	Location	Special guests	Notes
April 15, 2000	Ohio Expo Center, Rhodes Center	...	
March 31, 2001	Ohio Expo Center, Rhodes Center	Dave Sim	first presentation of the Day Prize
April 20, 2002	Ohio Expo Center, Rhodes Center	Dave Sim and Gerhard	
April 5, 2003	Ohio Expo Center, Rhodes Center	Dave Sim and Gerhard	
April 3, 2004	Holiday Inn, Columbus East	Dave Sim and Gerhard	Sim awarded the SPACE Lifetime Achievement Award
April 16, 2005	Holiday Inn, Columbus East	Dave Sim and Gerhard	
May 13, 2006	Aladdin Shrine Center	Dave Sim and Gerhard	
April 21–22, 2007	Aladdin Shrine Center	Dave Sim	Event expands to two days
March 1–2, 2008	Aladdin Shrine Center	Dave Sim	
April 18–19, 2009	Aladdin Shrine Center		
April 24–25, 2010	Ramada Plaza Hotel & Conference Center		
March 19–20, 2011	Ramada Plaza Hotel & Conference Center		
April 21–22, 2012	Ramada Plaza Hotel & Conference Center		
April 13–14, 2013	Ramada Plaza Hotel & Conference Center		Graphic novel category added to SPACE Price
April 12–13, 2014	Ramada Plaza Hotel & Conference Center		
July 18–19, 2015	Northland Performing Arts Center		
April 9–10, 2016	Northland Performing Arts Center		
March 25–26, 2017	Northland Performing Arts Center		
April 28–29, 2018	Northland Performing Arts Center		
April 27–28, 2019	Northland Performing Arts Center		
July 11-12, 2020	On-line	On-line due to COVID-19 pandemic	
July 10, 2021	On-line		
May 21 & 22, 2022	Ohio Expo Center, Rhodes Center		
June 10-11, 2023	Ohio Expo Center, Rhodes Center		
April 27–28, 2024	Ohio Expo Center, Rhodes Center		
April 26-27, 2025	Ohio Expo Center, Rhodes Center		
March 28-29, 2026	The Macoy, Hilliard		

== The Day Prize / the SPACE Prize ==
In 2001, Dave Sim and his collaborator Gerhard founded the Howard E. Day Prize for outstanding achievement in self-publishing, in tribute to Sim's mentor, Gene Day. Bestowed annually at SPACE from 2002 to 2008 the prize consisted of a $500 cash award and a commemorative plaque. The recipient was chosen by Sim and Gerhard from a pool of submitted works.

In 2008, Sim announced he was withdrawing from convention appearances (including SPACE) to concentrate on new work. In addition, Sim announced that, beginning in 2009, the Day Prize was going to be folded into the Joe Shuster Canadian Comic Book Creator Awards. SPACE organizer Bob Corby announced the creation of the SPACE Prize beginning at the 2008 show. Entries for the SPACE Prize are submitted by that year's exhibitors, with a list of finalists selected by Corby. The winner is chosen by a group of judges and SPACE exhibitors.

In 2009, the SPACE Prize expanded to include three categories, General, Minicomic/Short story, and Webcomic. In 2013 the SPACE Prize added the Graphic Novel category. In 2016 the SPACE Prize dropped the Webcomic category but added the Junior Category prize.

=== Day Prize/SPACE Prize Winners ===
- 2001: Faith: A Fable, by Bill Knapp
- 2002: Misa, by Tom Williams
- 2003: Askari Hodari #3, by Glen Brewer
- 2004: Owly: The Way Home, by Andy Runton
- 2005: The Lone and Level Sands, by A. David Lewis and mpMann (a.k.a. Marvin Perry Mann)
- 2006: Chemistry-Comic & CD Soundtrack, by Steve Peters
- 2007: Mr. Big, by Matt & Carol Dembicki
- 2008: A Thorn in the Side, by Bill Knapp

=== Award categories ===
==== General ====
- 2009: The Dreamer #1–5, by Lora Innes
- 2010: (tie)
  - Cragmore Book One, by Pat N. Lewis
  - Mirror Mind, by Tory Woollcott
- 2011: The Collected Diabetes Funnies, by Colin Upton
- 2012: (tie)
  - Kiss & Tell: A Romantic Resumé, Ages 0 to 22, by Mari Naomi
  - No One is Safe, by Katherine Wirick
- 2013: Ragged Rider: Tales of a Cowboy Mummy, by Andrew Meyerhoefer
- 2014: Black of Heart, written by Chris Charlton, illustrated by David Hollenbach
- 2015: If the Shoe Fits, written by Emily Willis, illustrated by Ann Uland
- 2016: Woodstalk #6 (According to Plan), by Bruce Worden
- 2017: Refugee Road (Prince Delight), written by Stu Rase & Tara Rase-Writers, illustrated by Will Jones
- 2018: Himawari Share Vol. 1 & 2, by Harmony Becker

==== Graphic novel ====
- 2013: Xoc: The Journey of a Great White, by Matt Dembicki
- 2014: Persia Blues, written by Dara Naraghi, illustrated by Brent Bowman
- 2015: Apama: The Undiscovered Animal (Hero Tomorrow Comics), written by Ted Sikora & Millo Miller, illustrated by Benito Gallego
- 2016: Persia Blues Vol. 2: Love & War (NBM), written by Dara Naraghi, illustrated by Brent Bowman
- 2017: Black of Heart (Narrier), written by Chris Charlton, illustrated by David Hollenbach
- 2018: Far Tune – Autumn, written by Terry Eisele, illustrated by Brent Bowman

==== Minicomic/Short story ====
- 2009: Aliens Poop on Your Children, by Chris Garrett
- 2010: Board of Superheroes #2, by Matt Feazell
- 2011: Sing, Sing, by Paul Zdepski
- 2012: And Then One Day #9, by Ryan Claytor
- 2013: Better Together, by Ryan Claytor
- 2014: (tie)
  - Birds in a Sluddle, by Pam Bliss
  - Blindspot #3, by Joseph Remnant
  - Limp Wrist, written by Scout Wolfcave, illustrated by Penina Gal
- 2015: Bad Sex, by Lauren McCallister
- 2016: (tie)
  - Dive, by Sean Dempsey
  - Far Tune, written by Terry Eisele, illustrated by Brent Bowman-Writer
- 2017: Brain Weather (Anxious Ink LLC), by Alexis Cooke
- 2018: Anemone & Catharus, by Harmony Becker

==== Webcomic ====
- 2009: Introspective Comics, by Ryan Dow
- 2010: Champ 2010, by Jed Collins
- 2011: Spoilers, by Kevin Czapiewski
- 2012: Next Year’s Girl, by Katie Valeska
- 2013: Little Guardians, by Lee Cherolis and Ed Cho
- 2014: Black Rose, by Aaron Minier, Christopher Atudt, and Brandon Peat
- 2015: (tie)
  - Clattertron.com, by Daniel J. Hogan
  - Wonder Care: After School (Vantage: Inhouse Productions), written by Justin Castaneda & Victor Dandridge, illustrated by Justin Castaneda

==== Junior Category ====
- 2016:
  - Ant and the Zombie Spiders Parts 1 & 2, by Harrison Worden
  - Starcatcher’s Quest, by Althea Seilhan
- 2017:
  - Daughter of Brothers & Daughters (Silber), written by Brian John Mitchell & J. M. Hunter, illustrated by Aubrey Hunter
  - The Electric Team Food Adventure, by Abigail Connor
  - The Mule Man Collection, by Max Wolf & Amelia Sealy
- 2018:
  - Be Your Self, by Aubrey Hunter
  - Duncleosteous, by Nevan Bowman
  - Kitchen Chemistry for Kids of All Ages, written by Matt Williams, illustrated by Althea Seilhan
  - Pirate’s Life, by Aubrey Hunter
  - Puppy Dog Tales, by Althea Seilhan
  - Sylvester (Dimestore), by Lucian Snars
  - Super Tooth (Zimberack Comics), by Jackson Connor
  - Swann Castle, by Abigail Connor
  - There Was an Accident... (Silber), written by Violet Mitchell, illustrated by Nate McDonough, Jason Young, Eric Shonborn, Kurt Dinse, Chelsea Fields, Jared Catherine, and Shane DeLeon
  - We Only Live Once, by Aubrey Hunter

== See also ==
- Alternative Press Expo
- MoCCA Festival
- Small Press Expo
- STAPLE!
