= Shortcomings =

A shortcoming is a character flaw.

Shortcomings may also refer to:

- "Shortcomings", an episode of the television series Sex and the City
- Shortcomings (comics), a graphic novel by Adrian Tomine
- Shortcomings (film), a 2023 film based on the graphic novel
- "Shortcomings", a song on the 2018 album Microshift
