= Artie Romero =

American cartoonist, animator and publisher

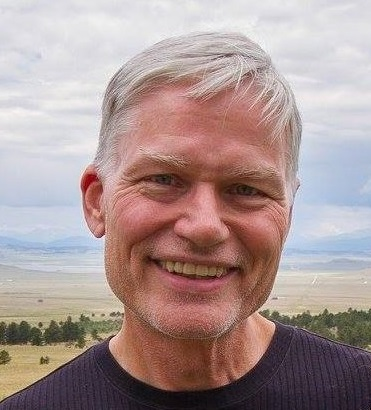
- Artie Romero, July 3, 2016.
- Born: Artie Edward Thomas, Jr. Springfield, Missouri
- Areas: Cartoonist, Publisher
- Pseudonym: Ed Romero
- Notable works: Realm, Cascade Comix Monthly, Johnny Mnemonic

Artie Edward Romero (born in Springfield, Missouri) is an American cartoonist, animator, producer, director and publisher. He began his career in comic books at a young age in the 1970s, and now is best known for his animation work.

== Early life ==
The first child of Wilma and Artie Thomas, he was born in 1951 in Springfield, Missouri, and named Artie Edward Thomas, Jr. His parents' tumultuous marriage produced three more sons before ending in divorce in 1962. Wilma then married Jose Santiago Romero, and Jose adopted the four boys, changing their names to Romero.

Romero decided to pursue a career as an artist after his work was published in his school's literary magazine, and he became fascinated with the technical aspects of printing and publishing.

In an interview, Romero said ″I decided to become an artist when I was about 15. I sent a letter to Stan Lee in 1968, which he published along with my mailing address and his reply in 'Nick Fury Agent of SHIELD #4.' I got a lot of mail from comics fans after that, and I was encouraged to become a fan artist.″

Soon thereafter, he joined the staff of Carl Gafford's New Milford, Connecticut based fanzine Minotaur as a co-editor. Romero recruited fellow student artists and writers to create a magazine, and in January, 1969, the first issue of Platinum Toad appeared. Printed on the school's duplicator, it included poems by co-editor Tom Haber, a cover by Romero, comics by George Laws and Robert Crumb (an unauthorized reprint of Crumb's "Keep On Truckin'"), a short story by Martha Ann Kennedy, and assorted artwork.

== Comics and publishing ==
In his school years Romero published original illustrations by Frank Frazetta, Vaughn Bodē, Barry Windsor-Smith, and Michael William Kaluta in his comics and science fiction fanzine Realm (1969–72). He dropped out of college to help found Everyman Studios, an artists' collective. Other founding members of Everyman Studios include illustrators Rick Berry and Darrel Kurt Anderson, who later founded Braid Media Arts.

Romero was commissioned by Frank M. Robinson in 1973 to create a full page, color illustration for Robinson's short story "Downhill All the Way." It was published in the first issue of In Touch magazine in June, 1974.

In 1974–75, Anderson and Romero were co-editors of a Colorado Springs alternative newspaper, Everyman Flyer, which included underground comix.

From 1978 to 1981, Romero edited and published Cascade Comix Monthly, a fanzine about underground comix with news and artist interviews, including Art Spiegelman, Denis Kitchen, Dan O'Neill, Gilbert Shelton and Trina Robbins. Cascade also published original comix and art by S. Clay Wilson, Spain Rodriguez, Skip Williamson, M. K. Brown, Jay Lynch and other pioneering underground comix artists. Several full-size underground comix, tabloids and a series of 21 minicomics with color covers were published under Everyman Comics' imprint. Several of Romero's minicomics were reprinted, including their color covers, in Fantagraphics' 2010 anthology, Newave! The Underground Mini Comix of the 1980s.

== Animator, producer and director ==
While attending college, Romero began working on animation projects such as music videos, TV commercials and movie titles. He continued to do so from 1981 through 1994 as Everyman Studios, then in 1994 he founded ARG! Cartoon Animation Studio. ARG! currently produces animation for movies, television and the Web. Romero's screen credits include visual effects animation for Johnny Mnemonic (Sony Pictures, 1995), and animated cartoon segments for a children's program, TV Planet (Rocky Mountain PBS, 1999).

=== Early work ===
In 1981, Romero's publishing company Everyman Studios expanded into commercial animation production, hiring animators William Kirk Kennedy, Jan Johnson and Roy W. Smith, and accepting a contract to produce an animated rock video for the band Gibraltar. A work print of the 5-minute film "King's Elevator" premiered at the 39th World Science Fiction Convention in Denver, and subsequently the finished video aired on the nationally syndicated TV series "America Rocks." The studio then began producing animated television and theatrical commercials under contract.

In 1983 the studio produced titles and animation for Frameline Filmworks' Lost starring Sandra Dee and Jack Elam, and in 1983-1984, Romero produced and directed a TV mini-series about video games called Video Game All Stars for the local NBC affiliate, KOAA Channels 5/30. The series included animated bumpers by Romero. In 2022, clips from the first episode of Video Game All Stars were licensed to be included in Pause & Replay, a series of films about the history of video games that is on public display in the Smithsonian Institution's National Museum of American History.

Also in 1984, Romero produced title animation and animated bumpers for Almost Live, produced and hosted by Jeff Valdez. Everyman Studios continued to produce animation for TV commercials, movie title sequences and software throughout the 1980s and early 1990s, converting from film to digital animation production in 1991.

=== ARG! Cartoon Animation ===
In 1994 Romero rebranded Everyman Studios as ARG! Cartoon Animation in Colorado Springs, producing animation for Duracell's national sales meeting and visual effects for Sony Pictures' Johnny Mnemonic. Romero launched the ARG! website Artie.com in 1996, and it quickly became one of the most popular animation sites on the Web. The ARG! site got 1 billion hits in a 20-month period in 2005–2006.

Best known for his work on Keanu Reeves' 1995 cyberpunk feature Johnny Mnemonic, Romero has served as ARG! producer, director and animator on movie projects, TV series, music videos and thousands of animated shorts and commercials. His directorial credits include productions for MTV Networks, PBS, Kaiser Permanente, Harper Collins, AT&T, Transamerica, Safeco Insurance and others.

In addition to its commercial work, the studio recently produced a series of short whiteboard/Flash cartoons, Edward Lear's Nonsense Stories for YouTube and cable TV. Since January 2015, the studio has produced storyboards and 4K animation for TAYEKENI Productions' Adventures of Turtle Taido, a children's television series that is broadcast on Nigerian Television Authority stations. The program was nominated for Best Animation at the 2015 Abuja Film Festival, and was screened at Cannes Film Festival in 2016.

In 2017, the ARG! studio moved from Colorado Springs to Stilwell, Oklahoma. In 2018, Romero sold their original website domain Artie.com to Artie, Inc., a virtual reality startup, and relocated the official ARG! site to ArtieStick.com. Their short film for children, Taffy the Pink Hippopotamus premiered at WonderCon on April 2, 2022, and was screened at the 2022 San Diego Comic-Con in the children's film program.

=== CityStar Group ===
In 1996, Romero founded the web development company CityStar Group in Colorado Springs. The company produced a complex of 300 city directory websites containing listings for businesses and organizations. Romero worked with the Better Business Bureau of Southern Colorado, sponsoring a series of internet marketing workshops, and promoting the Bureau's services. In 2014, CityStar Group's assets were acquired by Blue Roof, Inc., and in 2015 the CityStar corporation was voluntarily dissolved.

In 2022, Romero launched a website development and hosting company, Ozarks Tech LLC in Stilwell, Oklahoma. It creates sites for city governments, school systems, non-profit organizations and businesses.

== Filmography ==
Year	Film	Credit	Award
1982	King's Elevator	Technical director	Screened, 39th World Science Fiction Convention
1983	Lost	Animator	
1983	Beasts	Animator	
1986	Hush Little Baby Don't You Cry	Animator	
1995	Johnny Mnemonic	Visual effects	Winner, Genie Award
1999	TV Planet	Associate Producer	Nominee, Emmy Awards
2014	How Cartoons Are Made	Producer/director	Winner, Top Indie Film Awards
2017	Pedro at the Rainbow Bridge	Producer	Winner, International Independent Film Awards
2018	Turtle Taido in Osun and Kogi States	Producer/director	Winner, International Independent Film Awards
2020	Turtle Taido: The Story of the Elephant (director's cut)	Director	Winner, World Film Carnival Singapore
2020	Monkey & Cat	Producer/director	Winner, Accolade Competition
2022	Taffy the Pink Hippopotamus	Producer/director	Winner, Paris Film Awards
2024	There's Nothing Wrong with Me	Producer/director	Winner, Top Indie Film Awards

== Selected bibliography ==
1968

Cranberry Oblivion covers
Minotaur "The Esper" (artist)
1969
Platinum Toad #1
Platinum Toad #2
Fantasy Realm #1
Beware of the Mysterious Fotato #1
1970
Realm #2 - title changed from Fantasy Realm
Realm #3
Platinum Toad #3
Beware of the Mysterious Fotato #2
1971
Realm #4
1972
Truth 1 Portfolio - with Darrel Anderson
Realm #5 - 1st ed.
1973
Batchwalley - with David Greg Taylor, Jeffrey May, Darrel Anderson
1974
In Touch Magazine - Color illustration for Frank M. Robinson's short story
Everyman Flyer #1
Everyman Flyer #2
Everyman Flyer #3
Everyman Flyer #4
1975
Everyman Flyer #5
Everyman Flyer #6
Realm #6 - 1st ed.
1976
Scrabbits Reno Comics
1977
Scrabbis Treno - with Harvey Kurtzman, Dan O'Neill, Allan Greenier, Larry Todd
Realm #5 - 2nd ed.
Realm #6 - 2nd ed.
Realm #7
Platinum Toad #5
Platinum Toad #6 - with Darrel Anderson
Platinum Toad #7
1978
Cascade Comix Monthly #1 - 1st ed.
Cascade Comix Monthly #2 - 1st ed.
Cascade Comix Monthly #3 - 1st ed.
Cascade Comix Monthly #4 - 1st ed.
Cascade Comix Monthly #5
Platinum Toad #8
Cascade Comix Monthly #6
Cascade Comix Monthly #7
Cascade Comix Monthly #8
Cascade Comix Monthly #9-10
Platinum Toad #9
1979
Star Food Comics - published by Colorado State University Extension
Robot Romance
Bug Infested Comics - with Bob Vojtko
Cascade Comix Monthly #11-12
Real Dope Thrills - with Gary Whitney
Waldo and Emerson - with Jim Siergey
Cascade Comix Monthly #13
Nutso Toons
Samo - with Gary Whitney
MLF Communique #2 - with Roger May, Dan O'Neill, S. Clay Wilson, Victor Moscoso
Cascade Comix Monthly #14
Funny Animal Lust - with George Erling
Captain Nimrod - with Darrel Anderson
Moon Pie - with J. Michael Leondard
Calculus Cat - with Hunt Emerson
Cascade Comix Monthly #15
Cascade Comix Monthly #16
1980
Cascade Comix Monthly #17
Astounding Sci-Bondage - with John Adams
Bar Fly Theater - with Richard Krauss
Cascade Comix Monthly #18
Space Junk - with Larry Rippee
Werks Phase Two - with Al Sirois
Cascade Comix Monthly #19
Z - with Bhob Stewart
Conception - with Jim Valentino
Horrible Misunderstandings #1 - with Roger May
B'ad Comics
Pep Comix
Platinum Toad #10 - limited edition
Yikes #4 - with George Erling
Cascade Comix Monthly #20
Animal Bite Comix - with Doug Hansen
Hobo Stories - with Dave Taylor
More Potatoes
Samyang Ramyon
Cascade Comix Monthly #21
Art 2000
Horrible Misunderstandings #2 - 2nd ed.
1981
Platinum Toad #11
Tales of Mr. Fly - with Bob Conway
Riffs - with Bruce Chrislip
Horrible Misunderstandings #1 - 3rd ed.
Cascade #22 - title change from Cascade Comix Monthly
Cascade #23 with S. Clay Wilson, Jay Lynch, Robert Williams (artist), Spain Rodriguez
1983
Platinum Toad #12 - All Romero, published by Phantasy Press
Stick City - All Romero, featuring Artie Stick
1984
Watch Out for Flying Saucers - All Romero
1986
Platinum Toad #13
Panorama of the World Cycling Championships - poster by Romero
1991
Arnsrarngen Comix #0 - with Jim Siergey, William Kirk Kennedy, David Gregory Taylor
2010
Newave! The Underground Mini Comix of the 1980s from Fantagraphics Books - Romero interview, several minicomics reprinted
2016
Realm #8 - from Phantasy Press, "Best of Everyman Comics" with Hunt Emerson, Rick Berry (artist)
Nutso Toons #2 - with Skip Williamson, M. K. Brown, Rick Berry (artist)
