= Minicomic Co-ops =

Minicomics Co-ops are entities for trading and promoting small press comics and fanzines. The most well-known of these co-ops is the United Fanzine Organization, or UFO, a co-operative of minicomic creators that has existed since about 1968, when it was called Blue Plaque Publications (BPP). Carl Gafford, at that point the publisher of a comics fanzine called Minotaur, created the BPP; among its earliest members were Chuck Robinson II (publisher of Comique), Dwight Decker (True Fan Adventure Theatre), Ed Romero (Realm), and Gordon Matthews (Coffinworm).

== Function ==
United Fanzine Organization
- Abbreviation: UFO
- Predecessor: Blue Plaque Publications
- Formation: 1968; 58 years ago
- Founder: Carl Gafford
- Purpose: entity for trading and promoting small press comics and fanzines
- Chairman: Steve Keeter
- Key people: Chuck Robinson II, Dwight Decker, Ed Romero, Gordon Matthews; Steve Keeter, Jim Main, Kurt Erichsen, Larry Johnson, Don Fortier, Rod Snyder; Ian Shires, J. Kevin Carrier, Nik Dirga, Sam Gafford, John Yeo Jr., Bob Elinskas, Jason DeGroot, Nic Carcieri
- Website: unitedfanzineorganization.com

The BPP was the first small press minicomics co-op. The term co-op has often been confused with Amateur Press Associations or APAs. The difference is that an APA is helmed by a central mailer, to whom the members send copies of their publications. The central mailer then compiles all the books into one large volume, which is then mailed out to the membership in apazines. Some APAs are still active, and some are published as virtual "e-zines," distributed on the internet.

In a co-op, however, there is no central mailer; the members distribute their own works, and are linked by a group newsletter, a group symbol that appears on each member work, and a group checklist in every member zine.

== History ==
=== BPP disbands; UFO forms ===
The original BPP disbanded in early 1972, but was revived later that same year by Steve Keeter, who had been the last of the original members voted in before its collapse. During Keeter's tenure as chairman, the name was changed to the United Fanzine Organization, and a new constitution was adopted. Notable members during this second phase of UFO history included Jim Main, Kurt Erichsen, Larry Johnson, Don Fortier, and Rod Snyder. For a short time, The Comics Journal, one of the most prominent and highest-circulation 'zines of the day, was also a member. The UFO's monthly newsletter, reproduced by ditto, mimeo, photocopying, or later by offset printing, was known as Tetragrammaton Fragments.

=== 1980s: UFO revival ===
When the UFO again disbanded during the early 1980s, it was revived yet again by Jim Main. The group has continued ever since, and many notable publishers in the comics small press have been, and continue to be members. Chairmen have included Ian Shires, J. Kevin Carrier, Nik Dirga, Sam Gafford, John Yeo Jr., Bob Elinskas, Jason DeGroot, and Nic Carcieri. Longtime small-press cartoonist/self-publisher Steve Shipley succeeded Carcieri as chairman in November 2010. In 2020, Steve Keeter became UFO chairman, having been chairman three times previously -- in the mid-1970s, late 1980s and early 1990s. The current chairman is Rob Imes who had been chairman previously from 2012 to 2018.

== Other co-ops ==
There have been a number of other co-ops created over the years, including:

- Small Press Syndicate (SPS)
- Small Press League (SPL) — founded in 1986 by Liam Brooks, Andrew Roller, Will Dockery, David Cushman and Rick Howe
- Pizazz
- Self Publisher Association (SPA) — founded by Ian Shires
- BPP — a new group appropriating the original name, begun by Jim Main and Steve Keeter in 1999
- Minicomix Coop

While each of these groups has its own distinctive character, they all follow the basic co-op format that was established by Carl Gafford decades ago.

== See also ==
- minicomics
- List of minicomics creators
- Cartoonists Co-Op Press
- Fandom
- Fanzines
- Zine
