= Fact Checkers Unit =

- Genre: Comedy
- Written by: Peter Karinen; Brian Sacca; Dan Beers
- Directed by: Dan Beers
- Starring: Peter Karinen; Brian Sacca
- Country of origin: United States
- Original languages: English; French (Subtitled); German (Subtitled); Chinese (Subtitled); Korean (Subtitled); Spanish (Subtitled)
- No. of seasons: 2 (Upcoming third season)
- No. of episodes: 14

Production
- Executive producers: Thomas Bannister; Brian Sacca; Peter Karinen; Daniel Beers
- Producer: Larry Laboe
- Production location: Los Angeles, California
- Cinematography: Mark Schwartzbard
- Editors: Steven Markowski; Ryan Murphy; Kyle Gilman
- Running time: 5-6 minutes
- Production company: SXM

Original release
- Network: NBC
- Release: August 17, 2010 – present

Fact Checkers Unit (FCU) was originally a short film featured in the 2008 Sundance Film Festival starring Bill Murray, and was later turned into a branded entertainment series for Samsung Mobile.

== Plot ==
Fact Checkers Unit is a short television series where the audience follows two overzealous fact checkers, Dylan (Brian Sacca) and Russell (Peter Karinen), who travel the world and stop at nothing to check and confirm every celebrity fact—no matter how big, how small, or how obscure. During their adventures, Dylan and Russell are each assisted by their Samsung Galaxy Note, the branded product.

=== Cast ===
- Brian Sacca as Dylan
- Peter Karinen as Russell
- Kristen Schaal as Paula

The series also features a number of celebrities playing characters with the same name as themselves.

== Development and release ==
Samsung aided in the co-development of the script in order to illustrate specific key elements of the Galaxy Note.

The FCU pilot episode was aired on August 17, 2010, and the first season was broadcast from August 17, 2010 to September 24, 2010. The second season aired from December 12, 2011 to May 25, 2012. Each episode is roughly four minutes long. FCU features celebrity guests including T-Pain, Moby, Zach Gilford, and James Franco.

FCU videos were originally available on-line and on mobile devices through MTV's international websites. Social media campaigning aided in the popularity of the show. Season 2 of FCU generated over 9 million global views within six weeks. The series has been shared through entertainment, tech, and music sites as well as publication such as Variety, The New Yorker, and the Los Angeles Times.

== Festivals and awards ==
FCU has been shown in six different languages and has participated in film festivals such as SXSW, MIPTV, the 2008 Sundance Film Festival, the Geneva Film Festival, and the BANFF World Media Festival. In the 2011 BANFF Television Festival, FCU won the BANFF Rockie Award for "Best Branded Entertainment" for the episode, "Fear of Flying".

== Episodes ==
=== Season One: 2010 ===
- Episode 1: Paranormal Factivity (17 August 2010)
- Episode 2: Fear of Flying (17 September 2010)
- Episode 3: SPF 125 (17 August 2010)
- Episode 4: Gilfanator (17 September 2010)
- Episode 5: Turn Up the Heater with Jon Heder (30 August 2010)
- Episode 6: The Rider (6 September 2010)
- Episode 7: Blonde on Blonde (9 September 2010)
- Episode 8: Fact Master (24 September 2010)

=== Season Two: 2011-2012 ===
- Episode 1: Moby's Grammy (12 December 2011)
- Episode 2: Three-Pain (19 December 2011)
- Episode 3: Excessive Gass (26 December 2011)
- Episode 4: Fly Like a Buttress (26 December 2011)
- Episode 5: Party in My Mouth (26 December 2011)
- Episode 6: James Franco is Preggers (25 May 2012)
