= Brian Sacca =

American actor

- Born: Lockport, New York, U.S.
- Occupations: Actress; writer; producer; comedian
- Years active: 2014–present

Brian Sacca is an American actor, writer, producer, and comedian from Lockport, New York who creates both digital media as well as traditional film/TV content. He is most recently known for playing Robbie Feinberg in The Wolf of Wall Street. He can also be seen in The Kings of Summer, Kroll Show, and United States of Tara. Sacca also starred on the TBS scripted comedy Wrecked.

An alumnus of the Nichols School (Class of 1997), Sacca started his career as part of the comedy duo Pete and Brian with Peter Karinen. In 2007, they wrote and starred in the short film FCU: Fact Checkers Unit with Bill Murray. FCU was later developed into a web series starring Brian Sacca and Peter Karinen. It ran for two seasons. Sacca has written on a number of award shows, including the 63rd Primetime Emmy Awards.

Sacca is the younger brother of Silicon Valley investor Chris Sacca.

== Filmography ==
Film
Year	Film	Role	Notes
2013	The Wolf of Wall Street	Robbie Feinberg	
2013	The Kings of Summer	No Sideburns	
2017	Kong: Skull Island	Chinook Co-Pilot	
2019	Buffaloed	Sal	Also writer and producer
2020	Spy Intervention	Bob	
2020	Hard Luck Love Song	Officer Zach	
Television
Year	Show	Role	Notes
2009	United States of Tara	Kurt	Episode: "Transition"
2009–2011	Single Dads	Brian	30 Episodes
2010–2012	FCU: Fact Checkers Unit	Dylan	14 Episodes. Also Co-writer/Executive Producer.
2013	Kroll Show	Birthday Party Parent	2 Episodes
2016–2018	Wrecked	Danny Wallace	Main Character
