= Jim Siergey =

American cartoonist and animator (born 1949)

- Born: Jim Siergey; October 4, 1949 (age 77)
- Areas: Cartoonist, Writer, Inker, Publisher
- Notable works: 'Cultural Jetlag'

Jim Siergey (4 October 1949, USA) is an American cartoonist and animator. He is known for having created the underground comix strip 'Cultural Jetlag' together with Tom Roberts in the 1990s, which appeared in many alternative press publications, and from 1997 to 2001 in TIME (magazine) and USA Weekend. As of 2019, he is a cartoonist for the Lansing Journal.

== Early life and education ==
Jim Siergey has said that he was "brought up to be a polite boy" and that "music, writing, drawing, wordplay and humor were as much of a pastime while growing up as any physical activity." He grew up reading MAD comics by Harvey Kurtzman, Will Elder and Jack Davis (cartoonist). Siergey has stated that he has been drawing since he "could hold a pencil, for as long as I can remember". He attended Columbia College and began to draw "comix" in the 1970s.

In his twenties, Siergey met Jay Lynch, a trailblazer of underground comix, which he describes as a turning point in his life. Lynch introduced him to Berkley cartoonist Clay Geerdes, who is considered the godfather of the mini-comix movement.

== Career ==
In the early 1980s, Siergey started his career as a freelance cartoonist and animator, working on commercials as well as educational and industrial films, which he continued into the 1990s. In the 1990s, he created the comic strip 'Cultural Jetlag' together with late writer Tom Roberts, which appeared in many alternative press publications, before TIME (magazine) and USA Weekend carried it from 1997 to 2001. As of 2019, he is a cartoonist for the Lansing Journal.

== Personal life ==
Siergey is married to Cindy, with whom he attended Woodstock. They lived and worked in Chicago until 2018, when they moved to Munster, Indiana.

== Work ==
Siergey's illustrations are in black-and-white traditional cartoon style usually with "clever silliness or visual wordplay". He has called them edu-tainment, a term used by Walt Disney. His style has been influenced by the 1928 Walt Disney Steamboat Willie and 1950s Popeye cartoons; his humor has been compared to The Far Side.
