= Hard Luck Love Song =

2020 American romantic drama film

- Theatrical release poster
- Directed by: Justin Corsbie
- Written by: Justin Corsbie; Craig Ugoretz
- Story by: Justin Corsbie
- Based on: Just Like Old Times by Todd Snider
- Produced by: Justin Corsbie; Allison Smith; Douglas Matejka
- Starring: Michael Dorman; Sophia Bush; Dermot Mulroney; Eric Roberts; Brian Sacca; Melora Walters; RZA
- Cinematography: Jas Shelton
- Music by: The Blair Brothers
- Production companies: Synthetic Pictures; Dime Box Entertainment
- Distributed by: Roadside Attractions
- Release dates: October 24, 2020 (Austin); October 15, 2021 (United States)
- Running time: 104 minutes
- Country: United States
- Language: English
- Box office: $69,496

Hard Luck Love Song is a 2020 American romantic drama film directed by Justin Corsbie in his feature directorial debut and starring Michael Dorman, Sophia Bush, Dermot Mulroney, Eric Roberts, Brian Sacca, Melora Walters and RZA. It is based on the song "Just Like Old Times" by Todd Snider.

It was released in limited release of October 15, 2021. It received positive reviews from film critics.

== Cast ==
- Michael Dorman as Jesse
- Sophia Bush as Carla
- RZA as Louis
- Dermot Mulroney as Rollo
- Brian Sacca as Officer Zach
- Melora Walters as Sally "Gypsy Sally"
- Eric Roberts as Skip

== Casting ==
Dorman and Bush were cast as the leads of the film on July 16, 2018. Mulroney and Walters were cast in the film on July 23, 2018.

== Release ==
The film premiered at the Austin Film Festival on October 24, 2020.

On July 19, 2021, Roadside Attractions acquired the distribution rights to the film and set it for an October 15, 2021 release.

== Critical reception ==
The film received positive reviews from IndieWire, the Los Angeles Times, Texas Monthly, The Hollywood Reporter and Richard Roeper of the Chicago Sun-Times. Review aggregator Rotten Tomatoes received 42% based on 24 reviews with average of 5.8/10. The site's critical consensus reads, "Well-acted but fatally self-indulgent, Hard Luck Love Song is ultimately less cinematic than the Todd Snider song that inspired it." Metacritic reported a weighted average of 56 out of 100 based on 8 reviews, indicating "mixed or average" reviews.
