= Shortcomings (film) =

2023 film by Randall Park

- Theatrical release poster
- Directed by: Randall Park
- Written by: Adrian Tomine
- Based on: Shortcomings by Adrian Tomine
- Produced by: Hieu Ho; Randall Park; Michael Golamco; Margot Hand; Jennifer Berman; Howard Cohen; Eric d'Arbeloff
- Starring: Justin H. Min; Sherry Cola; Ally Maki; Tavi Gevinson; Debby Ryan; Sonoya Mizuno; Jacob Batalon; Timothy Simons
- Cinematography: Santiago Gonzalez
- Edited by: Robert Nassau
- Music by: Gene Back
- Production companies: Topic Studios; Tango Entertainment; Imminent Collision; Roadside Attractions; Picture Films
- Distributed by: Sony Pictures Classics
- Release dates: January 21, 2023 (Sundance); August 4, 2023 (United States)
- Running time: 92 minutes
- Country: United States
- Language: English
- Box office: $686,026

Shortcomings is a 2023 American comedy-drama film directed and produced by Randall Park (in his feature directorial debut), from a screenplay by Adrian Tomine, based upon his comic of the same name. It stars Justin H. Min, Sherry Cola, Ally Maki, Tavi Gevinson, Debby Ryan, Sonoya Mizuno, Jacob Batalon, and Timothy Simons. The plot follows San Francisco Bay Area residents Ben, Miko, and Alice as they search for their niches and eventually find themselves in New York City, where they discover their future paths. The film had its world premiere at the Sundance Film Festival on January 21, 2023, and was released theatrically in the United States on August 4, 2023, by Sony Pictures Classics. It generally received positive reception from critics.

== Plot ==
Ben Tagawa is an aspiring filmmaker and film school dropout. He lives in Berkeley with his girlfriend Miko, who works for an Asian American film festival, though he is dismissive of Miko's passion for politics and the Asian American community.

At his day job managing an arthouse movie theater, Ben hires Autumn, a young white woman, as a ticket seller. Miko confronts him at their apartment about pornography she found on his computer, which confirms her suspicions that he has a sexual preference for white women. Ben denies this and tries to invalidate her concerns. While they appear to have resolved the fight, Miko reveals that she has accepted an internship in New York City.

Ben meets with his best friend Alice, a "womanizing" lesbian, at a diner to talk over the news. Alice flirts with Nina, one of the waitresses. When Ben calls Miko, now in New York, he acts dismissively towards her interests. Upset, she says that they should take a break from the relationship. In response, Ben asks Autumn on a date. However, when he makes a derogatory joke about Autumn's experimental art, she becomes upset and rebuffs his attempt to kiss her.

After his failed date with Autumn, Alice invites Ben to a queer house party. Alice says that she is no longer seeing Nina, as Nina wanted to enter a serious relationship, and Alice is only interested in casual dating. At the party, Ben strikes up a conversation with Sasha, a grad student, and they begin dating. While Ben is excited about Sasha, Alice tells him that she has been suspended from her grad program for kicking Nina's roommate, who confronted her about her treatment of Nina. She announces that she has decided to travel to New York, upsetting Ben.

Sasha breaks up with Ben a few weeks later. Although she had told him she was single, she was actually on a break with her girlfriend, with whom she has decided to resume her relationship. At work, Ben announces that the movie theater is going out of business. Ben attempts to call Miko but receives no response, and also fails to make progress on a screenplay that he is working on. Alice invites him to New York, since he has hit "rock bottom".

There, Ben stays with Alice, who to his surprise is now in a serious relationship with Meredith, a Barnard professor. When he tries to surprise Miko at her internship, he learns that Miko has never worked there. Alice and Ben also discover that Miko has been modeling for Leon, a white fashion designer, who she has known since before her relationship break with Ben. Upon staking out Miko's address, Alice and Ben see Miko and Leon holding hands.

Ben rants to Meredith and Alice and assumes that Leon is an Asian fetishist. In response, Meredith asks him about his own racial preference for white women. Feeling defensive, Ben references Alice's physical altercation with Nina's roommate, causing a fight between Meredith and Alice.

Ben returns to Miko's address and confronts Miko and Leon in the street, accusing Leon of having sex with Miko during Miko and Ben's relationship. Leon lets them talk privately in the apartment, where Ben tells Miko that Leon is fetishizing her because of her race, based on Leon's professed interests in East Asian culture. Miko calls out Ben's own hypocrisy for being angry she is dating someone else, as her friend saw Ben and Sasha on a date as well. Miko acknowledges she should have told him about Leon, but he needs to look into his own toxic behaviors and that their relationship is over.

Returning to Meredith's, Ben apologizes to her and Alice for causing their fight and announces that he is leaving the city earlier than planned. While he at first runs towards Miko and Leon's apartment, he sees the happy couple in a café together, so he relents and returns to Berkeley.

== Cast ==
- Justin H. Min as Ben
- Sherry Cola as Alice
- Ally Maki as Miko
- Tavi Gevinson as Autumn
- Debby Ryan as Sasha
- Sonoya Mizuno as Meredith
- Timothy Simons as Leon
- Jacob Batalon as Gene
- Scott Seiss as Lamont
- Mike Cabellon as Ramon
- David Niu as Mr. Lee
- Ronny Chieng as Mr. Wong
- Stephanie Hsu as Mrs. Wong
- Randall Park as Ji-Hun

== Production ==
In March 2021, it was announced Randall Park would direct the film from a screenplay by Adrian Tomine, based upon his graphic novel of the same name, with Roadside Attractions set to produce. In August 2022, Justin H. Min, Sherry Cola, Ally Maki, Debby Ryan, Tavi Gevinson, Sonoya Mizuno, Jacob Batalon, and Timothy Simons joined the cast of the film, with principal photography concluding in New York City.

== Release ==
It had its world premiere at the Sundance Film Festival on January 21, 2023. In March 2023, Sony Pictures Classics acquired distribution rights to the film. It was released theatrically in the United States on August 4, 2023.

The film opened on 404 screens and grossed $300,949 ($744 per screen average) its opening weekend. In its second week, the film dropped 72.3%, resulting in a total box office of $557,496.

Shortcomings was released for digital platforms on September 12, 2023, followed by a Blu-ray and DVD release on October 17, 2023.

== Reception ==
On the review aggregator website Rotten Tomatoes, 85% of 132 critics' reviews are positive, with an average rating of 7/10. The website's consensus reads: "Randall Park's directorial debut has humor and heart, giving star Justin H. Min a swoonworthy starring vehicle with few Shortcomings." Metacritic, which uses a weighted average, assigned the film a score of 67 out of 100, based on 24 critics, indicating "generally favorable" reviews.
