= Minicomic =

Small budget comics

A minicomic is a creator-published comic book, often photocopied and stapled or with a handmade binding such as a saddle-stitched or hand-sewn binding. In the United Kingdom and Europe the term small press comic is equivalent with minicomic, reserved for those publications measuring A6 (105 mm × 148 mm) or less.

Minicomics, sometimes called ashcan copies, and sometimes zine comics, are a common inexpensive way for those who want to make their own comics on a very small budget, with mostly informal means of distribution. A number of cartoonists — such as Jessica Abel, Julie Doucet, Art Spiegelman, and Adrian Tomine — started their careers this way and later went on to more traditional types of publishing, while other established artists — such as Matt Feazell and John Porcellino — continue to publish minicomics as their main means of production.

== Overview ==
The term "minicomic" was originally used in the United States and has a somewhat confusing history. Originally, it referred only to size: a digest comic measured 5.5 inches wide by 8.5 inches tall, while a minicomic was 5.5 inches by 4.25 inches.

Currently, there is no standard format for a minicomic. Anything between something the size of a postage stamp to regular comic book size can be considered a minicomic. The term "minicomic" is used in a more general sense, emphasizing the publication's handmade, informal aspect rather than the format. By this loose definition, a single photocopied page folded in quarters would still be a minicomic, but so would a thicker digest-sized comic, or even a large, elaborate, and relatively expensive photocopied booklet with a silkscreened cover. Even some professionally printed and bound booklets are referred to as minicomics, as long as they are published by the artist and marketed in minicomic venues, but this usage is controversial. Some of these "higher-quality" minicomics are due to the evolution of technology - many technological advancements have made DIY production more accessible, allowing for the production quality of the minicomics to be innovated. This heightened production quality could be anything from more sophisticated color palettes to using unconventional paper stock.

Many minicomics are non-standard comic book sizes for aesthetic reasons, or are often connected to graphic design and book print "tricks" to look good. Many of these typical sizes are convenient for artists using standard office supplies: a US letter page can be folded in half to make a digest, or in quarters for a minicomic. These comics are generally photocopied, although some are produced in larger quantities using offset printing.

In North America, the United Kingdom, and Malaysia, minicomics are rarely found in traditional "direct market" comic-book stores; they are often sold directly by the artist at book fairs or through the mail, ordered from websites, or handled by small bookstores and distributors that carry zines. In terms of production and distribution issues and their audience, minicomics—of all of the sizes and types mentioned above—have much more in common with each other, and with zines, than with any traditionally published comics. In Europe many specialized comic books stores have a special little corner dedicated to the odd off-size little self-printed books. At comic book conventions, such as the one in Angoulême, there are large markets where the little books are available. Because most of the books are rather cheap and were printed in limited quantities (usually a run of 200 copies or so, but sometimes lower than 50), they have become a target of collectors.

Minicomics typically have no editorial oversight, and both their content and quality vary widely. Many of the creators of minicomics do not expect to make a significant amount of money, or even cover their costs, with the price they charge for their comics. Due to this nature of minicomics not being profit-generators, there is oftentimes a higher feeling of freedom in their creation. Jeffery Brown notes, "The great thing about zines is, because they're expected to lose money, there's no economic imperative at work, so you get a purity to the art that rarely happens elsewhere in 'normal' publishing."

== History ==
=== 1920s–1950s ===
The earliest and most popular comics in mini- and digest sizes—predating not only the term minicomic, but even the standard comic-book format—were the anonymous and pornographic Tijuana bibles of the 1920s.

=== 1960s ===
The underground publisher San Francisco Comic Book Company, run by Gary Arlington, published a number of minicomics in the period 1968–1976, including minicomics by Art Spiegelman, Bill Griffith, and Leonard Rifas.

In c. 1968, Carl Gafford created Blue Plaque Publications, the first minicomic co-op, a cooperative of minicomic creators that traded and promoted small press comics and fanzines.

=== 1970s ===
Jack T. Chick's "Chick tracts", which began appearing widely in the early 1970s, use a mini-size, although their content and purpose are atypical of most minicomics.

In the 1970s and early 1980s, Clay Geerdes's Comix World published numerous popular minicomics, and Artie Romero's Everyman Studios created dozens of titles with full color covers. The Everyman Comics mini-series included solo books by Romero, Hunt Emerson, Larry Rippee, Jim Siergey, Bob Conway, Gary Whitney, Bob Vojtko, J. Michael Leonard, and John Adams, plus a number of themed anthology minicomics. Several minicomics each of these publishers were reprinted in their entirety in Fantagraphics' The Underground Mini Comix of the 1980s.

=== 1980s ===
Matt Feazell's popular Cynicalman minicomics, which began in 1980, utilize the US letter page folded in quarters; the same format used by Alfred Huete's award-winning DADA mini.

Many minicomics in the 1980s were produced by artists influenced by the underground comix scene who were unable to get work published in underground and alternative publications. Michael Dowers' Starhead Comix published many minicomics throughout the latter half of the 1980s, before the company moved to traditional comic book printing and distribution.

John Porcellino's King-Cat Comics, first published in May 1989 and still being published, is among the best-known and longest-running minicomics titles.

In 1989 and 1990, Roger May published minicomics made of work done at those years' respective San Diego Comic-Cons. The first one, titled Open Season: the Mini Comic, included work from Jaime Hernandez, Sergio Aragonés, Guy Colwell, Eddie Campbell, Bryan Talbot, Val Mayerik, Scott Shaw, Howard Cruse, Angela Bocage, Stephen Bissette, Mario Hernandez, Larry Marder, Mary Fleener, David A. Cherry, Joshua Quagmire, Clayton Moore, Phoebe Gloeckner, Steve Lafler, Terry Beatty, William Stout, J. R. Williams, Rick Geary, and Paul Mavrides. The second issue, created at the 1990 convention, was titled Graphic Babylon: San Diego Comic Con Minicomix 1990. The all-star roster of contributors included Robert Williams, Orz, Mary Fleener, Mercy Van Vlack, Bob Burden, L. Lois Buhalis, Guy Colwell, Sergio Aragonés, Angela Bocage, Larry Marder, Chuck Austen, Terry Laban, Larry Todd, Mark Bodé, Ray Zone, Larry Welz, Scott Shaw, Michael T. Gilbert, Rick Geary, Phil Foglio, Wayno, J. R. Williams, and Dan O'Neill.

=== 1990s ===
In the 1990s, before the widespread adoption of the World Wide Web, minicomics became a popular form of self-distribution for alternative cartoonists, aided by such publications as Factsheet Five. Comic book series like Jessica Abel's Artbabe, Julie Doucet's Dirty Plotte, and Adrian Tomine's Optic Nerve all started out as self-published minicomics before being picked up by legitimate publishers.

In 1993, Rick Bradford (who had been involved in the minicomics scene since 1985) began publishing Poopsheet, a zine that reviewed other small publications, including minicomics. Poopsheet eventually became a website and is now known as The Poopsheet Foundation, which is dedicated to archiving the history of minicomics.

The Ignatz Award for Best Minicomic has been awarded at the Small Press Expo every year since 1997.

=== 2000s–present ===
In 2003, cartoonists Andy Hartzell and Jesse Reklaw co-founded Global Hobo Distro, a distributor dedicated to hand-made and hard-to-find comics that was partnered with Last Gasp. Global Hobo operated until c. 2013.

== Minicomics collections ==
- Dowers, Michael, ed. (Oct 2013). Treasury of Mini Comics. Vol. One. Fantagraphics Books. ISBN 978-1606996577.
- Dowers, Michael, ed. (Jan 2015). Treasury of Mini Comics. Vol. Two. Fantagraphics Books. ISBN 978-1606998076.

== Alternate meaning ==
The term minicomic also refers to the small comics booklets that come in the packages of some toys:

- Masters of the Universe (1981–2014) — The first Masters of the Universe toys did not have a TV series, and thus came with little story booklets (and later, comics) that showed the original background of the series (He-Man as a barbarian, Skeletor from another dimension, etc.). However, after the later sources (DC Comics and the TV series) started to change that background (He-Man as Prince Adam, for example) the comics began to reflect those changes. See List of He-Man Minicomics.
- Atari Force (1982) — a five-issue series included with certain Atari 2600 game cartridges.
- Swordquest (1982–1983) — three comics included with the Atari 2600 cartridges for the Swordquest series.
- Super Powers (1984–1985) — Kenner Products created a collection of action figures based on the DC Comics super-heroes and super-villains called Super Powers. The first two waves of the collection came with minicomics which featured the character with which it came, one of the villains from the collection (who, obviously, was the antagonist of the story inside the comic) and other heroes featured in the collection. See List of Super Powers Minicomics.
- Transformers (2002–2005) — the toys of Transformers: Armada and Transformers: Energon came with minicomics that featured the characters of the toy lines.
- Marvel Mega Morphs (2005) — this was a toy line created by Toy Biz in order to compete with Hasbro's Transformers. The Mega Morphs were transforming robots patterned on Marvel Comics superheroes. Each figure came with a minicomic featuring the Megamorph with which it came. All six minicomics formed a complete storyline.

== See also ==
- Ashcan copy
- Dōjinshi
- List of minicomics creators
- Miniature book
- United Fanzine Organization
- Underground comix
