= Buffaloed =

2019 comedy film by Tanya Wexler

- Theatrical release poster
- Directed by: Tanya Wexler
- Written by: Brian Sacca
- Produced by: Mason Novick; John Finemore; Bannor Michael MacGregor; Jeff Katz; Zoey Deutch; Brian Sacca
- Starring: Zoey Deutch; Judy Greer; Jermaine Fowler; Noah Reid; Jai Courtney
- Cinematography: Guy Godfree
- Edited by: Casey Brooks
- Music by: Matthew Margeson
- Production companies: Lost City; Bold Crayon Pictures; MXN Entertainment
- Distributed by: Magnolia Pictures
- Release dates: April 27, 2019 (Tribeca); February 14, 2020 (United States)
- Running time: 95 minutes
- Country: United States
- Language: English
- Box office: $29,118

Buffaloed is a 2019 American crime comedy drama film directed by Tanya Wexler and written by Brian Sacca. It stars Zoey Deutch as a paroled convict who, in an effort to escape her hometown of Buffalo, New York, cons and hustles for money and becomes a debt collector, while battling debt herself. Judy Greer, Jermaine Fowler, Noah Reid, and Jai Courtney also appear in supporting roles.

The film had its world premiere at the Tribeca Film Festival on April 27, 2019, and was released in select theatres and on demand on February 14, 2020, by Magnolia Pictures. It received generally positive reviews from critics, who praised the film's concept and the performances of Deutch, Greer and Courtney, while some were critical of Sacca's script and certain plot elements.

== Plot ==
Peg Dahl is born in Buffalo, New York to a poor, blue-collar family. Disappointed in her family's financial situation and inspired by her late father's tendency to hustle, she looks for ways to make money. Through her childhood she studies economics and works small money-making schemes with a plan to attend an Ivy League school and work on Wall Street.

When Peg gets into a good college but can't afford it, she begins selling counterfeit tickets to Bills games. She is eventually gets caught and is sentenced to forty months in prison. When Peg is released from prison she first works at her brother J.J.'s bar cleaning toilets. But then she hustles the local debt collection firm to erase her own legal debt by working for them. She rises to the top but is cheated by the owner of the firm.

At the bar, Peg connects with Graham, who works for the DA and is investigating the shady debt collection racket in Buffalo. They sneak out during a bar brawl and she takes him to her place. She tells him she's quitting her job, so they exchange info and then sleep together.

The next morning Peg announces she's going to start her own debt collection business, but legit, based on intel Graham provided her. She recruits fellow hustlers, from phone sex operators to Asian business owners and a fellow parolee. The idea is like sales, the pitch she gives them is to free people from the pressures of debt.

Peg's firm is successful, but constant sabotage and veiled threats haunt her and pressure builds between her and her former employer. She takes her employees' commissions, reinvesting it in the company. Her former boss, Wizz, not only destroys her offices, but creates problems in her personal life, like taking her brother's bar from him.

Inviting J.J. to dinner, he gets mad when Peg asks him what he's heard from Wizz, as he's often in the bar. J.J. gets up and leaves. However he does stand up to Wizz, who first roughs him up and then gets her family arrested, her mom for hairdressing off the books. Peg loses it, going to Wizz'es premises. She coaxes him out by firing shots into the air, then they physically fight, but the cops stop them; arresting her for setting off the firearm.

Peg and her mom talk in an interrogation room, and she gets called out for always going for money making schemes and not trying to earn money honestly. In court, Peg takes a deal and works with the police to take down the other debt collection agencies.

Uniting the citywide collection agencies at J.J.'s bar, Peg gets them on tape confessing some of their shadier business practices while their offices are raided by the cops. Forty-two people are arrested for illegal debt collecting and before being taken back into custody, she burns over 50 thousand debt sheets equivalent to over one billion in debt. Peg is sent back to prison for destruction of evidence, where she teaches the other inmates finance as part of her plea deal.

Peg is eventually released from prison and returns to her family and friends, who give her seed money to start over. She decides to tackle hedge funds.

== Cast ==
- Zoey Deutch as Peg Dahl
  - Kate Moyer as Young Peggy Dahl
- Jermaine Fowler as Graham Feany
- Judy Greer as Kathy Dahl
- Noah Reid as J.J.
- Lusia Strus as Frances
- Lorrie Odom as Backer
- Raymond Ablack as Prakash
- Jai Courtney as "Wizz"
- Jonathan Langdon as Chris Stephens
- Brian Sacca as Sal
- Jayne Eastwood as Rhonda

== Production ==
In July 2018, it was announced Zoey Deutch and Jermaine Fowler had joined the cast of the film, with Tanya Wexler directing from a screenplay by Brian Sacca. In August 2018, Judy Greer joined the cast of the film.

Principal photography began on July 24, 2018, in Toronto, Canada. Production concluded on August 23, 2018.

== Release ==
The film had its world premiere at the Tribeca Film Festival on April 27, 2019. Shortly after, Magnolia Pictures acquired distribution rights to the film and later released it on February 14, 2020. It also had a special screening at the Buffalo International Film Festival on October 13, 2019.

== Reception ==
=== Box office ===
As of February 28, 2020, Buffaloed has grossed $25,383 domestically.

=== Critical response ===
On the review aggregator website Rotten Tomatoes, the film holds an approval rating of 80%, based on 54 reviews, with an average rating of 6.5/10. The website's critics consensus reads, "This late-capitalism comedy is undeniably uneven, but Zoey Deutch's effervescent performance gives Buffaloed wings." On Metacritic, the film has a weighted average score of 61 out of 100, based on 13 critics, indicating "generally favorable" reviews.

The performances of Deutch, Greer and Courtney were praised by many critics. In her review for The Los Angeles Times, Kimber Myers applauded Deutch's performance, saying she "immediately takes the audience hostage in the opening moments of Buffaloed [...] the actress owns this sharp comedy — and everyone watching — playing the type of character we still don’t see that often on screen." Sheila O'Malley of RogerEbert.com called the film, "a showcase for the mega-talented Deutch", saying Deutch "tosses herself into the role like a maniacal fidget-spinner, all flash and charm." Concluding her review of the film, O'Malley wrote, ""Buffaloed" is refreshing in how it challenges these norms, and in so doing, gives Deutch—who has already proven her comedic acting chops in Everybody Wants Some!!, Zombieland: Double Tap and the Netflix series The Politician—a chance to shine at the center of the narrative." O'Malley also praised Courtney's acting, writing he plays the character "with gorgeous sinister sleaze". TheWrap's Elizabeth Weitzman was more critical of the film, calling it "uneven", while The New York Times' Jeannette Catsoulis penned "Simultaneously rowdy and slick, Buffaloed is exuberantly paced and entirely dependent on Deutch’s moxie and pell-mell performance" Praising Greer, Kristy Strouse of Film Inquiry remarked, "Greer, who has proven to always be counted on in any role, is wonderful", and praised her "compelling" chemistry with Deutch, while Carla Renata of The Curvy Film Critic felt that Greer "flips her comedy prowess upside down while tackling a more serious role with verve and power."
