= King-Cat Comics =

Mincomics series by John Porcellino

King-Cat Comics and Stories

Publication information
- Publisher: Spit and a Half
- Schedule: Irregular
- Format: Ongoing
- Publication date: May 1989 – present
- No. of issues: 81 (as of February 2022)

Creative team
- Created by: John Porcellino
- Written by: John Porcellino
- Artist: John Porcellino

Collected editions
- Diary of a Mosquito Abatement Man: ISBN 097652550X
- Perfect Example: ISBN 1896597750
- King-Cat Classix: ISBN 1894937910
- Map of My Heart: ISBN 1897299931
- From Lone Mountain: ISBN 1770462953

King-Cat Comics and Stories is a long-running, photocopied mini-comic series, authored and self-published by John Porcellino. The series has been published since 1989.

== Publication history ==
Porcellino (publishing under the moniker Spit and a Half) began producing King-Cat in 1989. (The title of King-Cat comes from the Beat poem "Sometime During Eternity", by Lawrence Ferlinghetti, which Porcellino reprinted in an issue. In the poem, Jesus Christ is referred to as the "king cat".)

Content-wise, King-Cat has evolved considerably over the years: through the mid-1990s,Early issues featured themes associated with punk rock and included a mix of aggressive and comedic stories. A popular, ongoing feature was "Trail Watch", where Porcellino criticized the drawing and story elements in the syndicated Mark Trail comic strip. Porcellino also did an entire issue chronicling his (fictional) romantic relationship with Madonna, and did a series of strips following the adventures of "Racky Racoon", a slacker-ish animal who works at a series of dead-end jobs and likes to get drunk. Later issues shifted focus toward philosophical themes and reflections on the nature of life. Porcellino's later work includes adaptations of Zen koans and stories regarding the transient nature of life. The change in thematic focus coincided with a shift in the publication's readership.

King-Cat's letter column is titled "Catcalls".

As of February 2022, Porcellino had published 81 issues of King-Cat (an average of three issues per year).

=== Collections ===
La Mano, Zak Sally's publishing venture, released Porcellino's Diary of a Mosquito Abatement Man in 2005, collecting various King-Cat stories about Porcellino's experiences as a pest control worker. The book won the 2005 Outstanding Anthology or Collection Ignatz Award, presented at the 2005 Small Press Expo in Bethesda, MD.

Another collection, Perfect Example, was released in 2005 by Drawn & Quarterly. Perfect Example focused on stories of Porcellino's final days of high school and the following summer in Hoffman Estates, Illinois. Drawn & Quarterly released the 320-page collection King-Cat Classix in 2007. The 2009 collection, Map of My Heart, published by Drawn & Quarterly, collected material from King-Cat in celebration of the title's twentieth anniversary.

Translations of King-Cat Comics have been published in French, German, Spanish, Swedish, Italian, and Korean.
