= Dirty Plotte =

Comic book series by Julie Doucet

- The cover of Dirty Plotte #1 (Jan. 1991), by Julie Doucet

Publication information
- Publisher: Drawn & Quarterly
- Schedule: Irregular
- Publication date: Jan. 1991 - Aug. 1998
- No. of issues: 12
- Main character: Julie

Creative team
- Created by: Julie Doucet
- Written by: Julie Doucet
- Artist: Julie Doucet

Collected editions
- My New York Diary: ISBN 978-1896597232
- Dirty Plotte: The Complete Julie Doucet: ISBN 978-1770463233

Dirty Plotte is a comic book series by Canadian cartoonist Julie Doucet, published by Drawn & Quarterly from 1991 to 1998. Known for its autobiographical, surreal, and transgressive storytelling, the series explored female experience, identity, and embodiment while influencing a generation of alternative and women cartoonists.

== Publication history ==
=== Original minicomics ===
Dirty Plotte began as a self-published photocopied zine used to record Doucet's "day to day life, her dreams, angsts, [and] fantasies." Her first effort, By the Way (1988), was a one-shot zine distributed for free, followed by the first volume of Dirty Plotte (September 1988–June 1989), which ran for 12 issues.

The title Dirty Plotte combines the Québécois slang plotte, meaning a woman’s vagina (or the woman herself), with the English word "dirty," signaling both the comic's focus on female experience and its provocative, transgressive engagement with sexuality and bodily subjectivity, while also evoking the English word "plot" to highlight its narrative dimension.

Early issues had small print runs of roughly 150–200 copies; they ranged from eight to twelve pages and were sold for 25–50 cents. Doucet produced the comics while working part-time at a copy shop in Montreal, which gave her access to a photocopier, and she initially released issues on a nearly monthly schedule. The early comics were bilingual, containing stories in both French and English, and required readers to navigate her slightly fractured English translations from Quebecois French.

One of the most notable stories from the original minicomics was the four-page "E: Ni Manique!" (Vol. 1, #6, February 1989), later translated into English as “Heavy Flow.” The story features Doucet as a gargantuan, enraged version of herself rampaging through the city after running out of tampons. Its publication in the Fall 1989 issue of Weirdo, edited by Aline Kominsky-Crumb, introduced Doucet to a wider North American audience and helped establish her reputation outside Quebec.

The minicomics remain rare and highly collectible, with some issues selling for hundreds of dollars due to limited print runs.

=== Drawn & Quarterly full-size title ===
Drawn & Quarterly (like Doucet, based in Montreal) began publishing Doucet in January 1991 in a regular sized comic series also named Dirty Plotte. It was the first ongoing solo title published by Drawn & Quarterly, helping to establish the publisher’s reputation for innovative, creator-driven comics and making it a central force in the early alternative comics scene.

Drawn & Quarterly published four issues of Dirty Plotte in 1991 (with much of the content being reprints of material that had appeared in the mini), but afterwards new issues were published once per year. Doucet played with the title of the series near the end, with individual issues called such things as Purty Plotte and Purity Plotte.

Many of the autobiographical stories from Dirty Plotte were collected in the trade paperback My New York Diary (Drawn & Quarterly, 1999), which won the 2000 Firecracker Award for best graphic novel.

== Content ==
Dirty Plotte comprised a wide range of short and long comics — some autobiographical, some fictional, and many surreal. Stories took the form of wordless strips, extended narratives, slice-of-life episodes, and dreamlike vignettes, often starring a version of Doucet herself. No subjects were off-limits: menstruation, sexuality, violence, bodily transformation, and grotesque fantasy, frequently pushing well past the point where a gag comic might conventionally end.

Much of the series was rooted in personal material. Early issues draw directly from Doucet's daily life and dreams, including recurring scenes of domestic interiors, relationships, anxieties, and artistic frustrations. Stories such as "Levitation" and other dream-comics feature a fluid, unstable Julie figure who splits, morphs, or interacts with doubles of herself. Several strips explore dream-logic transformations of sex and gender — characters change bodies, swap or reshape genitals, or move between male and female embodiments.

At the same time, Dirty Plotte featured pointed parodies and satirical responses to sexist tropes in comics and popular culture. Some episodes invert voyeurism and objectification, staging violent or grotesque reversals in which male readers or protagonists become the targets. Other stories took aim at the conventions of male fantasy comics by exaggerating their sexualized imagery or reassigning their dynamics to a female point of view.

As the series progressed, Doucet incorporated longer and more linear narratives, culminating in the extended serial My New York Diary, which occupied most of the final issues. Unlike the more fragmented, dream-driven pieces that dominated the series, My New York Diary is a straightforward autobiographical account of Doucet's year living in New York City, detailing her romantic relationship, health problems, and struggles with the city.

== Themes ==
Dirty Plotte explores a range of themes related to autobiography, gender, and the everyday experience of artistic labor. Scholars note that the series often centers on the "intimate minutiae" of Doucet's life — dreams, daily routines, intrusive thoughts, and anxieties — rendered with an unfiltered honesty that distinguishes her work within alternative comics. The comic frequently blurs reality and fantasy, using surreal intrusions, talking objects, and dream logic as extensions of Doucet’s interior states. These strategies allow Doucet to depict the pressures of creativity, the volatility of emotion, and the instability of identity in a form that reflects how those experiences actually feel rather than how they conventionally appear in narrative.

A major thematic focus is gender. Writer Nicole Rudick observes that Dirty Plotte provides "a kind of negative (if candid) model of femininity," offering portraits of female characters who are angry, ambivalent, isolated, or openly resistant to prescriptive norms. The series depicts the challenges of being a woman in male-dominated creative scenes, the contradictions of social expectations, and experiences of everyday sexism — often presented through humor, self-deprecation, or exaggerated scenarios. Media activist Anne Elizabeth Moore describes the comic as capturing "the isolation of being a driven female creative," and the tension between external pressures to be nurturing and the artist's own sense of self. Although Doucet does not frame her work as explicitly feminist, readers and critics have interpreted Dirty Plotte as a feminist text grounded less in activist rhetoric than in raw, embodied experience.

Dirty Plotte also addresses interpersonal relationships, romantic jealousy, sexuality, and bodily autonomy. These subjects often appear in compressed, fragmentary episodes that mirror the emotional turbulence Doucet associates with her twenties and early thirties. At times the comic adopts a diaristic form; at other moments it veers into satire or horror, reflecting the instability of mood and memory central to Doucet’s storytelling. Across these shifting modes, Dirty Plotte presents a sustained exploration of creativity, anxiety, desire, and the contradictions of womanhood at the end of the twentieth century.

In addition to critical analysis, Anne Elizabeth Moore described Dirty Plotte as addressing “the isolation of being a driven female creative; the jealousy in personal relationships... the ever-present push from the outside to be maternal and nurturing, but the absolute interior knowledge that that is not your way; and the incredibly shifting sense of gender that a strong, smart woman must feel in order to move about in the world."

== Art style ==
Doucet's art in Dirty Plotte is characterized by densely packed, high-contrast black-and-white drawings that combine intricate detail with a loose, improvisational line. Rambunctious interiors, crowded city streets, and swarming objects create a sense of energy and controlled chaos in each panel. Her figures, including the recurring Julie character, are often exaggerated, expressive, and corporeally vivid, reflecting both the comic's autobiographical elements and its surreal, fantastical scenarios. Doucet's inventive storytelling is enhanced by her visual playfulness, such as anthropomorphized objects and unconventional panel arrangements, which mirror the emotional states and interior life of the protagonist. Critic Hillary Chute highlights Doucet's masterful handling of perspective and heavy inking, noting how the dense spaces of her frames teem with details that seem poised to burst out of the picture. Overall, Doucet's style merges autobiographical realism with fantastical exaggeration, creating a distinctive visual language that amplifies the comic's themes of embodiment, identity, and daily experience.

== Issues ==
- Dirty Plotte (mini-comic) 12 issues between 1988 and 1989
- Dirty Plotte #1 (January 1991)
- Dirty Plotte #2 (March 1991)
- Dirty Plotte #3 (July 1991)
- Dirty Plotte #4 (October 1991)
- Dirty Plotte #5 (May 1992)
- Dirty Plotte #6 (January 1993)
- Dirty Plotte #7 (September 1993)
- Dirty Plotte #8 (February 1994)
- Dirty Plotte #9 (April 1995) — titled "Purty Plotte" on the cover
- Dirty Plotte #10 (December 1996) — titled "Purity Plotte" on the cover
- Dirty Plotte #11 (September 1997)
- Dirty Plotte #12 (August 1998) — titled "Purty Plotte" on the cover

== Awards and honors ==
In 1991, Dirty Plotte was nominated for the Harvey Award for Best New Series (Doucet won the Harvey for "Best New Talent"). In 1999, when The Comics Journal made a list of the top 100 comics of all time, Dirty Plotte ranked 96th.

== Legacy ==
Dirty Plotte played a foundational role in establishing Drawn & Quarterly as a major publisher of alternative, creator-driven comics. The series influenced a generation of cartoonists, including John Porcellino, Chester Brown, Seth, and Adrian Tomine, who have cited Doucet's work as inspiring their own autobiographical and experimental comics. Scholars also recognize Doucet as central to the development of women's comics, noting her impact on subsequent creators such as Marjane Satrapi and Alison Bechdel, and situating her within a broader cultural milieu connected to punk and Riot grrrl aesthetics. Beyond other cartoonists, her work has been celebrated for its candid depiction of female experience, identity, and the interior life, influencing readers and feminist-leaning artists alike.

== See also ==
- List of feminist comic books
- Portrayal of women in comics
