= Wrecked (TV series) =

American TV series (2016–18)

- Genre: Sitcom
- Created by: Jordan Shipley; Justin Shipley
- Starring: Zach Cregger; Asif Ali; Rhys Darby; Brooke Dillman; Ginger Gonzaga; Will Greenberg; Jessica Lowe; Ally Maki; Brian Sacca; James Scott
- Country of origin: United States
- Original language: English
- No. of seasons: 3
- No. of episodes: 30

Production
- Executive producers: James Griffiths; Jordan Shipley; Justin Shipley; Moses Port
- Producers: Jesse Hara; Ken Topolsky
- Production locations: Puerto Rico (season 1); Fiji (seasons 2–3)
- Camera setup: Single-camera
- Production companies: Shipley & Shipley Productions; TBS Productions (season 1); Studio T (seasons 2–3)

Original release
- Network: TBS
- Release: June 14, 2016 – October 2, 2018

Wrecked is an American sitcom that was created by Jordan Shipley and Justin Shipley for TBS. The series is about a group of people stranded on an island, after their airplane crashed in the ocean and is a parody of Lost. The 10-episode first season premiered on June 14, 2016.

On July 6, 2016, TBS renewed the show for a second season which was shot in Fiji. The second season premiered on June 20, 2017. On September 13, 2017, TBS renewed the series for a third season, which premiered on August 7, 2018. On April 26, 2019, it was reported that the series had been canceled by TBS after three seasons.

== Cast ==
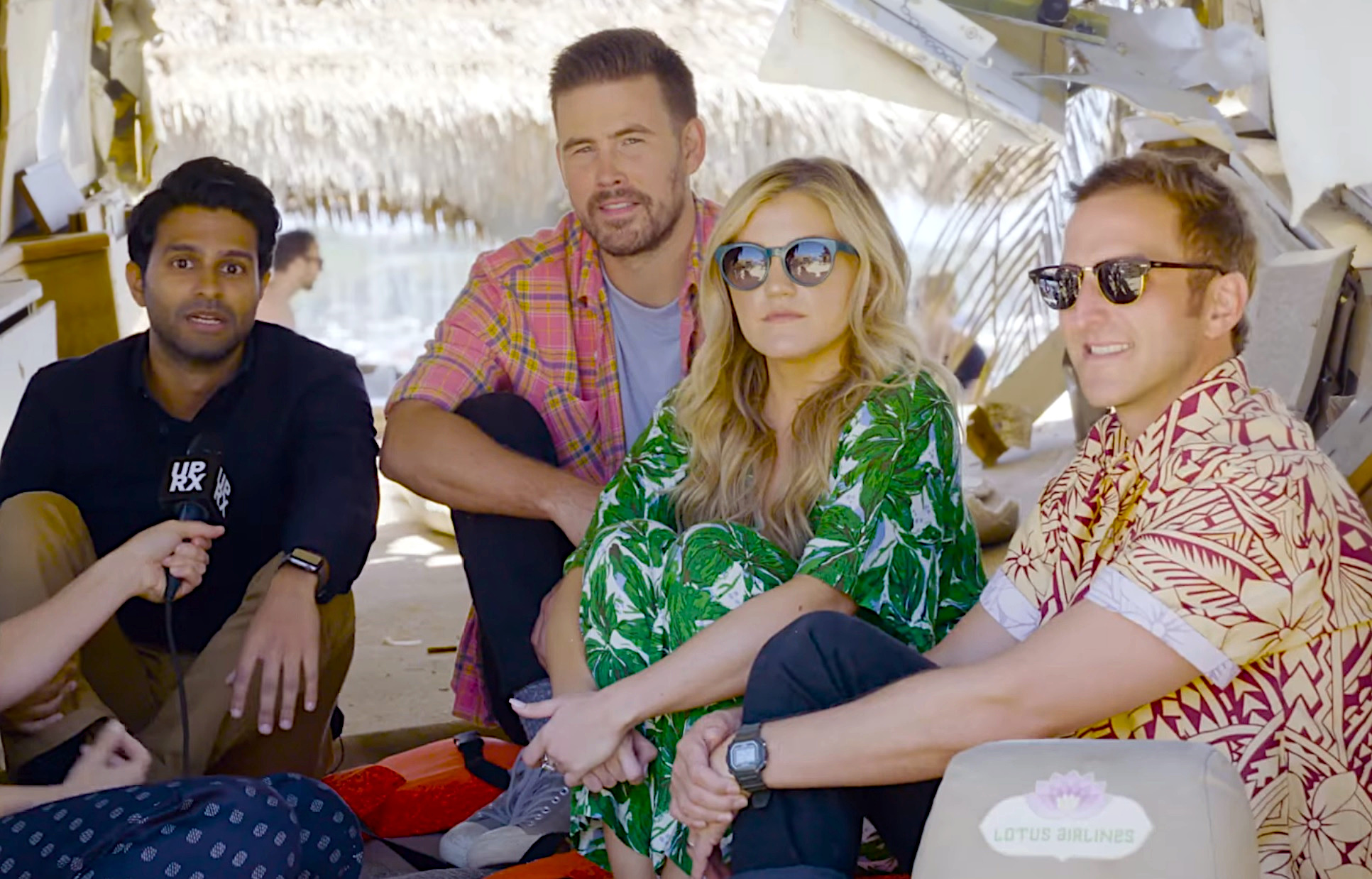
Left to right: Asif Ali, Zach Cregger, Jessica Lowe, Will Greenberg, interviewed by Uproxx in 2017

- Zach Cregger as Owen O'Connor, a flight attendant
- Asif Ali as Pack Hara, a sports agent
- Brian Sacca as Daniel "Danny" Wallace, the son of a rich businessman
- Rhys Darby as Steve Rutherford, a New Zealander from Papakura
- Brooke Dillman as Karen Cushman/Sister Mercy, a statistical analysis executive for Bing
- Ginger Gonzaga as Emma Cook, a podiatrist (season 1, guest Season 2-3)
- Jessica Lowe as Florence Bitterman, Emma's best friend, a pretentious feminist
- Will Greenberg as Todd Hinkle, an obnoxious guy who cares more about his golf clubs than his girlfriend
- Ally Maki as Jess Kato, Todd's girlfriend, then fiancée and later, wife
- James Scott as Liam, a British soldier (pilot only)

=== Recurring ===
- Pablo Azar as Pablo (season 1)
- George Basil as Chet Smart
- Lela Elam as Diane from Toledo (season 1-2)
- Todd Allen Durkin as Kurt Turdhole (season 1, guest Season 2)
- Brendan Jennings as Jerry, a deceased castaway with whom Pack has conversations during his hallucinations (season 1)
- Mike Benitez as Roger (season 1)
- Will McLaughlin as Bruce Island
- Ruben Rabasa as Yolonzo (season 1)
- Rory Scovel as Corey (season 2, guest Season 1)
- Eliza Coupe as Rosa, Owen's co-worker (season 1)
- Erinn Hayes as Rosa, Owen's co-worker (season 2)
- Ebonée Noel as The Barracuda (season 2)
- Ravi Patel as Tank Top (season 2, guest 1)
- Lucas Hazlett as Bandana (season 2, guest 1)
- Shaun Diston as V-Neck (season 2)
- Patrick Cox as Flannel (season 2)
- Jemaine Clement as Luther (season 2)
- Dink O'Neal as Richard "Dick" Wallace, Danny's father (season 1, guest Season 2)
- Jonno Roberts as Declan Stanwick (season 3)
- Rachel House as Martha Stanwick (season 3)
- Robert Baker as Brewster (season 3)
- Will Hines as Greg Peabody (season 3)
- Eugene Cordero as Errol (season 3)
- Karan Soni as Keith (season 3)

=== Guest starring ===
- Darin Toonder as Owen's father
- Luke Nappe as Young Owen
- Gary Anthony Williams as Gary, Jerry's deceased friend
- Josh Lawson as Eric, Steve's boss
- Elke Berry as Carol, Steve's ex-wife
- Jamie Denbo as Greta Liebowitz, Pack's boss
- Chris Bosh as himself
- Marc Evan Jackson as Father Daddy
- Sara Paxton as Sister Grace
- Britt Lower as Margot Wallace, Danny's sister
- Rob Corddry as himself

== Development ==
TBS ordered the production of the pilot episode written by Jordan Shipley and Justin Shipley in October 2014. The show follows a group of people after they survived a plane crash on a deserted island. The pilot was filmed in Puerto Rico and was picked up to series with a 10-episode order in May 2015.

== Episodes ==
Season	Episodes	Originally released	
Season	Episodes	First released	Last released
1	10	June 14, 2016	August 2, 2016
2	10	June 20, 2017	August 22, 2017
3	10	August 7, 2018	October 2, 2018

=== Season 1 (2016) ===
No. overall	No. in season	Title	Directed by	Written by	Original release date	Prod. code	U.S. viewers (millions)
1	1	"All Is Not Lost"	James Griffiths	Jordan Shipley & Justin Shipley	June 14, 2016	101	1.64
A striking British special forces agent leads a daring rescue after a commercial flight crash-lands on an uninhabited island.
2	2	"Rest in Peace, Callaway Hinkle"	James Griffiths	Jordan Shipley & Justin Shipley	June 14, 2016	102	1.21
The survivors find a satellite phone. Danny confronts his past. Steve comforts Todd after learning about the death of his child.
3	3	"Always Meant to See That"	Stuart McDonald	Chris Kula	June 21, 2016	103	1.37
Todd, Danny, and Owen investigate the other islanders after unearthing a troubling suitcase. Pack, Emma, and Florence are faced with the ultimate choice.
4	4	"The Community Pile"	Stuart McDonald	Ben Dougan	June 28, 2016	104	1.22
Chet takes Pack on a vision quest. Danny helps Owen relax. Todd makes a play to control the island.
5	5	"Tubthumping"	Jeff Tomsic	Chris Kula	July 5, 2016	105	1.38
The island holds an election for leader. Candidates are Emma, Florence, and Steve. Eventually Steve wins. Todd gets incarcerated into "The Pit."
6	6	"The Phantom"	Stuart McDonald	Carol Kolb	July 12, 2016	106	1.15
Steve and Owen argue over the best use of island supplies. Danny tries to remember an actor's name. Pack faces a difficult decision.
7	7	"The Trial"	Ryan Case	Rosa Handelman	July 19, 2016	107	1.24
The island holds a trial after a serious accident.
8	8	"The Adventures of Beth and Lamar"	Stuart McDonald	Clay Lapari & Erin Mitchell	July 26, 2016	108	1.22
Owen and Danny search for food. Florence tries desperately to get a sick Emma medical help. Steve's origins are revealed.
9	9	"Javier and the Gang"	Todd Biermann	Jordan Shipley & Justin Shipley	August 2, 2016	109	1.17
Owen has an encounter in the jungle. Florence and Todd try to survive off the island.
10	10	"Cop Tricks"	Todd Biermann	Jordan Shipley & Justin Shipley	August 2, 2016	110	0.92
Owen and Steve face off for control of the island.

=== Season 2 (2017) ===
No. overall	No. in season	Title	Directed by	Written by	Original release date	Prod. code	U.S. viewers (millions)
11	1	"Ransom"	Ian Fitzgibbon	The Shipley Brothers	June 20, 2017	201	1.21
Pirates arrive on the island to ransom Danny back to his millionaire father, but things don't go as planned for anyone.
12	2	"Poison"	Ian Fitzgibbon	Anthony King	June 20, 2017	202	0.86
As the pirates take over the island, Pack tries to negotiate a deal for the group's continued survival. Steve tries to make an alliance with Danny.
13	3	"Caiman"	Maurice Marable	Shaun Diston	June 27, 2017	203	1.02
Florence and Karen must trek into the jungle to find what is tainting their water. The castaways debate whether they want the pirates to spoil "Game of Thrones." Steve begins an unlikely romance.
14	4	"Tony Pepperoni"	Sarah Adina Smith	Chris Kula	July 11, 2017	204	0.87
Owen and Florence deal with the return of a deadly foe. Todd makes a haunting discovery about his past after trying to fist fight Chet.
15	5	"No One Rides for Free"	Maurice Marable	Celeste Ballard	July 18, 2017	205	0.94
Jess and Todd try to buy passage on the pirate's ship through unconventional means. Owen starts to have feelings for Florence as Steve grapples with his new love.
16	6	"Sister Mercy"	Sarah Adina Smith	Anthony King	July 25, 2017	206	0.98
After discovering the pirate's plan to harvest their organs, the survivors try to escape the island. Karen makes a difficult decision that echoes a moment from her past.
17	7	"Cruise-ifornication"	Emile Levisetti	Chris Kula	August 1, 2017	207	1.08
After making it onto the pirate's ship (a Red Hot Chili Peppers tribute band cruise), the survivors divide after only some of them are able to get showers before the water runs out. Pack and Bruce form an unlikely friendship.
18	8	"Speed"	Jim Field Smith	Lauren McGuire	August 8, 2017	208	1.00
After Todd and Jess decide to get married, Florence and Owen struggle to define their new romance. Corey returns to officiate the wedding. Pack and Steve make a discovery that threatens to tear them apart.
19	9	"The Setup"	Jim Field Smith	The Shipley Brothers	August 15, 2017	209	1.01
Danny launches an investigation after the survivors discover someone has sabotaged the ship by blowing the engine. Steve makes a shocking discovery at the bottom of the ship.
20	10	"Nerd Speak"	James Griffiths	The Shipley Brothers	August 22, 2017	210	1.08
As the ship sinks, the survivors try to escape. Meanwhile Danny, Owen, and Florence must confront Corey for the sabotage.

=== Season 3 (2018) ===
No. overall	No. in season	Title	Directed by	Written by	Original release date	Prod. code	U.S. viewers (millions)
21	1	"Bush Man"	Jim Field Smith	The Shipley Brothers	August 7, 2018	301	0.87
After surviving the Cruisifornication explosion and washing ashore on a new island, the survivors uncover a menacing threat.
22	2	"Puke & Cigars"	Jim Field Smith	Chris Kula	August 14, 2018	302	0.98
After a charismatic millionaire rescues the survivors, Jess and Florence suspect he may not be what he seems, and set out to answer the question -- who is Declan Stanwick?
23	3	"Six Feet"	Justin Shipley	The Shipley Brothers and Chris Kula	August 21, 2018	303	0.98
After discovering Declan's sinister plot, Danny goes undercover with the rich, while Pack and Karen attempt to escape the compound.
24	4	"A Game of Chest"	Jordan Shipley	Lauren McGuire	August 28, 2018	304	0.86
After Jess loses her recollection of the last decade, Todd attempts to spark her memory. Steve and Declan face off in a battle of wits.
25	5	"Last Meal"	Amy York Rubin	Shaun Diston	September 4, 2018	305	0.90
On the eve of "The Hunt," Martha offers to the survivors' one last meal of their choosing; as long as they can all decide together.
26	6	"Hunt Day"	Alethea Jones	Lyle Friedman	September 11, 2018	306	0.89
Hunt Day arrives and the survivors must face off against each other in a battle royale to the death.
27	7	"Ballers"	Alethea Jones	Celeste Ballard	September 18, 2018	307	0.91
Attempting to hide from the others during The Hunt, Pack and Jess run into a new threat on the island.
28	8	"The Dark Prince Returns"	Jim Field Smith	Charlie Fay and Isaac Jay	September 25, 2018	308	0.79
With Karen gravely injured, Owen and Danny must journey to the center of the island to defeat Chettywompwomp; Florence learns more about Karen's back story; Pack, Todd, and Jess face a futile task.
29	9	"Mrs. Stanwick"	Jim Field Smith	Chris Kula	October 2, 2018	309	0.73
The survivors attempt to turn the tables on the rich and lure them into a trap.
30	10	"The Island Family"	James Griffiths	The Shipley Brothers	October 2, 2018	310	0.55
Barricaded in the mansion and surrounded by the rich, the survivors mount one last attempt to escape Declan's island.

== Reception ==
Wrecked has received mixed reviews. On Metacritic, the show holds a score of 56%, indicating "mixed or average reviews".
