= Ally Maki =

American actress (born 1986)

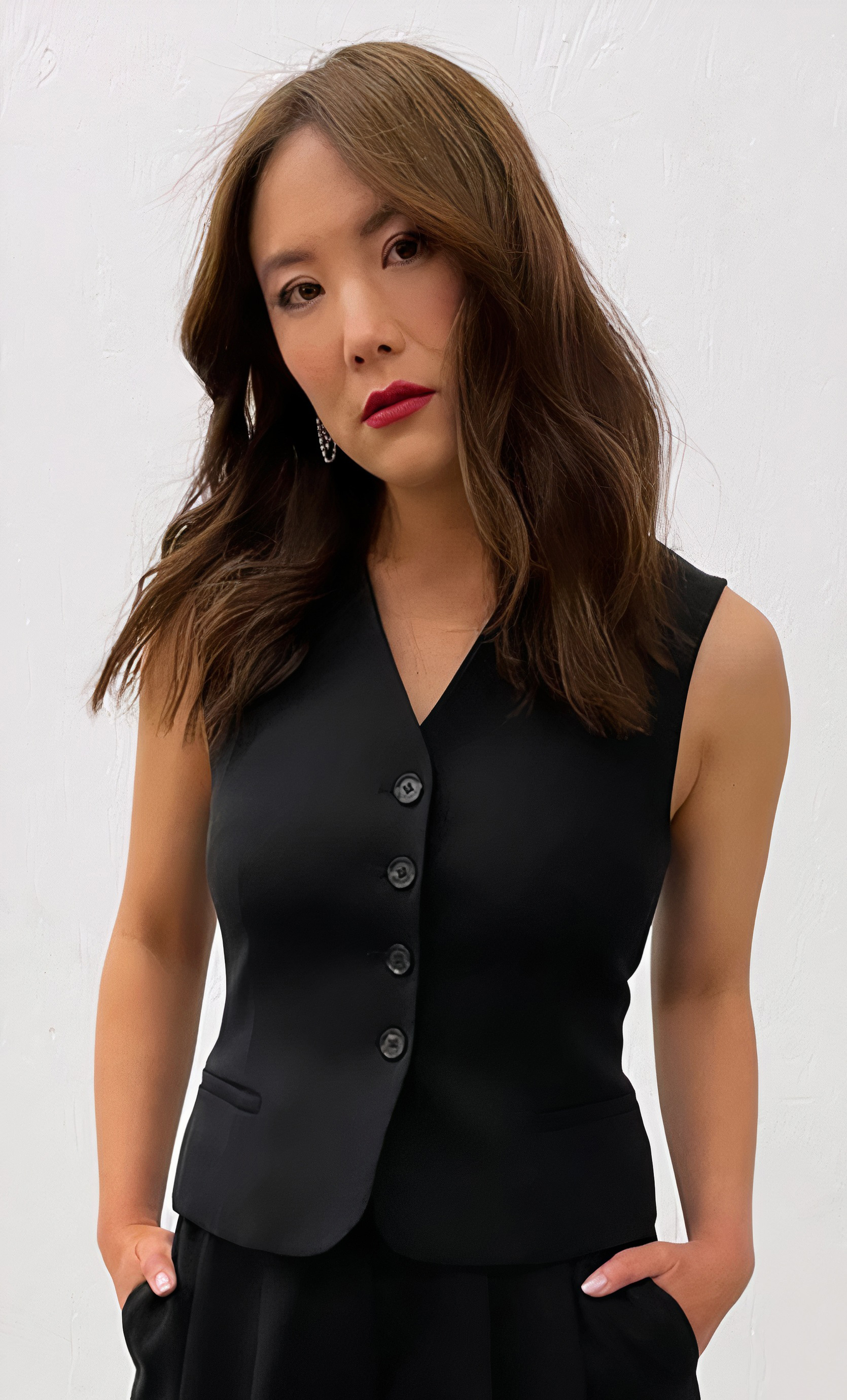
- Maki in 2021
- Born: Ally Maki Matsumura; December 29, 1986 (age 39); Kirkland, Washington, U.S.
- Other name: Ally Matsumura
- Occupations: Actress; model; singer
- Years active: 2002–present
- Children: 1
- Musical career
- Formerly of: The Valli Girls

Ally Maki Matsumura (born December 29, 1986), is an American actress and former musician. She portrayed Jess Kato in the TBS comedy series Wrecked and was the voice of Giggle McDimples in Disney's Toy Story 4 and Toy Story 5.

== Early life ==
Maki was born and raised in Kirkland, Washington. She has two older brothers.

Maki is a fourth-generation Japanese American, or Yonsei. Her grandmother was held in the Japanese internment camp at Heart Mountain Relocation Center, Wyoming during World War II. Her grandfather was a part of the 442nd Infantry Regiment, a unit consisting of primarily Japanese American soldiers. One of her great-grandparents was a sharecropper in Mountain View, California.

== Career ==
Maki was scouted at 14 by a talent agent in Seattle. In 2001, she moved to a communal home for artists in Santa Clarita, California. From there, she was recruited by Columbia Records to form the girl band The Valli Girls, for whom she played the keytar. As part of her training, she took DJ lessons at Freakbeat Records.

Maki performed in the television film iCarly: iGo to Japan (2008) as well as many cameo appearances in films and television series such as Step Up 3D (2010) and The Big Bang Theory (2010). She had supporting roles in the comedy-drama films The Family Tree (2011) and Geography Club (2013).

From 2009 to 2010, Maki had a recurring role as Dawn in the comedy-drama series 10 Things I Hate About You. She made a guest appearance in a season 4 episode of the TV series Bones as Dr. Tanaka, a forensic specialist from Japan. Maki was in the final considerations to play the role of Alice in the 2012 drama film The Perks of Being a Wallflower, which eventually went to Erin Wilhelmi.

Between 2016 and 2018, she starred as Jess Kato in the TBS comedy series Wrecked. From 2018 to 2019, she had a recurring supporting role in Marvel's Cloak & Dagger on Freeform.

In 2018, Maki founded the Asian American Girl Club, a lifestyle and apparel brand.

== Personal life ==
In April 2024, Maki revealed she was expecting her first child with fiancé Travis Atreo. In 2024, she gave birth to a daughter.

== Filmography ==
=== Film ===
Year	Title	Role	Notes
2003	80's Ending	Japanese Girl	Short film
2003	Rogues	Choir	
2010	Step Up 3D	Jenny	
2010	The Prankster	Kassandra Yamaguchi	
2011	Recess Court	Cassie	Short film
2011	The Family Tree	Shauna	
2012	Beach Bar	Ireene Saki Zbeitnefski and Merbaby	
2012	Music High	Ally	
2013	Geography Club	Min	
2013	Amelia's 25th	Ally	
2019	5 Years Apart	Olivia	
2019	Toy Story 4	Giggle McDimples (voice)	
2020	Lamp Life	Giggle McDimples (voice)	Short film
2021	Home Sweet Home Alone	Mei	
2022	Dealing With Dad	Margaret	
2022	Doula	Katherine	
2023	Shortcomings	Miko	
2023	Seagrass	Judith	
2026	Toy Story 5	Giggle McDimples (voice)	

=== Television ===
Year	Title	Role	Notes
2002	My Wife and Kids	Sasha	Episode: "Samba Story"
2003	ER	Missy	Episode: "No Strings Attached"
2003	That's So Raven	Student #2	Episode: "Campaign in the Neck"
2003	Buffy the Vampire Slayer	Japanese girl	Episode: "Chosen"
2007	Subs	Alexa Tanaka	Unsold FX pilot
2008	Terminator: The Sarah Connor Chronicles	Student	Episode: "Queen's Gambit"
2008	Miss Guided	Michelle	Episode: "High School Musical"
2008	Privileged	Breckyn	Recurring role; 4 episodes
2008	iCarly: iGo to Japan	Kyoko	Television film
2009	Bones	Dr. Haru Tanaka	Episode: "The Girl in the Mask"
2009	Greek	Hot Renaissance fair girl	Episode: "See You Next Time, Sisters!"
2009–2010	10 Things I Hate About You	Dawn	Recurring role; 16 episodes
2010	The Big Bang Theory	Joyce Kim	Episode: "The Staircase Implementation"
2011	Workaholics	Brenanda	Episode: "We Be Ballin'"
2011	Franklin & Bash	Tonia	Guest role; 2 episodes
2012	Shake It Up	Keiko Ishizuka	Episode: "Made in Japan"
2012	Hot in Cleveland	Brooke	Episode: "Method Man"
2013	2 Broke Girls	June	Episode: "And the Girlfriend Experience"
2015	NCIS	Marie Manna	Episode: "Lockdown"
2016	New Girl	Kumiko	Episode: "No Girl"
2016–2018	Wrecked	Jess	Main role; 30 episodes
2017–2019	Dear White People	Ikumi	Recurring role; 5 episodes
2018–2019	Marvel's Cloak & Dagger	Mina Hess	Recurring role; 8 episodes
2018, 2022	Robot Chicken	Wanda Li (voice)	2 episodes
2020	Into the Dark	Allison	Episode: "My Valentine"
2020–2023	The Owl House	Viney (voice)	Recurring role; 5 episodes
2021–2024	Hit-Monkey	Haruka (voice)	Main role; 9 episodes
2022-2026	Beavis and Butt-Head	Various (voice)	15 episodes
2023-2024	The Big Door Prize	Hana	Main role; 16 episodes
2024	Exploding Kittens	Greta Higgins	Main role; 9 episodes
2024	Universal Basic Guys	Andrea (voice)	Main role
2024	Dream Productions	Janelle Johnson (voice)	Recurring role; 4 episodes

=== Web series ===
Year	Title	Role	Notes
2010	Crazy/Sexy/Awkward	Rosemary	Episode: "The Wingwoman"
2012	Company Car	Ally	Episode: "He Said She Said"

=== Video games ===
Year	Title	Role	Notes
2020	Beyond Blue	Ren	
2022	We Are OFK	Itsumi Saito, Anime Hero, Virtual Streamer	
