= Julie Doucet =

Canadian comic artist and writer (born 1965)

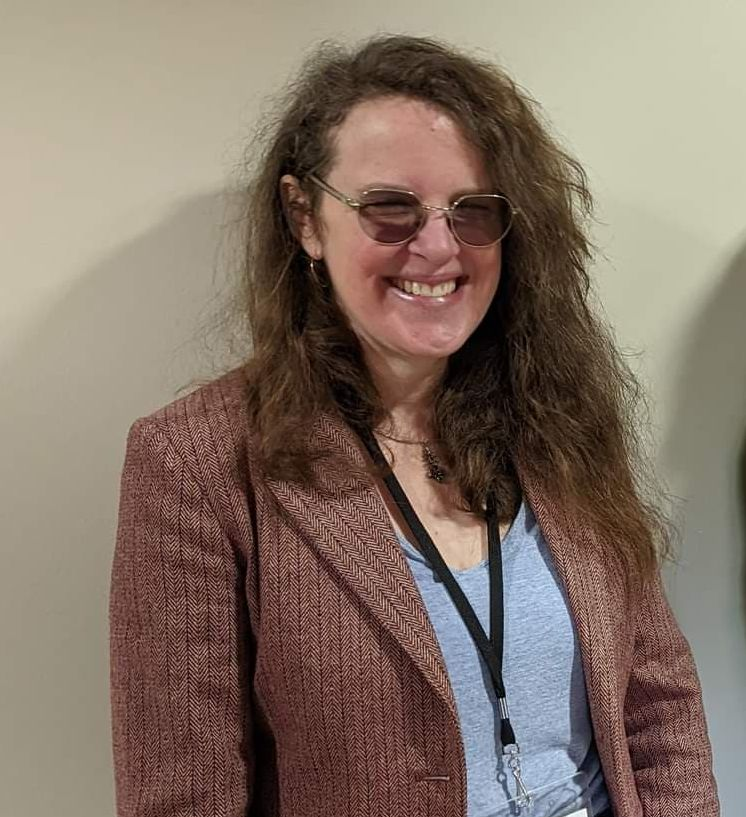
- Born: December 31, 1965 (age 60) Montreal, Quebec, Canada
- Areas: Cartoonist, Artist
- Notable works: Dirty Plotte; My New York Diary
- Awards: Harvey Award for "Best New Talent" (1991); Grand Prix de la ville d'Angoulême (2022)

Julie Doucet (born December 31, 1965) is a Canadian underground cartoonist and artist, best known for her autobiographical works such as Dirty Plotte and My New York Diary. Her work is concerned with such topics as "sex, violence, menstruation and male/female issues."

== Biography ==
=== Early career ===
Doucet was born in Montreal, Quebec. She was educated at an all-girls Catholic school, studied fine arts at Cégep du Vieux Montréal (a junior college), then attended Université du Québec à Montréal. Her university degree was in printing arts. She began cartooning in 1987. She was published in small-press comics and self-published her own comic called Dirty Plotte. She used the photocopied zine to record "her day to day life, her dreams, angsts, [and] fantasies."

=== Comics works ===
After Doucet's sixth issue of Dirty Plotte, she was noticed by fellow cartoonist/editor Aline Kominsky-Crumb. Kominsky-Crumb was influential in the underground feminist comics scene, participated in early issues of the underground anthology Wimmen's Comix, and at that point was the editor of the anthology comic series Weirdo (started by her husband, Robert Crumb). Kominsky-Crumb asked to publish Doucet's story "E: Ni Manique," retitled "Heavy Flow," in the fall 1989 issue of Weirdo. Kominsky-Crumb then introduced Doucet to Wimmin's Comix, and Doucet published three comic stories in the 15th issue in 1989: "You know, I'm a very shy girl", "Tampax Again", " and "The First Time I Shaved my Legs...," It was at this point that Doucet began to attract critical attention.

Doucet began being published by Drawn & Quarterly in January 1991 in a regular-sized comic series also named Dirty Plotte. Shortly thereafter, she moved to New York City. Although she moved to Seattle the following year, her experiences in New York formed the basis of the critically acclaimed My New York Diary (many stories of which were taken from Dirty Plotte). She moved from Seattle to Berlin in 1995, before finally returning to Montreal in 1998. While in Berlin, she had a book named Ciboire de criss published by L'Association in Paris, her first book in French. Once back in Montreal, she released the twelfth and final issue of Dirty Plotte before beginning a brief hiatus from comics.

She returned to the field in 2000 with The Madame Paul Affair, a slice-of-life look at contemporary Montreal which was originally serialized in Ici-Montreal, a local alternative weekly. At the same time, she was branching out into more experimental territory, culminating with the 2001 release of Long Time Relationship, a collection of prints and engravings. In 2004, Doucet also published in French an illustrated diary (Journal) chronicling a year of her life and, in 2006, an autobiography made from a collage of words cut from magazines and newspapers (J comme Je). In spring of 2006 she had her first solo print show, named en souvenir du Melek, at the galerie B-312 in Montreal. In December 2007, Drawn and Quarterly published 365 Days: A Diary by Julie Doucet, in which she chronicled her life for a year, starting in late 2002.

=== Post-comics works ===
Doucet remained prominent in the Montreal arts community, but in an interview in the June 22, 2006, edition of the Montreal Mirror, she declared that she had retired from long-form comics.

She also said "...it's quite a lot of work, and not that much money. I went to a newspaper to propose a comic strip because I only had to draw a small page and it would be out the next week. For once it was regular pay and good money."

I quit comics because I got completely sick of it. I was drawing comics all the time and didn't have the time or energy to do anything else. That got to me in the end. I never made enough money from comics to be able to take a break and do something else. Now I just can't stand comics.

. . . I wish my work would be recognized by a larger crowd of people as more art than be stuck with the cartoonist label for the rest of my life. That's what's killing me about a lot of those comics guys. Dan Clowes is mostly a writer, a great artist, and has tried different things, But a lot of those guys, their drawing style never changes—the content neither—and it seems it never will. I just don't understand that, how you can spend fifty years of your artist life doing the same thing over and over again.

She had a book of poetry published by L'Oie de Cravan in 2006, À l’école de l’amour. Her post-comics artwork consists of linocuts, collage, and papier-mâché sculptures. In 2007, Doucet designed the cover for the Penguin Classics Deluxe Edition of Louisa May Alcott's Little Women.

=== Return to comics ===
In April 2022, Doucet returned to making comics with Time Zone J, published by Drawn and Quarterly. As she said about making the new comic:

"I tried to tell it in cutout words, I tried to set it in the past — it happened in the '80s, but I tried to set it in the 1800s — I tried to type it on a typing machine, I tried to make a movie. . . . But nothing really worked."

Time Zone J is notable for its unusual format, which is designed to be read from the bottom of each page to the top.

== Awards and honours ==
In 1991, Dirty Plotte was nominated for best new series and Doucet won the Harvey Award for "Best New Talent". In 1999, when The Comics Journal made a list of the top 100 comics of all time, she was on several of the short-lists and Dirty Plotte ranked 96th. In 2000, her book My New York Diary won the Firecracker Award for best graphic novel. Doucet's book 365 Days: A Diary was nominated for best book award at the 2009 Doug Wright Awards. In 2019, Doucet's Dirty Plotte collection was nominated for the SPX Ignatz award for outstanding collection.

In April 2021, she was awarded the Prix Albert-Chartier, during the Festival Québec BD, for her contribution to comics in Quebec.

In March 2022, she was awarded the Grand Prix de la ville d'Angoulême as a lifetime achievement. She is only the third woman to win the award.

In November 2025, Canada Post released a stamp honouring her as part of a series focusing on Canadian graphic novelists, and featuring an original drawing by her.

== Bibliography ==
- Dirty Plotte (minicomic) (12 issues, 1988-1989
- Dirty Plotte (12 issues, Drawn and Quarterly, Jan. 1991–Aug. 1998)
- Lift Your Leg, My Fish is Dead! (Drawn and Quarterly, 1993) ISBN 978-0969670131
- My Most Secret Desire (Drawn and Quarterly, 1995) ISBN 9781896597027
- My New York Diary (Drawn and Quarterly, May 1999) ISBN 978-1896597225
- The Madame Paul Affair (Drawn and Quarterly, 2000) ISBN 978-1896597348 — also published in French (L'Association) and Spanish (Inrevés Edicions)
- Long Time Relationship (Drawn and Quarterly, 2001) ISBN 978-1896597478
- (with Benoît Chaput) Melek (2002)
- Ciboire de criss L'Association, 2004) ISBN 978-2909020631
- Journal (L'Association, 2004) ISBN 978-2844141514
- J comme Je: Essais d'autobiographie (Seuil French, 2006) ISBN 978-2020639361
- Elle Humour (Gingko Press, 2006) ISBN 978-1584232469
- Je suis un K (2006)
- 365 Days: A Diary by Julie Doucet (Drawn and Quarterly, 2007) ISBN 978-1897299159
- À l'école de l'amour (L'Oie de Cravan, 2007) ISBN 978-2922399462
- (with Michel Gondry) My New New York Diary (PictureBox, 2010) ISBN 978-0984589203
- Carpet Sweeper Tales (Drawn and Quarterly, 2016) ISBN 9781770462397
- Dirty Plotte: The Complete Julie Doucet (Drawn and Quarterly, 2018) ISBN 978-1770463233
- Time Zone J (Drawn and Quarterly, 2022) ISBN 978-1770464988
- Suicide Total (L'Association, 2022) ISBN 978-2844149428

== In popular culture ==
Doucet's name appears in the lyrics of the Le Tigre song "Hot Topic."

== See also ==
- List of feminist comic books
- Portrayal of women in comics
