= Optic Nerve (comics) =

Comic book by Adrian Tomine

Publication information
- Publisher: Drawn & Quarterly
- Schedule: irregular
- Format: Ongoing series
- Genre: Alternative comics
- Publication date: 1991
- No. of issues: 14 (as of 2019)

Creative team
- Created by: Adrian Tomine

Optic Nerve is a comic book series by cartoonist Adrian Tomine. Originally self-published by Tomine in 1991 as a series of mini-comics (which have later been collected in a single volume, 32 Stories), the series has been published by Drawn & Quarterly since 1995.

Tomine's style and subject matter are restrained and realistic. Many are set in Northern California. Many of his stories for Optic Nerve feature Asian American characters, including "Hawaiian Getaway", "Six-Day Cold", "Layover", and "Shortcomings". Adrian Tomine is Asian American and lives in Brooklyn, New York. Many topics of his stories are at least partly autobiographical.

In the initial self-published issues, as well as the first eight Drawn & Quarterly issues (1995–2001), Optic Nerve was typically a collection of short stories. After an extended hiatus, Tomine resumed the comic in late 2004 and began his first multi-issue storyline, "Shortcomings," with #9.

== Synopsis ==
Issue One contains five stories entitled "Sleepwalk," "Echo Ave.," "Long Distance," "Drop" and "Lunch Break," and was published by Drawn & Quarterly in April 1995. Issue Two contains four stories entitled "The Connecting Thread," "Summer Job," "Pink Frosting" and "Layover," and was published by Drawn & Quarterly in November 1995.

"The Connecting Thread" is a story of a young woman convinced that she is being watched from afar by a mysterious admirer who repeatedly places advertisements about her in the "I Saw You" section of her local newspaper.

"Summer Job" tells the experiences of an adolescent named Eric who is employed at a photocopying store for a summer.

"Pink Frosting" depicts a violent confrontation that takes place after a car accident almost occurs, culminating in a curb-stomp.

"Layover" shows a young man who misses his flight, and rather than returning home to people who assume he has caught his flight, he wanders aimlessly for the whole day.

Issue Three contains four stories entitled "Dylan & Donovan," "Supermarket," "Hostage Situation" and "Unfaded," and was published by Drawn & Quarterly in August 1996. Issue Four contains three stories entitled "Six Day Cold," "Fourth of July" and "Hazel Eyes," and was published by Drawn & Quarterly in April 1997. Summer Blonde is one of Adrian Tomine's most commercially popular collections of comics from his Optic Nerve series. These four stories were originally published individually.

Summer Blonde begins with "Alter Ego", originally published in Optic Nerve #5, which chronicles a promising young author struggling to write a sophomore novel. In the wake of his writer's block, he becomes obsessed with re-connecting with his high school crush, despite currently being in a relationship. His feelings are further complicated when he begins spending time with his crush's teenage sister.

"Hawaiian Getaway", originally published in Optic Nerve #6, is the story of Hilary Chan's evolving circumstances when she finds herself unemployed and with no meaningful social relationships. In order to compensate for these voids, she becomes more eccentric and isolated. The format of the story is unlike the others included in Summer Blonde, as it divided into 13 chapters that separate defining moments in Hilary's life. This format also succeeds in illustrating the protagonist's disconnection from society.

"Summer Blonde", the title story, was first seen in Optic Nerve #7, and is centered on a beautiful young woman named Vanessa who finds herself the object of three men's desires: her boyfriend, a misogynistic lover named Carlo, and Carlo's obsessive and unstable neighbor, Neil.

"Bomb Scare", originally published in Optic Nerve #8, tells the story of two outcast teenagers and the scrutiny that they must endure at the hand of their high school's social hierarchy. "Bomb Scare" was chosen by Dave Eggers to be included in the book "The Best American Non-Required Reading 2002" (Houghton Mifflin).

Issues Nine through Eleven contain Optic Nerve's first multiple-issue story arc. Issue Nine was published by Drawn & Quarterly in January 2004; Issue Ten in October 2005; Issue Eleven in March 2007. These issues are about Ben and his relationship with his girlfriend, Miko. After much fighting, Miko decides to move from California to New York for an internship. Ben follows her to New York, only to find that she is not interning, but dating someone else. Ben's best friend, Alice, is his voice of reason, and initially moves out to New York as well, enjoying it more that California. The story has underlying themes of sexuality, both homosexual and heterosexual relations, and race relations.

The story was compiled as into a single hardcover edition, titled Shortcomings, by Drawn & Quarterly in September 2007. A second hardcover edition was published in December 2007, and paperback in April 2009.

Issue Twelve contains two stories. The first, entitled "A Brief History of the Art Form Known as "Hortisculpture"", is composed of several vignettes. The second story is titled "Amber Sweet." Optic Nerve #12 is the first issue to include interior color, and was published by Drawn & Quarterly in September 2011.

Issue Thirteen contains three stories, "Go Owls", "Translated, From The Japanese" and "Winter 2012", and was published by Drawn & Quarterly in July 2013.

Issue Fourteen, published by Drawn & Quarterly in May 2015, contains the stories "Killing and Dying" and "Intruders".

The stories in issues #12–14 were also published as a separate book titled "Killing and Dying".

== Collected editions ==
- 32 Stories: The Complete Optic Nerve Mini-Comics (1995, collects original mini-comics, ISBN 1-896597-00-9)
- Sleepwalk and Other Stories (1998, collects Optic Nerve #1–4, ISBN 1-896597-12-2)
- Summer Blonde (2002, collects Optic Nerve #5–8, SC: ISBN 1-896597-57-2, HC: ISBN 1-896597-49-1)
- Shortcomings (2007, collects Optic Nerve #9–11, HC: ISBN 1-897299-16-8)
- Killing and Dying (2015, collects Optic Nerve #12–14, HC: ISBN 1-770462-09-0)
