= Shortcomings (comics) =

Graphic novel by Adrian Tomine

- Creator: Adrian Tomine
- Date: 2007
- Page count: 108 pages
- Publisher: Drawn & Quarterly

Original publication
- Published in: Optic Nerve
- Issues: 9–11
- Date of publication: January 2004 – March 2007
- Language: English
- ISBN: 9781897299166 (hardcover)

Chronology
- Preceded by: New York Sketches 2004
- Followed by: Scenes From an Impending Marriage

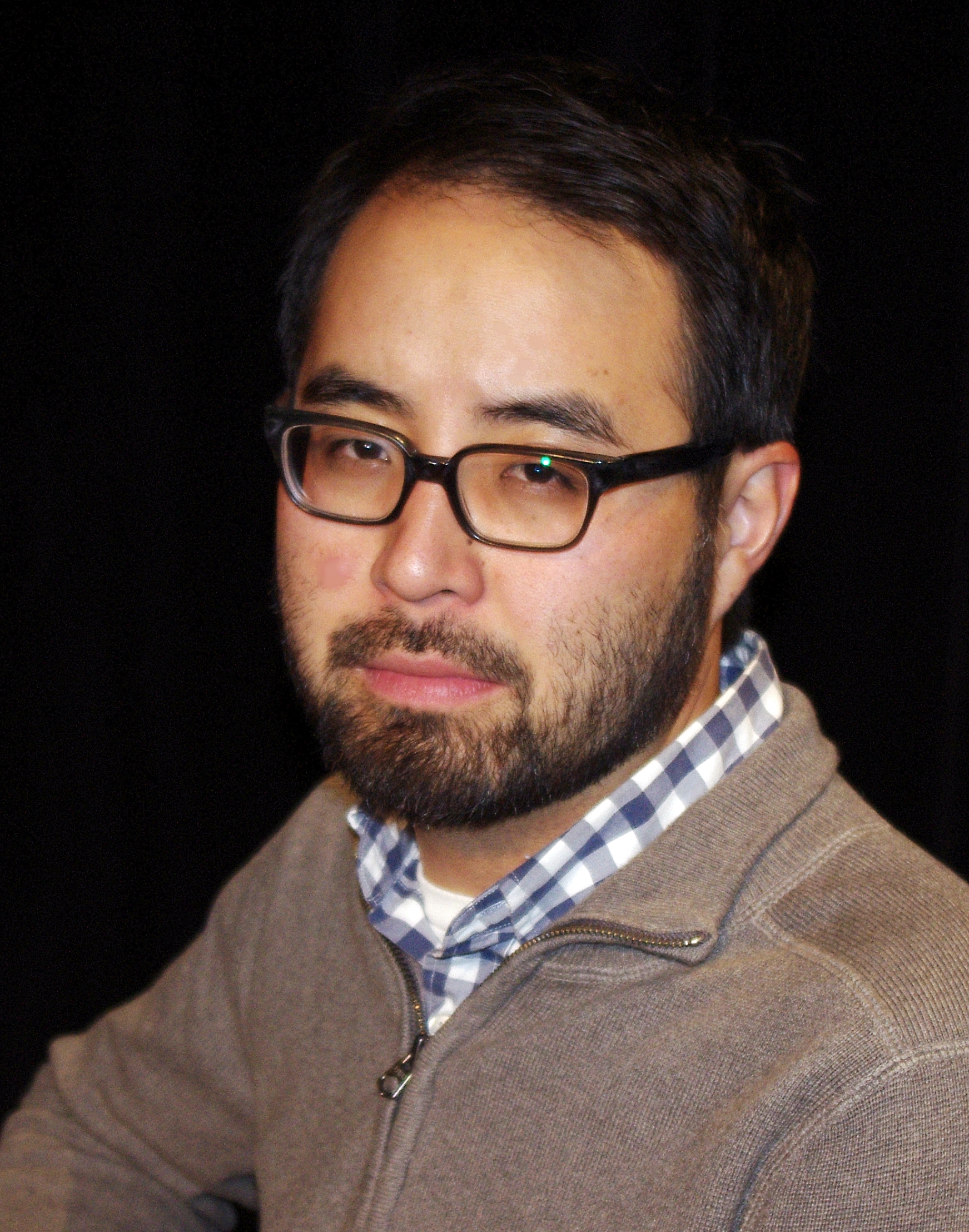
Adrian Tomine at the 2011 Brooklyn Book Festival

Shortcomings is a graphic novel by cartoonist Adrian Tomine. Shortcomings was originally serialized in issues #9 through #11 of Tomine's comic book series Optic Nerve before being released as a whole in 2007. It was also excerpted in Timothy McSweeney's Quarterly Concern #13.

== Plot summary ==
Adrian Tomine's graphic novel Shortcomings is his only work that fully deals with themes of being a young Asian-American male in American society. Ben Tanaka, the story's protagonist, lives in Berkeley, California with his politically active girlfriend Miko Hayashi. Ben is uninterested in Miko's participation in the Asian-American cultural community, but he possesses a wandering eye—specifically for European women. When Miko begins to resent what she interprets as a rejection of both her Asian heritage and of herself, she moves to New York, at which point Ben disastrously attempts to pursue the type of woman he feels he really wants.

In Sandra Oh's essay "Sight Unseen: Adrian Tomine's Optic Nerve and the Politics of Recognition"., published by The Society for the Study of the Multi-Ethnic Literature of the United States (MELUS), Oh writes that Tomine, like his character Ben Tanaka, is more or less "pessimistic about the possibility of escaping the limitations of socially inscribed identities." Throughout the novel we see this pessimism manifest in Ben's general rejection and resentment of things that attempt to, in Ben's words, "make some big 'statement' about race." At the same time, Shortcomings does deal with racial issues, but it attempts to do so without resorting to clichés.

== Critical reception ==
In 2006, Entertainment Weekly published a short review of Tomine's work in their article."The Mix", which lists "What not to miss in Music, Books, Games, and more…". They wrote:

Optic Nerve comics prodigy Adrian Tomine has built a loyal following off the slice-of-life Nerve since '91. His latest arc (issues 9-11) follows moody movie-theater owner Ben Tanaka, who struggles to hang on to his Asian girlfriend while secretly lusting after white ladies. He's sad and somewhat despicable, and yet Tomine, being the understated virtuoso he is, effortlessly spins him into a Gen-X hero.

In 2007, Entertainment Weekly placed Shortcomings on their list of "Autumn’s most eagerly awaited new books." After its release, critic Ken Tucker gave Tomine's novel Shortcomings an "A" grade, calling it a "graphic narrative as piercingly realistic as any prose fiction."

In "World Literature Today", David Shook of the University of Oxford called Tomine's drawing in Shortcomings "characteristically clean and succinct" and praised the novel's success in asking questions "important enough to make raising them a notable effort in itself."

Shortcomings was also named to multiple Best of 2007 lists for both books in general and graphic novels, including those from Publishers Weekly, the New York Times, and Amazon.com.

Tomine has not completely escaped criticism, however. As Derek Parker Royal wrote in MELUS; "Tomine’s resistance to racialized identity in his works, for which some Asian-Americans have criticized him, is called into question by his recent efforts to confront Asian-American subject matters. As a result, one can read his semi-autobiographic comics as a chronicle of the limits and responsibilities of ethnic representation."

== Film adaptation ==
On March 31, 2021, a film based on the graphic novel was announced to be in development from Roadside Attractions with Randall Park making his feature directorial debut and producing alongside Michael Golamco and Hieu Ho's Imminent Collision. On August 30, 2022, Justin H. Min, Sherry Cola, Ally Maki, Debby Ryan, Tavi Gevinson, Sonoya Mizuno, Timothy Simons, and Jacob Batalon were confirmed to be playing roles in the film. The film premiered at the 2023 Sundance Film Festival in the U.S. Dramatic Competition.
