= Adrian Tomine =

American cartoonist

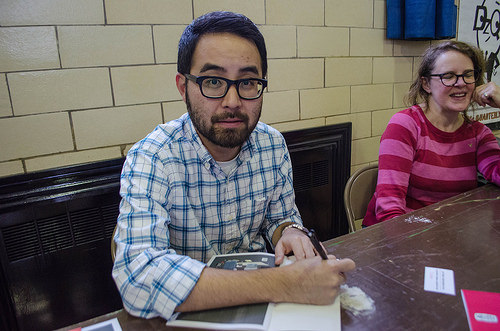
- Tomine at the 2014 Comic Arts Brooklyn
- Born: May 31, 1974 (age 52) Sacramento, California, U.S.
- Areas: Writer, Artist
- Notable works: Optic Nerve

Adrian Tomine (/toʊˈmiːnə/; born May 31, 1974) is an American cartoonist. He is best known for his ongoing comic book series Optic Nerve and his illustrations in The New Yorker.

== Early life ==
Adrian Tomine was born May 31, 1974, in Sacramento, California. His father is Dr. Chris Tomine, Ph.D. and Professor Emeritus of Environmental Engineering at California State University Sacramento's Department of Civil Engineering. His mother is Dr. Satsuki Ina, Ph.D. and Professor Emeritus at California State University Sacramento's School of Education. His grandmother was Shizuko Ina, who was pictured in Dorothea Lange's photo essay on the internment of Japanese-Americans during WWII. He also has a brother, Dylan, who is eight years his senior.

Tomine is fourth-generation Japanese American. Both of his parents, in spite of being third-generation Americans, spent part of their childhoods incarcerated in Japanese American internment camps during World War II.

Tomine's parents divorced when he was two years old, after which he moved frequently, accompanying his mother to Fresno, California, then Oregon, Germany, and Belgium, while spending summers with his father in Sacramento.

As a child, Tomine enjoyed reading Spider-Man comics, and was inspired to experiment with drawing and creating his own stories. In an interview, he said, "Something about the medium just transfixed me at an early age".

In high school, he began writing, drawing, and self-publishing Optic Nerve, which he has continued producing as a regular comic book series for Drawn & Quarterly. Tomine continued to produce the series while studying English as an undergraduate at UC Berkeley.

== Career ==
Tomine began self-publishing his work when he was a teenager, but was also featured in mainstream publications like Pulse! while still in high school.

In an interview published in The Comics Journal #205, Tomine addressed criticisms of his work and discussed his influences; the magazine cover featured his self-parody of sorts, a sequence in which a hipster girl says to the reader, "I'm so cute! I love coffee and indie rock! But... I'm sad. Can you relate?"

Tomine cites Jaime Hernandez (Love and Rockets) and Daniel Clowes (Ghost World) as two of his biggest influences. He is also a fan of his contemporary Chris Ware.

=== Optic Nerve ===
Optic Nerve is Tomine's ongoing comic series that was originally self-published in minicomic format and distributed to local comics shops in his area. Tomine published seven issues of the Optic Nerve mini; most of the stories were later compiled into a single edition, 32 Stories: The Complete Optic Nerve Mini-Comics, published by Drawn & Quarterly.

After Drawn & Quarterly became Tomine's publisher, Optic Nerve was published at standard comic book size, and the issue numbering was restarted, with the first Drawn & Quarterly-published issue renumbered as #1. These comics range from a few pages per story to the 32-page standard in later issues.

Issues #1–4 included several stories each and were later collected in Sleepwalk and Other Stories. Issues #5–8 included one story each and were collected in Summer Blonde.

Issues #9–11 were compiled into the critically praised 2007 graphic novel Shortcomings, a complete story arc in which Tomine explored Asian American racial issues directly. The novel was later adapted into a 2023 film directed and produced by Randall Park, from a screenplay written by Tomine.

=== Killing and Dying ===
In 2015, Tomine's graphic novel Killing and Dying, a collection of six short stories, was released to critical acclaim and became a New York Times Bestseller. It was named one of New York Magazine’s Top 10 Graphic Novels of the Year and one of NPR‘s Best Books of the Year, and was winner of The Story Prize’s Spotlight Award. Stories from the book were also honored with an Eisner Award for Best Short Story and excerpted in The Best American Comics anthology. Two stories from the collection, as well as one from Summer Blonde, were adapted into the 2021 French film Paris, 13th District.

In its review of Killing and Dying, Wired magazine called Tomine “one of the most gifted graphic novelists of our time.” English author Zadie Smith praised the collection saying, “[Tomine] has more ideas in twenty panels than novelists have in a lifetime.”

Comics artist Chris Ware said of the compilation: “As a serious cartoonist, one secretly hopes to create ‘That Book’: a book that can be passed to a literary-minded person who doesn’t normally read comics: one that doesn’t require any explanation or apology in advance and is developed enough in its attitude, humanity, and complexity that it speaks maturely for itself… Adrian Tomine‘s Killing and Dying may finally be That Book, and I’m amazed and heartened by it.”

=== Album art ===
Tomine has contributed to several rock bands‘ album packaging design, including liner notes and album art for Eels' Electro-Shock Blues, "Last Stop: This Town", "Cancer for the Cure", and End Times; Yo La Tengo's 2006 covers albums Yo La Tengo Is Murdering the Classics and Murder in the Second Degree; The Softies' It's Love; and The Crabs' What Were Flames Now Smolder.

=== Commercial illustration and The New Yorker ===
Tomine regularly works in commercial illustration. He frequently contributes illustrations and has done several magazine covers for The New Yorker; his first was the sequence entitled "Missed Connection". Tomine also illustrated the "Alpha Teens," a group of cartoon characters who appeared in commercial bumpers for Noggin's teen block, The N.

== Collected works ==
- 1998 – 32 Stories: The Complete Optic Nerve Mini-Comics (ISBN 1-896597-00-9)
- 1998 – Sleepwalk and Other Stories (ISBN 1-896597-12-2)
- 2002 – Summer Blonde (ISBN 1-896597-57-2)
- 2004 – Scrapbook: Uncollected Work 1990–2004 (ISBN 1-896597-77-7)
- 2005 – New York Sketches 2004 (ISBN 0-9766848-2-9)
- 2007 – Shortcomings (ISBN 978-1-897299-16-6)
- 2011 – Scenes From an Impending Marriage (ISBN 978-1770460348)
- 2012 – New York Drawings (ISBN 978-1770460874)
- 2015 – Killing and Dying (ISBN 978-1770462090)
- 2020 – The Loneliness of the Long-Distance Cartoonist (ISBN 978-1770463950)

== Awards ==
- 2021 Eisner Award for Best Graphic Memoir for The Loneliness of the Long-Distance Cartoonist
