= Matt Feazell =

American cartoonist

- Born: Matthew Jordan Feazell; 1955 (age 70–71)
- Area: Cartoonist
- Notable works: Cynicalman

Matt Feazell (born 1955) is an American cartoonist from Hamtramck, Michigan, primarily working in minicomics. He is best known for his wryly humorous The Amazing Cynicalman series and the simple "stick figure" art style he uses for it. Cynicalman appears in the introduction to Scott McCloud's book Understanding Comics, in which Feazell's work is cited as an example of "iconic" art taken to its greatest degree.

== Early life and education ==
Feazell was born in Ames, Iowa. In high school he experimented with stick-figure comics, but also developed a more traditional comics style. Feazell's comics influences included Jack Kirby, Hank Ketcham, and Will Eisner.

He received his B.S. in Community/Fine Arts from Southern Illinois University.

== Career ==
In addition to self-publishing Cynicalman, Feazell's work has been published by Aardvark-Vanaheim, AC Comics, Arrow Comics, Caliber Press, Fictioneer Books, Last Gasp, NBM Publishing, Eclipse Comics, and First Comics. Steeldragon Press published his series Ant-Boy from 1986 to 1988. From 2004 to 2007, he was also a regular contributor to Disney Adventures magazine with his strip "Dizzy Adventures."

A regular on the small press comics festival scene, he has appeared at multiple local comic-cons throughout the Midwest.

=== The Amazing Cynicalman ===
In the 1980s Feazell produced short pieces entitled "The Adventures of Zot! in Dimension 10½" which appeared as backup stories in issues of Scott McCloud's series Zot!.

In 1980, Feazell created a stick figure character named Cynicalman. Asked about the character's name, Feazell explained that he "was having a bad day." Discussing his choice to draw stick figures, he described them as "art (that's) so simple – it verges on calligraphy," and added that thin characters let him condense more information into panels. He also expressed hope that stick figures would inspire people to draw their own comics, advising, "Don't try to fool people into thinking that you're a great artist. Draw what you want to draw. Discover the comic within you – just draw that."

Cynicalman and his supporting cast (including Antisocialman, CuteGirl, and StupidBoy) have been featured in Feazell's minicomics, and in a weekly newspaper strip carried in a few Michigan papers from 1997 to 2002. Some of his work has been collected in paperbacks entitled Cynicalman, The Paperback (1987, minicomics material), ERT! Not Available Comics (1995, minicomics), and The Amazing Cynicalman (the newspaper strip). A weekly color strip, Cynicalman, America's Laid-Off Superhero, ran on Serializer.net.

Feazell has made a graphic novel called The Death of Antisocialman featuring Antisocialman and multiple characters from the Cynicalman comics. There are 12 chapters in the novel series, all of which are available on Feazell's site.

In 2012, Feazell released The Amazing Cynicalman, a feature-length film he wrote and directed, based on his comics work.
