= Carl Gafford =

American comics creator (1953–2020)

- Born: Karl Douglas Gafford; November 23, 1953
- Died: July 13, 2020 (aged 66)
- Areas: Cartoonist, Writer, Editor, Colourist
- Pseudonyms: Gaff; Douglas Gafford Jones
- Notable works: The Amazing World of DC Comics; The Legion of Super-Heroes

Carl Gafford (November 23, 1953–July 13, 2020) was a colorist (and occasional editor) who worked for several decades in the comics industry. He worked for a number of publishers during his career, including Marvel Comics, DC Comics, and Topps Comics. Gafford was notable for his use of the "color hold" technique in his coloring work (where the black areas of the art are replaced with another color).

== Biography ==
=== Early life and education ===
Carl Gafford was a member of comics fandom as a teen, writing and drawing his own ditto machine fanzine Minotaur from 1968 to 1972, as well as contributing art and writing to other fanzines and the amateur press alliance CAPA-alpha ("K-a") beginning in December 1970. In c. 1968, he created Blue Plaque Publications, the first minicomic co-op, a cooperative of minicomic creators that traded and promoted small press comics and fanzines, that exists to this day.

Gafford had an itinerant path through higher education, attending Western Connecticut State University for two years, the University of Massachusetts Boston for one year, and San Francisco State University for one year. He earned his B.A. in history from the College of Staten Island.

=== Early comics career ===
Gafford began his professional career at DC Comics as an assistant proofreader in the production department in March 1973, and was promoted to full proofreader at the end of the year with the retirement of Gerta Gattel. Gafford started coloring feature pages in the production department, eventually doing regular freelance coloring beginning with Justice League of America #115. He was promoted to assistant production manager in August 1974 and began work on DC's in-house fanzine, The Amazing World of DC Comics, doing editing, writing, production work and color separations.

Gafford moved to San Francisco in September 1976, then to Los Angeles in 1977 to color and write for the Hanna-Barbera comics produced for Marvel Comics. Titles included Yogi Bear, The Flintstones, Scooby-Doo, Laff-A-Lympics and others. During this time, Gafford also worked in Hanna-Barbera's layout department on such TV shows as Godzilla and Super Friends before returning to New York City in August 1978. Gafford went to work in Marvel Comics' production department, first as a freelancer then as the staff typesetter.

Gafford left Marvel in January 1981 and began freelancing for both DC and Marvel, one of the few colorists to work at both companies at the same time. He returned to staff at DC in the summer of 1981 as the proofreader, then by year's end had become Len Wein's assistant editor on Justice League, The Flash, Teen Titans, and the Batman books. At this time, Gafford became editor of Adventure Comics Digest, and with writer Bob Rozakis revived the Challengers of the Unknown, with art first by George Tuska and later by Alex Toth. Gafford also wrote most of the short-lived Creeper backup series in The Flash, featuring British artist Dave Gibbons' first work for DC — though most of the scripts were scrapped after a change of editors. He colored the second-to-last issue and was the artist on the final back-up.

During this time, Gafford began coloring The Legion of Super-Heroes with #288, and continued on that run for seven years without missing an issue, totaling 125 regular issues, giants, miniseries and two different Legion books a month for a year.

Gafford returned to freelance coloring for DC and Marvel in summer 1982.

=== 1990s ===
In June 1990, Gafford began working for Disney Comics, producing a series of comics based on Mickey Mouse, Goofy, new TV cartoon shows like Chip 'n Dale Rescue Rangers and Duck Tales, and the continuation of Uncle Scrooge and Walt Disney's Comics and Stories from Gladstone Publishing. He freelanced for Dark Horse Comics and Innovation while at Disney, and did some editing of the final Disney Comics publication, an Aladdin miniseries, while helping to transition the end of the Disney Comics line, returning the license to Gladstone Publishing.

In March 1993, Gafford moved back to New York to help Jim Shooter launch his new Defiant Comics line.

In June 1993, Gafford was hired by former Marvel editor Jim Salicrup for the new line of Topps Comics, produced by the sports trading card publisher Topps. Gafford was laid off from Topps at the end of January 1997 along with other staffers, including editor-in-chief Salicrup. The few who remained were let go before year's end, and some of the inventory eventually saw print at Dark Horse Comics.

Starting in 1994, Gafford returned to writing and drawing, this time for the anthropomorphic (furry) market, and produced material that saw print at Antarctic Press, Radio Comics, and Shanda Fantasy Arts. He also wrote and drew original comics stories reminiscent of 1950s and '60s superhero genres which saw print in Big Bang Comics: two stories were redrawn by other artists, but the final one ("Ladybug," a combination of Fly Girl and Supergirl) featured Gafford's own art, the last to appear in print.

=== Personal life and death ===
Gafford and his first wife Sharon had a son, William, born in May 1985. The couple separated in 1986 and divorced in 1991. He was also married and divorced to Garrett Gafford.

Gafford died July 13, 2020, from complications related to diabetes.
