= Clay Geerdes =

American writer and photographer (1934–1997)

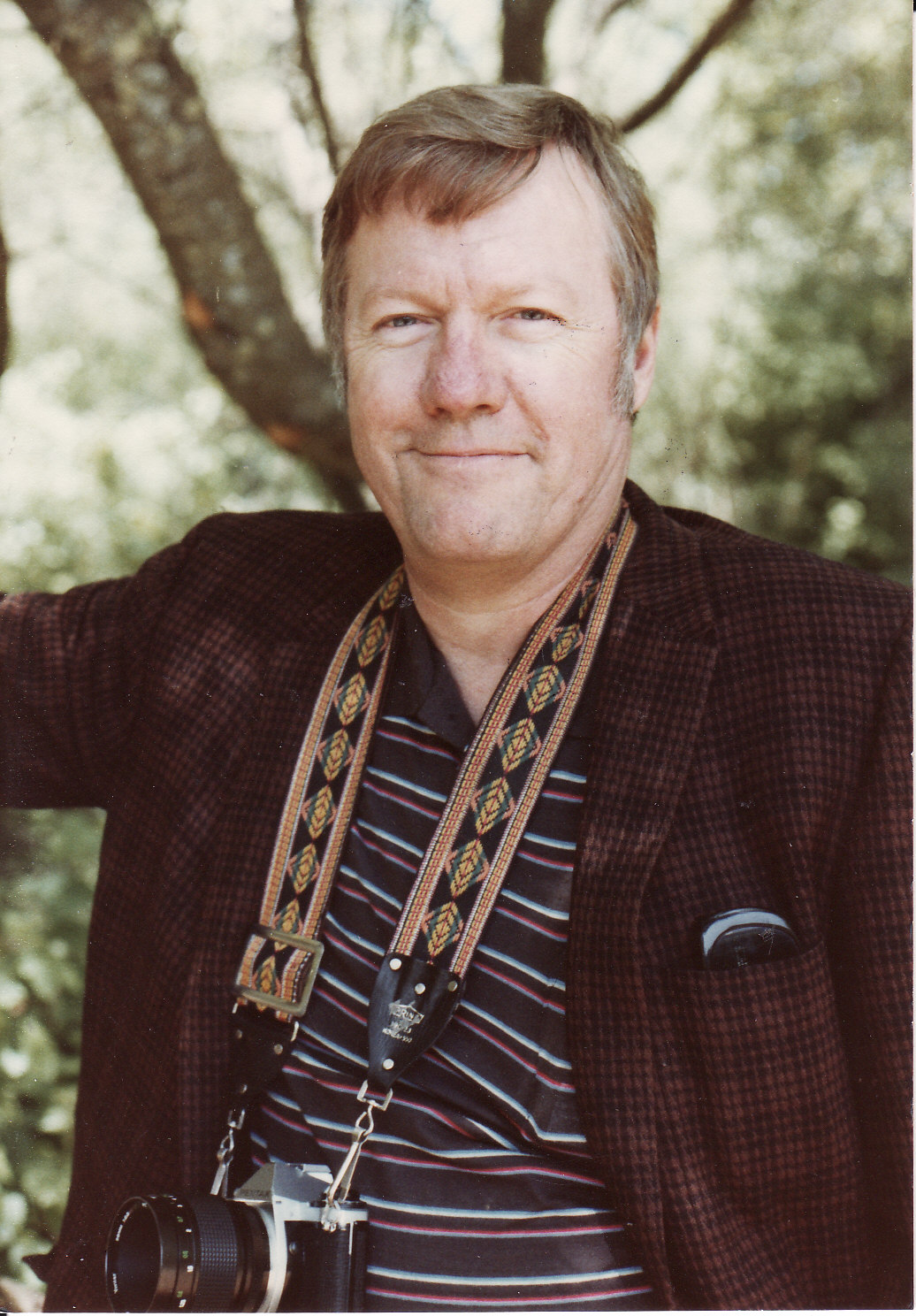
- Photo taken of Clay Geerdes from 1991 at San Francisco.
- Born: May 25, 1934; Sioux City, Iowa, U.S.
- Died: July 8, 1997 (aged 63); San Francisco, California, U.S.
- Education: San Francisco State College, B.A. in literature, M.A. in English
- Occupations: Writer, Photojournalist, Publisher, Teacher

Clay Geerdes (May 25, 1934 – July 8, 1997) was a writer, photojournalist, publisher, and teacher, who covered various events from anti-Vietnam war demonstrations in Berkeley, to productions of Freestore and The Cockettes, to the underground comics business.

== Biography ==
=== Early years ===
Geerdes was born in Sioux City, Iowa, United States, and was the oldest of three children. He grew up in Lincoln, Nebraska and was an avid collector of Batman, Superman, and Bugs Bunny comic books. When Geerdes was in his mid-teens, his father died after a long illness. Geerdes worked in a number of small jobs at cafes, hotels, and grocery stores in the Lincoln area. Geerdes enlisted in the U.S. Navy in 1954 and served a 4-year tour. He served on the USS Chemung and visited numerous ports from Australia to Japan. San Francisco became his new home at the end of his Navy tour.

=== College years ===
In 1958, Geerdes enrolled at San Francisco State College and received his B.A. in literature. He continued his enrollment at SF State College to complete a M.A. in English. Geerdes enrolled at the University of California, Berkeley, to study for a doctorate in English literature. His dissertation was complete, but he was more interested in the growing political movement at Berkeley than completing his last few classes.

Geerdes got a teaching job in 1965 in the English department at Fresno State College. His classes were mostly for the freshmen student body, covering standard college literature. Geerdes left Fresno State College after nearly three years to teach at Sonoma State College in their English department, an appointment which had ended by 1972.

=== Journalism and underground comix ===
Geerdes's first published work was in Michael Corrigan's Pillar, but his photojournalism career started in 1968 with the Los Angeles Free Press. His articles covered a variety of subjects from the demonstrations in People's Park to the personalities in underground comic books. Geerdes also wrote for other underground newspapers such as The Staff, Berkeley Barb, The Village Voice, and the S.F. Phoenix from 1968 through the mid-1970s. He was also a long-time contributor to Adam, Hustler, and Knight magazines.

Geerdes's interest in the people within the underground comix scene started from a chance meeting with Roger Brand in 1970. Geerdes wrote articles on Brand, Ron Turner, Robert Crumb, Fred Schrier, Dave Sheridan, Gilbert Shelton, and other personalities in underground comix. The articles appeared in the Los Angeles Free Press, The Staff, and the Berkeley Barb newspapers throughout the early-to-mid 1970s.

Geerdes's Comix World newsletter began in 1973 and ended in 1984. The newsletter focused on newly released books, artists, and related activities. By 1980, Comix World was being mailed to every state in America and 14 countries.

He was heavily involved with Berkeleycon, the first comic book convention that really highlighted underground comix; held in 1973, 1974, and 1976 (when it was known as "Underground '76").

Geerdes started the Comix Wave newsletter in 1983, which concentrated on the “newave” era with minicomics. Minicomics were self-published books by the artists, and many new artists were inspired from Geerdes's newsletters to publish their own work. Comix Wave ended regular publication in 1995. He worked with numerous people in this new era of underground comics, such as Kevin Eastman, Jim Valentino, Par Holman, Bob Vojtko, David Miller, Brad Foster, and many others.

The last publication Geerdes wrote for was the Anderson Valley Advertiser from 1995 to 1997. He was a frequent contributor, writing about aspects of his life and his observations of current events.

Geerdes's photographs have appeared in numerous publications after his death in 1997. The Underground Comix Family Album by Malcolm Whyte, from 1998, has 50 of Geerdes' photographs of the people associated with shaping the underground comix business. A book about San Diego Comic-Con, Comic-Con: 40 Years of Artists, Writers, Fans, & Friends also published some of Geerdes's photographs. The Snatch Comics Treasury from Apex Joint Ventures reprinted Robert Crumb's work while adding some photographs from Geerdes.

Geerdes shot the cover photograph for Michael Corrigan's hybrid memoir, Confessions of a Shanty Irishman (America House, 2001).

Geerdes died on July 8, 1997, in San Francisco from liver cancer.
