= John Porcellino =

American cartoonist (born 1968)

- Porcellino, photographed at the 2004 Alternative Press Expo (APE) in San Francisco.
- Born: September 18, 1968 (age 58) Chicago, Illinois
- Area: Cartoonist
- Notable works: King-Cat Comics
- Awards: Ignatz Award, 2005

John Porcellino (born September 18, 1968) is an American cartoonist and creator of minicomics. Porcellino's self-published, photocopied, mostly autobiographical series King-Cat Comics is among the best-known and longest-running minicomics produced today. Porcellino created King-Cat in May 1989, and to date has self-published 79 issues.

== Career ==
For several years Porcellino had his own music and comics distribution company, Grinding Wheels Enterprises (evolving later into Spit and a Half), but he eventually abandoned it and went back to just publishing his own work. In the '90s Porcellino did some stories about his struggles to find a publisher for his work, and reprinted several of the rejection letters that criticized his drawing skills. He was briefly in negotiations to do an entire Trail Watch book, but that project fell through. Porcellino still mostly publishes himself, although now this is apparently mostly by choice.

In recent years other publishers have been publishing collections of his work, including the graphic novel Perfect Example, chronicling his teenage struggles with depression. La Mano, Zak Sally's publishing venture, released Porcellino's Diary of a Mosquito Abatement Man, collecting various King-Cat stories about Porcellino's experiences as a pest control worker. The book won an Ignatz Award at the 2005 Small Press Expo in Bethesda, Maryland. Porcellino was the subject of the 2014 full-length documentary, Root Hog or Die. The film, produced by Dan Stafford of Kilgore Books & Comics, was shot over a five-year period and includes footage of Porcellino on a tour of the southern United States following the release of his collection, Map of My Heart.

Many of Porcellino's comics' contemporaries are interviewed in the film, including Jeffrey Brown, Ivan Brunetti, Noah Van Sciver, and Zak Sally. The film premiered at the Small Press Expo in 2014.

== Style ==
Porcellino's graphic style is simple and spare, sometimes to the point of abstraction. He works almost exclusively in black and white, representing people, the natural world, and the built environment with a minimum of lines. Describing the subtle maturation of Porcellino's style over the many years of King-Cat, critic Paddy Johnston notes that "the essence of Porcellino's art, and of his visual storytelling, remains the same: sparse black and white lines simply detailing moments from his life with particular emotional resonance."

== Personal life ==
Porcellino lived in Denver, Colorado, from 1992 to 1998. He acquired his beloved cat Maisie Kukoc in March 1992 (the cat died in 2007). He married his longtime "sweetheart" Kera in September 1996 in Elgin, Illinois. They honeymooned in Tucson, Arizona. By this time, Porcellino had been suffering from hyperacusis for some years, and had begun exploring holistic healing options, including yoga, meditation, and the study of Zen Buddhism.

In 1997 Porcellino began suffering from severe abdominal pain that eventually resulted in the removal of a benign tumor from his small intestine. After living in Denver for six years, in early 1998 Porcellino and Kera moved back to his home state of Illinois, first back home to Hoffman Estates and then to Kera's parents' house in Elgin. After two years out of the job market, Porcellino got a job at a health food store. In the spring and summer of 1998 Porcellino again dealt with a severe illness, possibly related to pesticide exposure from his years spent as a mosquito abatement worker. Consulting with an environmental medicine specialist helped, and through the rest of 1998 Porcellino's health began to improve — but then he was diagnosed with obsessive–compulsive disorder (OCD).

In September 1999, Porcellino and Kera were divorced after three years of marriage.

For months after September 11 attacks, Porcellino's OCD rendered him unable to produce comics.

In September 2002, Porcellino married Misun Oh, whom he had met via the letter column of King-Cat. Later that year the couple moved back to Denver, partly so Misun could finish her studies in traditional Chinese medicine. They divorced in 2010.

Porcellino married Stephanie Anne Dorman in March 2020.

Porcellino currently lives in Beloit, Wisconsin.

== Bibliography ==
=== Comics and graphic novels ===
- King-Cat Comics and Stories (Spit and a Half, ongoing publication 1989 – present)
- Diary of a Mosquito Abatement Man (La Mano, 2005) ISBN 097652550X
- Perfect Example (Drawn and Quarterly, 2005) ISBN 1896597750
- King-Cat Classix (Drawn and Quarterly, 2007) ISBN 1894937910
- Thoreau at Walden (Hyperion, 2008) ISBN 1423100387
- Map of My Heart (Drawn and Quarterly, 2009) ISBN 1897299931
- The Next Day (Pop Sandbox, 2011) ISBN 0986488410
- The Hospital Suite (Drawn and Quarterly 2014) ISBN 1770461647
- From Lone Mountain (Drawn and Quarterly 2018) ISBN 9781770462953
- South Beloit Journal (Uncivilized Comics 2017) ISBN 9780988351318
- The Next Day (with writers Paul Peterson and Jason Gilmore, Pop Sandbox 2011) ISBN 9780986488412

=== Poetry ===
- Three Poems about Fog (self-published, 2006)
- The Ones That Everybody Knows (self-published, 2007)
- On Ruby Hill: Poems, 1997-2002 (self-published, 2009)
