= Prostitution in Canada =

Current laws passed by the Parliament of Canada in 2014 make it illegal to purchase or advertise sexual services and illegal to live on the material benefits from sex work. The law officially enacted criminal penalties for "Purchasing sexual services and communicating in any place for that purpose."

This marks the first time in Canadian history that the exchange of sexual services for money has been made illegal. The Canadian Department of Justice claims that the new legal framework "reflects a significant paradigm shift away from the treatment of prostitution as 'nuisance', as found by the Supreme Court of Canada in Bedford, toward treatment of prostitution as a form of sexual exploitation". Many sex workers' rights organizations, however, argue that the new law entrenches and maintains harm against sex workers since sex workers are still committing a crime, albeit there is an immunity from arrest for material benefits and advertising.

The new laws came in response to the Canada (AG) v Bedford ruling of the Supreme Court of Canada, which found the laws prohibiting brothels to be unconstitutional, public communication for the purpose of prostitution and living on the profits of prostitution. The ruling gave Parliament of Canada 12 months to rewrite the prostitution laws with a stay of effect so that the current laws remain in force. Amending legislation came into effect on December 6, 2014, which made the purchase of sexual services illegal.

== Background ==
There has long been a general agreement that the status quo of prostitution in Canada was problematic, but there has been little consensus on what should be done. There is an ideological disagreement between those who want to see prostitution eliminated, generally because they view it either as an exploitative or unacceptable part of society, and those advocating decriminalization because they view sex workers as having agency and prostitution as a transaction. Advocates of decriminalization believe that prohibition encourages the exploitation of sex workers by denying them legal and regulatory protections. The Conservative government ensured that Canada's current prostitution law was committed to a prohibitionist position.

While the act of exchanging sex for money has been legal for most of Canada's history, the prohibition of the activities surrounding the sex trade has made it difficult to practise prostitution without breaking any law. This is the first time that the exchange of sexual services for money is made illegal.

The term "sex work" is used interchangeably with "prostitution" in this article, in accordance with the World Health Organization (WHO 2001; WHO 2005) and the United Nations (UN 2006; UNAIDS 2002).

== History ==
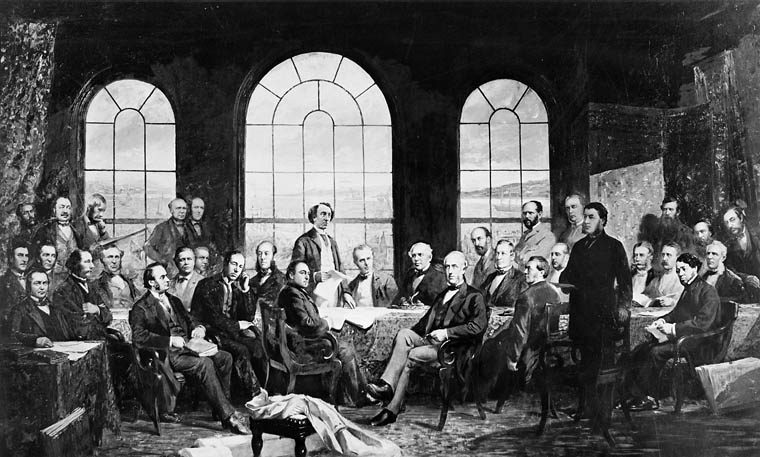
The Fathers of Confederation in 1864

Canada inherited laws from the United Kingdom. The first recorded laws dealing with prostitution were in Nova Scotia in 1759. Following Canadian Confederation in 1867, the laws were consolidated in the Criminal Code in 1892. These dealt principally with pimping, procuring, operating brothels and soliciting. Most amendments to date have dealt with the latter. Originally classified as a vagrancy offence, this was amended to soliciting in 1972 and communicating in 1985. Since inclusion of the Charter of Rights and Freedoms in the Canadian constitution, the constitutionality of Canada's prostitution laws have been challenged on a number of occasions, culminating with the Supreme Court striking down several provisions of the law in Canada (AG) v Bedford in 2013, leading to a new legislative approach introduced in 2014.

Before the provisions were struck down, the Criminal Code made the following unlawful:

- owning, managing, leasing, occupying, or being found in a bawdy house, as defined in Section 197 (Section 210) declared invalid by the Ontario Court of Appeal, March 2012.
- transporting anyone to a bawdy house (Section 211)
- procuring (Section 212)
- Living on the avails of prostitution declared invalid by the Ontario Court of Appeal, March 2012, except in circumstances of exploitation
- paying for sex with anyone under the age of 18 (Section 212[4])
- communication in a public place for the purposes of prostitution (Section 213)
- and transporting someone for the purpose of exploiting them or facilitating their exploitation (Section 279). This does not specify for any particular purpose, such as sexual exploitation

At the turn of the twentieth century, pickpockets and pimps converged on Canadian train platforms. As an historian reported, "Young girls fleeing the dead-end monotony of rural Canada were particularly easy prey for the bordello runners. These confused newcomers were susceptible to a smiling face and soothing words that led only to a cruel life of sexual slavery."

On March 26, 2012, the Ontario Court of Appeal struck down part of two provisions, subject to appeal, and the declaration is not in effect. An appeal was lodged with the Supreme Court of Canada on April 25, 2012, including an extension of the stay in effect. Lawyers for the respondents pointed out that the last minute appeal left them little time to respond.

== Legal status ==
The activities related to sex work that are prohibited by law include operating a premises (sexual services establishment or brothel) where such activities take place, being found in such an establishment, procuring for such purposes, and communicating such services (soliciting) in a public place. This made it difficult to engage in prostitution without breaking any law. Automobiles are considered public spaces if they can be seen. On the other hand, working as an independent sex worker and private communication for such purposes (telephone, internet, e-mail, etc.) is legal. This ambivalence can cause confusion, leading one judge to refer to the laws as 'Alice-in-Wonderland', and the Chief Justice of the Supreme Court to call the situation "bizarre":

We find ourselves in an anomalous, some would say bizarre, situation where almost everything related to prostitution has been regulated by the criminal law except the transaction itself. The appellants' argument then, more precisely stated, is that in criminalizing so many activities surrounding the act itself, Parliament has made prostitution de facto illegal if not de jure illegal., per Dickson CJ at page 44

The legal situation has also been challenged in the rulings of two courts in Ontario in Bedford v. Canada—the respondents/appellants are sex worker activists Terri-Jean Bedford, Amy Lebovitch, and Valerie Scott—which described the laws as "ancient" and emphasized that the purpose of the laws was not to eradicate prostitution but to mitigate harms emanating from it: "We are satisfied that the challenged provisions are not aimed at eradicating prostitution, but only some of the consequences associated with it, such as disruption of neighbourhoods and the exploitation of vulnerable women by pimps." OCA at 169

In a dissenting opinion (2:3) regarding the potential harm of the laws, the appellate justices wrote:

The 1985 addition of the communicating provision to the existing bawdy-house and living on the avails provisions created an almost perfect storm of danger for prostitutes. Prostitutes were first driven to the streets, and then denied the one defence, communication, that allowed them to evaluate prospective clients in real time. OCA at 364

'Prostitution' is not defined in Canadian statute law, but is based on case law which deems that three elements are necessary to establish that prostitution is taking place: (i) provision of sexual services, (ii) the indiscriminate nature of the act (soliciting rather than choosing clients), and (iii) the necessity for some form of payment.

On October 25, 2012, the Supreme Court of Canada granted leave to appeal and cross-appeal the Ontario Court of Appeal Bedford decision. The court also granted the motion to stay the Ontario Court of Appeal decision until judgement is passed, meaning that the Criminal Code sections at stake were still in force in Ontario. Chief Justice Beverley McLachlan wrote:

These appeals and the cross-appeal are not about whether prostitution should be legal or not. They are about whether the laws Parliament has enacted on how prostitution may be carried out pass constitutional muster. I conclude that they do not. I would therefore make a suspended declaration of invalidity, returning the question of how to deal with prostitution to Parliament.

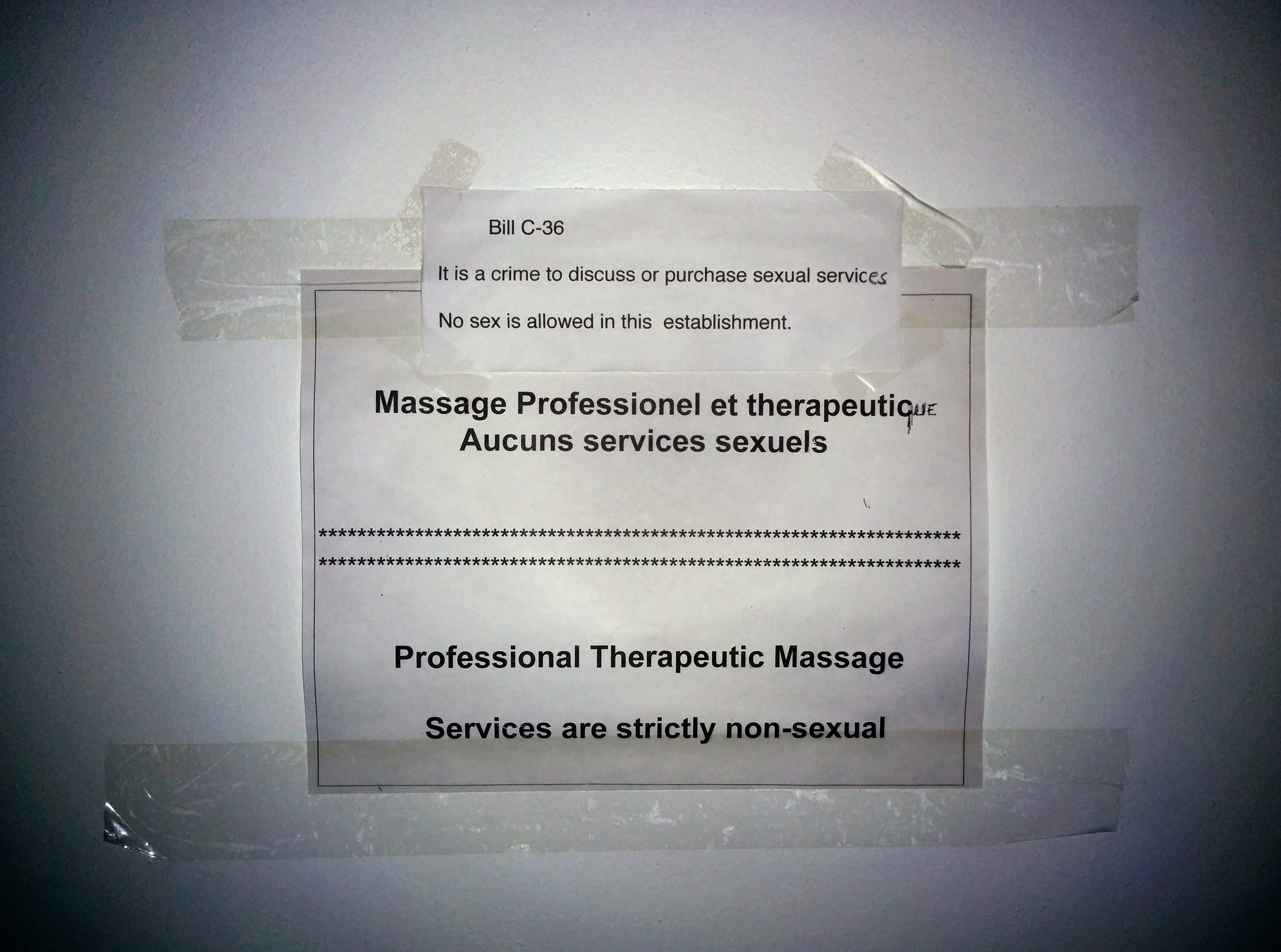
Sign about Bill C-36 in a massage parlour in Montreal, September 2015

In a decision dated December 20, 2013, the Supreme Court of Canada struck down the laws in question. They delayed the enforcement of their decision for one year—also applicable to the Ontario sections—to give the government a chance to write new laws. Following the announcement of the decision, Valerie Scott stated in the media that, regardless of the decision, sex workers must be involved in the process of constructing the new legislation: "The thing here is politicians, though they may know us as clients, they do not understand how sex work works. They won't be able to write a half-decent law. It will fail. That's why you must bring sex workers to the table in a meaningful way."

In response, Peter MacKay, the Minister of Justice, introduced amending legislation, C-36, the "Protection of Communities and Exploited Persons Act" on June 4, 2014, which received first reading. It came into effect on December 6, 2014. The act is criticized by sex workers who believe that it is worse for their safety than the previous law because it forces the sex industry further underground.

=== Nordic model approach to prostitution ===
Bill C-36, the Protection of Communities and Exploited Persons Act, introduced by Conservative Party leader Stephen Harper, received Royal Assent on November 6, 2014. The legislation was opposed by all opposition parties, including the Liberals, who declared that the legislation was unconstitutional and did not follow the guidelines set out in Bedford v. Canada. Justin Trudeau promised to further reform Bill C-36 during his 2015 federal election campaign. As of 2021, there has been no reformation of the legislation.

The legislation treats sex work as a form of exploitation and sexual inequality (the Criminal Code only addresses women and girls in this legislation). Between 2009 and 2014, women accounted for 43% of prostitution related offences, but when the legislation was enacted in 2014, only 9% of those accused of prostitution offences were female while there was an increase to 81% for male prostitution offences. Unfortunately, given the language of the legislation, it is unclear if transgender sex workers are addressed under the law. There has been very limited research on transgender people in the sex-trade industry. Bill C-36 claims to protect the dignity and equality of all Canadians by prohibiting the purchasing of sexual services. Bill C-36 was heavily influenced by the Nordic model approach to prostitution.

The Nordic Model offers an asymmetrical solution to sex work where the purchase of sexual services is criminalized while the sale of sexual services is decriminalised. This is usually supplemented with better access to welfare and exiting resources. In Canada, Bill C-36 criminalizes the purchasing of sex while decriminalizing the selling of sexual services. The Criminal Code identifies the operation of bawdy-houses as an offence, which prohibits sex workers from operating indoors. It also declares sexual service advertising a criminal offence, as well as procuring and communicating. The legislation also outlines the different offences that are connected to human trafficking. Overall, the model seeks the abolition of prostitution by targeting demand.

Prostitution legislation in Canada has been criticized by sex workers, for it reinforces violence against them and undermines access to social systems. Bill C-36 has prohibited the use of indoor prostitution, yet this has merely displaced sex work rather than reduce it whilst making it more difficult for sex workers to control their environments. A survey was produced by Nanos Research for the London Abused Women's Centre, conducted in London, Ontario in 2020. The survey asked over 1,000 Canadians, 18 years or older, questions over the telephone and online regarding their opinions on Bill C-36. The poll results suggested that:

- 49% of Canadians support the legislation
- 61% of Canadians agree that government funding should be provided to women involved in the sex industry
- 34% of Canadians agreed that sex work should be viewed as a profession; but 45% were opposed to establishing sex work, including pimping and brothel-operating, as a legal profession.

== Economic Factors That Impact Sex Workers In Canada ==
The cost of living is rising in Canada and in many major cities it is becoming increasingly unaffordable to live. This is particularly true for Canadians with disabilities who are unable to work and rely on Disability Assistance as the cost of living is increasing and Disability Assistance is unable to meet the cost of living.

To use British Columbia as an example. As a single person with disability you can earn up to $1,483.50 in Disability Assistance. If you are single but if you make more than $16,200 a year you will no longer be eligible for benefits. The average cost of living for a single adult in BC as of 2025 is $3,400 - $4000 a month. Even if you received the full amount of Disability Assistance and made $16,200 a year in income you would still only have a monthly income of $2,833.50, still not close to the average cost of living.

A report was released (2023) from The Transitions Metro Vancouver Consortium titled ‘By Us, For Us’ (BUFU). This report was developed and run by sex workers in the Lower Mainland and on Vancouver Island. One of the main takeaways from this report was that 3 in 4 sex workers live with disability. Researchers found that 73% of sex workers studied lived with at least one disability.

== Constitutional and case law ==
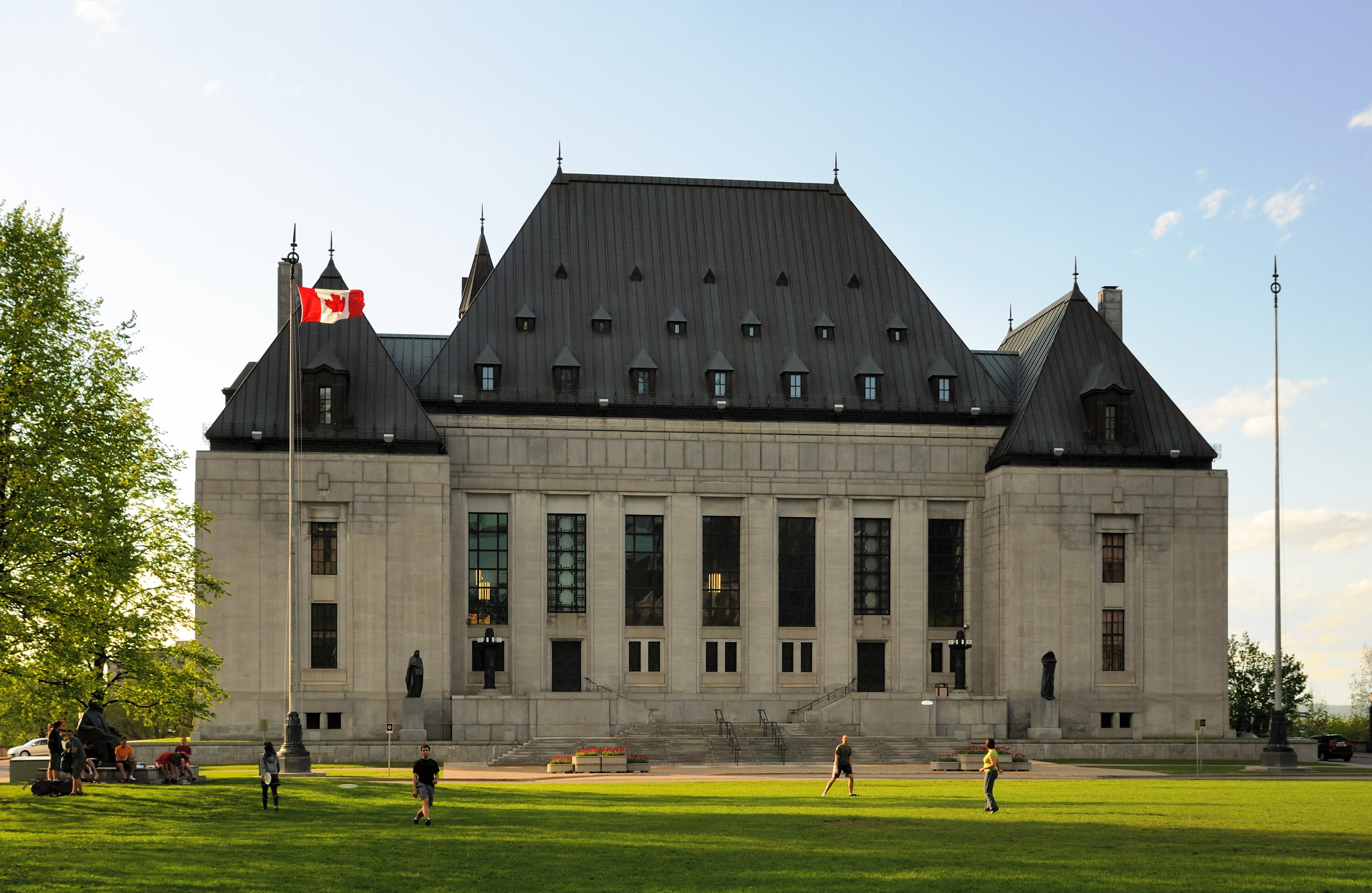
Supreme Court of Canada building

The passage of the Canadian Charter of Rights and Freedoms in 1982 allowed for the provision of challenging the constitutionality of laws governing prostitution in Canada in addition to interpretative case law. Other legal proceedings have dealt with ultra vires issues (whether a jurisdiction, such as a Provincial Government or municipality, has the powers to legislate on the matter).

In 1990, the Supreme Court of Canada upheld the law which bans public solicitation of prostitution, arguing that the law had the goal to abolish prostitution, which was a valid goal. Reference re ss. 193 and 195.1 of Criminal Code, (the Prostitution Reference), [1990] 1 S.C.R. 1123 is a decision of the Supreme Court of Canada on the right to freedom of expression under section 2(b) of the Canadian Charter of Rights and Freedoms, and on prostitution. The Court held that, although the Criminal Code provision that prohibited communication for the purpose of engaging in prostitution was in violation of the right to freedom of expression, it could be justified under section 1 of the Charter and so it was upheld. The majority found, with a 5:2 split and both women dissenting, that the purpose of eliminating prostitution was a valid goal, and that the provision was rationally connected and proportional to that goal. Accordingly, the provision was upheld.

In 2010, a decision of the Ontario Superior Court in Bedford v. Canada held that the key provisions of the Criminal Code dealing with prostitution (keeping a bawdy house, living off the avails; and soliciting or communicating for the purpose) were invalid, but a stay of effect was put in place. This was appealed by the crown resulting in a decision by the Ontario Court of Appeal on March 26, 2012. That court upheld the lower court's ruling on bawdy houses, modified the ruling on living on the avails to make exploitation a criminal offence, but reversed the decision on soliciting, holding that the effect on communities justified the limitation. Two of the five judges dissented from the last ruling, stating that the law on solicitation was not justifiable. The court continued a stay of effect of a further twelve months on the first provision, and thirty days on the second.

Both parties had up to sixty days to appeal this decision to the Supreme Court of Canada and on April 25, the federal government stated it would do so. On October 25, 2012, the Supreme Court of Canada agreed to hear the appeal. The Supreme Court also agreed to hear a cross-appeal by sex-trade workers on the Court of Appeal for Ontario's decision to ban solicitation. The Supreme Court of Canada heard the case on June 13, 2013, and unanimously overturned all restrictions on sex work, ruling that a ban on solicitation and brothels violated prostitutes' rights to safety.

Meanwhile, a related challenge was mounted in British Columbia in 2007, but did not proceed due to a procedural motion by the Attorney General of Canada seeking dismissal on the grounds of lack of standing by the litigants. This was upheld by the BC Supreme Court in 2008, but successfully appealed in 2010. The Attorney General then appealed this decision of the British Columbia Court of Appeal to the Supreme Court of Canada who released their decision on September 21, 2012. They dismissed the appeal enabling the case to once again proceed in the court of first instance.

== Demographics ==
=== Justice Statistics ===
The Canadian Centre for Justice Statistics report Street Prostitution in Canada (1993) stated that police activity was mainly directed at the street level. Over 10,000 prostitution-related incidents were reported in 1992, of which 95% were communicating offences and 5% were bawdy-house and pimping offences.

In 1997, they reported a sharp increase in the number of prostitution-related incidents recorded by police for 1995, following two years of decline. Since these are police figures they are just as likely to reflect enforcement rather than actual activity. The report also stated that in the period 1991–1995, 63 known prostitutes were murdered (5% of all women killed in Canada).

Separate reports have not been published since, but included in Crime Statistics in Canada. Data from the 2007 report show 5,679 offences in 2006 (17/100,000 population), and 4,724 in 2007 (14). This translates into a change of −17.6% between 2006 and 2007, and −27.6% between 1998 and 2007.

=== Other ===
The exact number of people in sex work is not known, since this cannot be collected reliably. Estimates vary widely, and should be interpreted with caution.

About 10-33% of all prostitutes have been estimated to work primarily outside, and are thus more visible. The 2006 Subcommittee on Solicitation estimated 5–20%.

According to some estimates, most sex workers are young women (average 22–25) who began working between 16 and 20. Most are single though it is estimated that 30-70% of prostitutes have children. In some field studies, 62% of prostitutes in Vancouver, 50% in Toronto, and 69% in Montréal claimed that they worked for themselves, while the presence and influence of pimps was more extensive in the Maritimes and on the Prairies. Drug use has been found to vary substantially by region and gender; it is highest in the Atlantic provinces, lowest in Québec, and appears to be a problem for men more than women. However, all these figures need to be interpreted with caution and compared to the general population.

Indigenous women and girls are overrepresented in street sex and trafficking trade.

A 1998 poll suggested 7% of Canadian men have paid for sex at least once in their life. This is much lower than in the United States, where in 1994, 18% of men stated they had paid for sex. That figure declined slightly to 15% in 2004.

== Street prostitution ==
Nearly all law enforcement of prostitution laws concerns the people involved in street prostitution, with the other forms of prostitution being virtually ignored. The enforcement generally focuses on the prostitutes, and not on their customers.

=== Effects of section 213 (communicating) ===
More than 90% of prosecutions are under section 213 (communicating) of the Criminal Code. Consequently, it has become the target of criticism that, while designed to prevent public nuisance, it ignores public safety. In practice, the communication law has not altered the extent of street-based sex work, but merely displaced it, often to more dangerous locations. The STAR project showed that relocation to poorly-lit, underpopulated areas reduced unwelcome attention by police and residents but increased the likelihood of 'bad dates'.

== Prostitution issues by province ==
While sex work exists in all cities, Vancouver has received a large amount of publicity due to the poor socio-economic conditions in the Downtown Eastside and the murder of a large number of women working in the sex trade, a disproportionate number of whom were aboriginal. "Body rub parlours" may be establishments in which sex work takes place, which would be illegal under bawdy house and communicating laws. Vancouver's milder climate may favour street prostitution. However, sex workers and their support services in Vancouver have been very organized and vocal in responding to media criticisms. They have an uneasy relationship with the police. British Columbia has also been the area of Canada where most research has been carried out.

With regard to the murders of 60+ sex workers, most of whom were Indigenous, from the downtown eastside of Vancouver in the 1990s, it is likely that serial killer Robert Pickton was able to kill those women specifically because they'd been displaced from the Downtown core in the "stroll" bounded by Helmcken Street north Seymour to Nelson, east to Richards and south to Helmcken Street to the industrial area in the Downtown Eastside. Subsequent trials focused national attention on the safety of sex workers under the legislation at the time, which eventually led to court cases challenging the constitutionality of those laws. Although these trials did not focus on the overrepresentation of Indigenous women in prostitution, a 2011 public inquiry into missing and murdered women again drew attention to the interaction between safety and legislation.

In 2012, a young Victoria man was convicted on charges relating to the prostitution of a child online. He was sentenced to three years in prison.

== Prostitution and health ==
A study was reported as showing that 26% of Vancouver's female sex workers were infected with HIV, and that Vancouver's overall prevalence of HIV was about 1.21%, six times higher than the national rate. Dr. Patricia Daly, chief medical health officer for Vancouver Coastal Health, was quoted as saying, "our message has always been that you should assume sex trade workers are HIV positive." This remark was criticized as offensive and inaccurate. Subsequent correspondence showed this figure to be misleading. The data actually represented injectable drug users attending health services. With more health related problems in middle age groups

Saskatchewan's HIV problems have received some publicity when health authorities blamed injectable drug users (IDU) and street sex workers in 2009. However HIV is uncommon amongst sex workers unless they are also IDUs. The Regina Street Workers Advocacy Project was critical of statements that demonized one group.

== Prostitution and minors ==
Child prostitution is illegal, but there are community concerns that it is a growing problem. The numbers of child prostitutes is disputed. According to police statistics only 5% of those charged with prostitution activities are youth and over 80% of them are young women. Others claim higher figures. A 2006 ECPAT report states that, while Statistics Canada estimates that between 10 and 15 per cent of people involved in street prostitution are under 18, this figure is viewed by most child advocates as a gross underestimate. On the other hand, doubt has been raised by UNICEF regarding ECPAT's methods.

While expansive claims have been made as to its extent, expert reports conclude that there are few reliable estimates of the extent of child prostitution. For instance, a 2002 report of the Justice Institute of British Columbia states that, "because of the illicit nature of commercial sexual exploitation, there is no way to accurately measure the number of children and youth being commercially sexually exploited. Estimates of the number of commercially sexually exploited children and youth in Canada vary greatly."

=== Federal initiatives ===
The Criminal Code was amended in 1988 to include child sexual abuse, and linking juvenile prostitution to the "procuring" section. In 1995, the Federal-Provincial-Territorial Working Group on Prostitution stated that these provisions "have been ineffective in bringing customers and pimps of youths involved in prostitution to justice." They reported that charges under these provisions were rare, and that juvenile prostitutes and their clients continued to be charged under the general summary conviction offence prohibiting street prostitution, as with adults. Enforcement problems resulted from the reluctance of youths to testify against pimps and the difficulty of apprehending clients.

==== Bill C-27 ====
The 1996 amendments addressed the Working Group report. Bill C-27 included a new indictable offence of "aggravated" procuring. This applied to pimps who coerce juveniles into prostitution through violence or intimidation, with a mandatory minimum sentence of five years in prison and a maximum sentence of 14 years. Bill C-27 extended some procedural safeguards to juvenile witnesses appearing in court, entitling them to testify outside the courtroom behind a screen (or on video). Publication bans could protect the identity of complainants or witnesses under the age of 18. The addition of an offence for obtaining or attempting to obtain the sexual services of a person whom the offender believed to be under 18 was intended to make enforcement of s. 212(4) easier; s. 212(5) then added that evidence that a person was represented to the accused as being under 18 was proof of that belief, in the absence of evidence to the contrary. It was intended that undercover agents rather than minors themselves would be used to detect such offences. Bill C-27 was given Royal Assent in April 1997.

The provinces then expressed concerns that convictions would be difficult to obtain because the Crown had to prove the belief of the accused as to the age of the young person, while the working group were unsure about the legislation's constitutionality.

==== Bill C-51 ====
In June 1998, C-51 was introduced, changing "attempts to obtain" to "communicates with any person for the purpose of obtaining" to simplify prosecution by removing any need to prove belief of age. Electronic surveillance was also explicitly allowed, and this became law in March 1999.

=== Provincial and municipal initiatives ===
In June 1999, provincial and territorial leaders declared child prostitution abuse rather than a crime and agreed to harmonize child welfare legislation. Several provinces and municipalities appointed task forces to implement the child as victim concept. Alberta led the way in this, followed by British Columbia, Saskatchewan, Manitoba, Nova Scotia and Ontario (June 2002).

==== British Columbia ====
Media reports claimed that Vancouver has about 500 street prostitutes under the age of 17, while some have claimed that many more children may be involved in indoor prostitution. Such numbers, however, should be treated with extreme caution (see above).

Approximately 50% to 80% of the child sex trade in British Columbia is carried on in massage parlours, karaoke bars, and "trick pads"; only 20% to 50% of the trade is visible above ground with children being openly solicited on the streets. In smaller BC communities, the sexual exploitation of children is even less visible. It occurs in private homes, back alleys and parks, at public docks and truck stops, and on fishing boats.

Some adolescents in care had advertised sex for sale on Craigslist when the erotic services category was still available. Craigslist removed this category on December 18, 2010.

==== Indigenous children ====
In certain areas of BC, aboriginal youth, who constitute 3–5% of the general population, account for the majority of minors working in the sex trade. Estimates of the number of aboriginal sexually exploited youth in BC range from 14% to 60%, a problem blamed on the residential schools.

==== Alberta ====
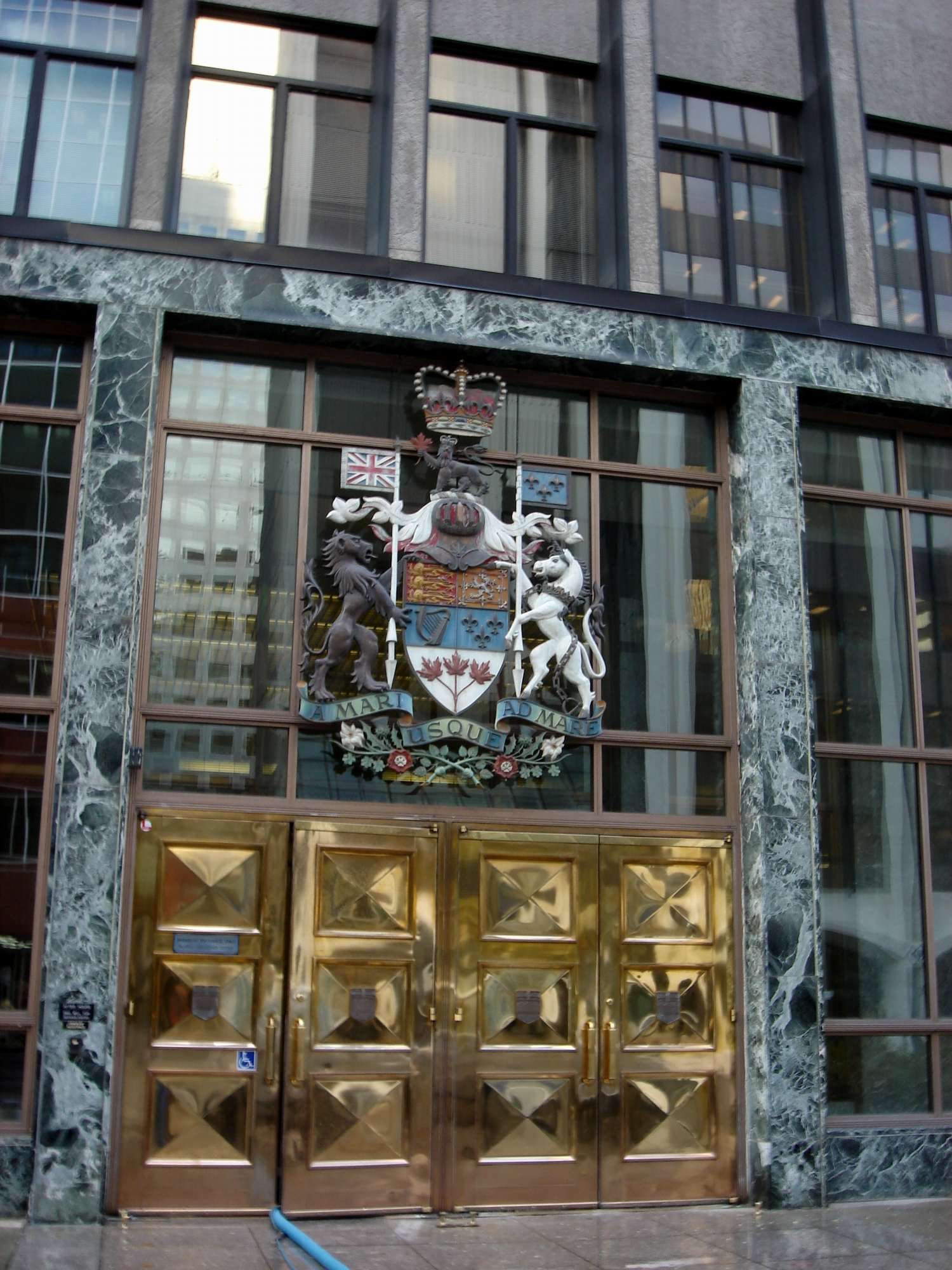
Entrance of the Queen's Bench of Alberta building (Calgary)

Alberta's Child Welfare Act (1997) added the purchase of sex from someone under 18 as child abuse, with fines up to $2,000 and/or six months in jail in addition to Criminal Code penalties.

The Protection of Children Involved in Prostitution Act (February 1999) provided that a child wanting to exit prostitution may access community support programs, but if not could be apprehended by police. They could then be confined for up to 72 hours in a protective safe house, where they can receive emergency care, treatment, assessment and planning. Customers and pimps can be charged with child sexual abuse and fined up to $25,000, 2 years jail or both.

However, in July 2000, the law was initially ruled unconstitutional. The Provincial Court determined that it did not respect a child's legal rights because it lacked the "procedural safeguards" to allow youth the right to answer allegations or seek judicial appeal. But in December the Court of Queen's Bench upheld the legislation on appeal. Nevertheless, the government had already introduced amendments ensuring that when a child is confined they be informed in writing as to why they were being confined, its duration, court dates and the right to legal representation. The child is also given an opportunity to contact Legal Aid and that they may request court review of the confinement.

Amendments were also made to enable children to receive additional care and support, including extending the confinement period for up to five days and allowing for authorities to apply for a maximum of two additional confinement periods of up to 21 days each.

==== Manitoba ====
In Winnipeg, evidence was given at a 2008 inquest that hundreds of children, some as young as eight years old, are selling sex to adult men for money, drugs and even food and shelter. It is estimated that 70% of the underage prostitutes are Aboriginal, more than 70% are wards of Child and Family Services, and more than 80% get involved after running away from their placements.

==== Ontario ====
Ontario's child welfare legislation goes further than Alberta's by allowing the province to sue pimps and others who sexually exploit children for profit, in order to recover the costs of treatment and services required by their victims.

=== Locale ===
Most child prostitutes do not work on the streets, but behind closed doors: "You can't have children standing on the corner because they will be spotted immediately. So what pimps and recruiters do is keep them off-street," said Raven Bowen, from Vancouver.

=== Recruitment ===
A 2002 British Columbia Government report stated that some children end up in prostitution after running away from home, where they may have been victims of physical and/or sexual abuse. The report cited as causes of commercial sexual exploitation of children factors such as social isolation, low self-esteem, a dysfunctional family where violence and substance misuse were common, neglect, early sexual abuse or other traumatizing experience, dropping out of school, and hidden disabilities such as Fetal Alcohol Syndrome. Many children had a history of provincial care in a foster or group home or living on their own, but some youth from well-functioning families had left home after a traumatic event becoming at risk of sexual exploitation once on the street. Some children came from families where prostitution was practised by other members, or from communities where prostitution was common.

They found that some children were preyed upon by pimps who may slowly gain their trust, befriend them and provide them with food, accommodation and clothes before hooking them on drugs and alcohol and forcing them into sexual service. However, only a small proportion were found to be controlled in this manner, and older girls frequently introduced younger ones into the trade. Some pimps were considered as boyfriends, the report found. Pimps may use romantic techniques to seduce young girls. Where pimps appeared to be involved in recruitment, they worked in areas where young people congregate such as food courts in malls, community centres and schools, preferring unsupervised venues including fast food restaurants and bus stops but also supervised locations including drop-in programs, group homes, juvenile detention centres, youth shelters and treatment centres. Runaway children are easily spotted by pimps at the bus and train stations of major Canadian cities.

=== Human trafficking in persons ===
In the early 1990s, pressure was building for action on the sexual exploitation of foreign children by Canadian tourists travelling abroad, even though the extent was unknown, leading to the introduction of a number of private member's bills in the Canadian Parliament.

C-27 (1996) amended s. 7 of the Criminal Code to address this. S. 7(4.1) extended its extraterritorial provisions to 11 sexual and sex-related offences against minors (but does not specify purchase of sex) and applies Canadian law to foreign jurisdictions.

Following enactment of C-27 in 1997, the Department of Justice was involved in the development of the United Nations' Optional Protocol to the Convention on the Rights of the Child on the sale of children, child prostitution and child pornography, and Canada became a signatory in November 2001 (in force as of January 2002). At the same time C-15 simplified such prosecutions which had previously distinguished between prostitution and other forms of sexual abuse.

In 2009, Joy Smith introduced Bill C-268, An Act to amend the Criminal Code (minimum sentence for offences involving trafficking of persons under the age of eighteen years). This bill amended Section 279.01 of Canada's Criminal Code to create a new offence for child trafficking with a five-year mandatory penalty. Bill C-268 received broad support from stakeholders concerned with human trafficking including law enforcement, victims' services, First Nations representatives, and religious and secular non-governmental organizations. MP Joy Smith worked with her colleagues across party lines to gain support for the legislation. On September 30, 2009, Bill C-268 received near unanimous support from Conservative, Liberal and NDP parties and was passed by the House of Commons, although opposed by the Bloc Québécois. On June 29, 2010, Bill C-268 was granted Royal Assent and became law. The successful passage of a private members bill is rare and it is only the 15th time in the history of the Canada that a private members bill amended the Criminal Code.

== Policy issues ==
Policy development around sex work in Canada is complex, divided across areas of jurisdictions and agencies. There is debate on how far a government can go in terms of intruding into private lives, and even whether prostitution is actually a problem or merely part of larger problems.

While the outdoor scene is the most visible and the one most likely to lead to complaints, there is an opinion that actions against them merely move the problem around rather than solve it, and that what harms there are in prostitution derive from public attitudes and inconsistent laws. The legal status has been described as "quasi-legal."

Debate comes from feminists, civil libertarians, social conservatives, politicians and law and order officials. The debates range over morality, constitutional rights and freedoms, and the fact that it is one of the few areas of consensual sexual activity that is still subject to legal control.

== Politics ==
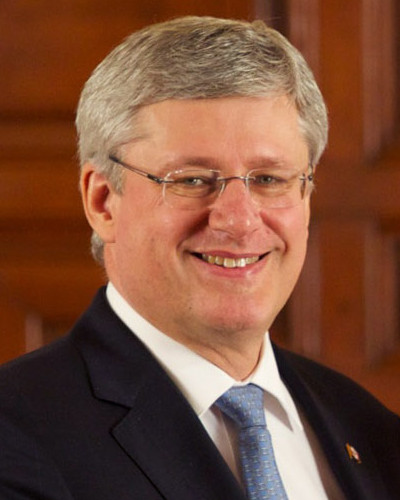
Stephen Harper

Various government committees and task forces have made many recommendations, very few of which have been implemented. The most recent was the 2006 report of the parliamentary subcommittee on solicitation which split on ideological party lines, with recommendations for decriminalization from the majority opposition parties, and for eradication by the minority government members.

The Harper Conservative government supported the prohibition of prostitution. Responding to the 2006 report, Prime Minister Stephen Harper stated, "in terms of legalization of prostitution I can just tell you that obviously that's something that this government doesn't favour." Justice Minister Rob Nicholson also stated, "we are not in the business of legalizing brothels, and we have no intention of changing any of the laws relating to prostitution in this country."

Such a move would likely be met with opposition from prohibitionist feminists organizations who are opposed to prostitution, which they consider to be a form of exploitation of women and of male dominance. They point out that in Sweden, Norway and Iceland it is illegal to pay for sex (the client commits a crime, but not the prostitute) and argue that countries with a high commitment to gender equality don't tolerate prostitution. On the other hand, other feminists and women's groups see the laws prohibiting sex work as oppressive of the labour of women and argue for their repeal as a basic human rights issue.

In October 2011, Conservative MP Joy Smith stated she was preparing legislation that would prohibit the purchase of sex. In response, Vancouver lawyer, Katrina Pacey of PIVOT has outlined the legal arguments against such an approach.

In September 2012, following the decision by the Supreme Court of Canada to allow sex workers in British Columbia to proceed with a constitutional challenge to the laws, the Justice Minister repeated the government's opposition to any change in the status quo.

In 2014, the City of Vancouver sent a second joint submission to the Senate Committee on Legal and Constitutional Affairs, written in partnership with the Vancouver Coastal Health Authority, expressing concern that the passing of Bill C-36 and the continued criminalization of sex work undermines the health and safety of sex workers, increases social exclusion, and pushes sex workers to work in more isolated and dangerous areas. Furthermore, the City of Vancouver made a public statement noting that “The City is concerned with the passing of Bill C-36, Protection of Communities and Exploited Persons Act, as research confirms that criminalization of sex work puts those involved in sex work at further risk of increased violence.”

In 2015, Justice Minister Jody Wilson-Raybould shared concerns regarding the passage of Bill C-36, stating: “It’s definitely something that we will be looking at, and [I] look forward to having more discussions and advising [about] our next steps,” and emphasizing that “the safety of the workers is fundamentally important."

In 2015, the City of Vancouver worked in partnership with the Vancouver Police Department to create Sex Work Response and Enforcement Guidelines that are centered on “balancing the needs of the community and the safety of sex workers” in order to ensure a balanced and coordinated approach across City departments when responding to issues relating to sex work. The City argues that the Guidelines promote “consistent, nondiscriminatory, and respectful treatment of anyone engaged in sex work when accessing City services or interacting with City employees,” and reflect their “ongoing commitment to address the issues of sex work from a human rights perspective to create safer and healthier communities for all.

== Public opinion ==
Most public opinion polls, which were first introduced in 1984, demonstrate a lack of understanding of the law, which could influence responses. The polls have also been frequently cited misleadingly.

A 2006 opinion poll showed that 68% of Canadians consider prostitution to be "immoral" (76% of women and 59% of men). In 2009, an online survey of a representative national sample of 1,003 Canadian adults conducted by Angus Reid Public Opinion showed that prostitution was considered "morally acceptable" by 42% of Canadians, but there were differences by age and gender. Young people were the most critical of prostitution: only 36% of those aged 18–34 considered prostitution "morally acceptable," compared to 45% of those aged 35–54, and 44% of those older than 55. Twenty-nine percent of women saw prostitution as acceptable, compared to 56% of men. Sixty percent of respondents supported allowing indoor work. Only 16% supported the status quo (where everything relating to prostitution except the sale of sex itself was illegal), 25% supported prohibition, while 50% supported decriminalization.

In 2012, 21% of respondents to an Ipsos Reid poll (1,004 adults between March 30 and April 1) strongly agreed and 44% somewhat agreed that prostitution in brothels should be legal, while 20% strongly disagreed and 15% somewhat disagreed (65% in favour of legalization and 35% against legalization). Seventy-five percent of men and 56 percent of women favoured legalization. All age groups and all regions favoured legalization, although there was regional variation.

Following introduction of amending legislation in June 2014, an Angus Reid poll (1,007 adults between June 6 and 7) showed that 45% thought buying sex should be legal, 45% that it should be illegal, and 11% were undecided. Fifty-one percent believed selling sex should be legal.

A 2020 Nanos poll found that 17% of Canadians strongly supported, 37% somewhat supported, 19% somewhat opposed, and 23% strongly opposed the decriminalization of prostitution. Notably, men were far more likely to support decriminalization (64%) than women (47%). An Ipsos poll later in 2020 found that 24% of Canadians thought that prostitution should be a legal profession like any other (akin to decriminalization or legalization), 46% preferred the decriminalization of the sale of sex but the criminalization of buying sex and pimping (similar to Canada's existing law), and 16% desired prostitution to be illegal in all circumstances. The same poll found that mean support for Canada's prostitution law on a scale from 1-7 was 5.2. Respondents were in favour of providing additional supports to women in prostitution, evenly distributed on whether they viewed prostitution as a form of male violence against women, and strongly opposed to family members paying for a sexual service.

== Sex trafficking and crime ==
As in other countries, debates around human trafficking for the purpose of sexual exploitation often dominate the larger debate on prostitution. These debates tend to be highly emotive and controversial, examples of which occurred following the Supreme Court's 2013 decision regarding the unconstitutional nature of Canada's prostitution laws. A psychotherapist stated, "I find it disturbing, disappointing, because it removes the only restraint on the men who are trolling for women. It's already an exceedingly dangerous work environment for the women. I now know that the police won't be patrolling or doing sting operations, so it's basically open season."

Karen Mykietka, president of the Alberta Avenue Community League, said to the media:

Anyone working in that industry is going to know that it's a free-for-all and nobody is going to be enforcing anything. I'm expecting we're probably going to see an increase in (prostitution) especially over the summer months, and that's not what the community likes to see on their streets.

=== Operation Northern Spotlight ===
Shortly following the decision of the Supreme Court, the police of at least 30 centres across Canada commenced a two-day investigation into human trafficking and sexual exploitation named Operation Northern Spotlight. The operation occurred on January 22 and 23, 2014, and focused on the hotel and motel establishments located on major arteries, as well as sex work venues. According to the Global Network of Sex Work Projects (NSWP), 180 police personnel interviewed 333 women and identified 25 suspected human traffickers.

According to press reports, one arrest and two suspected human traffickers were identified in Ontario. Police in York arrested and laid charges against a male individual and the names of two alleged human traffickers from Windsor were revealed as a result of the two-day blitz. The NSWP reported that police in the Peel and Durham regions of Ontario interviewed 53 women between 16 and 45 years old, and reported, "many of the women appear to be making their own decisions to participate for financial gain. Part or all of the proceeds from the sexual encounters were kept by their adult male controller or pimp." In the two regions, nine men were arrested and face 83 charges related to human trafficking, firearm offences, drug possession and child pornography. In Edmonton, police vice unit Detective Steven Horchuk stated that police will continue to focus on the clients of prostitution, in particular cases involving exploitive circumstances, but would no longer press charges related to communicating for the purpose of prostitution due to the Supreme Court's decision.

== Social movements ==
At the same time a number of movements arose either advocating the eradication of sex work as exploitation or for better protection of workers and decriminalization based on human rights. A 1983 committee recommended both stronger sanctions to deal with the visible spectrum of sex work, but also wider reforms. In 1983 the law was made technically gender neutral and provisions for prosecuting communication were widened in 1985, while special provisions for minors were enacted in 1988. None of this abated debate.

Several national women's groups, such as the Canadian Association of Sexual Assault Centers and the Native Women's Association of Canada, several provincial groups, including le Centre d'aide et de lutte contre les aggressions a charactere sexuelles local groups, including La Cles, Vancouver Rape Relief and Women's Shelter, Exploited Voices Educating, University Women's Club, The Aboriginal Women's Action Network, The Asian Women's Coalition Ending Prostitution, and the Vancouver Collective Against Sexual Exploitation, are advocating an abolitionist approach to policy. The Servants Anonymous Society is a nonprofit women's organization that provides aid to young women in exiting the sex industry.

In contrast, numerous sex-worker run and organized groups across the country continue to argue for full decriminalization of sex work in Canada, arguing that making it illegal to purchase sex creates harm to sex workers. Such organizations have often been in the forefront of court challenges to the laws criminalizing aspects of sex work. Organizations run by sex workers and advocating decriminalization include Sex Professionals of Canada (SPOC), which is run by Valerie Scott and Amy Lebovith; Pace (Vancouver); Peers (Victoria); Maggie's (Toronto); and Stella (Montreal). In response to Canada's prostitution laws, sex workers have been organizing themselves to advocate for what they consider their rights to engage in sex worth as a legitimate commercial activity in a safe and health manner, mostly since the 80s. The HIV-AIDS epidemic opened the door to harm reduction programs which contributed to the funding of sex workers' organizing, thus shifting the conversation from a solely moralized perspective to harm reduction perspective. Many authors and organizations argue that sex is here to stay and cannot be wiped out. Therefore, they suggest to decriminalize sex work and create a legal system that supports the health and safety of sex workers.

Canadian policy currently follows the abolitionist approach rather than the harm reduction and rights-based approach of improving the safety and rights of sex workers, despite many organization advocating that sex workers are workers and human beings that should be entitled to the same rights as others. Risky environments and sex work harms have been shown to amplify each other, and research has shown that the vulnerabilities and violence experienced by sex workers differ based on the environment in which sex work is conducted. Studies have shown that the creation of indoor spaces for sex work has been linked to increased safety, specifically, reduced violence and sexual assault, reduced health risks, and improved relationships with police.

== See also ==
- History of prostitution in Canada
- Prostitution law in Canada
- Prostitution law (worldwide)
- Paying for It
- She Has a Name
- Stella, l'amie de Maimie

== Bibliography ==
Government

- Report of the Royal Commission on the Status of Women (1970)
- Law Reform Commission Report on Sexual Offences (1978)
- Justice Committee report on street solicitation (1983)
- Badgley Committee on child prostitution (1984)
- P. Fraser et al., Pornography and Prostitution in Canada, vol II, Report of the Special Committee on Pornography and Prostitution (1985)
- Department of Justice. Street Prostitution: Assessing the Impact of the Law. Supply and Services Canada, Ottawa (1989)
- Brannigan, A. Knafla, L., and Levy, C. Street Prostitution: Assessing the Impact of the Law, Calgary, Regina and Winnipeg. Ottawa: Department of Justice (1989)
- Gemme, R., Payment, N. and Malenfant, L. Street Prostitution: Assessing the Impact of the Law, Montreal. Ottawa: Department of Justice (1989)
- Graves, F. Street Prostitution: Assessing the Impact of the Law, Halifax. Ottawa: Department of Justice (1989)
- Canadian Centre for Justice Statistics: Street Prostitution in Canada 1993, 1997
- Report of the Standing Committee on Justice (1990)
- Federal-Provincial-Territorial Working Group on Prostitution consultation paper Dealing with Prostitution in Canada (1995)
- Report of the Federal-Provincial-Territorial Working Group on Prostitution (1998)
- Lowman J. Identifying research gaps in the prostitution literature. Department of Justice 2001
- Youth Involvement in Prostitution: A Literature Review and Annotated Bibliography. Department of Justice 2002
- Prostitution in Canada - An Overview. Library of Parliament 2004
- Testimony of John Lowman to Solicitation sub-committee February 21 2005
- Prostitution in Canada: International Obligations, Federal Law, and Provincial and Municipal Jurisdiction. Library of the Parliament of Canada 2008
- Age of Consent to Sexual Activity. Department of Justice 2010
- Royal Canadian Mounted Police: Control or regulation of prostitution in Canada 2006

Published journal articles

- Janice D. McGinnis, "Whores and Worthies: Feminism and Prostitution, "Canadian Journal of Law and Society IX (1994)
- Daniel Sanfaçon, ed, "Law, Feminism and Sexuality," Special issues of the Canadian Journal of Law and Society IX,1 (1994).
- Lowman J. Violence and the Outlaw Status of (Street) Prostitution in Canada. Violence Against Women September 2000 vol. 6 no. 9 987-1011
- Wortley, Scot; Fischer, Benedikt; Webster, Cheryl (October 1, 2002). "Vice lessons: a survey of prostitution offenders enrolled in the Toronto John School Diversion Program". Canadian Journal of Criminology. Archived from the original on November 5, 2012 – via HighBeam Research.
- Emily van der Meulen, Elya Maria Durisin. Why Decriminalize?: How Canada's Municipal and Federal Regulations Increase Sex Workers' Vulnerability. Canadian Journal of Women and the Law Volume 20, Number 2, 2008

Books

- Emily van der Meulen, Elya Maria Durisin, and Victoria Love (eds.) Selling Sex: Experience, Advocacy and Research on Sex Work in Canada. Vancouver: UBC Press (2013)
- E. McLeod, Women Working: Prostitution Now (1982)
- G. Pheterson, ed, A Vindication of the Rights of Whores (1989)

History

- John P.S. McLaren, "Chasing the social evil: Moral fervour and the evolution of Canada's prostitution laws, 1867–1917, "Canadian Journal of Law and Society 1(1) 125-66 (1986)
- CBC: Ideas. Madeleine Blair: Nobody's Victim. Tuesday, April 23, 2013
- "Madeleine". University of Pennsylvania: A Celebration of Women Writers.
- Lesley Erickson. Westward Bound: Sex, Violence, the Law, and the Making of a Settler Society. UBC 2011
- Lindsey McMaster. Working Girls in the West: Representations of Wage Earning Women. UBC 2008
- Phillippa Levine. Prostitution, Race and Politics: Policing Venereal Disease in the British Empire.Psychology Press 2003
- Marianna Valverde. The Age of Light, Soap and Water: Moral Reform in English Canada 1885-1925. University of Toronto 2008

British Columbia

- Ricketts T, et al. History of Sex Work: Vancouver. Who we were - who we are. Simon Fraser University 2005
- Judge Wallace Craig: TRUDEAU CAUSED STREET PROSTITUTE PROBLEM. North Shore News April 27 2005
- Gangs, Girls and Sexual Exploitation in British Columbia. Community Consultation Paper. Abbotsford Youth Commission For Victim Services and Crime Prevention April 2010
- Stopping the sexual exploitation of children and youth / Ministry of Public Safety and Solicitor General, Victim Services & Crime Prevention. Vancouver, B.C. : Victim Services & Crime Prevention, Ministry of Public Safety and Solicitor General, 2010.
- Commercial sexual exploitation : creative ideas for working with children and youth. New Westminster, B.C. : Social Services and Community Safety Division, Justice Institute of B.C., 2002.

Media

- Pleasure and Pain: Inside the Sex Trade. The West Ender, July 31, 1997
- Decriminalize sex trade: Vancouver report. CBC June 13, 2006
- Vancouver sex-trade laws blasted: 'Once the lights go out here, man, it's brutal. It's crazy. Globe and Mail June 14, 2006
- Woman found dead near Edmonton linked to sex trade. CBC News, May 19, 2006
- New cases may be linked to Alberta sex-trade killings. CBC News May 17, 2006
- Suspect in death of sex-trade worker has history of violence. CBC News, May 10, 2006.

Analysis

- Daniel Henry: How the court's views on prostitution have evolved: The world's oldest profession, Canada's latest answer. CBC March 27 2012
- Not up to the challenge of change: An analysis of the report of the Subcommittee on Solicitation Laws. Canadian HIV/AIDS Legal Network Briefing Paper February 2007

Other

- Barrett M., et al. The International Encyclopedia of Sexuality: Canada.
- "Globalization & Migration". United Nations Platform for Action Committee: Women and the Economy. Archived from the original on May 14, 2011.
- Sylvia Davis and Martha Shaffer. Prostitution in Canada: The Invisible Menace or the Menace of Invisibility? 1994
- Government Reports. Commercial Sex Information Service 2004
- Prostitution. John Howard Society of Alberta 2001
