= Nikki Thomas =

Canadian sex worker activist

- Born: Nikki Thomas
- Citizenship: Canada
- Education: Bachelor's degree in political science, Honours degree in Sexual Diversity Studies, Honours degree in Psychology
- Alma mater: University of Toronto
- Occupation: Prostitute
- Years active: 2007–2013
- Organization: Sex Professionals of Canada
- Known for: Opposing Canadian laws against prostitution
- Website: www.msnikkithomas.com

Nikki Thomas is the former executive director of Sex Professionals of Canada.

== Education ==
She has three academic degrees from the University of Toronto in political science, sexual diversity studies and psychology. She entered the sex industry in 2007 in order to make enough money to pay for tuition.

== Activism ==
In Bedford v. Canada, Thomas supported the decision to legalize brothels, saying that "any form of criminalization pushes the industry underground and gives opportunities to predators." She made reference to Robert Pickton murdering of several prostitutes, and said that Pickton would not have been able to murder these prostitutes if the law allowed prostitutes to work in escort agencies or red-light districts where they could require their clients to show identification. Former prostitute Natasha Falle responded that, even if such prostitution establishments were legalized, these prostitutes would never have been allowed to work in such places because desperate situations led these women to prostitution, just as will continue to be the case for many other women even if the laws change.

When the Court of Appeal for Ontario struck down several prostitution-related laws as part of Bedford v. Canada, Thomas said that there was now a need for sex workers to persuade the public that the new state of affairs was nothing to fear, saying, "We are not going to have fire and brimstone and sex workers raining down from the sky." She also said that there is still a need to convince Canadians that sex workers are not subhuman. She expressed her disappointment that the courts upheld the law against communicating for the purposes of prostitution.

== Controversy ==
In a 2011 interview with CTV Two Alberta, Thomas claimed to be a psychologist, but the television channel later discovered that Thomas was not registered as a psychologist in Alberta or in Ontario, where she lives. However, Thomas was referring to her education in psychology, and has never claimed to have been a practising psychologist in any capacity, professional or otherwise.
