= Ron Marzel =

Canadian lawyer

Ron Marzel is a Canadian lawyer from Toronto. His specialty is opposing Canada's cannabis laws. He also represents landlords. In 2008, he represented Dispensing With Care, a coalition that was opposing restrictions on the Ontario Drug Benefits Plan. Alan Young, another Toronto-based lawyer, advised Marzel in this case. In 2010, he was the defence lawyer for Neev Tapiero, a member of Cannabis As Living Medicine (CALM). The case had been initiated by a police raid on CALM's headquarters, which Marzel called "a totally inappropriate response to an organization that is seeking legitimization to help sick people." In a Facebook post, Marzel promised to seek court "condemnation" on the police raid and voiced his opposition to the "dysfunctional medical marijuana program" run by Health Canada. In Bedford v. Canada, Marzel sought to have Canada's anti-prostitution laws declared unconstitutional, saying that "there are consenting adults who want to go into" prostitution. Natasha Falle, a former prostitute, was angered by this statement, responding that 97% of prostitutes are not engaging in prostitution by choice, and that "the voices of the overwhelming majority of women who want to get out of prostitution are being drowned out by a vocal few." In 2013, Marzel served as the defence lawyer for Maxim Popovitch, a medical cannabis seller and grower.
