= Wendy Babcock =

Canadian sex worker activist

- Born: May 29, 1979; Toronto, Ontario, Canada
- Died: August 9, 2011 (aged 32)
- Occupations: Prostitute, sex work activist

Wendy Babcock (May 29, 1979 – August 9, 2011) was a Canadian activist for the rights of sex workers. Born in the city of Toronto, Babcock became a sex worker at the age of 15. From 2004 to 2007 she was a key member of Sex Professionals of Canada, an advocacy group whose main objective is to promote the rights of sex workers and the decriminalization of sex work in Canada.

Babcock was found dead at her home on August 9, 2011, from an accidental overdose; foul play was not suspected. At the time of her death, she was at work on a memoir, to be released in 2013 to coincide with her graduation from law school.

== Work ==
Babcock chaired the Bad Date Coalition of Toronto, a group that produces a monthly Bad Date Book which publishes reports of violent acts committed against sex workers, including details of the attacker. In 2007, she testified in the Ontario Superior Court in the case of R. v. Bedford, one of Alan Young's constitutional challenges to decriminalize sex work. The case was appealed to the Supreme Court of Canada in 2007.

Babcock co-initiated a partnership with Toronto Police Services to ensure sex workers can report assault without fear of persecution or prosecution, and being a member of the advisory group to the Special Victims Unit. Other projects that Babcock helped to create include Safer Stroll Outreach Project, Regent Park Community Health Centre's Sex Worker Drop In, the Health Bus Sex Workers Stop and Wen-Do safety training for sex workers.

Babcock took a leave of absence from sex work after her friend and co-worker Lien Pham was murdered on October 13, 2003. In 2002–2003 Babcock began sex worker advocacy while working for Maggie's, a peer-run organization for sex workers. From 2003 to 2010, Babcock worked at Street Health as a harm reduction worker.

In 2008, Babcock received the Inaugural Public Health Champion Award for her work with sex workers. The award recognizes an individual who has made outstanding contributions to protecting and promoting the health of Toronto's residents.

In 2009, Babcock began to pursue a J.D. degree at Osgoode Hall Law School. She joined Lover Magazine (a women's sexuality magazine) in 2011 as a writer on sex work issues.

=== Films ===
Babcock participated in three films: Sluts: The Documentary, the 2007 documentary Where I Stand, and the 2010 short film Every Ho I Know Says So. Babcock also appeared on television including the CBC's Connect with Mark Kelley twice, and Global TV's 16:9 The Bigger Picture. Babcock can also be seen in a video on a website for Eva's Phoenix homeless shelter, where she lived during her youth.

Babcock worked as a consultant to Kat Dennings for her role as a sex worker in the 2009 film Defendor.
