= Abdellah Ouzghar =

Abdellah Ouzghar is a joint citizen of Canada and Morocco, who was arrested in Canada shortly after the September 11, 2001 attacks, on suspicion of ties to terrorist organizations. A man in Taiwan had been found to be using Ouzghar's passport, which had been doctored. France charged Ouzghar with "forgery, uttering a forged document and two related conspiracy charges".

== Life ==
A truck driver by trade, Ouzghar claims that he was initially approached at his Montreal home in 1996, and asked to work as a spy for Canadian Security Intelligence Service (CSIS), but refused on religious grounds - leading to an attempt to "set him up" by the intelligence service. CSIS admits having interviewed him at the time, but denies that they were trying to recruit him. CSIS claims he maintained suspicious connections to Fateh Kamel, and agent Mike Pavlovic questioned him again on September 20, 2001.

== Arrest and release ==
John Norris, Ouzghar's lawyer, argues that even if Ouzghar was involved in forging a passport, that crime would have occurred in Canada, and should be prosecuted in Canada. His extradition hearing was told how Zoheir Choulah's conviction in France showed a number of phone calls between Choulah and Ouzghar while the latter was living in Montreal.

While facing extradition, Ouzghar became a computer technician. During the raid on his house, a videotape was seized which was later said to "sing the praises of jihad".

Justice Susan Himel, who took up responsibility for Ouzghar's case when an earlier judge bowed out due to ill-health, made a ruling on January 12, 2007, stating that "...there was insufficient evidence to show Ouzghar was a member of a terrorist group."

However, the extradition battle with France continued, and in June 2009, Ouzghar was handed over to French authorities to begin his prison term for passport forgery.
