= Prostitution Reference =

Reference re ss. 193 & 195.1(1)(c) of the Criminal Code (Man.)
- Supreme Court of Canada

Hearing: December 1, 2, 1988 Judgment: May 31, 1990
- Citations: [1990] 1 SCR 1123
- Ruling: Section 193 of the Criminal Code of Canada is not inconsistent with section 2(b) of the Canadian Charter of Rights and Freedoms. Section 195.1(1)(c) of the Code is inconsistent with s. 2(b) of the Charter but is justifiable under section 1 of the Charter. Sections 193 and 195.1(1)(c), separately or in combination, are not inconsistent with section 7 of the Charter.

Court membership
- Chief Justice: Brian Dickson; Puisne Justices: William McIntyre, Antonio Lamer, Bertha Wilson, Gérard La Forest, Claire L'Heureux-Dubé, John Sopinka, Charles Gonthier, Peter Cory

Reasons given
- Majority: Dickson CJ, joined by La Forest and Sopinka JJ
- Concurrence: Lamer J
- Dissent: Wilson J, joined by L'Heureux-Dubé J
- McIntyre J took no part in the consideration or decision of the case.

Reference re ss. 193 & 195.1(1)(c) of the Criminal Code (Man.) [1990] 1 S.C.R. 1123, commonly known as the Prostitution Reference, is a decision of the Supreme Court of Canada on the right to freedom of expression under section 2(b) of the Canadian Charter of Rights and Freedoms, and on prostitution in Canada. Manitoba's Appeal Court had ruled the legislation violated the guarantee of freedom of expression in the Charter of Rights and Freedoms, by constraining communication in relation to legal activity (R. v. Skinner (1987), 35 C.C.C. (3d) 203). The case was referred to the Supreme court.

The Supreme Court held that the criminal code provision that prohibited communication for the purpose of engaging in prostitution was in violation of the right to freedom of expression; however, it could be justified under section 1 of the Charter, and so it was upheld.

The majority, with both women dissenting, found that the purpose of eliminating prostitution was a valid goal and that the provision was rationally connected and proportional to that goal. Accordingly, the provision was upheld.

The justification was set out in three stages:

1. The court must first characterize the objective of the law (a remedy for solicitation in public places and the eradication of social nuisance from the public display of the sale of sex). This was constructed as restricted to taking prostitution off the streets and out of public view. In this respect, Dickson disagreed with the opinion of another justice that the legislative objective addressed the broader questions of the exploitation, degradation and subordination of women.
2. The court must assess the proportionality of the legislation to the objectives; in particular any infringement of rights must be the minimum to achieve this. It was held the provisions were not unduly intrusive.
3. The court must determine if the effects of the law so infringe a protected right that it outweighs the objective. It was held that the curtailment of street solicitation was in keeping with the interests of society, for its nuisance‑related aspects.

The decision was later upheld in Canada (AG) v Bedford.

== See also ==
- List of Supreme Court of Canada cases (Dickson Court)
- Prostitution law in Canada
