= Canada (AG) v Bedford =

- Supreme Court of Canada

Hearing: 13 June 2013 Judgment: 20 December 2013
- Citations: 2013 SCC 72, [2013] 3 SCR 1101
- Docket No.: 34788
- Prior history: APPEALS and CROSS‑APPEAL from Canada (Attorney General) v. Bedford, 2012 ONCA 186 (26 March 2012), affirming in part Bedford v. Canada, 2010 ONSC 4264 (28 September 2010).
- Ruling: Appeals dismissed and cross‑appeal allowed.

Holding
- ss. 210, 212(1)(j) and 213(1)(c) of the Criminal Code do not pass Charter muster, as they infringe the s. 7 rights of prostitutes by depriving them of security of the person in a manner that is not in accordance with the principles of fundamental justice.

Court membership
- Chief Justice: Beverley McLachlin
- Puisne Justices: Louis LeBel, Morris Fish, Rosalie Abella, Marshall Rothstein, Thomas Cromwell, Michael Moldaver, Andromache Karakatsanis, Richard Wagner

Reasons given
- Unanimous reasons by: McLachlin CJ

Canada (AG) v Bedford, [2013] 3 SCR 1101, 2013 SCC 72, is a decision of the Supreme Court of Canada on the Canadian law of sex work. The applicants, Terri-Jean Bedford, Amy Lebovitch and Valerie Scott, argued that Canada's prostitution laws were unconstitutional. The Criminal Code included a number of provisions, such as outlawing public communication for the purposes of prostitution, operating a bawdy house or living off of the avails of prostitution, even though prostitution itself was legal.

The applicants argued that the laws deprive sex workers of their right to security by forcing them to work secretly. In 2012, the Court of Appeal for Ontario ruled that some, but not all, of these prohibitions violated the Canadian Charter of Rights and Freedoms and were unconstitutional. The Supreme Court of Canada ruled in a 9–0 decision on December 20, 2013, that all of these laws are unconstitutional, although it delayed the striking down of the laws by one year to allow Parliament to update the laws in accordance with the ruling.

Parliament responded to Bedford by enacting the Protection of Communities and Exploited Persons Act in 2014, which criminalized the commercial exchange of sex for the first time in Canadian history. The new law — based on the Nordic model — immunizes sex workers from prosecution and arrest for selling their own services, but targets the purchase of sex, as well as third parties who benefit from it.

The term "sex work" is used interchangeably with "prostitution" in this article, in accordance with the World Health Organization (WHO 2001; WHO 2005) and the United Nations (UN 2006; UNAIDS 2002).

== Background ==
While sex work is legal in Canada, most activities related to sex work are illegal. Prohibitions at the time the Bedford case was initiated included:

- operating common bawdy-houses. This prohibited sex workers from offering their services out of fixed indoor locations such as brothels, or even their own homes.
- living on the avails of prostitution. This prohibited anyone, including but not limited to pimps, from profiting from another’s prostitution.
- communicating for the purpose of prostitution in public. This prohibited sex workers from offering their services in public, and particularly on the streets.

Many of these prohibitions were found constitutional by the Supreme Court of Canada in 1990 in the Prostitution Reference. In 2007, court proceedings began in Ontario to re-challenge the constitutionality of these prohibitions, on the basis that they created significant harm to sex workers.

== Applicants ==
The three applicants all work or worked in the sex trade and Amy Lebovitch and Valerie Scott are members of Sex Professionals of Canada (SPOC), an organization which campaigns for the rights of sex workers and the full decriminalization of prostitution.

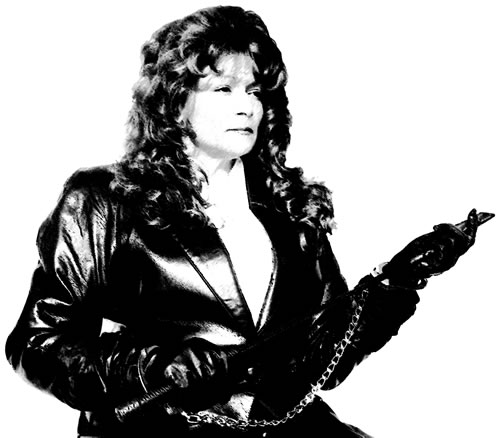
Terri-Jean Bedford in her signature attire

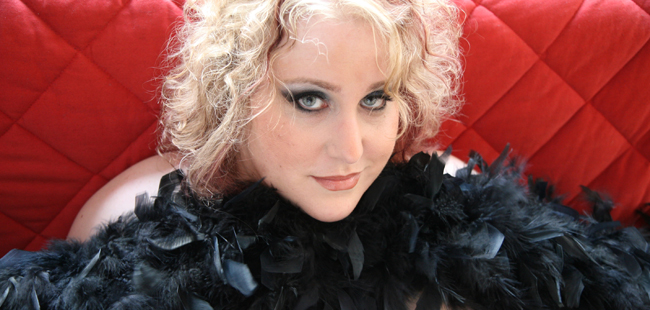
Amy Lebovitch

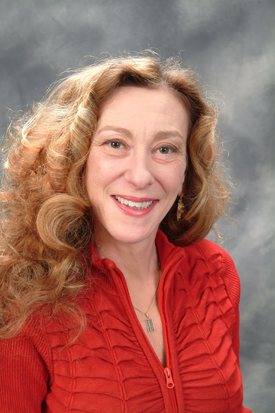
Valerie Scott

=== Terri-Jean Bedford ===
Terri-Jean Bedford, born 15 October 1959, was formerly a prostitute and now works as a professional dominatrix. Bedford formerly operated an S&M dungeon in Thornhill, Ontario, called Madame de Sade's House of Erotica, but dubbed the Bondage Bungalow by the press. In 1994 she was charged with operating a bawdy house, and was convicted in 1999. Throughout the Superior Court trial, Bedford's appearance was notable, dressing all in leather and always appearing with a black leather riding crop.

=== Amy Lebovitch ===
Amy Lebovitch, born 24 January 1979, has worked in the sex industry since she was 18. She has worked on the street, indoors (independently and with an agency) and in a fetish house. She has also studied criminology and psychology at the University of Ottawa and social work at Ryerson University (now Toronto Metropolitan University) in Toronto. Since 2012, she works as a community based researcher.

=== Valerie Scott ===
Valerie Scott, born 9 April 1958, entered the sex trade when she was 24. She worked on the street, independent indoor, escort and in massage parlours. Scott became an activist in 1985 when she joined SPOC (known as the Canadian Organization for the Rights of Prostitutes at the time). She served as the executive director of SPOC from 2004 to 2011 and is now SPOC's Legal Coordinator. For the past 27 years, Scott has spoken at numerous parliamentary committees, universities, community organizations and to the media about the need for decriminalization.

== Trial ==
The trial took place in Toronto over seven days in October 2009 in the Ontario Superior Court of Justice. The applicants were represented by Alan Young, a professor of law at Osgoode Hall Law School. Young stated that he brought the challenge forward because the state of the law in Canada made it legal to engage in the act of prostitution, but illegal to be indoors, hire bodyguards or help and to screen clients. One witness, Professor John Lowman of Simon Fraser University, provided evidence that working outside is more dangerous for sexworkers, raising the example of serial-killer Robert Pickton who preyed on streetwalkers. And another witness, Professor Ronald Weitzer (of George Washington University) provided further evidence of indoor prostitution being safer than street solicitation.

The federal and provincial governments argued that sex work is exploitative and harmful to the community. The federal government called experts such as Dr. Janice Raymond of the Coalition Against Trafficking in Women and Dr. Melissa Farley of Prostitution Research and Education. Witnesses for the Crown argued that indoor prostitution is no less risky than outdoor prostitution and that prostitution in any form is inherently dangerous. In addition to the Attorney General of Ontario, other parties granted intervenor status in the case included the Catholic Civil Rights League, the Christian Legal Fellowship and REAL Women of Canada. These interveners filed a joint submission stating that a majority of Canadians hold sex work to be immoral and that 80% of Canadians belong to religions supporting this view.

=== Decision ===
On September 28, 2010, Justice Susan Himel issued her decision after one year of deliberation. She struck down Canada's prostitution laws, specifically sections 210, 212(1)(j) and 213(1)(c). An Angus Reid poll shortly after the decision found 49% of Canadians approved of the decision of Justice Himel, and 34% were opposed; however, there was considerable variation by age, gender and province.

== Court of Appeal for Ontario ==
=== Temporary stay ===
Justice Himel originally allowed a stay of 30 days to permit appeal. Justice Minister Rob Nicholson stated that the Federal Government would appeal the court ruling and seek a stay pending that decision. The Ontario Government, which had intervenor status in the case, supported the appeal and did not seek any Parliamentary discussion of the state of the prostitution laws in Canada.

On October 15, a further stay effective till November 27 was granted to allow the Justice Department to prepare an appeal, and, on November 22, the Government sought a further stay in the court of appeal, claiming dire consequences if the decision was applied. Mr Justice Marc Rosenberg rebuked the Crown for overstating the consequences of allowing the decision to stand. Judgment was reserved, the parties agreeing to extend the stay until judgment was delivered. On December 2, the court granted an extension of the stay until April 2011, on the grounds of preserving the status quo and that the full appeal should have been heard by then.

In March 2011, the Government filed its brief and applied for and obtained a further stay till the hearing of the appeal in June 2011. They also asked for a further 18-month stay should the appeal be unsuccessful. In its brief the Justice Department made a number of arguments in addition to claims of errors in law: prostitution is inherently harmful, Parliament enacted the provisions to discourage this activity, and the impugned provisions met the stated objectives, were not arbitrary or overbroad, and therefore should stand. Furthermore, it challenged the legal standing of two of the three applicants. The claims that the stated harms were due to sex workers flouting the law, and that there was not a duty of protection to sex workers, since they voluntarily entered a dangerous occupation, were the ones picked up by the media.

=== Interveners ===
Eight additional parties, including the Providing Alternatives Counselling and Education (PACE) Society, the Canadian Civil Liberties Association, the British Columbia Civil Liberties Association, the Canadian HIV/AIDS Legal Network and the Prostitutes of Ottawa/Gatineau Work, Educate and Resist (POWER), were granted intervenor status as amici curiae, however Maggie's, a sex worker organization was denied this on March 16, since they sought to raise new constitutional issues under section 15. They were however invited to join one of the existing groups.

=== Hearing ===
The appeal was heard by five members of the Court of Appeal for Ontario from 13–16 June 2011. The panel further extended the stay pending their verdict.

=== Decision ===
On March 26, 2012 the Court of Appeal struck down the bawdy house provisions as unconstitutional and amended the Criminal Code provisions to clarify that the prohibition on living on the avails of prostitution (pimping) applies only to those who do so "in circumstances of exploitation." However, the Crown's appeal of the communicating for the purposes of prostitution was successful, as the Court of Appeal ruled this law does not violate the prostitutes’ Section 7 rights and is a reasonable limit on the right to expression. This means street prostitution, where prostitutes solicit business in public, still remains effectively illegal.

The Court of Appeal stayed the effect of their ruling on the law against operating a common bawdy-house for 12 months to give Parliament an opportunity to amend the law in a manner that does not infringe the Charter.

=== Debate ===
In Bedford v. Canada, lawyer Ron Marzel supported the striking down of Canada's anti-prostitution laws as unconstitutional, saying that "there are consenting adults who want to go into" prostitution. Natasha Falle, a former prostitute who helped the Crown formulate their appeal of the decision of the Ontario Superior Court of Justice, was angered by this statement by Marzel, responding that 97% of prostitutes are not engaging in prostitution by choice, and that "the voices of the overwhelming majority of women who want to get out of prostitution are being drowned out by a vocal few."

In a television discussion of Bedford v. Canada, Nikki Thomas, executive director of Sex Professionals of Canada, made reference to Robert Pickton, who murdered several sex workers, and said that the deaths could have been avoided if sex work was permitted to occur in escort agencies or red-light districts, where clients can be asked to show identification. However, Falle asserted that the sex workers in question would never have been allowed to work in such establishments because desperate situations led these women to prostitution and referred to Pickton's victims as "easy access". Falle then further claimed that sex workers in such circumstances will continue to exist even if the laws change.

When asked by the host of the program if all of the problems of Canadian sex workers would be resolved following the legislation change, Thomas replied:

Absolutely not. That was not something that I would ever suggest. Because if the person engaging in sex work is not doing so from a position of personal choice, if they're doing so out of desperation, then they're automatically going to be in a position where exploitation is possible, and that's not something that we would envision. I'm not going to pretend that decriminalisation will fix everything, but I can tell you that it will fix certain things and it will allow those who do it by choice to do so in a more safe manner. And it will also allow those who do so from an exploited situation to do so in a way that keeps them safe, until they can get to a point where they can either decide to move on to something else, or they can do so in a different setting where they don't feel nearly as exploited as before.

To determine whether women engage in prostitution by choice, Falle advised that statistics and disclosures from "survivors and victims of the sex trade" should be referred to rather than asking individual women currently engaged in sex work. Falle explained that asking a prostitute how they feel about sex work is like "asking a battered woman 'Do you like what you're doing? Do you want to leave your abuser?' and most will tell you they don't have an answer or they'll tell you 'No'." Falle stated that she believes that sex workers "become sucked into the sex trade and become very conditioned" within a short period of time. Falle expressed her opinion that women enter the sex industry because of "unresolved personal issues," such as abuse or trauma, and that the "vast majority" of women in the sex industry are not participants by choice.

== At the Supreme Court of Canada ==
On Friday, December 20, 2013, the Supreme Court of Canada struck down Canada's remaining prostitution laws, finding that bans on street soliciting, brothels and people living off the avails of prostitution create severe dangers for vulnerable women. Writing for a unanimous court, Chief Justice Beverly McLachlin opined that "Parliament has the power to regulate against nuisances, but not at the cost of the health, safety and lives of prostitutes."

In a footnote, the Court gave its rationale for arriving at its decision:

The focus is on security of the person, not liberty, for three reasons. First, the Prostitution Reference decided that the communicating and bawdy-house provisions engage liberty, and it is binding on this point. The security of the person argument is a novel issue and an important reason why the application judge was able to revisit the Prostitution Reference. Second, it is not clear that any of the applicants’ personal liberty interests are engaged by the living on the avails provision; rather, they have pleaded that they fear that it could apply to their employees or their loved ones. Lastly, it seems to me that the real gravamen of the complaint is not that breaking the law engages the applicants’ liberty, but rather that compliance with the laws infringes the applicants’ security of the person.

The various Attorneys General framed their Charter arguments only within the framework of s. 7, so the Court found it unnecessary to conduct a full s.1 analysis, but a minimal analysis found that the provisions could not be saved under it.

== Impact ==
=== Legal and constitutional ===
Apart from the subject matter in dispute, Bedford extended s.7 significantly in the relatively new principles of arbitrariness, overbreadth, and gross disproportionality:

- Arbitrariness asks whether there is a direct connection between the purpose of the law and the impugned effect on the individual, in the sense that the effect on the individual bears some relation to the law’s purpose.
- Overbreadth deals with a law that is so broad in scope that it includes some conduct that bears no relation to its purpose. In this sense, the law is arbitrary in part.
- Arbitrariness and overbreadth, previously explored in Chaoulli v. Quebec (Attorney General) have been clarified to declare that the effect of a law may be inconsistent with the objective, but the evidence must ultimately show that there is no connection between the effect and purpose of the law, causing the law to violate basic norms.
- Gross disproportionality asks whether the law’s effects on life, liberty or security of the person are so grossly disproportionate to its purposes that they cannot rationally be supported. Under s. 7 of the Charter, it does not consider the beneficial effects of the law for society — it balances the negative effect on the individual against the purpose of the law, not against societal benefit that might flow from the law.

In that regard, s. 212(1)(j) was found to be overbroad, and s. 210 and s. 213(1)(c) were found to be grossly disproportionate. While the rulings of the lower courts on the first two provisions were sustained, the Court found that the Court of Appeal's gross disproportionality analysis was "problematic", and its discussion of that suggests that the Court treats prostitution not as a social harm, but as a mere nuisance, which may heavily influence the approach that Parliament may take following the decision.

Bedford also builds on the Court's previous decision in Canada (AG) v PHS Community Services Society (where drug addiction was found to be an illness rather than a matter of personal choice). By also mentioning that it might have rejected any claim of a "positive right to vocational safety," the Court maintained its reluctance to protect positive rights under s. 7, previously expressed in cases such as Gosselin v. Quebec (Attorney General).

It has been noted that Bedford opens up the "troubling possibility that violations of section 7 may be easier to justify than they have ever been." However, Carter v Canada (AG) has subsequently suggested that "in some [s. 7] situations the state may be able to show that the public good ... justifies depriving an individual of life, liberty or security of the person under s. 1 of the Charter. More particularly, in cases such as this where the competing societal interests are themselves protected under the Charter, a restriction on s. 7 rights may in the end be found to be proportionate to its objective." The Ontario Court of Appeal has subsequently held that safety regulations under that province's Highway Traffic Act had s. 1 justification, but expressed discomfort about such provisions falling within the scope of s. 7.

=== Debate ===
A panel discussion entitled "After Bedford v. Canada: What next for regulating sex work in Canada?" was held at Toronto's University College, Toronto on January 24, 2014. Panellists included Brenda Cossman, a law professor at University of Toronto and head of the Bonham Centre for Sexual Diversity Studies, Katrina Pacey, litigation director of Vancouver's Pivot Legal Society, and Kim Pate, of the Canadian Association of Elizabeth Fry Societies. Participants, which included over 100 audience members, discussed the legal landscape in the aftermath of the Supreme Court decision and Cossman expressed concerns over the decision, while also calling the decision "smart and courageous":

It casts sex work into the language of harm. It reflects the legal arguments that were made. It reflects the lower court decisions, where the focus was on how the law harms a vulnerable at-risk group ... but there's nothing in the decision about sexual morality. There's nothing in this decision about sexual autonomy. There's nothing in the decision about decriminalizing prostitution.

Pacey spoke of her experience speaking with sex workers based in Vancouver's Downtown East Side:

They worry about being caught by police so they move further down the road. Clients wave them towards a dark alley, so sex workers can't make quick assessments about safety, if the client is a 'bad date', has a gun or is drunk. They're telling me they want access to the legislation that protects them, but criminalization of the sex trade stands in the way of that access.

In an interview with the CBC News media outlet, published on February 7, 2014, Scott expressed serious concerns about the 12-month time frame that the government has been given to revise the laws, as sex workers have not been involved in the decision-making process and what has become known as the "Nordic model" is being considered by the Canadian government, a model that, according to Cossman, created the problems that Canadian sex workers are seeking to avoid. The model's primary feature is the criminalization of sex worker clients, rather than the workers themselves. Scott explained further, citing New Zealand as an exemplary model:

Do not rewrite the laws. They did not rewrite the same sex marriage law, they did not rewrite the abortion law. But they know that we're not a great huge amount of people — and we're politically not a great cause to get behind in terms of vote-getting. The women who are doing the work should be the ones that are able to obtain a licence. We should be able to rent a place together and work together. That's what safety is, being in proximity with each other.

Cossman has expressed concern over the consideration of the Nordic model, as constitutional challenges will need to recommence if it is adopted. Scott stated: "It means that we will have to spend the next 10 years massing evidence of robberies, beatings, rapes and murders. How many bodies have to pile up?"

=== Operation Northern Spotlight ===
Shortly following the decision of the Supreme Court, the police of 30 centres across Canada, including Halifax Regional Municipality, Saint John and Edmonton, commenced a two-day investigation into human trafficking and sexual exploitation named Operation Northern Spotlight. The operation, led by the Integrated Vice Unit in Halifax, occurred on January 22 and 23, 2014 and focused on the hotel and motel establishments located on major arteries, as well as sex work venues. According to the Global Network of Sex Work Projects (NSWP), 180 police personnel interviewed 333 women, and identified 25 suspected human traffickers.

According to press reports, one arrest and two suspected human traffickers were identified in Ontario; police in York arrested and laid charges against a male individual and the names of two alleged human traffickers from Windsor were revealed as a result of the two-day blitz. The NSWP reported that police in the Peel and Durham regions of Ontario interviewed 53 women between 16 and 45 years old, and reported: "Many of the women appear to be making their own decisions to participate for financial gain. Part or all of the proceeds from the sexual encounters were kept by their adult male controller or pimp." In the two regions, nine men were arrested and face 83 charges related to human trafficking, firearm offences, drug possession and child pornography. In Edmonton, police vice unit Detective Steven Horchuk stated that police will continue to focus on the clients of prostitution, in particular cases involving exploitive circumstances, but would no longer press charges related to communicating for the purpose of prostitution due to the Supreme Court's decision.

== Aftermath ==
In response to Bedford, Parliament enacted Bill C-36, the Protection of Communities and Exploited Persons Act, in 2014. The Act created a new framework regulating prostitution, based on the Nordic model. It criminalizes the purchase of sexual services, directly outlawing sex work for the first time in Canadian history, and also targets activities that facilitate prostitution, such as advertising and materially benefitting from it. Consistent with the Nordic model, it provides legal immunity to sex workers for selling and advertising their own services. The Act also contains exceptions to address the Court's concerns with the past living off the avails offence. For example, by allowing third parties to charge for "proportional" services to sex workers in certain circumstances, like those relating to security.

== See also ==
- List of Supreme Court of Canada cases (McLachlin Court)
- Prostitution in Canada
- Prostitution law in Canada

== Bibliography ==
- "Canada (Attorney General) v. Bedford - Supreme Court Judgment [2013] 3 SCR 1101". Supreme Court of Canada. 20 December 2013.
