= Social conservatism in Canada =

Social conservatism in Canada represents conservative positions on issues of family, sexuality and morality. In the European and North American context, social conservatives believe in natural law as well as traditional family values and policies. In Canada's modern context, social conservatism also includes pro-life values on abortion and euthanasia.

== Background ==
Canada's political and social history stems from long established ties to conservative institutions and ideals. The major founding institutions of pre-Confederation Canada, both in English and French Canada, were religious organizations. Groups such as the Jesuits in Quebec and various Anglican missions in Ontario gave rise to the founding educational, political and social hierarchies of the ensuing centuries. The Catholic Church's control and influence in Quebec was insurmountable for nearly three centuries prior to the Quiet Revolution. Similarly, British Toryism and Protestant puritanical ideals in Ontario were so deeply entrenched after the migration of conservative United Empire Loyalists fleeing the American Revolution that laws regarding alcohol, tobacco sales and gambling are still strictly regulated in Ontario. At the turn of the 20th century, Toronto had strict moralistic by-laws (which included a ban on Sunday sports into the 1950s as well as Sunday shopping into the 1980s). To this day, Ontario continues to have well-regulated alcohol, with provinces having gained power over alcohol and gambling in 1986.

The extent to which social conservatism was embedded in the 19th and 20th centuries is evidenced by the power and influence of Tory factions in pre-Confederation Canada, such as the Family Compact and the Chateau Clique, the prominence of the Conservative Party of Canada after Confederation and the pronounced stifling of left-leaning or progressive views until after the Second World War. Even to this day, social conservatism in Canada still has support outside such major urban centres in Canada as Toronto, Montreal and Vancouver.

The prominence of social conservatism is not just limited to United Empire Loyalists settling in Ontario in the 1790s and the subsequent formation of the Family Compact. Further solidification occurred during the mid 1800s with Mennonites and Doukhobors from Eastern Europe settling in the prairies to establish agrarian communities. Some of these communities still exist to this day as small colonies.

Furthermore, Mormon migration to Alberta and British Columbia resulted in small but prominent Mormon communities along the border, such as Bountiful and Cardston. This occurred roughly around the same time as the East European influx into the prairies.

By the 1890s, three different Social Conservative movements emerged simultaneously in the United States, with their influence bleeding over into Canada. This included Victorian Moralism, the Third Great Awakening, and Conservative Holiness. All of these began the first major political entry of social conservatism, as opposed to the private social conservatism prevalent among the population. These movements would see temporary bans on alcohol in the 1920s.

By the 1930s, two prominent parties began espousing socially conservative policies in Western Canada, tied to political concerns of the time. The left wing CCF party that integrated social gospel, and the right wing Social Credit party that preached Christian social credit.

Ontario had its share of fundamentalist Christian groups as well. Amish communities established themselves in Ontario in the 1890s, as well as other Anabaptists, such as the Conservative Mennonites that began around 1956 in Ontario. Christian groups began becoming organized by the Diefenbaker era, such as the Canadian Southern Baptist Conference in 1957 and the Evangelical Fellowship of Canada in 1964.

In modern times, however, social conservatism has not been as influential in Canada as in the past, and has been in constant decline. The main reason is that right-wing, neoliberal politics as promoted by leaders such as former Prime Minister Stephen Harper have not been linked to moral or social conservatism. That is, there is no large political party behind it, and social conservatives have divided their votes.

However, social conservatives still consist of a small contingent within Canada. In recent times, they have still shown their active political nature, such as during the 2014 neo-abolitionist ban on prostitution in Canada.

Social conservatives demand a return to traditional morality and social mores, often through civil law or regulation. Social change away from traditional values is generally regarded as suspect, while social values based on tradition are generally regarded as tried, tested and true. It is a view commonly associated with religious conservatives, particularly Evangelicals or conservative Roman Catholics.

Some historic examples include William Horace Temple and William Aberhart. Examples of more recent socially conservative Canadians include former leader of the Conservative Party of Canada Andrew Scheer, as well as Stockwell Day. Some notable premiers in this regard include Bill Vander Zalm, Ernest Manning, and Maurice Duplessis.

Socially conservative values do not necessarily coincide with those of right-wing fiscal conservatism. Fiscally left-leaning politicians may embrace socially conservative values.

== Political impact ==
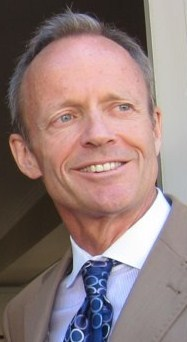
Stockwell Day

In modern Canadian politics, social conservatives often felt that they were being sidelined by officials in the Progressive Conservative Party of Canada. Many of them felt shunned by a party that was largely led and run by Red Tories for the last half of the twentieth century. Many eventually made their political home with the Reform Party of Canada and its forerunner the Social Credit Party of Canada. Despite Reform leader Preston Manning's attempts to broaden the support of the Reform movement through populism, the party was dominated by social conservatives. Manning's reluctance to allow his party to wholly embrace socially conservative values contributed to his deposition as leader of the new Canadian Alliance in favour of Stockwell Day. Certain issues remain frozen among conservative circles in Canada, such as the attempted legislation to restrict abortion in 1990 under the Brian Mulroney government that made its way to Senate, but did not pass.

The social conservative movement remained very influential in the Canadian Alliance even after Day's defeat at the hands of Stephen Harper in 2002.

In the Conservative Party of Canada that emerged from a coalition of Canadian Alliance members and Progressive Conservatives, social conservatives are still a force to be taken into account. However, many Conservative Party supporters have been disappointed with what they regard as the minimal influence of social conservatism in the Stephen Harper government. In part, this minimal influence can be explained by the fact of a minority government; however, some would blame it also on Harper's own lack of enthusiasm for the changes social conservatives would advocate.

Since the 2010s, an increasing number of prominent social conservative party MPs have been removed as MPs such as Brad Trost in 2019, and Derek Sloan in 2021.

The Christian Heritage Party of Canada is also socially conservative, as are its provincial wings like the Christian Heritage Party of British Columbia. The People's Party of Canada has also been described as socially conservative. There are other socially conservative provincial parties such as, formerly, the Family Coalition Party of Ontario and the Alberta Social Credit Party.

=== Geography ===
Social conservatism is strongest in Alberta, long Canada's most conservative province, where the Social Credit movement preached evangelical values and came to power in the 1930s. It is a factor as well in parts of British Columbia outside of the Lower Mainland and Vancouver Island. Social conservatives are strongest in rural settings, especially in Western Canada; however, social conservatism is not limited geographically to any one area or to any one political party.

=== Organizations ===
There are a number of small organizations in Canada still active that espouse social conservatism or collaborate with the broader social conservative movement.

- Liberty Coalition Canada: Fergus, Ontario
- Association for Reformed Political Action: Ottawa, Ontario
- Campaign Life Coalition: Hamilton, Ontario
- Focus on the Family Canada, and Institute of Marriage and Family Canada: Langley, British Columbia
- Institute for Canadian Values

== See also ==
- Clerico-nationalism
