= History of prostitution in Canada =

Canada inherited its criminal laws from England. The first recorded laws dealing with prostitution were in Nova Scotia in 1759, although as early as August 19, 1675 the Sovereign Council of New France convicted Catherine Guichelin, one of the King's Daughters, with leading a "life scandalous and dishonest to the public", declared her a prostitute and banished her from the walls of Quebec City under threat of the whip. Following Canadian Confederation, the laws were consolidated in the Criminal Code. These dealt principally with pimping, procuring, operating brothels and soliciting. Most amendments to date have dealt with the latter, originally classified as a vagrancy offence, this was amended to soliciting in 1972, and communicating in 1985. Since the Charter of Rights and Freedoms became law, the constitutionality of Canada's prostitution laws have been challenged on a number of occasions.

== Until the Second World War ==
Canada originally inherited many of its criminal laws from England. The first legislation dealing with prostitution in Canada was a Nova Scotia Act of 1759 which allowed imprisonment for "lewd behaviour". Most prostitution in the early days of Canadian history took place in brothels which were in every city. Action by the authorities occurred only in the context of other criminal or socially undesirable activity taking place in or in the vicinity of these brothels such as creating a public nuisance. As in many other countries, what control there was of prostitution existed under vagrancy laws designed to keep public places free of "undesirables". Owners or operators of brothels (bawdy houses) could also be prosecuted as vagrants. These were based on the British Vagrancy Act 1824.

Once the federal government came into being following Confederation in 1867, it became possible to develop common criminal laws for all of Canada. Women under 21 were protected from 'defilement' from that date, while in 1869, vagrancy provisions were consolidated and extended to include males 'living on the avails' of prostitution. The penalties were increased in 1874, and bawdy houses regulated from 1886.

By a lack of suitable alternatives, women were annexed into the sex industry. Only from about 1890 was there concern about the actual existence of prostitution, with religious groups, early feminists and women's groups such as Woman's Christian Temperance Union (WCTU) and the National Council of Women of Canada campaigning for social purity and against prostitution, which was condemned as a 'social evil', and 'white slave trade', a popular concern of the time. This produced an enthusiasm for rescuing 'fallen women'. However, with increasing action against brothels, more and more people working in prostitution carried out their business on the streets.

The federal Parliament enacted the first Criminal Code in 1892. Existing provisions were included and refined in the new Code, including making it an offence to procure women 'for unlawful carnal connection'. The laws continued to be amended in various ways over the years. From 1892 to 1972, this created an offence under 175(1)(c) for

a vagrant who: being a common prostitute or nightwalker is found in a public place and does not, when required, give a good account of herself.

Up to the 1880s prostitution was largely tolerated in the Prairie provinces. Before 1909 there were few arrests and even fewer fines for prostitution, in part because those caught were encouraged to leave town rather than be jailed. As the population became more settled, however, public opinion regarding this resource for itinerant men turned hostile. For example, a smallpox epidemic in the red light districts of Calgary ignited a crackdown as demanded by middle-class women reformers. Local chapters of the Woman's Christian Temperance Union vigorously opposed both saloons and prostitution, and called for woman suffrage as a tool to end those evils.

== Postwar ==
The social purity movement became much less prominent after World War I but had little effect on the extent of prostitution, but there was now less public concern. Throughout enforcement was heavily gendered, with only a few men prosecuted under the avails and procurement laws. In 1947, it became an offence to transport a woman to a bawdy house.

=== Vagrancy ===
The original 1892 Criminal Code described 12 ways in which a "loose, idle or disorderly person or vagrant" might be arrested and upon conviction subjected to a maximum fine of $50 or imprisonment not exceeding six months with or without hard labour. This was directed at the person as "vagrant" (status law). In 1954, amendments made vagrancy the doing of a prohibited act, and these were reduced to five. Three of them dealt with street disorder and were nicknamed Vag A, B and C after the respective clauses, and thus the prostitution prohibition as Vag C or vagrancy (c).

The original vagrancy laws were discriminatory in that they were applied overwhelmingly to women and criminalised the status of "being a common prostitute" rather than criminalising the behaviours associated with prostitution. For these reasons, the original status offences for prostitution could be said to contravene the current Charter of Rights and Freedoms.

Both the judiciary and the 1970 Report of the Royal Commission on the Status of Women complained about this.

In 1972 section 164.1:

No Apparent Means of Support

Every one commits vagrancy who:
(a) -not having any apparent means of support is found wandering abroad or trespassing and does not, when required, justify his presence in the place where he is found;
(b) -begs from door to door or in a public place;

(c) -being a common prostitute or night walker is found in a public place and does not, when required, give a good account of herself

was replaced by language prohibiting soliciting (communicating) for the purposes of prostitution (section 195.1), which read:

every person who solicits any person in a public place for the purpose of prostitution is guilty of an offence punishable on summary conviction.

The new law was now gender neutral and defined an offence based on an act (although not the nature of the act) and was thought to have addressed the social nuisance concerns of residents. However it soon became clear that there were now new problems.

In Hutt v. R. (1978) [SCC 82 D.L.R. (3d) 95] it was held that for the activities of a prostitute to be criminal their conduct must conform to the dictionary definition of "solicit"; it must be importuning, or "pressing or persistent" and constitute more than a mere indication that she was willing to prostitute herself. A plainclothes police officer permitted the appellant to enter his car. She then identified herself as a prostitute and discussed terms. The Court did not believe that this fell within the intent of parliament to prohibit acts "which would contribute to public inconvenience." Four judges indicated that they would not have considered an automobile a "public place," also excluding the actions from section 195.1. Following this there was concern that the police could no longer act against street prostitution unless there was "pressing or persistent" behaviour.

=== Municipal initiatives ===
Residents started to campaign against sex work as a public nuisance, primarily to have it shifted out of their neighbourhoods. The 1978 Hutt decision led to public pressure to amend section 195.1 to expand the definition of soliciting. Street prostitution was described as a " plague" and there was pressure to deal with activity that was claimed to blight residential and commercial areas, and to be associated with criminal activity, including drugs and exploitation of children.

The federal government was seen to not be proactive on this prompting some cities to take action. Montreal (1980) and Calgary (1981) enacted bylaws that banned the use of streets and other public areas for prostitution. These cities claimed powers, derived from the provinces, to regulate the streets and restrict criminality. Although police and city officials claimed the bylaws to be effective, they were found to be unconstitutional. In Westendorp v R (1983) the Supreme Court found the Calgary by‑law was ultra vires. Similarly for Montreal (Goldwax et al. v. City of Montreal, [1984] 2 S.C.R. 525). These rulings therefore nullified other similar bylaws enacted or proposed in Vancouver, Niagara Falls, Regina and Halifax. However, a 1983 Montreal by‑law forbidding the selling of any services on city streets without a permit was upheld in Quebec Superior Court.

Agitation for change continued at the municipal level as being most directly affected by the presence of prostitution. Ottawa and Edmonton created task forces in 1992 while Halifax, Montreal and Toronto police addressed juvenile prostitution and, in particular, exiting schemes.

==== Ottawa ====
Ottawa made 33 recommendations. Many of these focused on enforcement, while others addressed crime prevention, education and crisis intervention programs. Others supported the 1990 C49 report for a re-examination of the Fraser Report. Specifically, these addressed funding for research and more control of harassment or obstruction. The Ottawa report also asked the Minister to work with municipalities to establish a National Crime Prevention Council. In response, the City took action to deter automobile traffic in certain areas.

==== Edmonton ====
Edmonton focused on the juvenile issue, proposing amendments to child welfare legislation and the Criminal Code. It also proposed bylaws to regulate dating and escort services, exotic entertainers and massage parlours, including licensing, which were subsequently enacted.

==== Toronto ====
In response to the 1995 Federal-Provincial-Territorial Working Group on Prostitution report "Dealing with Prostitution in Canada," Toronto's Board of Health advocated decriminalisation in 1995, with the City taking the responsibility of regulating the industry. The City then endorsed these proposals, further specifying that it involved only adult prostitution, supporting the federal report's proposals on juveniles.

Toronto also enacted a bylaw to restrict intimate erotic lap dancing in August 1995 to prohibit physical contact, including touching, between patrons and attendants, with a maximum fine of $50,000, and revocation of licences. Adult entertainment parlours were unsuccessful in having this quashed by the courts. In Ont. Adult Entertainment Bar Assn. v. Toronto, 26 O.R. (3d) 257 [1995], it was held that the bylaw was enacted for valid objectives relating to business regulation, including health, safety and the prevention of crime, and did not usurp the Government's jurisdiction over criminal law. The court did not believe that the bylaw violated dancers' freedom of expression. Close-contact dancing was not a constitutionally protected right. This was upheld at the appellate level.

==== Other ====
Other cities saw Edmonton and Toronto as examples of allowing municipal intervention without being ultra vires and the 1990s saw Victoria, Vancouver, Calgary, Winnipeg, Sault Ste. Marie and Windsor following suit. Civil suits, however, were undertaken on the basis of over-charging licence fees In 2002, an Edmonton prostitute commenced an action against the City, demanding it lower the license fee for escorts from $1,600. The action claimed that the City of Edmonton was "living off the avails of prostitution" by imposing such a high licence fee.

=== Provincial initiatives ===
In 1984, the British Columbia Attorney General applied to the B.C. Supreme Court for an injunction to restrain, as a common law public nuisance, prostitution‑related activity in a residential area of Vancouver. The interim injunction (A.G. B.C. v. Couillard (1984), 42 C.R. (3d) 273) prohibited persons from publicly offering or appearing to offer themselves, directly or indirectly, for the purposes of prostitution, in addition it addressed trespassing and disturbance of the peace by prostitutes. Evidence was presented from residents of the West End as to the effect on their neighbourhood. However, the interim measure was rescinded after the enactment of new legislation in December 1985.

In 1984, the Attorney General of Nova Scotia applied for an injunction in the City of Halifax. The application was refused on the grounds of being ultra vires. The Court of Appeal upheld this in March 1985 (A.G. N.S. v. Beaver (1985), 67 N.S.R. (2d) 281, 155 A.P.R. 281).

The provinces have continued to seek ways of controlling prostitution without infringing Parliament's jurisdiction over the Criminal Code. The Traffic and Highway Acts in several provinces have been amended to allow police to seize, impound and sell vehicles of clients. Manitoba enacted this in 1999. In 2001 and 2002, Nova Scotia, Alberta, and Saskatchewan followed. Ontario went further in 2002 with a civil law allowing the province to ask the courts to freeze, seize and forfeit to the Crown property that is the proceeds of unlawful activity including prostitution, without involving criminal charges. Other provincial Acts authorize the suspension of a driver's licence on conviction of a prostitution related offence involving a motor vehicle.

=== Inquiries ===
==== Fraser Committee (1983–85) ====
The Justice Minister established a committee in June 1983 to enquire into prostitution and pornography, headed by Paul Fraser, which reported in April 1985. The other members of the committee were: Susan Clark, Mount St Vincent University, Halifax; Mary Eberts, a civil litigator specialising in equality issues, from Toronto; Jean-Paul Gilbert, a member of the National Parole Board, Montreal; John McLaren, Dean of Law at the University of Windsor; Andrée Ruffo, a lawyer practising in family law in Montreal; Joan Wallace, a lawyer specialising in human rights, Vancouver.

That report stated that prostitution was widespread in Canada, particularly in cities. Although empirical evidence was lacking, it concluded that economic necessity was a major motivation for many women. Public opinion was ambivalent. Most people opposed further criminalization, but there was support for actions to alleviate public nuisance associated with it.

In the report, three strategies were considered; criminalization, decriminalization, and regulation. Further criminalization would prohibit all forms of prostitution but was felt to be impossible to enforce, had little public support, and represented the imposition of moral views through the criminal law. The Committee did not fully support decriminalisation either, on the grounds that it found little evidence that all of the harms would be alleviated. The Committee also rejected regulation by the state.

Instead, the Committee put forward recommendations having elements of all three approaches. For the first time, recommendations addressed underlying economic and social issues, whose alleviation might improve the situation. The Committee recommended addressing social inequalities between genders, assisting women and youth in need, and funding of community groups involved with prostitution.

While the Committee (with one dissension) did not support complete decriminalisation, it suggested thorough revision of the criminal law, with tougher penalties for street prostitution because of the harm of disturbance and nuisance. It suggested a new offence of interfering or attempting to interfere, on more than one occasion, with pedestrian or vehicular traffic for the purposes of offering to engage in prostitution or of employing the services of a prostitute but not the mere offer or acceptance without disturbance.

This was to be balanced by easing restrictions on other activities. Bawdy house provisions were to be amended to allow up to two workers on a premise as out was illogical to permit prostitution but make it illegal to perform it anywhere. The committee thought that a maximum of two persons would be unlikely to be associated with public nuisance and would allow a worker to use their own home. It also proposed that prostitution establishments be permitted to be licensed and operated by provincial or territorial governments, like other businesses.

The Committee recommended repeal of the offences of procuring and living on the avails of prostitution, limiting this to the use of force, threats or other coercive or threatening behaviour. The Committee concluded its report as follows:

Prostitution cannot be dealt with on a piecemeal basis, but only by carefully linking the provisions on each aspect of prostitution-related activity.

Response was varied. Authorities were positive about strengthening measures against street work, but negative about relaxing sanctions against indoor work, and no support emerged at the Provincial level.

==== C-49 Review (1987-90) ====
Bill C-49 (1985) stated its objectives were to remove "street prostitutes and their customers from "downtown neighbourhoods." It also mandated a review within three years. A research study was therefore undertaken in 1987–88 to determine whether C-49 resulted in "a reduction in the nuisance of street prostitution Vancouver, Calgary, Toronto, Montreal and Halifax were chosen as major test sites, with smaller studies in Regina, Winnipeg, London, Niagara Falls, Ottawa, Trois-Rivières and Quebec City. Interviews were conducted with police officers, Crown prosecutors, defence lawyers, judges, prostitutes, customers, pimps, social agency staff, and business people and residents. Baseline data was available from the 1984 report of the Fraser Committee. The report, "Street Prostitution: Assessing the Impact of the Law" was published in July 1989 by the Department of Justice. The report concluded that although the

practice of street prostitution was modified somewhat by the communicating law ... (i)n most of the cities included in the study, street prostitution was as prevalent as it was before the new law.

In 1989, the Standing Committee on Justice and the Solicitor General conducted a comprehensive review of Bill C‑49, reporting in October 1990. Its three recommendations were the following:

- (1) that the departments responsible for justice, health and welfare, and employment, at all levels of government, develop programs to provide start‑up and core funding to community‑based agencies providing integrated, holistic programs accessible and responsive to the needs of male and female prostitutes wishing to leave the street solicitation trade;

- (2) that the Identification of Criminals Act be amended to allow for the fingerprinting and photographing of those charged under section 213 of the Criminal Code, whether as prostitutes or as customers; and

- (3) that section 213 of the Criminal Code be amended to provide sentencing judges with the discretion to prohibit persons convicted of street solicitation involving a motor vehicle, in addition to any other penalty imposed, from driving a motor vehicle for a period not to exceed three months.

Essentially, in its 1991 response, the government rejected the recommendations and did not amend legislation. It suggested that rather than proceed with developing exit strategies, further consultation should be undertaken, and that further penalties would not enhance exiting. The final recommendation was also rejected as being irrational.

=== Further amendments to the Criminal Code ===
Despite the apparently neutral language of the law, the courts continued to interpret 'person' as woman, requiring a 1983 amendment defining "prostitute" as a person of either sex who engages in prostitution.

The next problem, also relating to gender neutrality, was the issue of whether it was discriminatory, applying only to the seller not the buyer. Case law was inconsistent. The B.C. Court of Appeal held "for the purpose of prostitution" referred only to the seller (R. v. Dudak (1978), 3 C.R. (3d) 68) while the Ontario Court of Appeal held (in R. v. DiPaola (1978), 4 C.R. (3d) 121) that it referred to either party.

==== C-49 (1985) ====
It was clear that the law needed to be reviewed, and Bill C‑49 was introduced in 1985, coming into force on December 28, 1985, replacing section 195.1. The new offence (section 213) referred to any person in a public place (or place open to public view) who stopped or attempted to stop a motor vehicle, impeded pedestrian or vehicular traffic, or interfered with the entry to a building, or stopped any person or engaged in

communicating in a public place for the purposes of prostitution

"Public place" was defined as including motor vehicles in or on public places. This section was to be reviewed after three years. The Justice Minister stated that further amendments would be forthcoming, but nothing came of this. The section was challenged unsuccessfully in the Supreme Court in 1990. The new section was welcomed by citizens and authorities, but critics claimed it would merely displace the phenomenon, endanger workers, and give the police and court too much discretionary power.

==== C-15 (1988) ====
In 1988 Bill C‑15 made it an offence to obtain or attempt to obtain the sexual services of a minor, increasing the maximum penalty to 14 years for anyone convicted of living on the avails of a prostitute under the age of 18 years.

==== C-36 (2014) ====
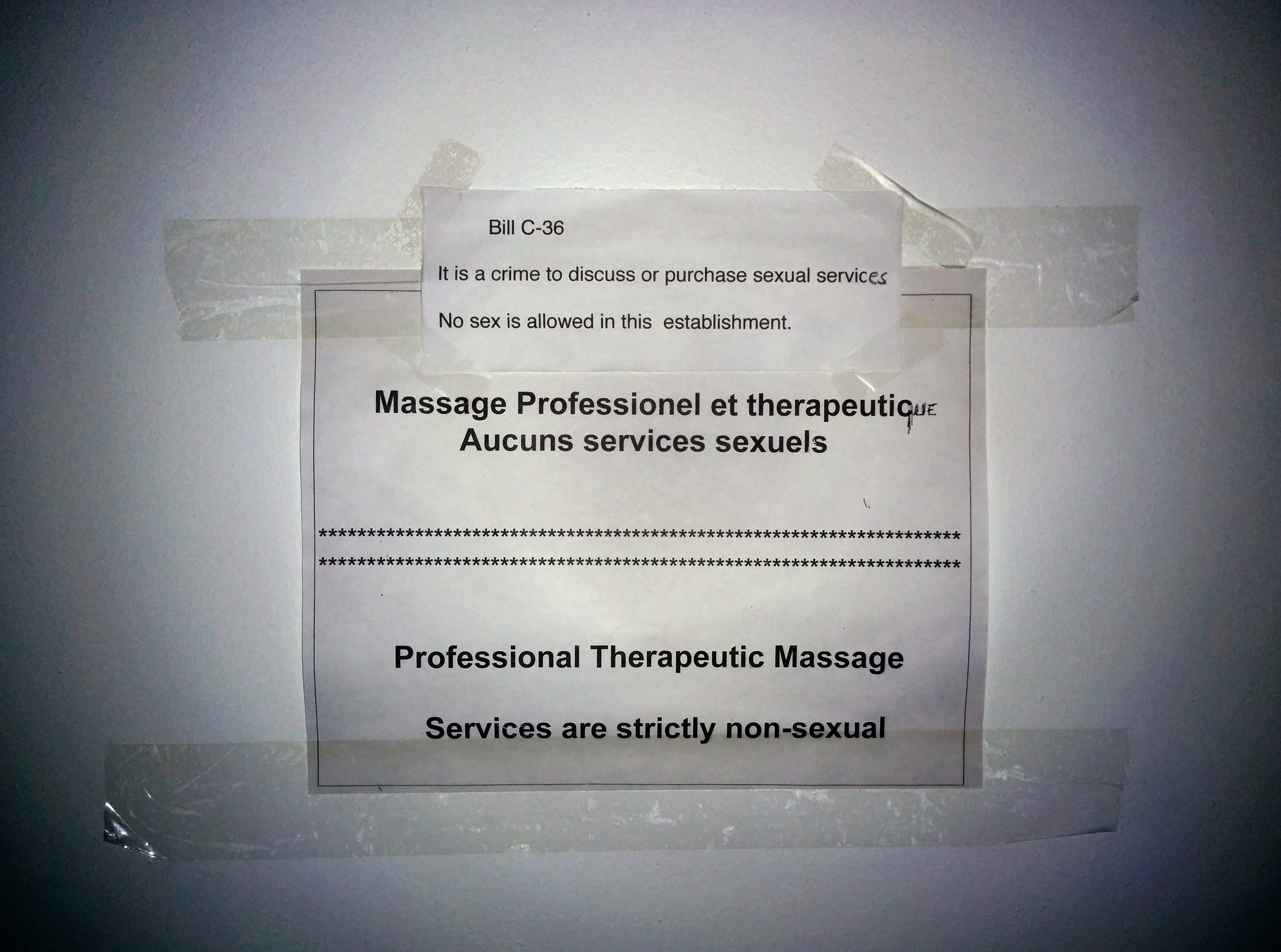
Sign about Bill C-36 in a massage parlor in Montreal, September 2015

Following a declaration by the Supreme Court in December 2013 that certain key provisions in the existing law were unconstitutional, Peter MacKay introduced Bill C-36, the Protection of Communities and Exploited Persons Act in June 2014. The bill was approved by the Senate on November 4, 2014, and came into effect on December 6, 2014. Unlike previous legislation, C-36 primarily targets those who buy sex, and seeks to reduce the demand for prostitution—a term which was widely replaced with the euphemism "sexual services for consideration". Bill C-36 made it illegal to "[obtain] sexual services for consideration", receive "material benefits" from sexual services performed by another person, and to "knowingly advertise an offer to provide sexual services for consideration" by another person. Individual sex workers are given a form of immunity for advertising or receiving consideration from "their own" sexual services. The previous prohibition on communicating in public places for the purposes of such services was loosened, and now only applies to communications conducted at or near day care facilities, schools, and playgrounds, and when one interrupts pedestrian or vehicular traffic to perform such communications.

Supporters of Bill C-36 argued that the bill would help improve safety for sex workers. Those against the law argued that the law restricts the ability for sex workers to safely search for clients and conduct their business. Emily Symons, chairperson of POWER, an advocacy group for prostitutes in the Ottawa region, argued that C-36 "not only reintroduces laws deemed unconstitutional in a unanimous decision by the Supreme Court only one year ago — it actually makes them worse."
