= Alan Young (lawyer) =

Canadian lawyer and academic (1955–2024)

Alan N. Young
- Born: December 1, 1956; Toronto, Ontario, Canada
- Died: December 7, 2024 (aged 68)
- Education: York University
- Occupations: Lawyer, academic, researcher
- Known for: Innocence Project
- Spouse(s): Rivka (div. 1999); Laura Young
- Website: www.osgoode.yorku.ca/faculty-and-staff/young-alan-n/

Alan N. Young (December 1, 1956 – December 7, 2024) was a Canadian lawyer and professor of law at Osgoode Hall Law School in Toronto, Ontario. Young was notable for leading several Charter challenges against Canadian laws, including the landmark Bedford case which resulted in Canada's prostitution laws being struck down.

After graduating from Osgoode Hall, Young clerked for Chief Justice Bora Laskin of the Supreme Court of Canada and worked as a criminal lawyer in Toronto. In 1986, he joined Osgoode Hall as an associate professor. At Osgoode, he co-founded and directed the school's Innocence Project, which seeks to investigate and overturn cases of wrongful conviction and provides experiential education to law students.

During his 30-year tenure as a law professor, Young maintained a small practice in criminal law and provided free legal consul for cases that could set legal precedents. He was recognized by Canadian Lawyer Magazine as one of the "Top 25 Most Influential" in the justice system and legal profession in 2010, 2011, 2012 and 2014. In 2018, he was also awarded the Dianne Martin Medal for Social Justice Through Law. He retired in July 2018.

== Early life, education and death ==
Born on December 1, 1956 in Toronto, Young grew up in a middle-class home in the Jewish neighbourhood of Bathurst and Wilson until the age of 10 and attended Associated Hebrew Day School. He attended law school at York University's Osgoode Hall Law School, in Toronto, ranking at the top of his class. He also won a total of seven academic awards during his time at law school. He then clerked for former Supreme Court of Canada Chief of Justice, Bora Laskin, in 1981. He then obtained his LLM from Harvard Law School. In 1986, Young was hired as an Associate Professor by Osgoode Hall Law School.

Young died on December 7, 2024 at the age of 69, from cancer.

== Challenging state authority ==
As a young law professor, Young commenced a series of challenges to state authority in the late 1980s. In 1989, he was writing an article for the Media and Communications Law Journal on a recent decision by a court in Florida to ban the sale of a rap record called As Nasty as They Wanna Be, and while writing this article, an entrepreneur in London, Ontario, Marc Emery, was charged for selling this record. With extensive research having been completed for the article, Young offered to assist Emery on a pro bono basis by launching a constitutional challenge to the obscenity law and a challenge to the manner in which expressive materials are seized prior to trial.

The challenge was not successful, but, this case began a 25-year journey of offering pro bono legal assistance to vulnerable people seeking to challenge state authority. The wide variety of challenges and cases Young brought can be organized around six thematic categories: constitutional challenges to the Criminal Code; freedom of expression; helping individuals with mental disorders; helping the incarcerated and the wrongfully convicted; challenging state officials; victims rights.

=== Constitutional challenges to the Criminal Code ===
After the unsuccessful obscenity challenge in 1991, Young was also then unsuccessful in challenging the gambling offences in 1993. However, he was successful in striking down the drug literature prohibition under s.462.2 of the Criminal Code in 1995. He also unsuccessfully challenged the drug paraphernalia prohibition contained in the same section in four different jurisdictions and two provinces.

In 1997, Young launched the first constitutional challenge in Canada to the offence of marijuana possession, which was ultimately dismissed by the Supreme Court of Canada. The launching of this constitutional challenge was the subject of a documentary film shown on CBC Newsworld in September 1998, Stoned: Hemp Nation on Trial. Although the law was upheld, the decision created two significant exemptions to the marijuana laws. In 1996, he secured the first licence for a farmer to grow cannabis for industrial purposes (i.e. industrial hemp), and, more significantly, in a series of court cases from 1998 to 2006, he established the right of patients to use cannabis for medical purposes. These cases compelled the government to enact a medical program and to establish a supply of medical cannabis. In addition, due to the inadequacies of the medical program, Young was able to secure court rulings requiring the government to amend its regulatory provisions on two occasions.

Perhaps one of the most celebrated victories of Young's career is the case of Canada (AG) v Bedford in 2013, in which he and a team of students successfully challenged three provisions of Canada's sex work laws. As a result of this successful invalidation, in June 2014, the Harper government introduced Bill C-36, the Protection of Communities and Exploited Persons Act, creating a new legislative regime governing prostitution. Despite the success of the court case, Young was very disappointed with the Harper government's amendments to the Criminal Code, and in an interview with CBC, he stated that:

In 2014, the government... was given the chance to make history, but instead, chose to repeat the mistakes of history...The government has created a regime which will hurt communities, and is contrary to public interest, as it will push sex workers back into dangerous street forums.

=== Freedom of expression ===
Beyond the obscenity and drug literature cases, Young also championed numerous free speech issues, including the right of aggrieved patients to picket on hospital property and the right of journalists to protect their sources. He was also retained to represent the interests of the art galleries with respect to the operation and impact of child pornography laws.

Young also exercised his free speech rights by writing biweekly newspaper columns for the Toronto Star and for Now Magazine between the years of 2002 and 2006. His first column for the Toronto Star, "Queen is Hardly a Victim", triggered a great deal of hate mail from monarchists. His first column for Now Magazine, "Sliding Scales", resulted in the police issuing a libel notice. Continuing on this path of stirring up debate, Young published a critique of the legal profession in 2003 in his book Justice Defiled: Perverts, Pot Heads, Serial Killers and Lawyers. In the preface to the book, he noted that he chose to write an offensive book as a form of "professional suicide note," as he wanted to expose all the blemishes and warts of the profession.

=== Helping individuals with mental disorders ===
During his career, Young assisted dozens of individuals with mental disorders resolve emerging conflicts with family members and state officials. More specifically, he assisted in preventing child apprehension proceedings from being commenced, in obtaining social assistance and disability benefits, in challenging involuntary committal to psychiatric hospitals in mediating family conflicts and in securing treatment options for paranoid schizophrenics to prevent the laying of criminal charges for minor offences. Most of this work was done to prevent the escalation of conflict into legal proceedings; however, Young also represented the interests of the mentally disordered in university discipline proceedings and police discipline proceedings.

One case that aptly summarizes Young's dedication to assisting those with mental disorders is R v Taylor. In 1992, he was appointed as amicus curiae by the Ontario Court of Appeal to assist a mentally-disordered appellant who was self-represented. As a result of this case, significant changes were made to operating test used by courts to determine when an individual is unfit to stand trial and with this test, there is greater due process protections for the trial rights of disordered accused persons.

=== Helping the incarcerated and the wrongfully convicted ===
As director of the Innocence Project, Young worked on dozens of cases involving claims of wrongful conviction. In addition to investigating these claims, he was often required to assist these incarcerated individuals with a variety of issues relating to the conditions of their incarceration and their relationships with friends and family on the outside. Over the years, he conducted numerous parole hearings, two applications to transfer Canadians from prisons in Thailand and the securing of the right of a federal inmate to complete his university degree online.

In the context of working on claims of wrongful convictions, Young used litigation as a tool for political change. More specifically, he brought a number of applications to establish a constitutional duty to preserve evidence and to disclose evidence in a post-conviction setting. In 2019, he successfully established a right of post-conviction disclosure for wrongful conviction claimants who are seeking information and materials found in government files.

In 2015, Young was appointed amicus curiae by the Nova Scotia Court of Appeal to assist incarcerated individual who wished to challenge the terms and conditions of their imprisonment through the writ of habeas corpus. This case resulted in an expansion of the jurisdictional scope of the writ.

=== Challenging state officials ===
In an effort to increase the accountability of public officials, Young assisted numerous individuals who sought to launch complaints against police officers, prosecutors and their own lawyers. In particular, on three occasions he initiated complaints against police officers with respect to the manner in which the police investigated, or failed to investigate, the death of a family member. He also assisted two self-represented individuals successfully sue the police for malicious prosecution.

=== Victim rights ===
Notwithstanding his institutional role as a defense lawyer, Young was also a champion of the rights of crime victims for more than 20 years. He was the primary consultant for the federal Department of Justice on the issue of victims' rights from the 1990s, and represented numerous victims' rights groups seeking legislative reform. He also assisted numerous crime victims seeking information from police and prosecutors on the status of their cases, and attended court as a support person for many victims. Moreover, in 1999, he commenced an application seeking to create constitutional protections for crime victims under Section 7 of the Charter, but the application was not successful.

== Media and communications ==
In 1995, Young worked as legal commentary for CTV Television Network news coverage of the three-month trial of the serial killer Paul Bernardo. His recollection of the case figures prominently in the four part documentary revisiting the case "The Ken and Barbie Killers: The Lost Murder Tapes", which premiered on the Discovery Plus channel in December 2021.

There have been several print articles written about Young's contributions to the legal profession, and profiles of his work have aired on a number of television news programs: Person to Person with Paula Todd (TVO, 2000); CBC Newsworld (2002).

In 2003, Young was recognized by Now Magazine in their annual Best of Toronto Awards, and as Freedom Fighter of the Month by High Times magazine.

On two occasions, he spoke at the annual Ideacity Conference, hosted by Moses Znaimer. The issues which he discussed at this conference included that of wrongful conviction as well as the legalization of marijuana.

On September 25, 2018, TVO aired an interview with Young on "The Agenda with Steve Paikin" about his recent retirement. This interview focused on Young's career in criminal law as a "legal disruptor".

After retiring from law in 2018, Young worked on playwriting. His play, Cause and Effect? – a play on the rising incidence of mass murder – was staged by Hey Lady Productions on February 1, 2020, at the George Ignatieff Theatre in Toronto.

== Books and publications ==
In 2003 Young wrote an autobiography, Justice Defiled: Perverts, Potheads, Serial Killers & Lawyers, published by Key Porter Books.

His contributions to Canadian legal scholarship included journal articles and government reports on topics such as:

Charter of Rights and constitutional theory

- "Not Waving But Drowning: A Look at Waiver and Collective Constitutional Rights" (1988)
- "Privacy as an Endangered Species: The False Promise of the Charter" (2000)
- "Done Nothing Wrong: Fundamental Justice and the Minimum Content of Criminal Law" (2008)
- "Deprivations of Liberty: The Impact of the Charter on Substantive Criminal Law (2012)
- "Standing, Suspending, and Sharing: The Limits of the Charter as a Tool of Social Change in Criminal Justice" (2017)

Freedom of expression

- "News From the Front: The War on Obscenity and the Death of Doctrinal Purity" (1987)
- "Son of Sam and his Legislative Offspring: The Constitutionality of Stripping Criminals of Their Literary Profits" (1988)
- "From Elvis' Pelvis to As Nasty as They Wanna Be: Freedom of Expression and Contemporary Popular Music" (1990)

Police powers

- "All Along the Watchtower: Arbitrary Detention and the Police Function"
- "The Charter, The Supreme Court of Canada and the Constitutionalization of the Investigative Process", (1995)

Victims' rights

- "The Role of the Victim in the Criminal Process: A Literature Review – 1989 to 1999"
- "Crime Victims and Constitutional Rights" (2005)
- "Victims' Rights in Canada in the 21st Century" (2021)
