= Sex Professionals of Canada =

Sex workers' rights group based in Toronto

Sex Professionals of Canada (SPOC) is a Canadian activism group. SPOC was formed in 1983 and campaigns through public education and legal challenges to decriminalize Canadian prostitution laws.

== History ==
Founded in 1983, SPOC has developed into a volunteer activist organization that is entirely run by sex workers. The organization stands "for the decriminalization of all forms of sex work in Canada" and relies on donations for financial support.

According to the SPOC website, the organization's mission and principles are listed as:

- SPOC is a volunteer-run activist network that engages in advocacy and education.
- SPOC operates on the principle that all forms of consensual adult sex work are valid occupations.
- SPOC maintains that sex workers have the capacity for choice and our experiences are diverse.
- SPOC maintains that sex workers deserve labour rights, and occupational health and safety standards defined by sex workers themselves.
- SPOC members and associates oppose those who seek to "rescue" sex workers using force or coercive measures including court imposed re-education/exit programs, jails or camps.

== Key people ==
The organization's executive director is Amy Lebovitch; its deputy director is Eve Anderson; SPOC's "Exec-at-Large" is Julie Grant; and Valerie Scott is the Legal Co-ordinator.

== Bedford v. Canada ==
On March 20, 2007, Valerie Scott, Amy Lebovitch and Terri-Jean Bedford initiated an application (Bedford v. Canada) in the Ontario Superior Court of Justice seeking the constitutional invalidation of s.210 (bawdy house), s.212(1)(j) (living on the avails) and s.213(1)(c) (communicating for the purpose of prostitution) of the Criminal Code.

== See also ==
- Decriminalization of sex work
- Sex worker movements
- Sex workers' rights
