= Susan Himel =

American judge

Susan G. Himel is a judge in the Ontario Superior Court of Justice for the Toronto region. Previously, she served as the assistant Deputy Attorney General of Ontario.
