= Prostitution law in Canada =

Prostitution law in Canada follows the Nordic model, where sex work is illegal but sellers have legal immunity, with purchasers being prosecuted. This framework was established by the passage of the Protection of Communities and Exploited Persons Act (PCEPA) in 2014. Prior to this, prostitution was indirectly criminalized by a number of offences, such as a prohibition against solicitation. These laws by struck down by the Supreme Court in the Bedford decision for violating the Charter of Rights and Freedoms, which precepted the PCEPA.

== Legal history ==
=== 20th century ===
==== Sections 193, 195 (213) ====
The prohibition against communicating in public for the purposes of prostitution was challenged in the lower courts in the 20th century, with conflicting results (R. v. McLean, 28 C.C.C. (3d) 176 (1986).; R. v. Bear, 54 C.R. (3d) 68 (1986).).

Nova Scotia's Appeal Court ruled the legislation violated the guarantee of freedom of expression in the Charter of Rights and Freedoms, by constraining communication in relation to legal activity (R. v. Skinner (1987), 35 C.C.C. (3d) 203). The Alberta Court of Appeal disagreed, holding that infringement of freedom of expression was a justifiable limitation as no "clear and convincing" alternative was available for dealing with the nuisance of street prostitution (R. v. Jahelka (1987), 79 A.R. 44).

The Manitoba Court of Appeal upheld section 195.1(1)(c) on the grounds that there was no prima facie case of freedom of expression (Reference Re Sections 193 and 195.1(1)(c) of the Criminal Code, [1987] 6 W.W.R. 289).

When referred to the Supreme Court, it upheld the sections (Reference Re Sections 193 and 195.1(1)(c) of the Criminal Code, [1990] 1 S.C.R. 1123])Chief Justice Dickson for the majority (Madam Justice Wilson and Madam Justice L'Heureux‑Dubé dissenting), agreed that freedom of expression was restricted by what was now 213(1)(c) it did not infringe or deny the freedom of association guaranteed by section 2(d) of the Charter. He also held that it did not infringe the right to be treated fairly when life, liberty and security are affected by governmental action, as guaranteed by section 7 of the Charter. The reference to the court also included the bawdy house provisions which were held to not infringe the guarantee of freedom of expression provided for by section 2(b) of the Charter. Finally the impugned infringement of the freedom of expression guaranteed by section 2(b) of the Charter was justifiable under section 1 of the Charter as being a reasonable limit on a protected right.

The justification was set out in three stages:

1. The court must first characterize the objective of the law (a remedy for solicitation in public places and the eradication of social nuisance from the public display of the sale of sex). This was constructed as restricted to taking prostitution off the streets and out of public view. In this respect, Dickson disagreed with the opinion of another justice that the legislative objective addressed the broader questions of the exploitation, degradation and subordination of women.
2. The court must assess the proportionality of the legislation to the objectives; in particular any infringement of rights must be the minimum to achieve this. It was held the provisions were not unduly intrusive.
3. The court must determine if the effects of the law so infringe a protected right that it outweighs the objective. It was held that the curtailment of street solicitation was in keeping with the interests of society, for its nuisance‑related aspects.

=== 21st century ===
==== Ontario constitutional challenge 2007 ====
A legal challenge to three of Canada's many prostitution laws was filed in Ontario Superior Court in March 2007. In a decision handed down by Madam Justice Susan Himel in the Ontario Superior Court of Justice on September 28, 2010, the prostitution laws were declared invalid. The decision was stayed and an appeal was heard in by the Ontario Court of Appeal in June, 2011. On March 26, 2012 the Appeal court came to a decision which upheld the lower court's ruling on bawdy houses, modified the ruling on living on the avails to make exploitation a criminal offence, but reversed the decision on soliciting, holding that the effect on communities justified the limitation. Two of the five judges dissented from the last ruling, stating that the law on solicitation was not justifiable. The court continued a stay of effect of a further twelve months on the first provision, and thirty days on the second.

The Government announced it would appeal this decision on April 25, and on October 25, 2012, the Supreme Court of Canada agreed to hear the appeal. The Supreme Court also agreed to hear a cross-appeal by sex-trade workers on the Court of Appeal for Ontario's decision to ban solicitation. The Supreme Court of Canada heard the case on June 13, 2013.

==== British Columbia constitutional challenge 2007 ====
A related challenge was mounted in British Columbia in 2007, but did not proceed due to a procedural motion by the Attorney General of Canada seeking dismissal on the grounds of lack of standing by the litigants. This was upheld by the BC Supreme Court in 2008, but successfully appealed in October 2010. The Attorney General then appealed this decision of the British Columbia Court of Appeal to the Supreme Court of Canada who released their decision on September 21, 2012. They dismissed the appeal enabling the case to once again proceed in the court of first instance. In view of the subsequent decision by the Supreme Court of Canada, this application became moot.

==== Supreme Court decision 2013 ====
In a decision dated 20 December 2013, the Supreme Court of Canada struck down the laws in question, ruling that a ban on solicitation and brothels violated prostitutes' rights to safety. They delayed the enforcement of their decision for one year—also applicable to the Ontario sections—to give the government a chance to write new laws. Following the announcement of the decision Valerie Scott, one of the applicants, stated in the media that, regardless of the decision, sex workers must be involved in the process of constructing the new legislation: "The thing here is politicians, though they may know us as clients, they do not understand how sex work works. They won't be able to write a half-decent law. It will fail. That's why you must bring sex workers to the table in a meaningful way."

==== Government response to Supreme Court decision ====
In response, Peter MacKay, the Minister of Justice introduced amending legislation, C-36 the "Protection of Communities and Exploited Persons Act" (PCEPA) on June 4, 2014, which received first reading. Debate on second reading began on June 11. It passed the third reading on October 6 and was approved by the Senate on November 4. On November 6, 2014, Bill C-36 received Royal Assent and officially became law.

==== Post-PCEPA legal developments ====
In February 2020, an Ontario court judge struck down three parts of the PCEPA as unconstitutional: the prohibitions on advertising, procuring and materially benefiting from someone else's sexual services were violations of the 'freedom of expression' and 'security of the person' as defined in the Canadian Charter of Rights and Freedoms. Those provisions were later upheld, however, by the Ontario Court of Appeal in February 2022.

In September 2023, the Ontario Superior Court rejected a more comprehensive challenge to the PCEPA, including regarding the central prohibition against purchasing sex. An appeal before the Ontario Court of Appeal is pending.

In July 2025, the Supreme Court issued its decision in R. v. Kloubakov, upholding the constitutionality of the material benefit and procuring offences. The case involved two drivers who worked for an escort business. Earlier, an Alberta judge had sided with the drivers and invalidated the offences, but this decision was overturned by the Alberta Court of Appeal. This was the first time since Bedford the Supreme Court weighed in on the constitutionality of a prostitution offence.

== Current law ==
The PCEPA was enacted in 2014 in response to Bedford decision. PCEPA adopts a Nordic model approach to sex work, meaning it immunizes those selling of sexual services from arrest and prosecution, while criminalizing the purchasing of sexual services and those who financially benefit from the prostitution of others. The Act represented a "paradigm shift", from the old law which treated prostitution as a public nuisance, to instead a treating it as a form of exploitation. Under the law the previous living off the avails offence was replaced by a new offence of materially benefitting from prostitution. The new offence contains a number of exceptions to respond to the Supreme Court's concerns in Bedford, including for services that are provided to the general public and for "proportionate" services provided to sex workers, such as security. A new procuring offence also targets third parties who induce sex workers to engage in prostitution.

The PCEPA is opposed by sex work advocacy organizations, who instead argue for legalization or decimalization. They contest the Act's framing of sex work as inherently exploitative, and argue that the law pushes it underground because sex workers want to protect their clients from prosecution.

== See also ==
- Wendy Babcock

== Bibliography ==
- Canadian Criminal Law Information. Prostitution and Soliciting. Bastion Law Corporation
- Lloyd Duhaime. Prostitution and Related Offenses (Canada), Vancouver BC
- Brannigan. Laws and the construction of criminal behaviours. University of Calgary 2009
