= The Book of Genesis (comic) =

R. Crumb's 2009 comic adaptation of the Book of Genesis

- Cover to the first edition of The Book of Genesis Illustrated by Robert Crumb from W. W. Norton & Company
- Date: October 19, 2009
- Page count: 224 pages
- Publisher: W. W. Norton & Company

Creative team
- Creator: Robert Crumb

Original publication
- Language: English

The Book of Genesis (2009) is a comic book illustrated by American cartoonist Robert Crumb that purports to be a faithful, literal illustration of the Book of Genesis. It reached #1 the New York Times graphic novel bestseller list and on the Christian books list at Amazon.com.

Given Crumb's past body of work, and his professed rejection of religion, many assumed when the book was announced that it would be a satire or otherwise profane or subversive send-up, and were surprised or disappointed to find it "straight-faced". Crumb "resist[ed] the temptation to go all-out Crumb on us and exaggerate the sordidness, the primitivism and the outright strangeness" found in the Bible—the depictions of sex are explicit, but not gratuitous. In his introduction to the book, Crumb writes he has "faithfully reproduced every word of the original text," each word hand-lettered. The book's cover contains the warning, "Adult Supervision Recommended for Minors".

The book has been controversial, particularly for the explicit illustrations of sexual intercourse described in the text itself. In critical circles, it has drawn fire over whether and how literal the illustration job is, or should be.

== Publication history ==
The book was published by W. W. Norton & Company on October 19, 2009, in book form—the book was never serialized prior to being published.

The publisher wanted to title the book The Book of Genesis According to Robert Crumb, but Crumb insisted on changing "According to" to "Illustrated by".

The book took over four years for Crumb to finish. Holed up in a shepherd's hut in the south of France (where he and his family live), his wife Aline would bring him baskets of food.

== Style ==
=== Drawing ===
Drawn in his signature scratchy, obsessively crosshatched drawing style, Crumb avoided doing a satirical or psychedelic take on the work, as would have been expected. Reviewers have called the style "humanizing", with a "human-looking deity" with "enormous, hairy, veiny hands"; unlike much later Christian art, which Europeanized the characters from the Old and New Testaments, the characters in Crumb's book are "plac[ed...] squarely in the Middle East — and populat[ed...] with distinctly Semitic-looking people".

The clothing and sets in the book were based on stills from classic Hollywood movies, as "there's not a lot of documentation about how people dressed and lived in ancient Mesopotamia."

"I didn’t want to show sex organs, cause then the thing becomes X-rated and it limits the sales. I’ve done my share of explicit sexual drawings, as anybody who knows my work can certainly attest. I just decided it wasn’t really necessary."

— Crumb, 2009

=== Tone ===
Crumb originally intended to do a sendup of the Book of Genesis, but "I fooled around in the sketchbooks with those ideas and I just, I didn't like how it was working out so I just decided to do a straight illustration job of it. It seemed to me that the original text was so strange in its own way that there was no need to do any sendup or satire of it. My trial efforts to do that seemed lame, it wasn't working out."

Many reviewers found it surprising that Crumb kept the depictions of sex "tame", given that he is so well known for his explicit depictions of sex.

== Crumb's beliefs ==
Crumb was brought up Catholic, and thus is familiar with the more common Bible stories, but gave up the Catholic faith when he was 16. He went through a phase when he was 15 where he went "to church a lot, receiving communion, saying the Rosary, praying", but when he started to scrutinize it, "it just fell apart so quickly."

Crumb says he is spiritual, agnostic, and not an atheist; he is "interested in pursuing and understanding the spiritual nature of things." He believes there is a God, but "I don't believe [the Book of Genesis is] the Word of God. I believe it's the words of men". He occasionally refers to Ecclesiastes for spiritual guidance, but finds the Book of Genesis to be "much too primitive" to find any spiritual meaning in it.

== Sources ==
Crumb's main source was Robert Alter's translation of the Book of Genesis from 1996, although he referred to other sources, including the King James Version of the Bible. In one passage, Crumb used the "term 'handmaid', derived from the King James, to describe the young woman whom Sarai offers up to sleep with her husband, Abram, after Sarai is unable to conceive, rather than Alter’s term, 'slave girl', which evokes the woman’s subservient status."

== Reception and influence ==
Chester Brown wrote "Robert Crumb is probably the world's greatest living cartoonist, and his The Book of Genesis (2009) might be his masterpiece. It's certainly the best comics adaptation of biblical material that I know of." Brown cited The Book of Genesis as an influence on his own biblical graphic novel, Mary Wept Over the Feet of Jesus.

In 2013 The Book of Genesis was exhibited at the 55th International Venice Art Biennale. Each page of the graphic novel was individually exhibited in uniformed black frames. The audience was invited to follow the sequential images through the large exhibition space, blurring the line between subversive low-brow comic arts and fine art.

=== Awards ===
Year	Organization	Award	Result
2010	Harvey Awards	Best Artist	Won
2010	Harvey Awards	Best Original Graphic Album	Nominated
2010	Eisner Awards	Best Adaptation from Another Work	Nominated
2010	Eisner Awards	Best Graphic Album—New	Nominated
2010	Eisner Awards	Best Writer/Artist	Nominated

== See also ==
- Chester Brown's Gospel adaptations
