= Blood Ceremony =

Canadian rock band

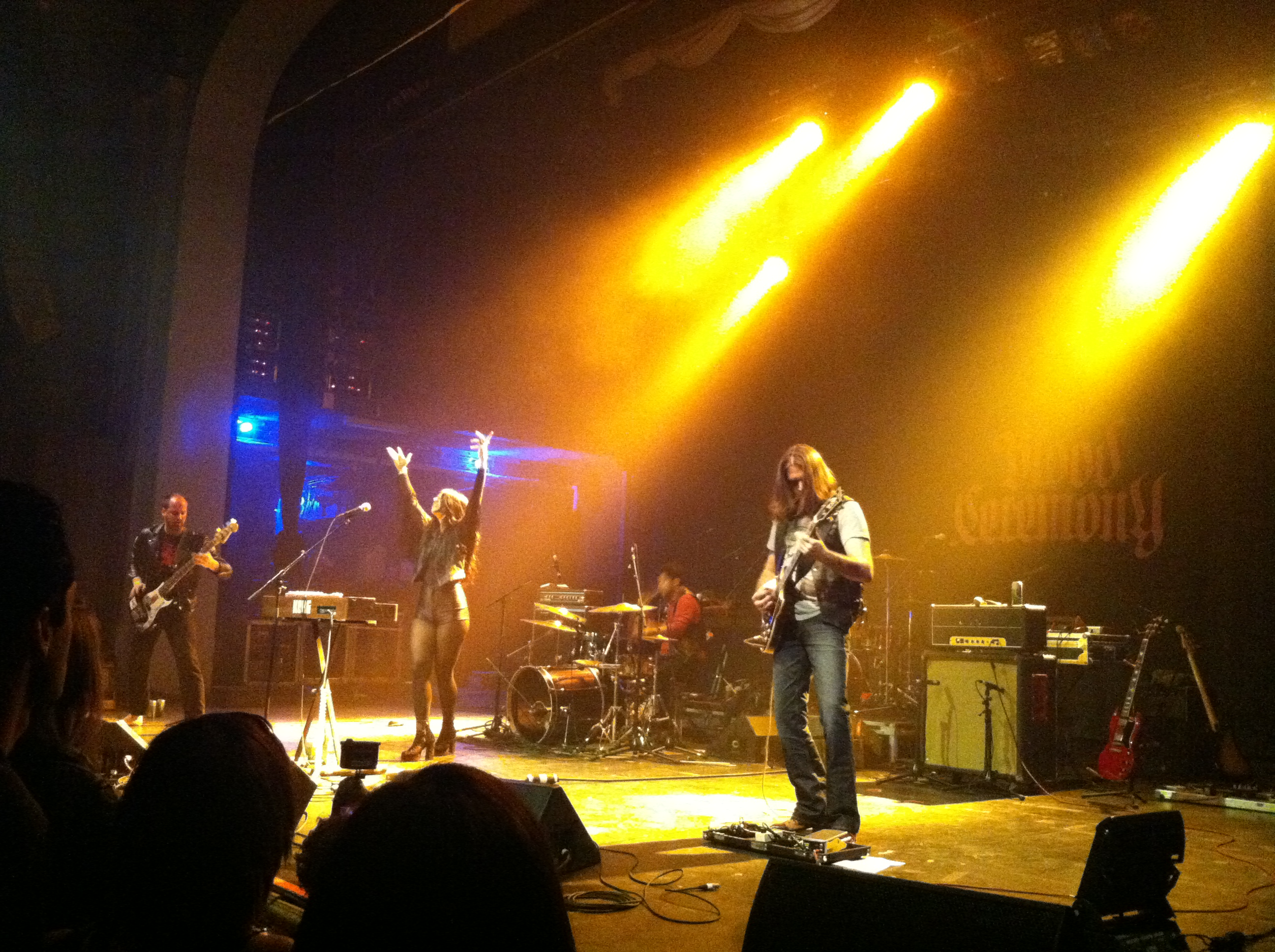
- Blood Ceremony live in Toronto at the Danforth Music Hall.

Background information
- Origin: Toronto, Ontario, Canada
- Genres: Hard rock, psychedelic folk, progressive rock, doom metal, occult rock, stoner rock
- Years active: 2006–present
- Labels: Rise Above, Metal Blade
- Members: Alia O'Brien; Sean Kennedy; Lucas Gadke; Michael Carrillo
- Past members: Chris Landon; Jeremy Finkelstein; Andrew Haust

Blood Ceremony is a Canadian rock band formed in 2006 in Toronto, Ontario. Blood Ceremony's style has been described as "flute-tinged witch rock" and their lyrics are filled with black magic imagery and references to classic horror films. Their music has been also characterized as hard rock, psychedelic folk, progressive rock, and doom metal.

The band is fronted by singer/flutist/organist Alia O'Brien, whose flute solos are reminiscent of Jethro Tull's Ian Anderson. Torontoist has called Blood Ceremony "Toronto's most original band".

== History ==
The band was created by O'Brien with guitarist Sean Kennedy, who is responsible for most of the songwriting.

The band's self-titled debut studio album was released in 2008, followed by Living with the Ancients in 2011, both on Rise Above Records. The albums were reissued on Metal Blade.

Blood Ceremony spent the latter part of 2009 touring throughout Europe with Electric Wizard. During the latter part of 2011 and the early part of 2012, they supported Ghost on their European and North American tours.

They have since released two additional albums, The Eldritch Dark (2013, Metal Blade) and Lord of Misrule (2016, Rise Above).

O'Brien received a Canadian Screen Award nomination for Best Original Song at the 7th Canadian Screen Awards for "Ghost of Love (Onakabazien Remix)", which she cowrote with Sook-Yin Lee and Adam Litovitz for Lee's film Octavio Is Dead!. She also performs as a member of Badge Époque Ensemble.

Blood Ceremony's 5th full-length album, The Old Ways Remain, was released in May 2023.

== Style ==
Blood Ceremony's style has been described as occult rock, and by their label as "flute-tinged witch rock". In a 2011 interview on Finland's NukeTV, O'Brien called their style "heavy rock" and claimed that their distinct sound is the result of each band member having different musical influences. She cited late 1960s and early 1970s progressive rock as crucial to her inspiration, called Jethro Tull her "very first, favorite band", and also listed Black Sabbath, Uriah Heep, Osanna, Pentagram, Witchfinder General, Electric Wizard and Pagan Altar as having a major impact. Guitarist and songwriter Kennedy called Blood Ceremony a "folkier Sabbath", and cited "heavier Black Sabbath", 1980s doom metal and British folk artists such as Pentangle and Fairport Convention as influential.

== Members ==
Current

- Alia O'Brien - lead vocals, flute, organ
- Sean Kennedy - guitars
- Lucas Gadke - bass, backing vocals
- Michael Carrillo - drums

Former

- Chris Landon - bass
- Jeremy Finkelstein - drums
- Andrew Haust - drums

== Discography ==
=== Studio albums ===
Year	Album	Peak positions	Certification
Year	Album	FIN	Certification
2008	Blood Ceremony	–	
2011	Living with the Ancients	–	
2013	The Eldritch Dark	34	
2014	Let It Come Down (single)	–	
2016	Lord of Misrule	–	
2019	Lolly Willows (single)	–	
2023	The Old Ways Remain	–	
