= Chester Brown's Gospel adaptations =

Brown's depiction of Jesus in the Gospels of Mark (left) and Matthew (right)

Chester Brown adapted Gospel of Mark and part of the Gospel of Matthew to comics; installments appeared in his comic books Yummy Fur and Underwater. Brown ran the first installment of the Gospel of Mark in Yummy Fur #4 in 1987, and left Matthew unfinished after cancelling Underwater in 1997. Brown had planned to do all four of the canonical gospels, but in 2011 stated that it is unlikely he will finish even Matthew.

== Background ==
=== Brown's beliefs ===
Brown was brought up in a strictly Christian Baptist household. Over his career, he has gone back and forth between belief and non-belief in Christianity.

Brown took on his retelling of the Gospels to try to figure out what he really believed.

== Gospel of Mark ==
Gospel of Mark
Issue	Date	Passages
Yummy Fur # 4	April 1987	Mark 1:01–39
Yummy Fur # 5	June 1987	Mark 1:40–3:12
Yummy Fur # 6	August 1987	Mark 3:13–4:14
Yummy Fur # 7	1987	Mark 5:1–6:6
Yummy Fur # 8	November 1987	Mark 6:6–7:23
Yummy Fur # 9	March 1988	Mark 7:24–8:21
Yummy Fur #10	May 1988	Mark 8:22–9:13
Yummy Fur #11	July 1988	Mark 9:14–10:34
Yummy Fur #12	September 1988	Mark 10:35–12:27
Yummy Fur #13	November 1988	Mark 12:28–14:52
Yummy Fur #14	January 1989	Mark 14:53–16:20

Brown began his adaptation of the Gospel of Mark in issue #4 of Yummy Fur in 1987. It ran alongside his surreal, taboo-breaking Ed the Happy Clown serial, which led readers to expect a similar treat of the Gospel; instead, he provided a straight adaptation, running to issue #14 of Yummy Fur. Brown lays out the story at six equal panels per page, each panel illustrating one verse of the Gospel of Mark. On the final page of the final installment, Brown stops illustrating the story after Mark 16:8, where the myrrhbearers flee Jesus's empty tomb. The final four panels are of an unnamed old man reciting the final verses against a black background. These four panels are of what scholars believe is an extended ending to Mark's Gospel.

The adaptation became more idiosyncratic as it developed: On pages 55 and 56 Brown wove into the story a passage from the Secret Gospel of Mark, a highly contentious and disputed document said to have been written by Clement of Alexandria that Professor Morton Smith claimed to have discovered in 1958.

=== Mark sources ===
Brown stated he had a large number of sources for his adaptation of Mark. The books he referred to most frequently were:

- Green, Jay P., Sr. (editor), The Pocket Interlinear New Testament, Baker Book House (1979)
- The New International Version of the Bible
- The King James Version of the Bible
- Gaus, A. (translator), The Unvarnished Gospels, Threshold Books (1988), ISBN 978-0-939660-25-4
- Nineham, D.E., Saint Mark: The Pelican New Testament Commentaries The Gospel of St. Mark, Pelican (1972)
- Laymon, Charles M. (editor), The Interpreter's One-Volume Commentary on the Bible, Abingdon Press (1971)
- Smith, Morton, The Secret Gospel, Dawn Horse Press (1973), about the Secret Gospel of Mark
- Smith, Morton, Jesus the Magician: Charlatan or Son of God?, Harper & Row (1978)

== Gospel of Matthew ==
Gospel of Matthew
Issue	Date	Passages
Yummy Fur #15	March 1989	Matthew 1:1–2:13
Yummy Fur #16	June 1989	Matthew 2:14–2:23
Yummy Fur #17	August 1989	Matthew 3:1–4:17
Yummy Fur #19	January 1990	Matthew 4:18–4:22
Yummy Fur #20	April 1990	Matthew 4:23–5:10
Yummy Fur #21	June 1990	Matthew 5:11–7:27
Yummy Fur #22	September 1990	Matthew 7:28–8:17
Yummy Fur #24	April 1990	Matthew 8:18–8:27
Yummy Fur #25	July 1991	Matthew 8:28–9:14
Yummy Fur #26	October 1991	Matthew 9:14–9:17
Yummy Fur #27	January 1992	Matthew 9:20
Yummy Fur #29	August 1992	Matthew 9:18–9:30
Yummy Fur #31	September 1993	Matthew 9:31–10:42
Yummy Fur #32 entire issue	January 1994	Matthew 11:2–12:45,14:2–14:12
Underwater # 2	December 1994	Matthew 12:46–13:58
Underwater # 3	May 1995	Matthew 14:1–2,12–23
Underwater # 4	September 1995	Matthew 14:24–31
Underwater # 5	February 1996	Matthew 14:32–15:28
Underwater # 6	May 1996	Matthew 15:29–16:12
Underwater # 7	August 1996	Matthew 16:13–17:9
Underwater # 8	December 1996	Matthew 17:10–27
Underwater # 9	April 1997	Matthew 18:1–19:1
Underwater #10	June 1997	Matthew 19:1–20:2
Underwater #11	October 1997	Matthew 20:1–29

The Gospel of Matthew started in issue #15 of Yummy Fur in 1989 and continued through to the premature end of Underwater in 1997. As of 2011, it has yet to be finished.

Brown's gospels gained a reputation for being "ingeniously blasphemous" mainly from his Matthew retellings. In contrast to Mark's Jesus, who is "serene and always in control," in Matthew he is a scowling, balding figure, and "there is a more radicalized disbelief and a greater focus on the fleshy and earthly aspects of the story." Brown's depiction of the Matthew's version of the Saviour is "a Jesus that shouts. He's a Jesus that screams", his face "haggard and worn, his dark hair matted and stringy".

The disciples are depicted as awkward, fearful and full of doubt, who are "barely able to reconcile the greatness of God with the miseries of their existence".

As Brown has pointed out, starting with the full-issue installment of Matthew in Yummy Fur #32, he deliberately changed Jesus's third-person references to himself to first-person references in the dialogue.

=== Matthew sources ===
Amongst the books Brown cited for his Matthew adaptation are:

- Shaberg, Jane. The Illegitimacy of Jesus: A Feminist Theological Interpretation of the Infancy Narratives. Harper & Row (1987)
- Maccoby, Hyam. The Mythmaker: Paul and the Invention of Christianity. Harper & Row (1986)
- Barnstone, Willis (editor). The Other Bible: Jewish Pseudepigrapha, Christian Apocrypha, Gnostic Scriptures, Kabbalah, Dead Sea Scrolls. Harper & Row (1984)
- Schonfield, Hugh. The Original New Testament. Harper & Row (1985)

=== Unfinished state ===
Matthew has been on hiatus since 1997, with the story left with Jesus about to enter Jerusalem. Brown had long said he planned on coming back to the story, but in an interview at The Comics Journal in 2011, he said he would not likely finish it, as his heart was no longer in it. He stated they were "poorly done".

== Reception ==
The Gospel adaptations have generally been well-accepted by fans and critics. John Bell calls them Brown's most important uncollected work.

To Francis Hwang of City Pages, "the paradox of faith is brilliantly, heartbreakingly depicted" in the Gospel of Matthew.

== Relation to Brown's other work ==
Religious and biblical elements have found their way into almost all of Brown's work:

- "The Twin", a story of young Jesus adapted from a story from the Gnostic text Pistis Sophia, which appears in The Little Man
- Various religious imagery in Ed the Happy Clown, especially Jesus' quote, "If thy hand offend thee cut it off", and the character Chet's religious remorse over having sex with Josie the vampire that leads to him murdering her
- his thinking about buying an issue of Playboy while sitting in church that opens The Playboy
- his battles with his mother over wearing his Sunday clothes in I Never Liked You
- Louis Riel's talking with God in the graphic novel of the same name.
- Mary Wept Over the Feet of Jesus, which features adaptation of various biblical episodes

== See also ==
- Alternative comics
- The Book of Genesis by Robert Crumb
- Unfinished creative work
