= Wigs 'n' Guns =

Studio album by Sook-Yin Lee
- Released: 1996
- Genre: Rock music
- Label: Zulu Records

Sook-Yin Lee chronology
Lavinia's Tongue (1994)	Wigs 'n' Guns (1996)

Professional ratings
Review scores
Source	Rating
Allmusic	4/5 stars

Wigs 'n' Guns is the second solo album by Sook-Yin Lee, released in 1996 on Zulu Records.

The cover was drawn by Lee's then-boyfriend, cartoonist Chester Brown.

The song "Knock Loud" was covered by Neko Case on her 2001 release Canadian Amp.

== Track listing ==
1. Sleep Song
2. Poison Lake
3. Sandra Dee
4. Oh No
5. Fresh Air
6. Stubborn
7. Chan Is Missing
8. Knock Loud
9. Born Free
10. To the Zoo
11. Lucky Elephant
12. Cats, Cunts and Rubber Cocks
13. John Bob John
14. Hole in the Wall
15. Sweet Dreams (Get Up!)
