= Lavinia's Tongue =

Studio album by Sook-Yin Lee
- Released: 1994
- Genre: Rock music
- Label: Zulu Records

Sook-Yin Lee chronology
| Lavinia's Tongue (1994) | Wigs 'n' Guns (1996) |

Professional ratings
Review scores
| Source | Rating |
|---|---|
| Allmusic | link |

Lavinia's Tongue is the debut solo album by Sook-Yin Lee, released in 1994 on Zulu Records.

== Track listing ==
1. "Dreaming Out Loud" (4:37)
2. "The Hair Song" (4:05)
3. "Striptease" (3:00)
4. "Going Home to Spawn" (:27)
5. "Lullaby" (2:54)
6. "Your Noodle's Cooked" (1:24)
7. "Sixty Miles Away" (5:19)
8. "Staying In" (3:33)
9. "Chinese Restaurant Muzak" (1:03)
10. "Me and Mary Ann" (2:50)
11. "We Didn't Know How to Play a Song" (2:20)
12. "Mr. Noodle Theme" (1:23)
13. "Quasimodo" (3:27)
14. "Two Polaroids" (1:49)
15. "I Think of You" (3:41)
16. "Vocal Improv With Vibrator" (1:48)
17. "Personality 46/64" (4:16)
18. "Nothing" (2:58)
