= Perfume Tree =

Band from Vancouver, British Columbia

- Origin: Vancouver, British Columbia
- Genres: Ambient, electronica, techno, trip hop, downtempo, chill out, drum and bass, ethereal, psychedelic
- Years active: 1991 - 2000, 2024 - 2025
- Label: Zulu (early) World Domination (later)
- Members: Pete Lutwyche - programming, guitars, keyboards Jane Tilley - vocals, bass, guitar Also: Bruce Turpin - live beat mixing Ian MacLachlan - programming Melissa "Mel" McCabe - bass Adam Sloan - bass Jim Peers - bass Martin Bell - bass

Perfume Tree is a band from Vancouver, British Columbia that existed from 1991 until December 1999, before becoming active again in November of 2024. Members were Jane Tilley, Bruce Turpin and Peter Lutwyche The band performed mostly psychedelic electronic rock.

== History ==
Perfume Tree was formed by a group of disc jockeys from the University of British Columbia's campus radio station, CITR. The group signed with Zulu Records, and released an album, Dust, in 1992.

After releasing three more albums with Zulu, the band signed with World Domination Records, and released an EP, Fathom the Sky in 1995.

The band continued performing in the Vancouver area. Their 1998 album Feeler blended Tilley's vocals with electronic rock rhythms.

Four of their songs were chosen for the 2000 Canadian crime drama The Spreading Ground directed by Derek Vanlint. Virgin, Dreaming, and Paradise were used in part, and So Far Away appeared almost in its entirety at the end of the film.

The song Uneasy, from the album A Lifetime Away, appeared on the soundtrack to the 2007 film Weirdsville.

A few of their songs were used in the Teton Gravity Research skiing films.

The samples "Don't you believe in anything?" and "The future's not so bad, have faith in me" from the song Aircraft Engines on The Sun's Running Out are Ace from the Doctor Who episode The Curse of Fenric when she speaks to the Vicar in the empty church.

Perfume Tree's last album, Felt, was released in 2000. Tilley and Lutwyche went on to form Veloce with Ian MacLachlan.

In 2024, the band announced it's "reawakening" on social media, mentioning new tunes and reissues.

On July 5th, 2025, Perfume Tree performed at the Khatsahlano street party in Vancouver, BC, a live music event curated by Zulu Records.

== Discography ==
- Dust - Zulu Records, 1992
- Remote (Extended Play) - Zulu Records, 1993
- The Sun's Running Out - Zulu Records, 1994
- A Lifetime Away - Zulu Records, 1995
- Fathom the Sky (Extended Play) - World Domination Records, 1995
- Tides Out - World Domination Records, 1997
- Feeler - World Domination Records, 1998
- Felt - World Domination Records, 2000
- Another Dusk - 2025
