= Octavio Is Dead! =

- Directed by: Sook-Yin Lee
- Written by: Sook-Yin Lee
- Produced by: Jennifer Weiss; Simone Urdl; Jamie Manning
- Starring: Sarah Gadon; Rosanna Arquette; Raoul Trujillo
- Cinematography: Daniel Grant
- Music by: Alia O'Brien; Adam Litovitz; Sook-Yin Lee
- Production company: The Film Farm
- Release date: June 2, 2018 (Inside Out)
- Country: Canada
- Language: English

Octavio Is Dead! is a 2018 Canadian supernatural drama film written and directed by Sook-Yin Lee. It premiered on June 2, 2018 at the Inside Out Film and Video Festival before going into theatrical release on June 22.

The film stars Sarah Gadon as Tyler, a young woman who unexpectedly inherits all of her estranged father Octavio's (Raoul Trujillo) possessions after his death. Over the objections of her domineering mother Joan (Rosanna Arquette), she goes to the apartment, only to discover that her father is still present there as a ghost who leads her through a complex exploration of her sexual and personal identity. While wearing her father's clothes, she meets and becomes attracted to Apostolis (Dimitris Kitsos), a gay university student who perceives her as a man.

== Reception ==
Octavio Is Dead! currently has a score of 60% on Rotten Tomatoes based on five reviews.

The film received four Canadian Screen Award nominations at the 7th Canadian Screen Awards in 2019, for Best Cinematography (Daniel Grant), Best Art Direction or Production Design (Elisa Sauve), Best Costume Design (Hanna Puley) and Best Original Song (Lee, Adam Litovitz and Alia O'Brien for "Ghost of Love (Onakabazien Remix)".

The film had its television premiere on July 20, 2019 on CBC Television.
