= The Art of Woo =

2001 film by Helen Lee

- Directed by: Helen Lee
- Written by: Helen Lee
- Produced by: Anita Lee; Peter O'Brian
- Starring: Sook-Yin Lee; Adam Beach
- Cinematography: Steve Cosens
- Edited by: Vesta Slivanovic
- Music by: Ron Sexsmith; Kurt Swinghammer
- Production company: ArtStar Pix
- Release date: 9 September 2001
- Running time: 97 minutes
- Country: Canada
- Language: English

The Art of Woo is a 2001 Canadian romantic comedy film written and directed by Helen Lee and starring Sook-Yin Lee and Adam Beach.

== Plot ==
Alessa Woo (Sook-Yin Lee), an art gallery employee in Toronto, has built an image as a rich heiress, but is in dire financial straits. She attempts to court rich men to feed her lifestyle, but is prone to changing partners. One day, talented aboriginal artist Ben Crowchild (Adam Beach) moves into the apartment next door, leading to the two sharing a bathroom. In order to spurn a persistent suitor, Nathan (Don McKellar), Woo takes hold of Crowchild and kisses him. The two later become friends with benefits.

Soon, Woo is approached by the idly rich art collector Patrick Aucoin (Joel Keller), who proposes to her; Woo becomes tempted. However, she has developed feelings for the seemingly unwealthy Crowchild. Crowchild, who has similar emotions, reveals to her that he was adopted by Aucoin's father and that he himself is rich, but posing as a poor artist to be better received by the community. Woo and Crowchild become a couple.

== Production ==
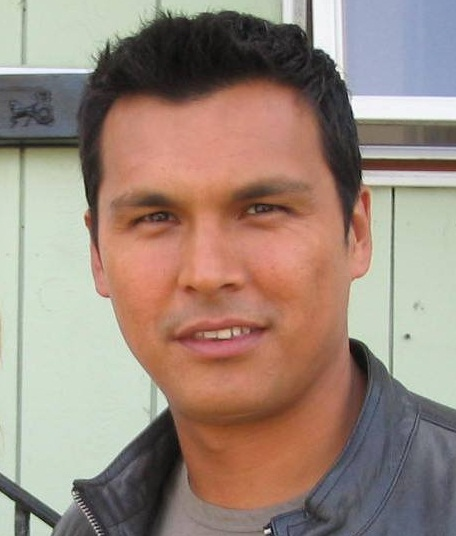
Saulteaux actor Adam Beach was cast in the lead male role of Ben Crowchild.

The Art of Woo was the feature film directorial debut of Helen Lee. After Lee's previous short film, Priceless, she was approached by co-producer Anita Lee and offered the chance to direct a feature-length romantic comedy. Finding herself depressed by the "heaviness" of Priceless, Helen Lee accepted. She wrote the first draft in two weeks after watching several "classic" romantic comedies; the speed in writing was caused by her desire to receive a grant for up to C$ 500,000 from the Canadian Film Centre's Featured Film Project (FFP), granted for low-budget films. After approval, they received assistance from FFP member Peter O'Brian to ensure they would finish the film within a year.

Helen Lee intended to insert themes of gender and race through showing social anxieties, class distinctions, and cultural displacements. Two reviewers noted a resemblance between The Art of Woo and the 1961 film Breakfast at Tiffany's.

As there was a scheduling conflict with Sandra Oh, the first choice to play Alessa Woo, Helen Lee cast MuchMusic video jockey Sook-Yin Lee. Sook-Yin Lee underwent acting courses in Montreal with Jacqueline McClintock.

Helen Lee was lent paintings from local artists Michael Snow and Suzy Lake to use for filming, while Ron Sexsmith and Kurt Swinghammer did the soundtrack. The Art of Woo was filmed digitally in Toronto over 20 days between March and April 2001. Locations included the University of Toronto, The Power Plant, and Archive Gallery Inc.

== Release and reception ==
The Art of Woo was released at the Toronto International Film Festival.

Upon its release, The Art of Woo was "slashed" by Canadian critics. Erin Oke of Exclaim! found the film to have "many appealing aspects", but felt that the situations were often contrived and it lacked a uniting vision; she surmised that it could have been a better film had it not tried "quite so hard to be likeable all the time". Lisa Braun of Jam! enjoyed the soundtrack but found the dialogue poor; she summarized that the film was "uneven, but audiences [would] be interested to see what Lee does next". Jonathan Crow, writing for the Rovi Corporation, found the film "less fun and less accomplished than a third grade theater production". At the 2002 Genie Awards, Ron Sexmith won Best Achievement in Music – Original Song for his work in the film.

== Sources ==
- Braun, Lisa (7 December 2001). "Art Of Woo an incomplete study". Jam!.
- Crow, Jonathan (n.d.). "The Art of Woo". AllMovie.
- "Feature Films" (PDF). Toronto Film and Television Office. 20 December 2001. p. 1. Archived from the original (PDF) on 5 March 2007.
- Hoolboom, Michael (2008). Practical Dreamers: Conversations with Movie Artists. Toronto: Coach House Books. ISBN 978-1-55245-200-4.
- Oke, Erin (November 2001). "The Art of Woo Directed by Helen Lee". Exclaim!.
