= Chester Brown =

Canadian cartoonist (born 1960)

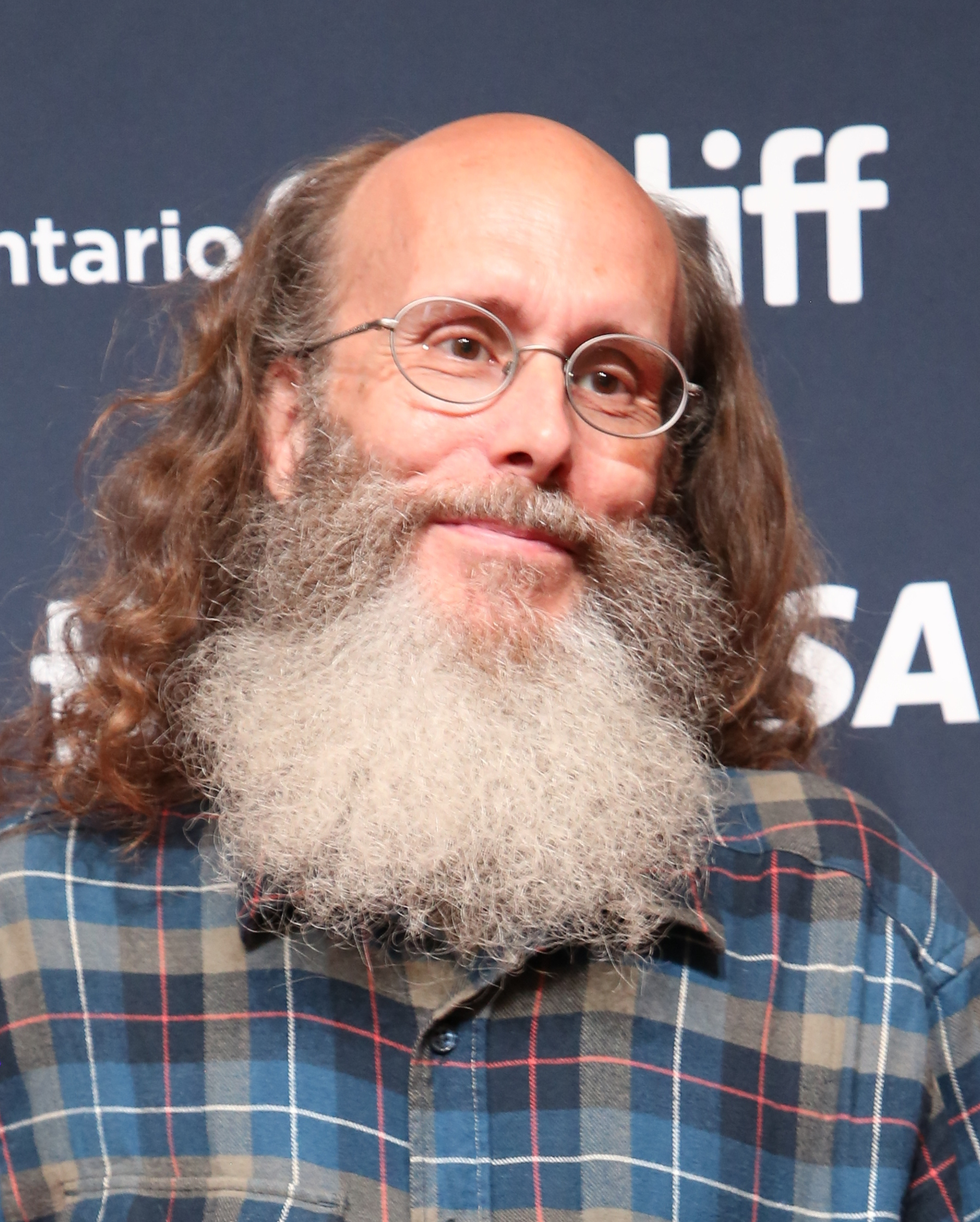
- Brown at the 2024 Toronto International Film Festival
- Born: Chester William David Brown; 16 May 1960 (age 66); Montreal, Quebec, Canada
- Other name: CWDB
- Occupation: Cartoonist
- Political party: Libertarian
- Awards: Inkpot Award (2011)

Chester William David Brown (born 16 May 1960) is a Canadian cartoonist. Brown has gone through several stylistic and thematic periods. He gained notice in alternative comics circles in the 1980s for the surreal, scatological Ed the Happy Clown serial. After bringing Ed to an abrupt end, he delved into confessional autobiographical comics in the early 1990s and was strongly associated with fellow Toronto-based cartoonists Joe Matt and Seth, and the autobiographical comics trend. Two graphic novels came from this period: The Playboy (1992) and I Never Liked You (1994). Surprise mainstream success in the 2000s came with Louis Riel (2003), a historical-biographical graphic novel about rebel Métis leader Louis Riel. Paying for It (2011) drew controversy as a polemic in support of decriminalizing prostitution, a theme he explored further with Mary Wept Over the Feet of Jesus (2016), a book of adaptations of stories from the Bible that Brown believes promote pro-prostitution attitudes among early Christians.

Brown draws from a range of influences, including monster and superhero comic books, underground comix, and comic strips such as Harold Gray's Little Orphan Annie. His later works employ a sparse drawing style and flat dialogue. Rather than the traditional method of drawing complete pages, Brown draws individual panels without regard for page composition and assembles them into pages after completion. Since the late 1990s Brown has had a penchant for providing detailed annotations for his work and extensively altering and reformatting older works.

Brown at first self-published his work as a minicomic called Yummy Fur beginning in 1983; Toronto publisher Vortex Comics began publishing the series as a comic book in 1986. The content tended towards controversial themes: a distributor and a printer dropped it in the late 1980s, and it has been held up at the Canada–United States border. Since 1991, Brown has associated himself with Montreal publisher Drawn & Quarterly. Following Louis Riel Brown ceased serializing his work to publish graphic novels directly. He has received grants from the Canada Council to complete Louis Riel and Paying for It.

== Life and career ==
=== Early life ===
Chester William David Brown was born on 16 May 1960 at the Royal Victoria Hospital in Montreal, Quebec, Canada. He grew up in Châteauguay, a Montreal suburb with a large English-speaking minority. His grandfather was history professor Chester New, after whom Chester New Hall is named at McMaster University in Hamilton, Ontario. He has a brother, Gordon, who is two years his junior. His mother had schizophrenia, and died in 1976 after falling down the stairs while in the Montreal General Hospital.

Though he grew up in a predominantly French-speaking province and had his first mainstream success with his biography of French-speaking Métis rebel leader Louis Riel, Brown says he does not speak French. He said he had little contact with francophone culture when he was growing up, and the French speakers he had contact with spoke with him in English.

Brown described himself as a "nerdy teenager" attracted to comic books from a young age, especially ones about superheroes and monsters. He aimed at a career in superhero comics, and after graduating from high school in 1977 headed to New York City, where he had unsuccessful but encouraging interviews with Marvel and DC Comics. He moved to Montreal where he attended Dawson College. The program did not aim at a comics career, and he dropped out after a little more than a year. He tried to find work in New York, but was rejected again. He discovered the alternative comics scene that was developing in the early 1980s, and grasped its feeling freedom to produce what he wanted. At 19 he moved to Toronto, where he got a job in a photography lab and lived frugally in rooming houses.

=== Toronto (1979–1986) ===
At around twenty, Brown's interests moved away from superhero and monster comic books towards the work of Robert Crumb and other underground cartoonists, Heavy Metal magazine, and Will Eisner's graphic novel A Contract with God (1978). He started drawing in an underground-inspired style, and submitted his work to publishers Fantagraphics Books and Last Gasp; he got an encouraging rejection when he submitted to Art Spiegelman and Françoise Mouly's Raw magazine. He became friends with film archivist Reg Hartt, and the two unsuccessfully planned to put out a comics anthology called Beans and Wieners as a showcase for local Toronto talent.

In 1983 Brown's girlfriend Kris Nakamura introduced him to the small-press publisher John W. Curry (or "jwcurry"), whose example inspired the local small-press community. Nakamura convinced Brown that summer to print his unpublished work as minicomics, which he did under his Tortured Canoe imprint. The sporadically self-published Yummy Fur lasted seven issues as a minicomic. Brown soon found himself at the centre of Toronto's small-press scene. While he found it difficult at first, Brown managed to get the title into independent bookstores, the emerging comic shops, and other countercultural retailers, and also sold it through the growing North American zine network. Yummy Fur had respectable sales through several reprintings and repackaging.

Brown and a number of other cartoonists featured in a show called Kromalaffing at the Grunwald Art Gallery in early 1984. He had become a part of Toronto's avant-garde community, along with other artists, musicians and writers, centred around Queen Street West. In 1986, at the urging of Brown's future friend Seth, Vortex Comics publisher Bill Marks picked up Yummy Fur as a regular, initially bimonthly comic book. Brown quit his day job to work full-time on Yummy Fur.

=== Vortex and Ed the Happy Clown (1986–1989) ===
Starting publication in December 1986, the first three issues of Yummy Fur reprinted the contents of the seven issues of the earlier minicomic, and Brown quit his job at the copy shop. Brown began to weave together some of the earlier unrelated strips into an ongoing surreal black comedy called Ed the Happy Clown. The bizarre misfortunes of the title character include being inundated in the faeces of a man unable to stop defaecating, being chased by cannibalistic pygmies, befriending a vengeful vampire, and having the head of his penis replaced by the head of a miniature Ronald Reagan from another dimension.

A counterpoint to the at-times blasphemous Ed serial, Brown also began to run straight adaptation of the Gospels, beginning with the Gospel of Mark in a subdued style. What appeared a natural target of satire for the author of Ed was instead a continuing attempt of Brown's to find what he really believed, having been raised a Christian Baptist. The adaptations later continued with the Gospel of Matthew and the apocryphal "The Twin" from the Gnostic text Pistis Sophia, and Brown went through periods of agnosticism and Gnosticism.

The offensive content of Ed caused it to be dropped by one printer, and is suspected to be behind Diamond Comic Distributors' decision to stop distributing Yummy Fur starting with issue #9. After The Comics Journal announced they would be investigating the issue, Diamond started distributing it again.

In 1989 the first Ed collection appeared, collecting the Ed stories from the first twelve issues of Yummy Fur with an introduction by American Splendor writer Harvey Pekar and drawn by Brown. At this point, Brown had grown to lose interest in the Ed story as he gravitated toward the autobiographical approach of Pekar, Joe Matt, and Julie Doucet, and the simpler artwork of Seth. He brought Ed to an abrupt end in Yummy Fur #18 to turn to autobiography.

=== Autobio and Drawn & Quarterly (1990–1992) ===
The 19th issue of Yummy Fur began his autobiographical period. First came the strip "Helder", about a violent tenant in Brown's boarding house, followed by "Showing 'Helder'", about the creation of "Helder" and the reactions of Brown's friends to the work-in-progress. With "Showing 'Helder'" Brown breaks from his earlier syle by giving the panels no borders and arranging them organically on the page—a style that was to characterize his work of this period. He found his friends were uncomfortable with his writing about their lives, and soon turned to his adolescence for source material.

Brown began the first installment of what was to become the graphic novel The Playboy in Yummy Fur #21, under the title Disgust. The revealing, confessional story tells of the teenage Brown's feelings of guilt over his obsessive masturbating over the Playmates of Playboy magazine, and the difficulties he had relating to women even into adulthood. Critical and fan reception was strong, though it drew some criticism from those who saw it glorifying pornography. Playboy's publisher Hugh Hefner wrote Brown a letter of concern that Brown could feel such guilt in a post-sexual revolution world. It appeared in a collected edition titled The Playboy in 1992.

Around this time, Brown had become friends with the cartoonists Seth and Joe Matt. The three became noted for doing confessional autobio comics in the early 1990s, and for depicting each other in their works. In 1993, they did an interview together in The Comics Journal's autobiographical comics issue. Seth had joined the new Montreal-based comics publisher Drawn & Quarterly, which had also started publishing Julie Doucet. D&Q's Chris Oliveros had been courting Brown to join as well, but Brown had felt loyal to Bill Marks for giving him his first break. When his contract came up in 1991, however, Oliveros offered Brown nearly double the royalty he was getting from Vortex. Brown moved to D&Q starting with Yummy Fur #25.

=== Vancouver and Underwater (1992–1997) ===
The dialogue in Underwater gradually becomes comprehensible as its protagonist acquires language.

In 1992, Brown began a relationship with musician Sook-Yin Lee, and in 1993 moved to Vancouver to be with her. He stayed there with her until 1995, when Lee began as VJ at MuchMusic in Toronto, and the two moved back there together.

Brown moved away from autobio after the conclusion of Fuck, and for his next major project, Chris Oliveros convinced him to change the title, believing the title Yummy Fur was no longer a fitting one for the direction that Brown's work had taken, and that the title made the book harder to sell. His next work, Underwater, would appear under its own title, while continuing the Gospel of Matthew adaptation as a backup feature.

Underwater was an ambitious work. Its lead character, Kupifam, was an infant who was surrounded by an encoded (Note: "It's really just a code. Simple letter substitution." – Brown in 2008) gibberish-like language, which she comes to understand in bits and pieces. Fans and critics gave the series a lukewarm reception, with its glacial pacing and obscure narrative. Eventually, Brown came to feel he had gotten in over his head with the scope of the project. In early 1998, he decided to leave it in an unfinished state.

Partway through the series, in 1996, Brown and Lee broke up. They continued to live with each other, and have continued to be close friends. Brown came to decide that he no longer wanted to have exclusive relations with women, but also realized he lacked the social skills to pick up girls for casual sex. He spent the next few years celibate.

=== Louis Riel and frequenting of prostitutes (1998–2003) ===
Brown's father died in 1998 as he was putting together his collection of short strips, The Little Man. He lost interest in Underwater, and had been reading about Métis resistance leader Louis Riel, and decided he wanted to do a biography on him. He wanted to do it as an original graphic novel, but Chris Oliveros convinced him to serialize it first. Drawn & Quarterly put out the ten issues of Louis Riel from 1999 until 2003, and with help from a CAD$16,000 grant from the Canadian Council for the Arts, the finished annotated collection appeared in 2003, to much acclaim and healthy sales. In Canada it became a bestseller, a first for a Canadian graphic novel.

In 1999, after three years of celibacy, Brown decided he would start frequenting prostitutes. His open nature prevented him from hiding this fact from his friends, and the fact soon became widely known. After completing Louis Riel, he embarked upon another autobiographical graphic novel that would detail his experiences as a john. This time, the work would not be serialized, and would wait until 2011 to be published as Paying for It.

In the early 2000s, Brown moved out from the place he shared with Lee and got himself a condominium, where he lived by himself, and was free to bring prostitutes home. Around this time, Joe Matt moved back to the US, and Seth moved to Guelph, Ontario, breaking up the "Toronto Three".

=== Libertarianism and Paying for It (2004–present) ===
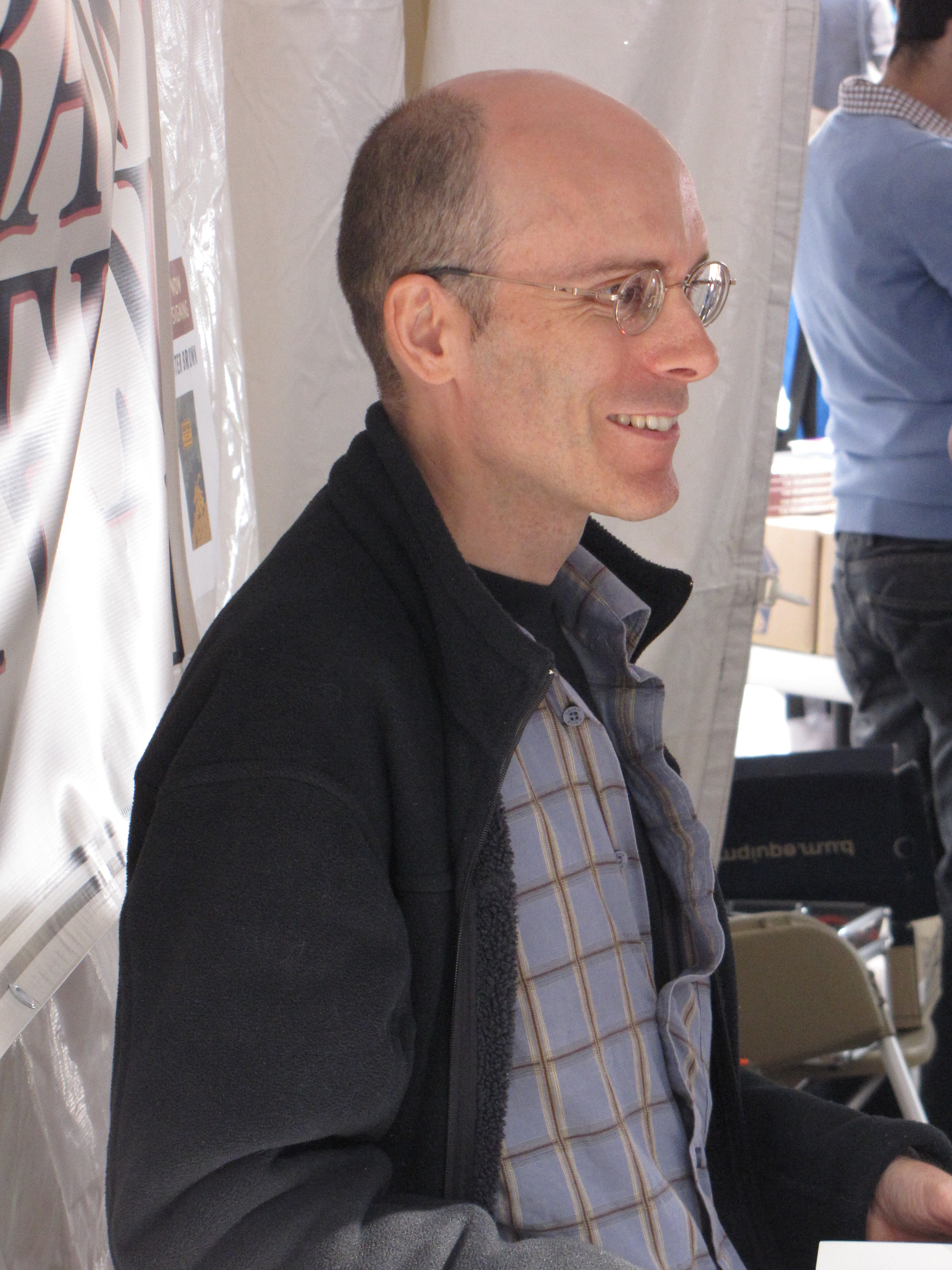
Brown at the 2009 Toronto Word on the Street festival

While reading up on issues surrounding Louis Riel, Brown became increasingly interested in property rights. His reading eventually took him to believe that countries with strong property rights prospered, while those without them did not. This path gradually led him to espouse the ideology of libertarianism. He joined the Libertarian Party of Canada and ran as the party's candidate in the riding of Trinity—Spadina in Toronto in the 2008 and 2011 federal elections.

During the long wait between Louis Riel and Paying for It, Brown allowed Drawn & Quarterly to reprint Ed the Happy Clown as a serial comic book, with explanatory notes that were becoming both more common and more detailed in Brown's work. In 2007 Brown provided six weeks worth of strips to Toronto's NOW magazine as part of the "Live With Culture" ad campaign. The strip features a male zombie and a living human girl participating in various cultural activities, culminating in the two going to a movie theatre to watch Bruce McDonald's yet-unmade Yummy Fur adaptation.

Brown's next graphic novel, Paying for It, came out during the 2011 election, in which he was running. Again he finished with the help of a Canada Council grant. It was a polemic promoting the decriminalization of prostitution, and attracted praise for its artistry and bare-all honesty, and criticism for its subject matter and Brown's perceived naïveté as he brushes aside concerns about human trafficking and dismisses drug addiction as a myth. At about this time, Brown finally stated he didn't intend to finish his Gospel of Matthew, which had been on hiatus since 1997.

In 2016 Brown followed up Paying for It with Mary Wept Over the Feet of Jesus, made up of adaptations of stories from the Bible that Brown believes promote pro-prostitution attitudes among early Christians, and argues for the decriminalization of prostitution. Brown declared his research determined that Mary, mother of Jesus, was a prostitute, that early Christians practised prostitution, and that Jesus's Parable of the Talents should be read in a pro-prostitution light. Brown describes himself as a Christian who is "not at all concerned with imposing 'moral' values or religious laws on others" and believes that Biblical figures such as Abel and Job "find favour with God because they oppose his will or challenge him in some way".

== Personal life ==
=== Religion ===
Brown was brought up in a Baptist household, and in his early twenties he began adapting the Gospels. Brown later said that this "was a matter of trying to figure out whether [he] even believed the Christian claims—whether or not Jesus was divine". During this time, Brown went through periods where he considered himself an agnostic then a gnostic. Since then, Brown has consistently described himself as religious, but has alternated between periods of identifying as a Christian and simply believing in God. As of 2016, Brown describes himself as a Christian.

=== Politics ===
In the 1980s Brown expressed sympathy for left-wing politics, although he has stated his understanding of politics was not deep. He considered himself an anarchist until, while researching Louis Riel, he became interested in issues of property rights, especially influenced by his reading of Tom Bethell's The Noblest Triumph, a book which argues that the West owes its prosperity to having established strong property rights. Brown thus gained an interest in libertarianism—a belief that government should protect property rights (although, he says, not copyrights), and otherwise should mostly keep out of people's lives. After attending a few meetings of the Libertarian Party of Canada, he was asked to run for Parliament, and collected the 100 signatures necessary to appear on the ballot.

Brown ran as the Libertarian Party's candidate for the riding (or constituency) of Trinity—Spadina in the 2008 federal election. He came in fifth out of seven candidates. He stood in the same riding for the same party in the 2011 Canadian federal election, coming in fifth out of six candidates. The 2011 election coincided with the release of Paying for It, in which Brown talks about his frequenting prostitutes. He was worried his promotion of that topic in the media would make the Libertarian Party uncomfortable with having him run, but his official Party agent and the Ontario representative assured him that, as libertarians, they believed in individual freedom, and would continue to support his candidacy.

=== Personal relations ===
A longtime friend of fellow cartoonists Joe Matt and Seth, Brown has been regularly featured in their autobiographical comics over the years, and collaborated with them on various projects. The three were often mentioned together, and have been called "the Three Musketeers of alternative comics" and the "Toronto Three", forming "a kind of gutter rat pack trying to make it through their drawing boards in 1990s Toronto". Brown dedicated The Playboy to Seth, and Paying for It to Matt. Seth dedicated his graphic novel George Sprott to Brown ("Best Cartoonist, Best Friend").

Brown had a long-term relationship with the musician, actress and media personality Sook-Yin Lee from 1992 until 1996. She is depicted in several of his comics. He moved to Vancouver for two years to be with her, and moved back to Toronto with her when she became a VJ for MuchMusic. He also drew the cover for her 1996 solo album Wigs 'n Guns. Brown's relationship with Lee is the last boyfriend/girlfriend relationship he had, as explained in Paying for It. Good friends, Brown contributed artwork to her 2009 Year of the Carnivore.

Brown's decades-long pay-for-sex mutually monogamous relationship was detailed in the Sook Yin-Lee directed 2024 film Paying for It.

== Work ==
=== Thematic subjects ===
Throughout his early years as a cartoonist he mostly experimented with drawing on the darker side of his subconscious, basing his comedy on free-form association, much like the surrealist technique Automatism. An example of such methods in Brown's work can be found in short one-pagers where he randomly selects comic panels from other sources and then mixes them up, often altering the dialogue. This produced an experimental, absurdist effect in his early strips.

Brown first discusses mental illness in his strip "My Mother Was A Schizophrenic". In it, he puts forward the anti-psychiatric idea that what we call "schizophrenia" isn't a real disease at all, but instead a tool our society uses to deal with people who display socially unacceptable beliefs and behaviour. Inspired by the evangelical tracts of Jack T. Chick, Brown left Xeroxes of these strips at bus stops and phone booths around Toronto so its message would reach a wider audience. It first appeared in Underwater #4, and is also reprinted in the collection The Little Man.

Brown's Louis Riel book was inspired by the alleged mental instability of Riel, and Brown's own anarchist politics, and he began his research for the book in 1998. Over the course of researching for the book, he shifted his politics over the course of several years until he was a libertarian. (Note: "I was an anarchist when I began the strip and I knew the story would make the government look bad. ... But in doing all the research for this book [Louis Riel], I learned a lot about general political theory. I came to realize that anarchy is completely unworkable, which I sort of suspected all along." – Brown in 2004) Regarding anarchy, Brown has said, "I'm still an anarchist to the degree that I think we should be aiming towards an anarchist society but I don't think we can actually get there. We probably do need some degree of government."

=== Art style ===
Brown's drawing style has evolved and changed a lot throughout his career. He's been known to switch between using Rapidograph pens, dip pens, brushes, pencils and markers for his black-and-white cartooning, and has used paints for some colour covers (notably in Underwater).

==== Working method ====
Brown does not follow the tradition of drawing his comics by the page – he draws them one panel at a time, and then arranges them on the page. In the case of his acclaimed graphic novels The Playboy and I Never Liked You, this allowed him to rearrange the panels on the page as he saw fit. In the case of I Never Liked You, this resulted in a different page count in the book collection than was in the Yummy Fur serialization. The panels were slightly rearranged again when the "New Definitive Edition" of I Never Liked You was released in 2002. Brown depicted himself making comics in this way in the story Showing Helder in Yummy Fur #20 (also collected in The Little Man). Despite drawing his panels individually, he says his "brain doesn't tend to think in terms of one image at a time", so that he has difficulty coming up with one-image covers.

He has used a number of different drawing tools, including Rapidograph technical pens, markers, crowquill pens and ink brushes, the latter of which he has called his favourite tool, for its "fluid grace". For much of Ed the Happy Clown, he had artwork printed from photocopies of his pencils, which was faster for him than inking the work, and produced a more spontaneous feel, but in the end he turned away from this method, feeling it was "too raw".

==== Drawing influences ====
In an interview with Seth, Brown says his earliest childhood cartoon was an imitation of Doug Wright's Little Nipper. He frequently mentions Steve Gerber as amongst his foremost influences of his teenage years. From about the age of 20, Brown discovered the work of Robert Crumb and other underground artists, as well as classic comic strip artists such as Harold Gray, whose influence is most evident in Brown's Louis Riel.

Brown often talks of contemporaries Seth, Joe Matt and Julie Doucet's influence on his work, especially during his autobiographical period. He also had been reading the Little Lulu Library around this time, and credits the cartooning of Little Lulu's John Stanley and Seth with his desire to simplify his style during this period.

The stiff, stylized look of Fletcher Hanks's comics, reprints from Fantagraphics of which Brown had been reading around the time, was the primary influence on the style Brown used in Paying for It.

== Bibliography ==
=== Series ===
Comic book series by Chester Brown
Title	Date	Publisher	Issues	Notes
Yummy Fur (mini-comic)	1983–1986	self-published	7	#1–6 compiled in one volume in February 1987 with an extra one-page strip
Yummy Fur	1986–1995	Vortex Comics (#1–24); Drawn & Quarterly (#25–32)	32	
Underwater	1995–1998	Drawn & Quarterly	11	Left incomplete
Louis Riel	1999–2003	Drawn & Quarterly	10	
Ed the Happy Clown	2004–2006	Drawn & Quarterly	9	Reprinted material from Yummy Fur with extra background information

=== Books ===
Books by Chester Brown
Title	Year	Publisher	ISBN	Notes
Ed the Happy Clown: A Yummy Fur Book	1989	Vortex Comics	978-0-921451-04-4	foreword by Harvey Pekar; incomplete
Ed the Happy Clown: The Definitive Ed Book	1992	Vortex Comics	978-0-921451-08-2	abridged; altered ending
The Playboy	1992	Drawn & Quarterly	978-0-9696701-1-7	
I Never Liked You	1994	Drawn & Quarterly	978-0-9696701-6-2	
The Little Man: Short Strips 1980–1995	1998	Drawn & Quarterly	978-1-896597-13-3	
I Never Liked You (Second Edition)	2002	Drawn & Quarterly	978-1-896597-14-0	black page backgrounds changed to white; annotations
Louis Riel	2004	Drawn & Quarterly	978-1-894937-89-4	
Paying for It	2011	Drawn & Quarterly	978-1-77046-048-5	introduction by Robert Crumb
Ed the Happy Clown: A Graphic Novel	2012	Drawn & Quarterly	978-1-77046-075-1	annotated
Mary Wept Over the Feet of Jesus	2016	Drawn & Quarterly	978-1-77046-234-2	

=== Title changes ===
Many of his books have undergone title changes, sometimes at the behest of his publisher, sometimes without his permission. Ed the Happy Clown: the Definitive Ed Book was given the Definitive title, despite the fact that he "didn't want to put that as the subtitle of the second edition. Vortex did it for marketing reasons." The Playboy was originally titled Disgust and then The Playboy Stories, and I Never Liked You was called Fuck (the German translation retains that title). Underwater was originally intended to appear in Yummy Fur, but Brown's new publisher felt they could attract more readers with a different title. Paying for It carries the sense of a double entendre that Brown dislikes (Note: "It suggests that not only am I paying for sex but I'm also paying for being a john in some non-monetary way. Many would think that there's an emotional cost – that johns are sad and lonely ... I haven't been 'paying for it' in any of those ways. I'm very far from being sad or lonely, I haven't caught an S-T-D, I haven't been arrested, I haven't lost my career, and my friends and family haven't rejected me." – Brown in 2011)–he would have preferred to call the book I Pay for Sex.

=== Illustration ===
Brown has also done a certain amount of illustration work. In 1998, he did the cover to Sphinx Productions' Comic Book Confidential #1; in 2005 he did the cover to True Porn 2 from Alternative Comics; and he illustrated the cover for Penguin Books' Deluxe Classics edition of Lady Chatterley's Lover by D. H. Lawrence. Brown illustrated the cover to the 11 July 2004, issue of The New York Times Magazine, an issue whose theme was graphic novels. He has done the cover for Sook-Yin Lee's 1996 solo album Wigs 'n' Guns (to which he also contributed lyrics for one song), and the poster for her film, Year of the Carnivore.

=== Collaborations ===
Brown provided the illustrations for the story "A Tribute to Bill Marks" in Harvey Pekar's American Splendor #15 in 1990, and "How This Forward Got Written" in The New American Splendor Anthology in 1991.

He inked Seth's pencils for the story "Them Changes" in Dennis Eichhorn's Real Stuff #6 in 1992, and shared artwork duties with Sook-Yin Lee on the story "The Not So Great Escape" in Real Stuff #16 in 1993.

He also inked Steve Bissette's pencils for the story "It Came From ... Higher Space!" in Alan Moore's 1963 #3 in 1993.

A jam piece with Dave Sim was included in the Cerebus World Tour Book in 1995.

== Recognition ==
Over the years, Brown has received four Harvey Awards and numerous Harvey and Ignatz award nominations. The autobiographical comics from Yummy Fur placed No. 38 on the Comics Journal's list of the 100 best comics of the century. Brown was inducted into the Canadian Comic Book Creator Hall of Fame, on 18 June 2011, at the Joe Shuster Awards in Calgary, Alberta, Canada. Brown was one of the cartoonists to appear in the first volume of Fantagraphics' two-volume The Best Comics of the Decade (1990. ISBN 978-1-56097-036-1).

=== Awards ===
Awards won by Chester Brown
Year	Organization	Award for	Award
1990	Harvey Awards	Chester Brown	Best Cartoonist
1990	Harvey Awards	Ed the Happy Clown	Best Graphic Album for the first edition
1990	U.K. Comic Art Award	Ed the Happy Clown	Best Graphic Novel/Collection for the first edition
1999	Urhunden Prizes	Ed the Happy Clown	Foreign Album
2004	Harvey Awards	Louis Riel	Best Writer
2004	Harvey Awards	Louis Riel	Best Graphic Album of Previously Published Work

=== Nominations ===
Award Nominations
Year	Organization	Award for	Award
1989	Harvey Awards	Yummy Fur	Best Writer
1989	Harvey Awards	Yummy Fur	Best Cartoonist
1989	Harvey Awards	Yummy Fur	Best Continuing or Limited Series
1989	Harvey Awards	Yummy Fur	Special Achievement in Humor
1990	Harvey Awards	Chester Brown	Special Award for Humor
1991	Harvey Awards	Yummy Fur	Best Continuing or Limited Series
1991	Harvey Awards	"The Playboy Stories" in Yummy Fur #21–23	Best Single Issue or Story
1991	Harvey Awards	Yummy Fur	Best Cartoonist (Writer/Artist)
1992	Harvey Awards	Yummy Fur	Best Cartoonist
1993	Harvey Awards	The Playboy	Best Graphic Album of Previously Released Material
1998	Ignatz Awards	The Little Man	Outstanding Graphic Novel or Collection
1999	Harvey Awards	The Little Man	Special Award for Excellence in Presentation
1999	Harvey Awards	The Little Man	Best Graphic Album of Previously Published Work
2000	Harvey Awards	Louis Riel	Best New Series
2002	Ignatz Awards	Louis Riel	Outstanding Artist
2003	Harvey Awards	Chester Brown	Best Cartoonist
2003	Harvey Awards	Louis Riel	Best Continuing or Limited Series
2004	Ignatz Awards	Louis Riel	Outstanding Graphic Novel or Collection
2004	Ignatz Awards	Louis Riel	Outstanding Artist

== See also ==
- Alternative comics
- The Beguiling
- It's a Good Life, If You Don't Weaken
