= Bob's Your Uncle (band) =

Canadian alternative rock band

Bob's Your Uncle was a Canadian alternative rock band formed in Vancouver. The band consisted of band founder guitarist Jamie Junger, vocalist and guitarist Sook-Yin Lee, bassist Bernie Radelfinger, harmonica player Peter Lizotte and drummer John Rule, later to be replaced by drummer Charles Pinto. The band's music was characterized by Lee's strong voice and lyrics, and with rock, jazz and blues instrumental accompaniment.

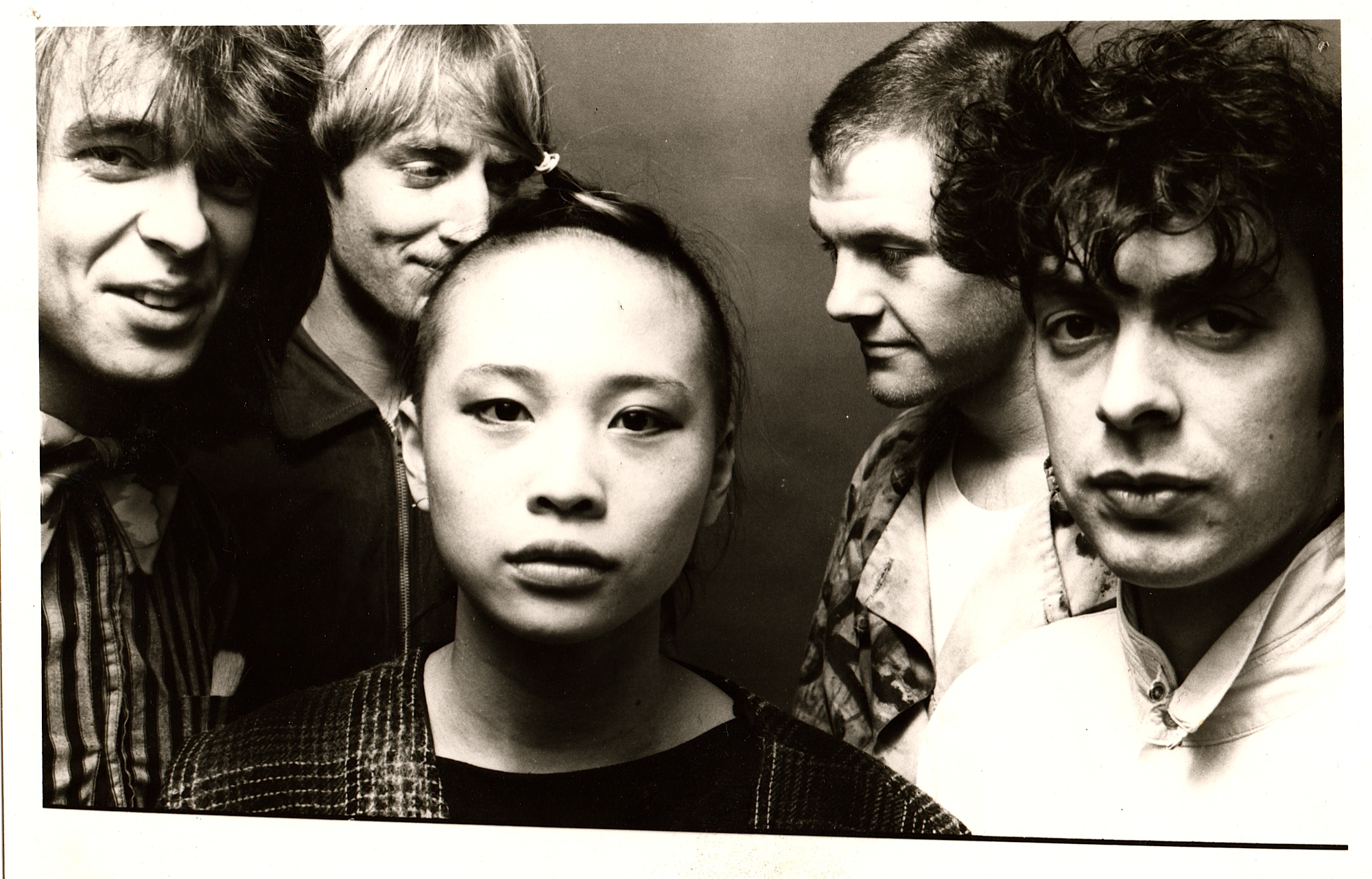
Early band photo

== History ==
The band released its first single, "Talk to the Birds", in 1985, and subsequently released their debut self-titled album in 1986. The band's second album, Tale of Two Legs, came out in 1990, and the band toured in Ontario in support. The band released one more album, Cages, on an independent label.

After Bob's Your Uncle disbanded, Junger founded a follow-up band called The Wingnuts, toured with several artists, and pursued a solo career.

Sook-Yin Lee went on to become a VJ for MuchMusic, Canada's music video station, and later an on-air personality for CBC Radio, hosting Definitely Not the Opera and acting in films.

== Discography ==
=== Singles ===
- "Talk to the Birds" (1985)

=== Albums ===
Year	Title	Label
1986	Bob's Your Uncle	Criminal Records and Tapes
1990	Tale of Two Legs	Doctor Dream Records
1993	Cages	Zulu Records
