= Helen Lee (director) =

Korean-Canadian film director

- 헬렌 리
- Born: 이현주; Seoul, South Korea
- Citizenship: Canadian
- Education: University of Toronto; New York University
- Occupation: Film director
- Years active: 1990–present
- Notable work: Sally's Beauty Spot, Prey, The Art of Woo

Helen Lee (Korean: 헬렌 리) is a Korean-Canadian film director. Born in Seoul, South Korea, she emigrated to Canada at the age of four and grew up in Scarborough, Ontario. Interested in film at a young age, she took film studies at the University of Toronto and, later, New York University. While in university she was influenced by gender and minority theories, as reflected in her first film, the short Sally's Beauty Spot (1990). While continuing her studies she produced two more films before taking a five-year hiatus to live in Korea beginning in 1995. After her return, she released another short film and her feature film debut, The Art of Woo (2001). She continues to produce films, although at a reduced rate. Lee's films often deal with gender and racial issues, reflecting the state of East Asians in modern society; a common theme in her work is sexuality, with several films featuring interracial relationships.

== Early life ==
Helen Lee was born in Seoul, South Korea, around 1965, but came to Canada when she was four, a year after her parents. She was raised in Scarborough, Ontario, having moved there in the mid-1970s. As a child, she became interested in black-and-white films from the Golden Age of Hollywood. She later wrote that the 1960 film The World of Suzie Wong spoke to her racial identity as an Asian Canadian, an experience she found to have influenced her filmmaking; excerpts from the film were included in her first short.

Lee began her tertiary studies at the University of Western Ontario, taking art studio and business courses, before transferring to the University of Toronto; there she majored in English literature and film studies. By 1989 she was attending New York University (NYU), studying under Homi K. Bhabha, Faye Ginsburg, and Michael Taussig, with a scholarship. During this period she was influenced by Trinh T. Minh-ha's paradigms on women and ethnicity, as expressed in the 1989 book Woman, Native, Other: Writing Postcoloniality and Feminism; these were later expressed in Lee's first film. She later described Minh-ha as at one point being her "ultimate role model".

== Early film career ==
Lee made Sally's Beauty Spot, a 12-minute-long short film focusing on a mole on her sister's right breast, for a film editing class at NYU in 1990. For the film she used a second-hand Bolex camera and edited it with a Steenbeck editing suite. She later recalled that she recorded the film while in her pyjamas. The production cost a total of $4,000. Fellow Canadian filmmaker David Weaver described it as sexualizing Sally's body, something that Lee had not intended. The film was first screened at the Festival of Festivals in Toronto. After graduation, Lee attended the prestigious International Study Program at the Whitney Museum of American Art before returning to Canada.

In 1992 Lee made the forty-minute long film My Niagara, which featured scenes shot in Japan that were reminiscent of home movies; the effect was obtained by filming in Super 8 Kodachrome, then transferring it to 16 mm film. Filmed in Etobicoke, Ontario, at the childhood home of co-writer Kerri Sakamoto, the film detailed a young Asian-Canadian woman living alone with her father after the death of her mother. Scenes were also shot at the R. C. Harris Water Treatment Plant in Toronto. Francesca Duran in LIFT writes that the film, which had a budget of $80,000, had a theme of cultural displacement, and that My Niagara was well received. That year she also released the three-minute To Sir With Love.

After My Niagara, Lee took a position as a director observer on the set of Atom Egoyan's Exotica, and then enrol at a summer program at the Canadian Film Centre (CFC). Meanwhile, she worked as a film and music critic for Now and extensively wrote about films for other publications. She took further studies at the Banff Centre for the Arts in Banff, Alberta, before returning to the CFC as a director residency. She continued to be involved with the American company Women Make Movies, a distributor of feminist media, which she had become involved with while at NYU.

In 1995 Lee released the 26-minute-long Prey, starring Adam Beach and Sandra Oh; she described the film as a "cross-cultural comedy". The film, which followed a young Korean woman who falls in love with a drifter, was a collaboration with Cameron Bailey and dealt with themes of racial differences, immigration, and social class. The Canadian film critic and experimental filmmaker Mike Hoolboom compared the themes to those of the 1989 Hollywood film Do the Right Thing, writing that had short films been respected it would have been a watershed mark. That year she also released the four-minute M. Nourbese Philip. She then took a five-year hiatus, which she spent in Korea.

== Post Korea ==
In 2000 Lee released the 22-minute short Subrosa, following a woman's search for her mother in Seoul. Intended as a prequel for an undeveloped film entitled Priceless, the film was shot in several formats with a fifteen-person crew, hurriedly recording scenes in public locations. It extensively used character-centred shots, leading to what Lee described as an organic understanding of the character. It also featured on-screen sexual intercourse, framed in a medium shot, which Lee intended as a sign and not simply a sex scene. Although Priceless, meant as a sequel to Subrosa, went through more than thirty drafts, it was ultimately cancelled despite interest from Alliance Atlantis and Citytv.

Anita Lee, co-producer of Priceless, then suggested that Helen Lee make The Art of Woo, a romantic comedy sponsored by the Canadian Film Centre's Feature Film Project; it was Lee's feature film debut. Starring Adam Beach and Sook Yin Lee as Alessa Woo, the Toronto-set film follows an Asian-Canadian art dealer who finds herself living in close quarters with a handsome and talented Indigenous artist but considers him unworthy as he is penniless. The film also stars Don McKellar, Alberta Watson, Joel Keller, John Gilbert and Siu Ta. Executive producer was Peter O'Brian. Original paintings were provided by Kent Monkman to stand in for artworks by Beach's character, Ben Crowchild. Artworks were also loaned by Suzy Lake and then-Power Plant director, Marc Mayer, appears in a cameo. The film had its world premiere at the 2000 Toronto International Film Festival, and was commercially released in Canada in 2001 by "Cineplex Odeon Films. It was invited to the Busan International Film Festival that autumn, continuing its festival run. The original soundtrack – by Ron Sexsmith and Kurt Swinghammer – notably won a Genie Award for Best Achievement in Music – Original Song. That year she also released the three-minute Star.

After The Art of Woo, Lee announced that she intended to adapt Kerri Sakamoto's novel The Electrical Field with the author, and a "romantic thriller". However, neither has yet been released. In 2002 she mounted the video installation Cleaving at the Werkleitz Biennale in Germany. She married around 2008, and that same year released the short Hers at Last, about the interactions of two women living as "outsiders" in Korea. The short was premiered at the Seoul International Women's Film Festival as part of an omnibus entitled Ten Ten, in celebration of the festival's tenth anniversary. The omnibus also featured works by fellow directors Byun Young-joo, Ulrike Ottinger and Lee Su-yeon.

== Themes ==
Race, gender issues, sexual and racial identity often feature in Lee's works. The main characters, up through The Art of Woo, are Asian women that are "caught up in some cross cultural encounter". She writes that she attempts to address these issues through her films in non-didactic ways, such that the "racial melancholia ... are like seepages in the more obvious dramatic or comedic content". She contrasts her films with the 1993 drama The Joy Luck Club, which she considers a film with obvious, easily consumable, ethnic content. She considers the stereotype of Asian women as seductresses, either demure "lotus blossoms" or vociferous "dragon ladies", to be a degenerative one which is "sometimes extremely offensive", but one that has "a cultural memory that demands [the viewer's] attention."

Lee's works often include elements of sexuality in their characterizations. She writes that the main characters of My Niagara and Subrosa reach a greater understanding of themselves and their relationships after sexual encounters. She considers sex as "never the culmination or end point", but a signifier for intimacy. As such, she feels that the more intimate aspects of sex are best conveyed wordlessly, through how it is presented, although she concedes that "talky sex" can be appropriate for romantic comedies.

== Filmography ==
All of the below are short films unless noted.

- Sally's Beauty Spot (1990)
- My Niagara (1992)
- Prey (1995)
- Subrosa (2000)
- The Art of Woo (2001; feature film debut)
- Hers at Last (2008)
- Into Such Assembly (2019)
- Tenderness (2024)
- Paris to Pyongyang (2024)
