= Sook-Yin Lee =

Canadian actress

- 李素英
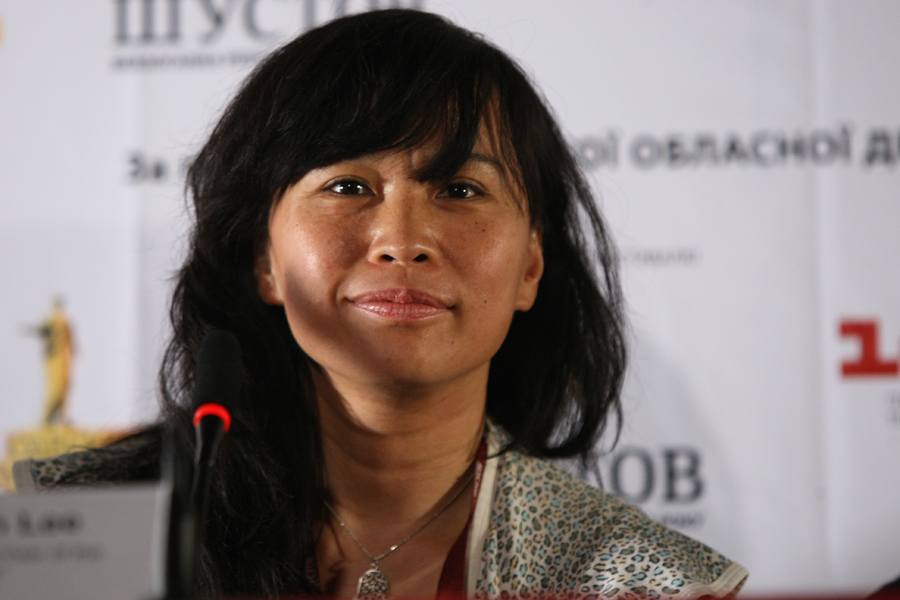
- Lee at the Odesa International Film Festival in 2010
- Born: Vancouver, British Columbia, Canada
- Occupations: Broadcaster; musician; actress; filmmaker; multimedia artist
- Years active: 1980s–present
- Known for: Definitely Not the Opera (host); Shortbus (actress); Paying for It (director)
- Awards: Canadian Screen Award for Jack (2014); Best Director at the Downtown Los Angeles Film Festival for Octavio Is Dead! (2018)
- Website: www.sookyinlee.com

Sook-Yin Lee
- Simplified Chinese: 李素英
Transcriptions
Standard Mandarin
- Hanyu Pinyin: Lǐ Sùyīng

Sook-Yin Lee is a Canadian broadcaster, musician, actress, filmmaker and multimedia artist. She hosted the alternative music show The Wedge on MuchMusic and the CBC Radio One program Definitely Not the Opera from 2002 to 2016. She was the lead singer of the Vancouver band Bob's Your Uncle and later recorded music with Adam Litovitz as Jooj.

Lee starred in John Cameron Mitchell's film Shortbus (2006) and won a Canadian Screen Award for playing Olivia Chow in the television film Jack (2013). She made her feature directing debut with Year of the Carnivore (2009), won Best Director at the Downtown Los Angeles Film Festival for Octavio Is Dead! (2018), and directed Paying for It (2024), an adaptation of Chester Brown's graphic memoir.

== Biography ==
Lee was born in Vancouver, British Columbia. She is the second daughter of father, Leo Lee, from Hong Kong and a mother from Mainland China, Lee was raised as a devout Roman Catholic. Her father was a post-World War II orphan from Hong Kong, and her mother an escapee from Communist China who remained in and out of psychiatric institutions when Lee was young. Lee also has a sister, Deanna, a Vancouver-based artist. She grew up within a strict, secretive and unstable family. When Lee was 15, her parents split up and Lee ran away from home, for a time living on the street before eventually living with a "community of lesbians and artists". Lee is bisexual and gender-fluid.

She had a relationship with the comic artist Chester Brown from 1992 until 1996. She is depicted in several of his comics. He moved to Vancouver for two years to be with her, and moved back to Toronto with her when she became a VJ for MuchMusic. He also drew the cover for her 1996 solo album Wigs 'n Guns. Brown's relationship with Lee is the last boyfriend/girlfriend relationship he had, as he explains in Paying for It. They remain good friends, and Brown has contributed artwork to her productions as recently as 2009's Year of the Carnivore; in 2024, Lee directed the film adaptation of Brown's graphic novel Paying for It.

She was later in a relationship with writer and musician Adam Litovitz, who was also her frequent artistic collaborator, from 2007 until 2018.

She resides in Toronto.

== Career ==
=== Music ===
In the mid-1980s, Lee became the lead singer of Bob's Your Uncle, an alternative rock band from Vancouver. She often brought elements of performance art into the band's shows.

After Bob's Your Uncle broke up, Lee released two solo albums on Zulu Records in the 1990s and continued to work in film and television. She also sang lead in the band Slan. In 2001, singer-songwriter Neko Case covered Lee's song "Knock Loud" on her EP Canadian Amp.

Lee performed improvised sets with keyboardist Adam Litovitz, percussionist Brandon Valdivia and dancer Benjamin Kamino. The group took its name, LLVK, from the initials of the four members' surnames. Lee and Litovitz also formed the duo Jooj and released their first album in 2015. Mint Records released their second album, jooj two, in April 2021.

Lee contributed music to Antiviral and Infinity Pool, both directed by filmmaker Brandon Cronenberg. She announced her solo album 72RHR in March 2026. Hand Drawn Dracula released it on 29 May 2026.

=== Broadcasting ===
==== MuchMusic ====
Lee became a VJ for MuchMusic in 1995, hosting MuchMusic's alternative music show The Wedge.

In 1995, on the day that sexual orientation was held to be protected under section 15 of the Canadian Charter of Rights and Freedoms by the Supreme Court of Canada in the Egan v Canada case, Lee celebrated the decision by kissing a woman on the air. She later appeared on the cover of Xtra! in 1997.

During her last appearance as a MuchMusic VJ in 2001, Lee and her co-host turned their backs to the camera, and mooned the audience on live television.

==== CBC Radio ====
She became the new host of CBC Radio One's Saturday afternoon pop culture magazine radio-show Definitely Not the Opera in 2002. Definitely Not the Opera completed its run in 2016.

In 2016, Lee hosted the 10 episode summer series Sleepover for CBC Radio, which continued as a podcast until 2018.

==== Other television work ====
In the fall of 2004, she hosted a documentary celebrating Terry Fox as part of the CBC Television series The Greatest Canadian.

During the Summer of 2008, Lee was a member of the CBC Olympic broadcasting team for the Beijing games. During the games, Lee filmed a TV spot that touched upon concerns regarding human rights and political issues.

In 2020, Lee hosted Landscape Artist of the Year Canada, a Canadian adaptation of Landscape Artist of the Year, for Makeful.

=== Film work ===
==== Acting ====
While working as a MuchMusic video jockey, Lee was cast as Alessa Woo in Helen Lee's 2001 romantic comedy The Art of Woo after a scheduling conflict made Sandra Oh unavailable. Lee took acting classes with Jacqueline McClintock in Montreal to prepare for the role.

Lee also appeared in John Cameron Mitchell's film Hedwig and the Angry Inch. She played Kwahng-Yi, a guitarist in Hedwig's rock band made up of Korean-born army wives.

In 2003, she became the centre of controversy when Mitchell first announced that he was casting Lee in his film Shortbus (released 2006). Due to Mitchell's announcement that the film was to be sexually explicit in nature – Lee and other cast members perform non-simulated intercourse and masturbation on screen – the CBC initially threatened to fire her.

In making Shortbus, Mitchell sought to make a film about love and sex without censoring itself. Celebrities such as director Francis Ford Coppola, R.E.M.'s Michael Stipe, actress Julianne Moore and artist and musician Yoko Ono, as well as the CBC's listening audience, rallied behind her, and the CBC ultimately relented.

The movie premiered at the 2006 Cannes Film Festival. Her performance in Shortbus earned Lee the 2007 International Cinephile Society Award for Best Supporting Actress.

Lee played Xiu, a rice farmer's wife, in Thom Fitzgerald's 2005 drama 3 Needles, which explores the AIDS epidemic through three stories set in Montreal, China and South Africa.

In 2012, she was chosen to play Olivia Chow in the biopic television film Jack, alongside Rick Roberts as Jack Layton. The film aired on CBC Television in 2013. She subsequently won the 2014 Canadian Screen Award for Best Performance by a Lead Dramatic Actress in a Program/Mini-Series.

==== Directing ====
As a feminist, Lee specifically works on films that discuss feminist and/or racial issues. Escapades of One Particular Mr. Noodle (1990) was her debut as a feminist film director. This film was produced by Studio D, a primarily feminist film production company, as one of the short films in their segment Five Feminist Minutes (1990).

Lee stars in, wrote and directed The Brazilian segment of the 2008 film Toronto Stories.

Her feature film directorial debut Year of the Carnivore screened at the Toronto International Film Festival in 2009. Lee, Litovitz and Buck 65 also collaborated on the film's soundtrack, which garnered a Genie Award nomination for Best Original Score at the 31st Genie Awards.

Lee directed Octavio Is Dead! (2018). It was her second feature film as a director, premiered at the Inside Out Film and Video Festival, and received several nominations at the 7th Canadian Screen Awards.

=== Theatrical work ===
In 2013, Lee wrote and starred in a theatrical performance show How Can I Forget? at Toronto's Rhubarb and Summerworks theatre festivals.

She and Litovitz also staged Morrice Fled: Two Paintings Talk to Each Other, a pop-up performance at the Art Gallery of Ontario based on the art of James Wilson Morrice, in January.

In 2014, Lee choreographed a dance solo for Syreeta Hector as part of On Display for Toronto Dance Theatre. From 2015 to 2017, she created and directed Sphere of Banished Suffering with dancers Jenn Goodwin, Mairi Greig, and Charlie McGettigan with Litovitz developed in residencies with LUFF art+dialogue, Dancemakers, Artscape Sandbox, and premiered at the Festival of New Dance 2017.

In 2019, she wrote and appeared in Unsafe, a documentary theatre production on the topic of censorship, at Canadian Stage.

== Awards and honours ==
=== Wins ===
- 2007 – International Cinephile Society Award for Best Supporting Actress for Shortbus.
- 2014 – Canadian Screen Award for Best Performance by a Lead Dramatic Actress in a Program or Mini-Series for her portrayal of Olivia Chow in Jack.
- 2018 – Best Director at the Downtown Los Angeles Film Festival for Octavio Is Dead!, which also won Best Picture at the festival.

=== Nominations ===
- 2011 – Genie Award nomination for Best Original Score at the 31st Genie Awards for Year of the Carnivore, shared with Adam Litovitz and Buck 65.
- Octavio Is Dead! received several nominations at the 7th Canadian Screen Awards.

== Discography ==
- 1994 – Lavinia's Tongue (Zulu Records)
- 1996 – Wigs 'n' Guns (Zulu Records)
- 2003 – Electric Blues (with Slan, Last Gang Records)
- 2010 – Original Music from and Inspired by the Movie Year of the Carnivore (with Buck 65 and Adam Litovitz, Last Gang Records)
- 2015 – JOOJ (with Adam Litovitz, Last Gang Records)
- 2018 – Octavio is Dead! (Original Soundtrack for the Film with Alia O'Brien, and Adam Litovitz, Last Gang Records)
- 2021 – jooj two (with Adam Litovitz, Mint Records)
- 2026 – 72RHR (Hand Drawn Dracula)

== Filmography ==
- Five Feminist Minutes (1990) (segment "Escapades of One Particular Mr. Noodle")
- Green Dolphin Beat (1994)
- Bad Company (1995)
- Sliders (1995, TV series)
- Boy Meets Girl (1998)
- Hedwig and the Angry Inch (2001)
- The Art of Woo (2001)
- 3 Needles (2005)
- Shortbus (2006)
- Toronto Stories (2008)
- Year of the Carnivore (2009)
- Jack (2013)
- Octavio Is Dead! (2018)
- Death and Sickness (2020)
- Darkest Miriam (2024)
- Paying for It (2024)

== See also ==
- List of female film and television directors
- List of LGBT-related films directed by women
