= Andy Gaus =

American translator & composer (1946-)

Andy Gaus (born 1946) is an American translator and author, known for his 1991 work The Unvarnished New Testament. Gaus is also active in musical theater and has written music for several operas, revues, and musicals.

== Unvarnished series ==
In 1988 Gaus released The Unvarnished Gospels, which led into the 1991 release of The Unvarnished New Testament, which he made in an attempt to render the New Testament in more simple and straightforward modern speech than other Modern English Bible translations. In addition to simpler sentence structure, Gaus also chose to translate a number of words that are important in Christian theology using words that are more commonplace and familiar (such as "doing wrong" for the more traditional word "sin").

The Unvarnished New Testament received criticism from William E. Paul and Robert Bratcher, the former of which stated that "There are places where it seems the translator misunderstood the Greek text ... The Glossary (493-508) has things new and old, some good, some worthless ... I do not think this translation should be recommended". Phillip Goodwin was highly critical of the translation in his 2013 book Translating the English Bible: From Relevance to Deconstruction, writing that Gaus "does not explain to us on what theoretical basis he has approached the work". He further commented that the claims that "what Gaus has done is to translate the Greek as if the nearly two thousand years of Christian history had not occurred" were invalid, as Goodwin felt that this would be an impossible task for any author.

== Bibliography ==
=== As author ===
- The Unvarnished Gospels (1988)
- The Unvarnished New Testament (1991)
- Lessons In Governing: The Inseparable Relationship Between God, Man and Government (2011, with Peter Lawrence Alexander)

=== As translator ===
- Requiem for a Woman, and Selected Lyric Poems (1981, Rainer Maria Rilke)
- Max and Moritz and Other Bad-Boy Stories and Tricks (2003, Wilhelm Busch)

== Theater ==
- Gabriela (1983)
- I Choose to Live Here in the City (1984, revue)
- Emma (1986, music)
