= Year of the Carnivore =

2009 film by Sook-Yin Lee

- Film poster
- Directed by: Sook-Yin Lee
- Written by: Sook-Yin Lee
- Produced by: Trish Dolman
- Starring: Cristin Milioti; Mark Rendall; Will Sasso; Ali Liebert; Luke Camilleri
- Cinematography: Bruce Chun
- Edited by: James Blokland
- Music by: Sook-Yin Lee; Buck 65; Adam Litovitz
- Distributed by: E1 Entertainment
- Release dates: September 10, 2009 (Toronto Film Festival); June 18, 2010 (Canada)
- Running time: 88 minutes
- Country: Canada
- Language: English

Year of the Carnivore is a 2009 Canadian romantic comedy film about a grocery store detective with a crush on a man who rejects her because she has too little sexual experience. It stars Cristin Milioti, Mark Rendall, Will Sasso, Ali Liebert, and Luke Camilleri.

Year of the Carnivore is Sook-Yin Lee's feature directorial debut and it premiered at the Toronto International Film Festival as a Canada First selection.

== Plot ==
Sammy Smalls, a 21-year-old tomboy, works as a grocery store detective at Big Apple Food Town. She tracks down shoplifters and transfers them to her boss Dirk, who beats up the shoplifters as punishment. Sammy dislikes her job, but she can't quit, as she would have to move back in with her overbearing parents. Sammy meets and becomes infatuated with Eugene Zaslavsky, an equally quirky musician who performs outside her grocery store. The two develop a friendship that culminates into a disastrous one-night stand. Eugene, unimpressed by Sammy's immaturity and sexual inexperience, suggests they maintain an open relationship. Sammy concocts a plan to gain sexual experience to impress Eugene, which leads her into many sexual misadventures.

== Cast ==
- Cristin Milioti as Sammy Smalls
- Mark Rendall as Eugene
- Will Sasso as Dirk
- Ali Liebert as Sylvia
- Sheila McCarthy as Mrs. Smalls
- Kevin McDonald as Mr. Smalls
- Patrick Gilmore as Todd
- Luke Camilleri as Jie

== Reception ==
Upon its release in Canada, Year of the Carnivore received polarized reviews.

In his review for The Globe and Mail, Rick Groen wrote that "[Year of the Carnivore is] as sketchy as a failed sitcom, yet with a plot that boasts more wayward tangents than a geometry text." Peter Howell of Toronto Star praised Milioti in his review: "Milioti is great as Sammy, a real find who brings humour and empathy to a character that might normally summon thoughts of a restraining order." Jam! Movies' Jim Slotek rated Year of the Carnivore three out of five stars and wrote that "there's a sweetness to The Year of the Carnivore that survives its flaws. It is not successful as a comedy in the sense of there being a lot of laughs. But it is an interesting and different character portrait."
