= Adam Litovitz =

Canadian musician

- Born: August 16, 1982; North York, Toronto, Canada
- Died: June 17, 2019 (aged 36) Toronto, Canada
- Partner: Sook-Yin Lee (2007–2019)

Adam Litovitz (August 16, 1982 – June 16, 2019) was a Canadian musician and composer. He was most noted for his work on the films Year of the Carnivore, for which he received a Genie Award nomination for Best Original Score at the 31st Genie Awards, and Octavio Is Dead!, for which he was nominated for Best Original Song at the 7th Canadian Screen Awards.

A frequent creative partner of Sook-Yin Lee, with whom he was in a 12-year romantic relationship, the duo also recorded and performed as the band Jooj, which released its debut album in 2015, and a posthumous album entitled jooj two in 2021 on Mint Records

Litovitz, who suffered from depression, was last seen on June 15, 2019, and reportedly died by suicide the next day. According to Toronto Police, his body was found on June 18, 2019.
