= The Beguiling =

Comic shop in Toronto, Ontario

Coordinates: 43.664311°N 79.412038°W

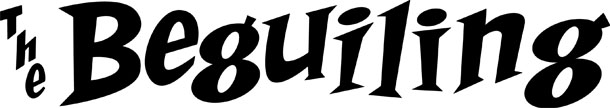
- Type: Private
- Industry: Retail
- Founded: 1987
- Founder: Steve Solomos; Sean Scoffield
- Headquarters: 319 College Street, Canada
- Area served: Toronto, Ontario, Canada
- Products: Comics
- Owner: Peter Birkemoe; Shane Chung
- Subsidiaries: Little Island Comics; Page & Panel: The TCAF Shop
- Website: www.beguiling.com; www.littleislandcomics.com; www.torontocomics.com

The Beguiling is a comic shop in Toronto, Ontario, Canada. It specializes in underground and alternative comics, classic comic strip reprints, and foreign comics. It has built an international reputation for focusing on and promoting non-superhero comics in the superhero-dominated North American comic book market.

The store has made effort to promote comics culture in Toronto by organizing the annual Toronto Comic Arts Festival (TCAF) in coöperation with the Toronto Public Library, which also hosts Page & Panel, a nonprofit shop to support TCAF. The Beguiling also runs a sister store, Little Island Comics, the first North American comic shop aimed exclusively at children.

== History ==
Joe Matt visits The Beguiling with Seth and Chester Brown (from Matt's Peepshow #3, Drawn & Quarterly, 1992).

Founded in 1987 by Steve Solomos and Sean Scoffield on Harbord Street near the University of Toronto in Toronto, Ontario, Canada, The Beguiling quickly built a reputation for the diversity of its stock, focused on art-oriented, avant-garde, underground and alternative comics—"anything that is even peripherally comic book-oriented", according to current owner Peter Birkemoe. In the earliest days, much of the store's income was made through mail order, as the material it dealt in was not mainstream. It also built a reputation for stocking the works of cartoonists such as Chester Brown and Julie Doucet, whose comics most stores would not handle due to the controversial nature of their contents. Well-known Toronto-based cartoonists such as the trio of Brown, Seth and Joe Matt became associated with the store, and sometimes depicted it in their comics. Others such as Jay Stephens made it their shop of choice.

In 1998, Solomos and Scoffield decided to devote their time to creating art (and later film production), and ownership was passed to Peter Birkemoe and Shane Chung, who expanded operations. In 1992 it relocated to a two-floor Victorian building in Mirvish Village in Toronto, and has since branched out into selling to libraries, organizing the Toronto Comic Arts Festival, and running two more locations: Little Island Comics, which caters to children; and the nonprofit Page & Panel in the Toronto Public Library. By 2017, 50% of its sales were to libraries across Canada.

Plans to redevelop Mirvish Village as condominiums pushed The Beguiling to find a new location. It moved 3 January 2017 to a 900-square-foot (84 m^{2}) location at 319 College Street, near the University of Toronto. The new location has since grown to about double the floor space of the previous one.

== Description and reputation ==
The Beguiling is "a store with an agenda", according to Birkemoe, and has been derided for some for its perceived elitism, which stems in part from its sponsoring of Crash, a journal of comics criticism that mainly condemned bad comics. Others, such as comics historian Charles Hatfield, have praised the store for its sense of history, saying, "You always leave the shop with a larger sense of what comics are about." The Beguiling is patronized by an international audience. The store has made the top five retailer list in The Comics Journal, and among the awards it has received, it shared the inaugural Eisner Spirit of Retailing Award in 1993, and it won the Joe Shuster Awards' Harry Kremer Retailer Award in 2010.

== Toronto Comic Arts Festival ==
In 2003, Peter Birkemoe and Chris Butcher of The Beguiling first organized the Toronto Comic Arts Festival (TCAF). Unusual in the world of comics conventions, TCAF is a free-admission event. It focuses on alternative and independent comics, but includes other creative arts besides comics. Rather than being like a traditional comics convention, it is patterned after European festivals such as Angoulême, and the American Small Press Expo.

== Little Island Comics ==
Little Island Comics is a spin-off of the Beguiling aimed at children.

As most North American comic shops focus on teenage and adult customers, and The Beguiling itself mainly on adults, the owners wanted to fill a void by opening the first children's comic shop in North America, and possibly the world. Little Island Comics opened 6 September 2011 at 742 Bathurst Street in the Annex, close to The Beguiling. The shop was designed with children in mind, with bright colours and shelves at child-height.

When Mirvish Village closed in 2017, so did Little Island; several of the staff moved to Page & Panel. Little Island Comics re-opened at 323 College Street in February 2018, next to The Beguiling's new location there.

== See also ==
- The Silver Snail
