= Zulu Records =

Canadian record store and label in Vancouver

Coordinates: 49°16′4.5″N 123°8′58.8″W

Zulu Records is a Canadian record store and independent record label, based in Vancouver, British Columbia, that sells new and used CDs, LPs, 45s, turntables and concert tickets and is currently located at 1972 West 4th Avenue. One of the most famous independent record stores in Canada, Zulu was a finalist in CBC Radio 3's Searchlight contest to name Canada's best record store.

== History ==
Zulu Records was started in 1981 by Grant McDonagh, who had been an employee of Quintessence Records. When Quintessence Records ceased operations as both an independent record store and independent record label, McDonagh continued operations in a similar fashion, as Zulu Records.

Zulu frequently hosts free in-store performances which have included Julie Doiron, Billy Bragg, Dean Wareham, Chad VanGaalen, The XX, Kurt Vile, Lou Barlow, Kid Koala, Jay Reatard, Grouper, José González, Superchunk, Hawksley Workman, The War on Drugs, Rodriguez, Jonathan Richman, Yo La Tengo and Frog Eyes among others.

In 2011, Zulu Records began selling DVDs and Blu-rays in partnership with Videomatica video store. However, in March 2021, Videomatica moved out of Zulu Records and into their own space.

Zulu Records has often been called the birthplace of the indie rock genre "Cuddlecore" as the term was coined by long term employee and local indie music hero Nicolas Bragg, best known for his work as a guitarist in the Vancouver rock group Destroyer. In addition to Bragg, Zulu has housed many employees who have played in legendary Vancouver bands. These include: Cub, The Christa Min, The Nasty On, The Cinch, Anemones, The Book of Lists, Weed, Ali Milner, Fuck Me USA, The Shilohs, Victoria, Victoria!, Leviathans, Cowards, Womankind, Pink Mountaintops, Baron Samedi, Connecticut, Magneticring, Blaise Pascal, Blues Crab, Old Mutton and others.

In the early 2000s, Zulu employees formed a super-group amongst themselves known as The Countless Jibes. The band is best remembered for their multitude of members (often up to ten), multiple guitar attack and such classic rock gems as "Jibes Alright", "Jibes'll Ride" and "Going For Dead". Throughout the years they have shared the stage with many successful bands including Mudhoney, The Decemberists and The Walkmen. Unfortunately due to the vacation of key members from the city, most notably lead vocalist Jason Grimmer and bassist Steven Balogh, the Jibes disbanded in late 2008. Talks of a reunion have occurred in passing but no plans have been made yet.

In 2011 Zulu celebrated 30 years in business.

== Record label ==
The store also previously operated an independent record label, releasing albums by Vancouver artists such as Bob's Your Uncle, Sook-Yin Lee, Slow, Nomeansno and Perfume Tree as well as compilations by The Pointed Sticks, Young Canadians and The Modernettes.
