= Mary Wept over the Feet of Jesus =

2016 graphic novel by Chester Brown

Mary Wept Over the Feet of Jesus, Chester Brown, 2016, 270 pages

Mary Wept Over the Feet of Jesus is a graphic novel by Canadian cartoonist Chester Brown, published in 2016. The book is subtitled Prostitution and Religious Obedience in the Bible, and is made up of adaptations of stories from the Bible that Brown believes promote pro-prostitution attitudes among early Christians.

== Content ==
As in his previous graphic novel Paying for It (2011), Brown takes a pro-prostitution stance in Mary Wept Over the Feet of Jesus. He claims that his research has determined that Mary, mother of Jesus, was a prostitute, that early Christians practiced prostitution, and that Jesus' Parable of the Talents should be read in a pro-prostitution light. Brown describes himself as a Christian who is "not at all concerned with imposing 'moral' values or religious laws on others" and believes that Biblical figures such as Abel and Job "find favour with God because they oppose his will or challenge him in some way".

Brown adapts the stories or portions of stories of Cain and Abel, Tamar, Rahab, Ruth, Bathsheba, Mary, mother of Jesus, the Parable of the talents, Mary of Bethany, Matthew, and the Parable of the Prodigal Son. Handwritten appendices make up the final third of the book, including commentary on the comics, a 55-title bibliography, and a 20-page comics adaptation of the Book of Job.

== Analysis ==
Brown lays out the simple, precise artwork in a fixed grid of four panels to a page. The dialogue is plain and direct. The cover features a vagina-shaped frame into which Brown incorporates two smiling snakes and an open book, from which red drops fall.

In the book's appendices, Brown puts forth his interpretations of the stories. He argues that prostitution had an honorable place in Biblical society, and that Matthew left clues in his narrative that Mary was a prostitute. Brown details facts from his research that coloured his interpretations, such as that feet was used as a euphemism for "penis". He also tells of where he used artistic license in his retellings, and of errors he made, such as depicting coins at a time when coins had not yet come into use.
