= L'hymne =

Promotional single by Celine Dion and Fred Pellerin

from the album La guerre des tuques 3D
- Language: French
- Released: 19 August 2015
- Recorded: 2015
- Genre: Pop
- Length: 3:03
- Label: Sony Music
- Songwriters: Jorane; Éloi Painchaud
- Producer: Éloi Painchaud

Music video
- "L'hymne" on YouTube

"L'hymne" (lit. 'Hymn') is a French-language song recorded by Canadian singer Celine Dion and Quebecois artist Fred Pellerin. It was released on 19 August 2015 as a promotional single for the animated film La guerre des tuques 3D (2015). Dion also recorded an English-language solo version titled "Hymn", released on 5 February 2016 to promote the English-language adaptation of the film, Snowtime!.

== Background and release ==
In August 2015, it was announced that Dion and Pellerin had recorded "L'hymne" for the soundtrack to La guerre des tuques 3D, a modern reimagining of the 1984 film La guerre des tuques. The soundtrack, which includes French and English songs as well as the film score, was released in Canada on 30 October 2015. It also includes Dion's English-language solo version, "Hymn".

== Chart performance ==
"L'hymne" entered the Canadian Adult Contemporary chart in late October 2015, peaking at number 42 in November and remaining on the chart for six weeks.

== Music video ==
The music video for "L'hymne", directed by Scott Lochmus and Robert Yates, premiered on 14 September 2015. It includes scenes from the film intercut with of Dion and Pellerin recording the track.

== Charts ==
Chart performance
Chart (2015)	Peak position
Canada AC (Billboard)	42

== English version ==
La guerre des tuques 3D was released in Quebec on 13 November 2015, followed by the English-language version, Snowtime!, which opened in Canada and the United States in February 2016. The English version of "L'hymne", titled "Hymn", is performed solely by Dion. The Snowtime! soundtrack was released digitally on 12 February 2016 and on CD on 19 February 2016. "Hymn" was issued as the first promotional single, and its music video premiered on 5 February 2016. In the United Kingdom, the film was released under the title Cleo.

== Release history ==
Release history
Region	Date	Format	Version	Label	Ref.
Canada	19 August 2015	Digital download; streaming	French	Sony	
United Kingdom	5 February 2016	Digital download; streaming	English	Sony	
