= Éloi Painchaud =

Canadian musician

Éloi Painchaud is a Canadian musician from Quebec, best known as a member of the bands Okoumé and Salebarbes with his brother Jonathan Painchaud.

He has also been a composer of music for film. Alongside the band Les Colocs, he won a Prix Jutra for Best Original Music at the 12th Jutra Awards in 2010 for Through the Mist (Dédé à travers les brumes), and he was the co-writer with his wife Jorane of "L'hymne", sung by Fred Pellerin and Céline Dion for the film Snowtime! (La guerre des tuques 3D).

He has been a Prix Jutra/Iris nominee for Best Original Music on two other occasions, receiving nods at the 23rd Quebec Cinema Awards in 2021 for Target Number One with Jorane and Jean-Phi Goncalves, and at the 24th Quebec Cinema Awards in 2022 for The Time Thief (L'arracheuse de temps) with Pellerin.
