= Isabel Richer =

Canadian actress

- Richer in 2025
- Born: June 14, 1966 (age 60); Quebec, Canada
- Occupation: actress
- Known for: Eldorado, Trauma

Isabel Richer (born June 14, 1966) is a Canadian film and television actress from Quebec.

== Career ==
Richer's television roles have included Les Invincibles, Les Soeurs Elliot, Jasmine (1996) and Trauma, and her films have included Eldorado, Babine, Battle of the Brave (Nouvelle-France), The Pig's Law (La Loi du cochon), The Countess of Baton Rouge, The 3 L'il Pigs (Les 3 p'tits cochons), Audition (L'Audition), The Child Prodigy (L'Enfant prodige), Without Her (Sans elle), Ésimésac and The 3 L'il Pigs 2 (Les 3 p'tits cochons 2).

She was a Genie Award nominee for Best Actress at the 16th Genie Awards for her performance in Eldorado, and for Best Supporting Actress at the 30th Genie Awards for her performance in Babine.

== Personal life ==
She was formerly married to actor and film director Luc Picard, until they announced their split in 2013. Their son Henri Picard is an actor.

== Filmography ==
=== Film ===
Year	Title	Role	Notes
1994	Louis 19, King of the Airwaves (Louis 19, le roi des ondes)	Serveuse discotheque	
1995	Eldorado	Roxan	
1996	Mistaken Identity (Erreur sur la personne)	Voix escroqué no 1	
1997	The Caretaker's Lodge (La Conciergerie)	Estelle Artaud	
1997	The Countess of Baton Rouge (La Comtesse de Bâton Rouge)	Paula Paul	
2001	The Pig's Law (La Loi du cochon)	Stéphane Brousseau	
2002	Clearing Skies (Une éclaircie sur le fleuve)	Agnes	
2004	Dans l'oeil du chat	Gégé (Gertrude)	
2004	L'Espérance	Corrine	
2004	L'incomparable mademoiselle C.	Marlène Loiseau	
2004	Battle of the Brave (Nouvelle-France)	France Carignan	
2005	Audition (L'Audition)	Femme au bouquet de fleurs	
2006	Without Her (Sans elle)	Anne-Marie	
2007	The 3 L'il Pigs (Les 3 p'tits cochons)	Geneviève	
2008	Babine	La Sorcière	
2010	The Child Prodigy (L'Enfant prodige)	Colette Ostiguy	
2011	Trash (Décharge)	Madeleine Petrescu	
2012	Ésimésac	La sorcière	
2016	The 3 L'il Pigs 2 (Les 3 p'tits cochons 2)	Geneviève	
2019	Mon ami Walid	Dr. Nadeau	
2023	My Mother's Men (Les Hommes de ma mère)	Simone	

=== Television ===
Year	Title	Role	Notes
1987	Avec un grand A	Julie Côté	2 episodes
1993	Embrasse-moi, c'est pour la vie	Coordinatrice	Television film
1994	The Wizard	Huguette Levers	6 episodes
1995	Les grands procès	Marie-Anne Sclater	Episode: "L'affaire Sclater"
1997	Lobby	Alex Roy	9 episodes
2000	Un gars, une fille	Isabel Richer	Episode: "Au salon 2/En voiture 4/L'ombre de l'épervier"
2005–2009	Les Invincibles	Jeanne Langlois	22 episodes
2006	Vice caché	Martine / "Julie"	9 episodes
2010–2014	Trauma	Julie Lemieux	54 episodes
2013	Mémoires vives	Journaliste	Episode #2.6
2017–2019	Ruptures	Claude Boily	30 episodes
2019, 2021–2022	The Wall	Céline Trudeau	25 episodes
2018	Féminin/Féminin	Isabel	Episode: "Let's Play"
