= Racetime =

La Course des tuques
- Film poster
- French: La Course des tuques
- Directed by: Benoît Godbout
- Written by: Paul Risacher; Claude Landry; Maxime Landry
- Based on: The Dog Who Stopped the War by Rock Demers
- Produced by: Marie-Claude Beauchamp
- Starring: French version: Nicholas Savard-L'Herbier; Mariloup Wolfe; Sophie Cadieux; Gildor Roy; English version: Angela Galuppo; Lucinda Davis; Tod Fennell; Noel Fisher
- Edited by: Robert Yates
- Music by: Dumas; Martin Roy
- Production companies: CarpeDiem Film & TV; Singing Frog Studio
- Distributed by: Les Films Séville; Entertainment One
- Release dates: 7 December 2018 (Canada (French)); 25 January 2019 (Canada (English)); 8 November 2019 (United States)
- Running time: 89 minutes
- Country: Canada
- Languages: French; English
- Budget: $11 million

Racetime (French: La Course des tuques) is a 2018 Canadian animated adventure comedy film directed by Benoît Godbout. A sequel to the 2015 film Snowtime! (La Guerre des tuques 3D), the film focuses on the same group of children organizing a sled race over their winter holiday.

The film's English version premiered in theatres on January 25, 2019. On November 8, 2019, Viva Pictures released the movie on US theaters. The DVD version of the Viva Kids was released eight months later, on June 5, 2020.

== Production ==
The film's French theme song, "Ensemble", was written and recorded by Dumas, while the English translation, "Together", was recorded by Cyndi Lauper. Other songs included in the soundtrack were performed by Alex Nevsky, Garou, Ludovick Bourgeois, Alexe Gaudreault, Corneille, Simple Plan and Lara Fabian.

== Box office ==
The film was listed as the eighth highest grossing Canadian film of 2018 as of December 20; however, by January 1, 2019, it had reached $1.7 million at the box office, surging to fifth place. By March 14, 2019, the film had grossed $2.6 million in Canada.

== Characters ==
Characters		Voiced by	
Original	International	Original	International
Luc	Luke	Nicholas Savard-L'Herbier	Angela Galuppo
Sophie		Mariloup Wolfe	Lucinda Davis
François Les Lunettes	Frankie Four-Eyes	Hélène Bourgeois Leclerc	Lucinda Davis
Pierre	Piers	Sébastien Reding	Tod Fennell
Zac		Mehdi Bousaidan	Noel Fisher
Charlie		Ludivine Reding	Dawn Ford
Lucie	Lucy	Sophie Cadieux	Angela Galuppo
Maranda	Manolo	Anne Casabonne	Sonja Ball
Jacques	Jack	Catherine Trudeau	Sonja Ball
Henri Leroux	Henry	Gabriel Lessard	Heidi Lynne Weeks
Georges Leroux	George	Gabriel Lessard	Heidi Lynne Weeks
Chabot	Chuck	Gildor Roy	Don W. Shepherd
Ti-Guy La Lune	Nicky	Hugolin Chevrette-Landesque or Aline Pinsonneault	Elisabeth MacRae
France	Fran	Aline Pinsonneault	Jenna Wheeler-Hughes
Daniel Blanchette de Victoriaville	Daniel Blanshire from Victoriaville	Esther Poulin	Holly Gauthier-Frankel
