= Snowtime! =

- Film Poster
- La Guerre des tuques 3D
- Directed by: Jean-François Pouliot
- Written by: Normand Canac-Marquis; Roger Cantin; Danyèle Patenaude; Paul Risacher
- Based on: The Dog Who Stopped the War by Rock Demers
- Starring: French version: Nicholas Savard-L'Herbier; Mariloup Wolfe; Sophie Cadieux; Gildor Roy; English version: Angela Galuppo; Lucinda Davis; Sandra Oh; Ross Lynch
- Edited by: Robert Yates
- Music by: Jorane; Éloi Painchaud
- Production companies: CarpeDiem Film & TV
- Distributed by: Les Films Séville; Entertainment One
- Release date: November 13, 2015
- Running time: 82 minutes
- Country: Canada
- Languages: French; English
- Budget: $12.5 million
- Box office: $3.3 million (Canada); CN¥31.5 million (China)

Snowtime! (French: La Guerre des tuques 3D), also released as La Bataille géante de boules de neige in France and Cleo in the United Kingdom, is a 2015 Canadian animated comedy-drama film from Quebec. Directed by Jean-François Pouliot, it is an animated remake of the 1984 film The Dog Who Stopped the War (La Guerre des tuques).

The film inspired the spinoff television series Snowsnaps (Les Mini-Tuques) that premiered in September 2018. A sequel film, Racetime (La Course des tuques), was released in December 2018.

== Plot ==
In a small village, a group of children get the idea to plan and stage a giant snowball fight during winter break over a snow fort, with the group who controls the fort by the end of the break winning. One boy, Luke, is decided to lead one team, but the group cannot decide who will be the opposing team. The group attempt to provoke two other kids, Piers and Frankie, into being the opposing team by pelting them with snowballs, but accidentally pelt Sophie, the new girl, whom Luke has a crush on. Infuriated, Sophie accepts leadership of the opposing team and has Frankie construct an elaborate snow fort.

On the first day of battle, Luke's team is successfully repelled. The following day, one boy, Chuck, constructs snowballs coated with ice, but the team decides not to use them. However, Sophie's younger sister Lucy discovers the iceballs and informs Sophie, spurring her to stage an ambush using snowballs filled with paint. During the attack, Sophie's team manages to steal Luke's bugle, an instrument he kept in memory of his father, who died during a war. Sophie's team gets into an argument with her, resulting in her not showing up the following day, allowing Luke's team to successfully infiltrate the fort and drive off its defenders. Learning of this, Sophie sneaks into the fort at night and takes their flag, despite being ambushed by Luke's group.

To get the feuding groups to reconcile, Nicky and his cousin Daniel feign injury to get the groups to unite. The two groups decide to abandon the war, but Sophie convinces Luke to return the fort to her side for one last battle, as she'd been absent when they first took it. Luke's group recruits the first graders to assist in the assault and utilizes Frankie's stolen plans to bombard the snow fort with giant ice blocks. In the battle that ensues, the fort collapses, crushing Piers' dog Cleo, killing her. A grief-stricken Piers blames Luke for taking the game too far. A remorseful Luke sounds a bugle call as the kids bury Cleo. The two teams, realizing they had let the game divide them, reconcile and tear down the remains of the fort together.

== Production ==
Having earned $3,359,425 in 2015, the film was the highest-grossing Canadian film at the domestic box office during the calendar year, thus winning the Cineplex Golden Screen Award conferred by the Academy of Canadian Cinema & Television. It had its American premiere at the 2016 Sundance Film Festival. The film was released in English Canada on February 12, 2016 and the United States on February 19, 2016.

The soundtrack features many songs by various artists, including two recordings of "L'hymne" by Celine Dion, one English rendition as a solo artist and one French rendition recorded as a duet with Fred Pellerin.

== Characters ==
Characters		Voiced by	
Original	English	Original	English
Luc	Luke	Nicholas Savard-L'Herbier	Angela Galuppo
Sophie		Mariloup Wolfe	Lucinda Davis
François Les Lunettes	Four-eyed Frankie	Hélène Bourgeois Leclerc	Sandra Oh
Pierre	Piers	Sébastien Reding	Ross Lynch
Lucie	Lucy	Sophie Cadieux	Angela Galuppo
Maranda	Manolo	Anne Casabonne	Sonja Ball
Jacques	Jack	Catherine Trudeau	Sonja Ball
Henri Leroux	Henry	André Sauvé	Heidi Lynne Weeks
Georges Leroux	George	André Sauvé	Heidi Lynne Weeks
Chabot	Chuck	Gildor Roy	Don W. Shepherd
Ti-Guy La Lune	Nicky	Hugolin Chevrette-Landesque or Aline Pinsonneault	Elisabeth MacRae
France	Fran	Aline Pinsonneault	Jenna Wheeler
Daniel Blanchette de Victoriaville	Daniel Blanshire from Victoriaville	Esther Poulin	Holly Gauthier-Frankel

== Reception ==
The film has grossed over $13 million worldwide, including CN¥31.5 million in China.

=== Reviews ===
On review aggregator website Rotten Tomatoes, the film holds an approval rating of 74% based on 26 reviews, with an average rating of 6.2/10. On Metacritic, which assigns a normalized rating to reviews, the film has a weighted average score 52 out of 100, based on 11 critics, indicating "mixed or average reviews".
