= Dominique Demers =

Canadian novelist

- Born: 23 November 1956 (age 69); Hawkesbury, Ontario, Canada
- Occupations: Novelist, journalist (former)
- Writing career
- Years active: 1979–present
- Genres: Children's literature, fiction

Dominique Demers (born 23 November 1956) is a French-Canadian novelist and former journalist, best renowned for her Mlle Charlotte novel series. She holds a PhD in children's literature.

== Biography ==
When Demers was seventeen, she moved to Montreal and enrolled at McGill University, where she obtained a bachelor's degree in children's literature. She went on to obtain a master's degree at the University of Québec and a doctorate at Université de Sherbrooke, both in the field of children's literature. Demers also contributed to a postdoctoral study concerning children and the media for the Université de Montréal. She taught at the Collège Charles-Lemoyne.

For fifteen years, Demers worked for L'actualité, Châtelaine, and Le Devoir as a journalist, where her contributions earned her the Judith-Jasmin Award in 1987. In 1991, Demers wrote her first novel, a children's novel titled Dominique Picotée. The first of the "Alexis" series, the story of the novel was based on her three children: Simon, Alexis, and Marie.

Marie-Tempête was adapted into a television movie in 1998, dubbed Un hiver de tourmente, directed by Bernard Favre. Two of her later novels, La nouvelle Maîtresse and La Mystérieuse Bibliothécaire, were adapted into a film in 2002 as La mystérieuse mademoiselle C. The film was directed by Richard Ciupka, with the screenplay written by Demers. A sequel, L'incomparable mademoiselle C., followed in 2004 and is based on Une bien curieuse factrice and Une drôle de ministre. There have also been plans to Maïna on the big screen.

For Radio-Canada, Demers hosted a children's show called Dominique raconte..., where she read approximately 150 books to young viewers. The show ran for three seasons under Téléfiction.

In 1997, the Université de Sherbrooke bestowed upon her the position of Ambassador. In 2003, she was the first literary personality to be honoured by the Université du Québec à Montreal's Faculty of Letters and Communication. Demers was also awarded the Order of Canada in 2004. She was nominated numerous times for the Governor General's Award in 1992, 1993, and 1997.

She currently resides in Montreal with her husband, and spends her time writing in Laurentides.

== Bibliography ==
=== Illustrated children's books ===
- Pétunia princesse des pets
- Lustucru le loup qui pue
- Gratien Gratton prince de la gratouille
- Vieux Thomas et la petite fée
- Annabel et la bête
- L'oiseau des sables
- Aujourd'hui peut-être (also in English: Today, Maybe)
- Le Noël du petit Gnouf
- Le petit Gnouf et la magie de l'hiver
- La vérité sur les vraies princesses
- La pire journée de Papi
- Perline Pompette
- Le Zloukch
- Zachary et son Zloukch
- Le Gloubilouache
- Les Flipattes conteurs
- Le Cornichonnet gaffeur
- Le secret de Petit Poilu
- Petit Poilu chez les pioufs
- Tous les soirs du monde
- Boucle d'Or et les trois ours
- La plus belle histoire d'amour
- Oupilaille et le poil de dragon
- Oupilaille et le vélo rouge
- Le monde des GRANDS
- GÉANT, tu ne me fais p'as peur!
- Le clip de Cendrillon

=== Children's novels ===
- Le secret des dragons
- Le chien secret de Poucet
- Poucet, le coeur en miettes

==== Alexis series ====
- Valentine picotée
- Toto la brute
- Marie la chipie
- Roméo Lebeau
- Léon Maigrichon
- Alexa Gougougaga
- Macaroni en folie

==== Mlle Charlotte series ====
- La Nouvelle Maitresse
- La Mystérieuse Bibliothécaire
- Une bien curieuse factrice
- Une drôle de ministre
- L'Étonnante Concierge
- La Fabuleuse Entraîneuse
- Une gouvernante épatante
- Le secret des dragons

=== Teen novels ===
- L'élu
- Les trois voeux
- La pierre bleue
- Un hiver de tourmente
- Les grands sapins ne meurent pas
- Ils dansent dans la tempête
- Pour rallumer les étoiles
- Ta voix dans la nuit
- L'appel des loups
- Au pays de Natak

=== Adult novels ===
- Là où la mer commence
- Maïna
- Le Pari
- Au bonheur de lire
- Marie-Tempête
- Pour rallumer les étoiles

== Filmography ==
- Un hiver de tourmente - 1998
- The Mysterious Miss C. (La mystérieuse mademoiselle C.) - 2002
- Dominique raconte... - 2003-2006
- The Incomparable Miss C. (L'incomparable mademoiselle C.) - 2004
- Maïna - 2013
