= Lucinda Davis (actress) =

Canadian actress (born 1981)

- Born: July 14, 1981 (age 45); Montreal, Quebec, Canada
- Occupation: Actress
- Years active: 1997–present
- Agent: Agence Reisler

Lucinda Davis (born July 14, 1981) is a Canadian actress. She starred in the role of Tanya Panda on the Canadian youth television series Radio Active.

Davis voiced Layla and Digit in the English version of Winx Club made by Cinélume, the Concubine in the 2008 video game Prince of Persia and Sophie in the English version of Snowtime!. She also played the character 'Major Jones' in the miniseries XIII: The Conspiracy which was released in France in 2008 and in the United States in 2009. Davis is also a theatre actress and in 2015 was nominated for a Montreal English Theatre Award for her performance in Random.

In 2024, Davis garnered widespread acclaim, including an ACTRA nomination, for her portrayal of Mother Gooseberry in the video game The Outlast Trials. The character's distinct personalities have different accompanying voices, contributing greatly to the role's complexity and overall praise for her performance.

== Selected filmography ==
=== Film ===
Year	Title	Role	Notes
2001	Within These Walls	Eliza	
2003	Levity	Clubgoer #7	
2004	The Wool Cap	Jamal's Sister	
2007	Surviving My Mother	Policewoman	
2008	The Cutting Edge: Chasing the Dream	Reporter	
2009	Dead like Me: Life After Death	Reporter	
2012	The Words	Vendor	
2016	Race	Beauty Parlor Boss	
2018	Racetime	Frankie	

=== Television ===
Year	Title	Role	Notes
1997–98	Student Bodies	Monica / Girl / Band Practice Girl	
1998–2001	Radio Active	Tanya Panda	Main cast
2002	Seriously Weird	Fenella Day	
2004–05	Naked Josh	Angela	
2005	Station X	Davis	Host
2005–09	Winx Club	Layla / Digit (Cinélume)	
2006–07	My Goldfish Is Evil!	Desmona	Voice
2006–07	Rumours	Emily Lewis	
2008	Gofrette	Ellie Captor	Voice
2011	Supernatural: The Animation	Missouri Mosely	Voice
2012	Gawayn	Xiao Long	Voice
2017	19-2	Female Cops	Voice
2018	The Detectives	Librarian	
2019	Arthur	Cheik and Cheik's mother	Voice

=== Video games ===
Year	Title	Role	Notes
2005	Prince of Persia: The Two Thrones	Mahasti	
2006	Tom Clancy's Rainbow Six: Vegas	Various	
2008	Prince of Persia	Concubine	
2009	Dance Dance Revolution Winx Club	Layla	
2009	Suikoden Tierkreis	Nhazu / Moana / Lao-Kwan	
2010	Who Wants to Be a Millionaire?	Phone-A-Friend Female	
2011	Deus Ex: Human Revolution (2011)	Jenny Alexander / Sarif Industries Employee / Prisoner	
2012	Assassin's Creed III: Liberation (2012)	Jeanne / Prudence	
2013	Assassin's Creed IV: Black Flag	Abstergo Entertainment Employees / Plantation Slaves / Additional Voices	
2014	Assassin's Creed Rogue	Violet Da Costa	
2015	Assassin's Creed Syndicate	Violet Da Costa	
2016	Deus Ex: Mankind Divided	Various	
2017	Assassin's Creed Origins	Various voices	
2018	Far Cry 5	Various voices	
2018	Far Cry New Dawn	Various voices	
2024	The Outlast Trials	Mother Gooseberry	Character with split personality disorder. Mother Gooseberry is two characters with two distinct voices—Phyllis and Dr. Futterman.

=== Theatre ===
- The Night a Tiger was Captured (Dusk 'till Dawn) - Liangu
- Mad Boy Chronicle (McGill) - Skalde/Chorus
- Nervous Breakdown (Tuesday Night Cafe) - Sonya
- The Art of Dining (McGill Players Theatre) - Hannah Galt
- Tooth and Nail (McGill) - Thandi
- Deven Deadly Sins (McGill Players Theatre) - Chorus
- Yeoman of the Guard (Savoy Society) - Chorus
- Cracked (Black Rabbit) - Chelsea
- The Weir (Whip) - Valerie
- Rocky Horror Live (Rainbow Collective) - Colombia
- The Lady Smith (Black Theatre Workshop) - Cynthia
- Gas (Infinitheatre) - Cole
- Doubt (Centaur) - Mrs. Muller
- The Madona Painter (Centaur) - Mary Louise
- Intimate Apparel (Centaur) - Esther
- Richard III (Metachroma) - Lady Anne
- Duet (Black Theatre Workshop) - Billie (Winner Best Actress - Professional Category 2013 META Awards)
- The Gravitational Pull of Bernice Trimble (Obsidien/Factory) - Sara
- The Book of Bob (Centaur) - God
- Top Girls (Segal Centre) - Patient Griselda / Nell
- Adventures of a Black Girl in Search of God (Centaur/National Arts Centre) - Rainey
- I AM For You (National Arts Centre) - Mariam
- Twelfth Night (National Arts Centre) - Viola
- Halloween Tree (D.B. Clarke) - Sally
- 39 Steps (Centaur) - Clown
