= Snowsnaps =

- Genre: Preschool; Adventure; Comedy
- Created by: Marie-Claude Beauchamp
- Based on: The Dog Who Stopped the War by Roger Cantin; Danyèle Patenaude
- Developed by: Paul Risacher
- Written by: Élise Cartier; Michael Leo Donovan; Michael F. Hamill; Lisa Hunter; Marie-France Landry; Maxime Landry; Penelope Laurence; Patricia Lavoie; Gerard Lewis & Dominic Webber; Allen Markuze; Louis-Martin Pepperall; Paul Risacher; Robert Yates
- Directed by: Benoit Godbout
- Voices of: English: Ella Rose Coderre; Kimia Esfahani; Brandon Lising; Satine Scarlett Montaz; French: Claudia-Laurie Corbeil; Catherine Brunet; Valérie Gagné; Marguerite D'Amours
- Opening theme: "Snowsnaps Theme Song"
- Ending theme: "Snowsnaps Theme Song" (Extended)
- Composer: Daniel Scott
- Country of origin: Canada
- Original languages: English; French
- No. of seasons: 1
- No. of episodes: 26

Production
- Executive producer: Marie-Claude Beauchamp
- Producers: Marie-Claude Beauchamp; Sophie Roy
- Animators: Pushkar Atre; Alexandre Beaulieu; Martin Belisle; Melanie Blanco; Felipe Carpinetti; Amélie Chaput; Oleksandr Cherenkov; Amrit Derhgawen; Nicolas Erdos; Elyse Gervais O'Neill; Yoann Gourru; Denis Herry; Louisa Kerrache; Michael Landry Almeida; Alexandre Lapointe; Hanh-Dao Nguyen; Dominique Minh Tuong Pham Tran; Louis Mousseau; Marie-Éve Racicot; Jean-Philippe Richard; Justine Rissone; Lamia Said; Marco Savignac; Alexis Senécal; Jose Simbulan; Anthony Trefleze; Avnija Viyer; Anthony Wu; Dylan Zhang
- Editor: Robert Yates
- Running time: 5 minutes (ungrouped); 11 minutes (grouped)
- Production companies: Carpediem Film & TV; Singing Frog Studio; Corus Entertainment; Technicolor Creative Services Montreal

Original release
- Network: Télétoon / Treehouse TV
- Release: September 1 – November 25, 2018

Related
- Snowtime!

Snowsnaps (French: Les Mini-Tuques, "The Mini Toques") is a Canadian animated television series. It is a preschool-aimed spinoff of the 2015 film Snowtime! (La Guerre des Tuques 3D), itself an animated remake of the 1984 live-action The Dog Who Stopped the War (La Guerre des Tuques) movie. Produced by Carpediem Film & TV in collaboration with the animation studio Singing Frog and broadcaster Corus Entertainment, the series premiered September 1, 2018 in Canada on Télétoon, La Chaîne Disney and Treehouse TV.

== Plot ==
Violet, Tomas, Sami and Kiki are four six-year-old friends whose activities center on play and imagination, particularly outdoor activities such as playing in the snow. The characters frequently engage in role-play and imaginative games.

== Characters ==
- Violet (voiced by Satine Scarlett Montaz) is the game master. She is a free thinker who refuses to follow the herd, has tons of wit and tenacity, and a tendency to be self-indulgent – a little Scoundrel. Her games and her behaviour are never mean or cruel, but if she gets into trouble it is due more to her youthful enthusiasm than any malicious intent. She is easily distracted by the sparkles or whatever is pink!
- Tomas (voiced by Brandon Lising) is open-faced and controlled by his heart of gold. Like all Innocents, he is generous and open-minded. He sees both sides of any disagreement. A natural peacemaker with an intense sense of fairness, he cannot stand conflict. Terry the penguin is his favourite toy, what's yours?
- Sami (voiced by Kimia Esfahani) is a smarty pants know-it-all who actually doesn't know it all, but he is still full of voluble explanations – the weirder and more unpredictable the better. He's likely to say or do anything; he loves playing the Fool. His favourite treats are Brussels sprouts and broccoli!
- Kiki (voiced by Ella Rose Coderre) is a daredevil. She's all about movement and physicality. When in doubt, she acts; thinking is for after. She is compelled to triumph even if she does not have the skills. She'll keep on trying until she can make it happen. A soldier who'll take on any mission! One thing is certain, we can always count on Kiki to play!

== Cast ==
Adapted from the ending credits.

- Satine Scarlett Montaz / Marguerite D'Amours as Violet
- Kimia Esfahani / Catherine Brunet as Sami
- Ella Rose Coderre / Claudia-Laurie Corbeil as Kiki
- Brandon Lising / Valérie Gagné as Tomas
- Voice director(s): Richard M. Dumont / Johanne Garneau, Julie Burroughs

== Production ==
A preschool-oriented spinoff of Snowtime! was announced to be in development in November 2015. Snowsnaps was officially unveiled during the 2016 Cartoon Forum in Toulouse, France as the first-ever Canadian submission. The series is distributed as either 26 eleven-minute episodes or 52 five-minute shorts.

For the musical "Shortsnaps" segments, the production crew held open auditions for bilingual singers across Canada in July 2017.

== Episodes ==
=== Series overview ===
Season	Episodes	Originally released	
Season	Episodes	First released	Last released
1	26	September 1, 2018	November 25, 2018

=== Season 1 (2018) ===
- The episodes "1-2-3, Cupcake!", "The Monster", "The Maze", "Knighthood", "What's Your Treasure?", "Winter Games", "Kids vs. Aliens", and "Sami's Pet" were all adapted into books.

No.	Title	Directed by	Written by	Original release date	American air date	Prod. code	US viewers (millions)
1A	"Dunk Master"	Benoit Godbout	Louis-Martin Pepperall and Marie-France Landry	September 1, 2018	TBA	101	N/A
When Terry the toy penguin gets stuck in the hoop, the rescue mission turns into a basketball duel where Kiki whips the others to show off her dunking skills.
1B	"Snoweo Rodeo"	Benoit Godbout	Gerard Lewis & Dominic Webber	September 1, 2018	TBA	102	N/A
After top cowboy Sami loses every event at the snow rodeo, he still manages to save the day.
2A	"1-2-3 Cupcake!"	Benoit Godbout	Maxime Landry and Marie-France Landry	September 2, 2018	TBA	103	N/A
A crazy freeze race with funny rules will determine who gets Violet's most incredibly appetizing cupcake.
2B	"The Haunted Forest"	Benoit Godbout	Lisa Hunter and Marie-France Landry	September 2, 2018	TBA	104	N/A
The girls don't believe Tomas that the forest is haunted until they see a mysterious pinecone creature and they go investigate.
3A	"When Toys Attack"	Benoit Godbout	Penelope Laurence	September 8, 2018	TBA	105	N/A
Sami is freaked out by toys seemingly following him around town.
3B	"Snow Ballet"	Benoit Godbout	Gerard Lewis & Dominic Webber	September 8, 2018	TBA	106	N/A
Violet's brilliantly choreographed snow ballet needs a snow prince whether Tomas wants to be in the ballet or not.
4A	"Winter Games"	Benoit Godbout	Paul Risacher	September 9, 2018	TBA	107	N/A
Violet's groceries soon go missing, and it's up to the bobsleigh team to retrieve them.
4B	"Cold Tows"	Benoit Godbout	Louis-Martin Pepperall	September 9, 2018	TBA	108	N/A
Sami pretends to be too cold to get his friends to pull him home.
5A	"What's Your Treasure?"	Benoit Godbout	Patricia Lavoie and Marie-France Landry	September 15, 2018	TBA	109	N/A
Violet playing pirate inspires a mutiny when Tomas and Sami decide to leave Kiki's game to join Violet's pirate crew.
5B	"The Monster"	Benoit Godbout	Gerard Lewis and Marie-France Landry	September 15, 2018	TBA	110	N/A
When a frozen apple in their ice fort is found half eaten, the gang investigates.
6A	"Fantabulous Four"	Benoit Godbout	Michael F. Hamill	September 16, 2018	TBA	111	N/A
The Snaps play super heroes on a daring super mission to rescue Terry the Penguin.
6B	"Snow Bowling"	Benoit Godbout	Dominic Webber and Marie-France Landry	September 16, 2018	TBA	112	N/A
When Kiki tries to show the others how to bowl in the snow, the attempts of the others all have surprising twists, turns and bounces.
7A	"The Greatest Game Ever"	Benoit Godbout	Michael F. Hamill	September 22, 2018	TBA	113	N/A
Inspired by a lost video game, the kids imagine, create, and play a real-life adventure game.
7B	"The Shootout"	Benoit Godbout	Élise Cartier and Marie-France Landry	September 22, 2018	TBA	114	N/A
Kiki and Violet's competitive hockey shootout gets an extra fruity snow splash as Sami introduces his juice-filled snowballsicles to the game.
8A	"Race Cars"	Benoit Godbout	Gerard Lewis & Dominic Webber	September 23, 2018	TBA	115	N/A
Formula One meets a formula for disaster when Tomas inadvertently gets knocked into the downhill race of the century.
8B	"AbracaTomas"	Benoit Godbout	Michael Leo Donovan	September 23, 2018	TBA	116	N/A
Terry the toy penguin has disappeared, and only a special magic trick can bring him back.
9A	"Hiccup"	Benoit Godbout	Allen Markuze	September 29, 2018	TBA	117	N/A
Kiki is stuck with a pesky case of the hiccups.
9B	"Superhero of the Hill"	Benoit Godbout	Gerard Lewis & Dominic Webber	September 29, 2018	TBA	118	N/A
When a battle for "Super Hero of the Hill" turns into an all-star superheroes wrestling match, Tomas is compelled to overcome his fear of falling.
10A	"The Maze"	Benoit Godbout	Michael F. Hamill	September 30, 2018	TBA	119	N/A
The kids build, shape, and mould a snow-made labyrinthine masterpiece: a maze, in which they then lose themselves in.
10B	"Hats Off!"	Benoit Godbout	Paul Risacher	September 30, 2018	TBA	120	N/A
Tomas' crooked throws are just the ticket to set free Violet and Sami from jail.
11A	"Ice Dragon"	Benoit Godbout	Marie-France Landry	October 6, 2018	TBA	121	N/A
A large icicle hanging off the barn causes a battle.
11B	"Kids vs. Aliens"	Benoit Godbout	Lisa Hunter	October 6, 2018	TBA	122	N/A
Sami tries to contact aliens.
12A	"Winter Beach"	Benoit Godbout	Louis-Martin Pepperall	October 7, 2018	TBA	123	N/A
Tomas' friends create a winter beach.
12B	"Winter Blast"	Benoit Godbout	Michael Leo Donovan and Marie-France Landry	October 7, 2018	TBA	124	N/A
A game of hide-and-seek gets out of control.
13A	"Pinched Pic-nic"	Benoit Godbout	Michael F. Hamill	October 13, 2018	TBA	125	N/A
Tomas searches for some missing treats.
13B	"The Snow Battawawa"	Benoit Godbout	Gerard Lewis & Dominic Webber	October 13, 2018	TBA	126	N/A
A team of filmmakers hunt for the Battawawa monster.
14A	"Lava, Lava Everywhere"	Benoit Godbout	Michael F. Hamill	October 14, 2018	TBA	127	N/A
It's a spectacular race when the schoolyard suddenly turns into a lava pool and the kids race to be the first to reach the school door!
14B	"Knighthood"	Benoit Godbout	Allen Markuze	October 14, 2018	TBA	128	N/A
Queen Violet wants to make Kiki, Sami and Tomas knights, but before they can, they must prove to her that they can work together.
15A	"Off to School We Go"	Benoit Godbout	Maxime Landry	October 20, 2018	TBA	129	N/A
A hopscotch game is taken to new heights as Sami brings along his latest invention that Kiki just can't get enough of!
15B	"Gone to the Dogs"	Benoit Godbout	Penelope Laurence	October 20, 2018	TBA	130	N/A
Violet and Tomas challenge Kiki and Sami to a dogsled race, but with Sami obsessed with playing a dog and with Kiki willing to do just about anything to win, the race doesn't turn out at all like they planned.
16A	"Sticky Snaps"	Benoit Godbout	Gerard Lewis & Dominic Webber	October 21, 2018	TBA	131	N/A
A cool new restaurant runs into a very sticky situation when it gets an extremely picky client: Terry.
16B	"The Weathervane Game"	Benoit Godbout	Louis-Martin Pepperall	October 21, 2018	TBA	132	N/A
After wrongly thinking that Violet had invented a new game where they have to follow a trail of clues that she has left everywhere, Sami, Kiki and Tomas get lost!
17A	"The Tightrope"	Benoit Godbout	Paul Risacher	October 27, 2018	TBA	133	N/A
When Sami, Kiki and Tomas take over Violet's circus game, it isn't too long for the others to figure out that Sami imposes himself to be a silly tyrant ringmaster the others try to override.
17B	"Moon Mission"	Benoit Godbout	Patricia Lavoie	October 27, 2018	TBA	134	N/A
Little did Kiki know that to get the others to her teeter-totter contest she would have to become part of their moon mission!
18A	"Snapshot Hill"	Benoit Godbout	Gerard Lewis & Dominic Webber	October 28, 2018	TBA	135	N/A
When Tomas loses his camera on a sudden slip down a wild sled run in a pirate game, it leads to a full re-enactment of the crime with pirates in tow.
18B	"Hanging Around"	Benoit Godbout	Gerard Lewis & Dominic Webber	October 28, 2018	TBA	136	N/A
When the kids lose a flying disk in the big old haunted tree, they find out that they might be taking on more than they can handle.
19A	"Sami's Pet"	Benoit Godbout	Marie-France Landry	November 3, 2018	TBA	137	N/A
Sami brings his special pet in a box and all breaks loose when Violet sets it free by accident while the gang play a game of Snag the Flag.
19B	"Tall Tale"	Benoit Godbout	Michael Leo Donovan	November 3, 2018	TBA	138	N/A
When Tomas and Sami compete to be the tallest, the girls help them build gigantic towers with wobbly foundations sending them off into a fall that takes them to unforeseen places.
20A	"Surprise!"	Benoit Godbout	Penelope Laurence	November 4, 2018	TBA	139	N/A
Tomas is sad. Violet doesn't want to hang out with him on his birthday, until he realises she's been planning a big birthday surprise.
20B	"It's a Bird?"	Benoit Godbout	Gerard Lewis & Dominic Webber	November 4, 2018	TBA	140	N/A
Sami is taken on a dangerous ride when an incredible piece of art made by Tomas really takes off!
21A	"Hot Chocolate Party"	Benoit Godbout	Marie-France Landry	November 10, 2018	TBA	141	N/A
Violet's hot chocolate party turns Mad Hatter when Sami decides to bring his own life-size cup to the party and loses control as he slides in it.
21B	"Cut and Run"	Benoit Godbout	Allen Markuze	November 10, 2018	TBA	142	N/A
Kiki, Violet and Sami try to help Tomas get over his fear of the barbershop...but nothing goes as planned.
22A	"Snow Golf"	Benoit Godbout	Lisa Hunter	November 11, 2018	TBA	143	N/A
When Sami is counting on his newly-found luck to beat Kiki at golf, he realizes that sports are more about skills, unless you have the right lucky charm.
22B	"Gumball Jamboree"	Benoit Godbout	Patricia Lavoie	November 11, 2018	TBA	144	N/A
It's a race against time! Following Violet's jamboree gumball arrow leads the gang to quirky challenges, and it ends off with a surprising ending.
23A	"Dino Snaps"	Benoit Godbout	Gerard Lewis & Dominic Webber	November 17, 2018	TBA	145	N/A
Discovering rare dinosaur fossils becomes not that much fun when both Sami's and Kiki's competitiveness gets in the way.
23B	"Tag Back"	Benoit Godbout	Gerard Lewis & Dominic Webber	November 17, 2018	TBA	146	N/A
Violet gets very frustrated and angry when Kiki and Sami get caught in an endless "tag back" loop!
24A	"Hockey Knights"	Benoit Godbout	Maxime Landry	November 18, 2018	TBA	147	N/A
When Kiki is cast as the princess-who-rests in a knightly game, she urges her knights to get the magic hockey stick out of the ice block to break Granny Gnome's evil spell.
24B	"Tic Tac Trouble"	Benoit Godbout	Maxime Landry Michael F. Hamill	November 18, 2018	TBA	148	N/A
When Kiki takes a regular game of Tic Tac Toe to make it into a life-sized extreme challenge version of it, she doesn't realise she's really asking for Tic Tac Trouble!
25A	"The Great Pick-Up"	Benoit Godbout	Gerard Lewis & Dominic Webber	November 24, 2018	TBA	149	N/A
Violet turns her chores into a fun high scoring game for her friends until Sami shows up with his annoying whoopee cushion.
25B	"Off Tracks"	Benoit Godbout	Louis-Martin Pepperall	November 24, 2018	TBA	150	N/A
The best train appears off tracks when the kids make one of their own.
26A	"I Spy Sami!"	Benoit Godbout	Robert Yates	November 25, 2018	TBA	151	N/A
Sami acts strangely after discovering a very special, walking mechanical toy in a hollow tree, which he wants to keep for himself. With this, it starts sending the others into a spy mission to uncover Sami's mysterious secret!
26B	"Toothless"	Benoit Godbout	Allen Markuze	November 25, 2018	TBA	152	N/A
When Sami loses his first tooth and keeps losing it over and over again, he sends his friends on a wild tooth hunt to find it.

== Shortsnaps segment ==
For the musical Shortsnaps segment, the production crew had held open auditions for bilingual singers across Canada in July 2017.

- Lyrics, music, and songs by Eloi Painchaud and Jorane.
- Songs sung by Cool Kids

These are the songs used throughout episodes of the show. There are six of them, which are repeated throughout reruns on Treehouse TV. They are directed by Claude Precourt, Robert Yates and Vanessa Isabelle and choreographed by Louis-Martin Charest.

No.	Title	Directed by	Written by	Original release date
1	"The Band"	Claude Precourt, Robert Yates & Vanessa Isabelle	Eloi Painchaud & Jorane	September 1, 2018
2	"Snow Angels"	Claude Precourt, Robert Yates & Vanessa Isabelle	Eloi Painchaud & Jorane	September 2, 2018
3	"The Parade"	Claude Precourt, Robert Yates & Vanessa Isabelle	Eloi Painchaud & Jorane	September 8, 2018
4	"Get Up and Dance"	Claude Precourt, Robert Yates & Vanessa Isabelle	Eloi Painchaud & Jorane	October 14, 2018
5	"Up the Hill"	Claude Precourt, Robert Yates & Vanessa Isabelle	Eloi Painchaud & Jorane	October 20, 2018
6	"Change the World"	Claude Precourt, Robert Yates & Vanessa Isabelle	Eloi Painchaud & Jorane	October 21, 2018

== International broadcast ==
The show originally aired from September 1 to November 25, 2018. The show was moved to two new time slots when it is aired in reruns on Treehouse TV, which is weekday mornings at 8:40 AM and Friday afternoons at 3:02 PM. The show will also be broadcast later internationally.

- Canada
  - Treehouse TV (September 1, 2018 – 2020)
  - Disney Junior sur La Chaîne Disney (September 1, 2018 – August 25, 2019; May 2020 – present)
  - Télétoon (September 1, 2018 – August 25, 2019)
  - TFO
- France
  - Piwi+ (December 1, 2018 – present)
- Germany
  - KiKa (December 25, 2018 – present)
- United States
  - Disney Junior (November 28, 2020)
  - Kids Street
- United Kingdom
  - Sky Kids (January 15, 2021 – present)
- Spain
  - Super3 (2021–present)
