= Ésimésac =

Canadian fantasy drama film

- Film poster
- Directed by: Luc Picard
- Written by: Fred Pellerin; Luc Picard
- Produced by: Luc Martineau; Lorraine Richard
- Starring: Nicola-Frank Vachon; Gildor Roy; Sophie Nélisse; Marie Brassard
- Narrated by: Fred Pellerin
- Cinematography: François Dutil
- Edited by: Yvann Thibaudeau
- Music by: Michel Corriveau
- Production company: Cité-Amérique
- Distributed by: Attraction Distribution
- Release date: November 30, 2012
- Running time: 100 minutes
- Country: Canada
- Language: French

Ésimésac is a 2012 Canadian fantasy drama film, directed by Luc Picard. Although an unofficial sequel to the 2008 film Babine, unlike the earlier film Ésimésac was not directly based on Fred Pellerin's previously published stories; instead, the film's screenplay placed some of Pellerin's established characters in a new original story.

The film stars Nicola-Frank Vachon as Ésimésac Gélinas, a young but physically strong man whose distinguishing trait is that he does not cast a shadow. He convinces the village of Saint-Élie-de-Caxton to plant and maintain a community garden after an economic crisis has left many of the townspeople hungry, but finds himself in conflict with village blacksmith Riopel's (Gildor Roy) plan to focus on building tracks for a railroad.

The film's cast also includes Picard as Toussaint Brodeur, Sophie Nélisse as Marie Gélinas, Marie-Chantal Perron as Jeannette Brodeur, Marie Brassard as Madame Gélinas, Maude Laurendeau as Lurette Riopelle, René Richard Cyr as Méo Bellemare, Alain Sauvage as Le Curé Flambant, Isabel Richer as the Witch, Pierre Collin as Lorenzo Deziel, and Denis Trudel as Hubert.

The film received five Prix Jutra nominations at the 13th Jutra Awards in 2013, for Best Supporting Actor (Roy), Best Makeup (Kathryn Casault), Best Costume Design (Carmen Alie), Best Score (Michel Corriveau) and Best Hairstyling (Denis Parent). Alie won the award for costume design.
