= La Faille =

French Canadian television crime drama

- French: La Faille
- Genre: Thriller; crime fiction; drama
- Written by: Frédéric Ouellet
- Directed by: Patrice Sauvé; Daniel Roby
- Starring: Isabel Richer; Alexandre Landry; Maripier Morin
- Country of origin: Canada
- Original languages: French; English
- No. of seasons: 3
- No. of episodes: 25 (list of episodes)

Production
- Executive producers: Nicola Marola; Charles Lafortune; Sylvie Desrochers; Jacquelin Bouchard
- Producer: Dominique Veillet
- Cinematography: Claudine Sauvé; Simon-Pierre Gingras
- Editors: Michel Grou; Yvann Thibaudeau; Cédric Coussy
- Camera setup: Single-camera
- Running time: 40–45 mins. (per episode)
- Production companies: Pixcom; Quebecor Content

Original release
- Network: Club Illico
- Release: December 12, 2019

La Faille (English: The Flaw) or The Wall (French: Le Mur) is a French Canadian television crime drama series of three seasons, with a total of 25 episodes, which started broadcasting on Club Illico in 2019. The series is written by Frédéric Ouellet, directed by Patrice Sauvé (first two seasons) and Daniel Roby (third season), and produced by Dominique Veillet for Pixcom/Quebecor Content. The first season of eight episodes was broadcast in Canada from December 12, 2019, and in France as The Wall: Cover Your Tracks from April 26, 2020, via 13ème Rue. The second season, La Faille 2 or The Wall: The Chateau Murder (French: Le meurtre du château), of nine episodes was broadcast from October 17, 2021. La Faille 3: La Verger or The Wall: The Orchard, the third and final season of eight episodes, was aired on November 16, 2022.

The first season is set in the mining town of Fermont, north-eastern Quebec, Canada. Fermont's major structural feature is popularly known as the Wall, which comprises self-contained residential, commercial, recreational and educational buildings. In La Faille the main protagonist, detective sergeant Céline (Isabel Richer), is sent from provincial capital Quebec City to investigate the murder of a stripper-prostitute, inside the Wall. Assisting Céline is local uniformed policeman Alex (Alexandre Landry). Céline encounters her estranged daughter Sophie (Maripier Morin) who is married to the mine-owner's son Lou (Jean-Philippe Perras). In France season one's broadcasting was halted in mid-July 2020 when French-Canadian singer-songwriter Safia Nolin aired allegations of sexual assault and racist statements by Morin. Morin publicly apologized, Nolin did not lodge any official complaint and the artistic community pressured Club Illico so that broadcasting was resumed.

During the second season, Céline is back in Quebec City and investigates the murder of a civil engineer – found encased in concrete in a Château Frontenac bathroom. Alex, on compulsory leave for post-traumatic stress disorder, unofficially investigates the case, going undercover at the château. Sophie joins her father William (Bruno Verdoni) to hunt industrial secrets related to the city's major engineering projects. Céline is partnered with rookie detective Daphne (Naila Louidort).

Before filming of the third season began, Morin was removed from the cast, after further allegations of inappropriate behavior had been raised. For the third season, Céline traveled to her fictitious hometown of Applegrove in Eastern Townships (or Estrie). Alex responds to a skeleton found in her uncle's orchard, which is identified as Céline's long-missing grandmother. Céline and Alex are joined by Estrie police officer, Johnny (Didier Lucien). The squad becomes enmeshed in feuds between local families. Complications increase when the squad finds links to the bordering abbey of Saint-Benoît-du-Lac and reinvestigate the historical murder of Céline's cousin.

== Cast ==
Credits:

- Isabel Richer as Céline Trudeau: Quebec City-based Sûreté du Québec (SQ, English: Provincial Police Force of Quebec) detective sergeant, 48-years-old, born in Washington, raised in Applegrove, mother of Sophie, ex-wife of William.
  - Jade Charbonneau as Céline Jolicoeur (16-year-old): cousin and best friend of Véronique.
- Alexandre Landry as Alexandre (Alex) Théberge: Fermont policeman, assists Céline, married to Fabienne, later moves to Quebec City, diagnosed with post-traumatic stress disorder. Becomes homicide detective sergeant.
- Maripier Morin as Sophie Taylor: Ricard Mine's communications officer, married to Lou, Celine's estranged daughter, later returns to Quebec City, resumes contact with her father, William.
- David Savard as Martin Landry: SQ medical examiner, Celine's friend.
- Benoît Gouin as Jacques Larocque: SQ commander, Céline's boss, political appointee.

=== Season 1 additional cast ===
Credits:

- Jean-Philippe Perras as Louis-Philippe (Lou) Ricard: Ricard Mine's director, son of Jules and Diane, Sophie's husband
- Patrick Hivon as Bruno Lamontagne: mine worker, Justine's regular customer, angry and violent father of Anthony and Grégoire (died), Nathalie's ex-husband
- Éveline Gélinas as Nathalie St-Onge: Bruno's ex-wife, Anthony and Grégoire's mother
- Xavier Huard as Alain Turgeon: Fermont police researcher, Nathalie's lover
- Marc Messier as Jules Ricard: Ricard Mine's owner and Fermont's main employer, married to Diane, Lou's father
- Élise Guilbault as Diane Tremblay-Ricard: Fermont mayor, Ricard's wife, Lou's mother
- Stéphane F. Jacques as Marc Desautel: Fermont police lieutenant, Alex and Geneviève's boss
- Alexa-Jeanne Dubé as Geneviève Bédard: Fermont crime scene analyst, Alex' co-worker
- Noah Parker as Anthony Lamontagne: Bruno and Nathalie's elder son, Grégoire's brother
- Marianne Fortier as Raphaëlle Fournier: Justine's younger sister, Anthony's girlfriend
- Denis Trudel as Robert Fournier: mining engineer, Claude's brother, Justine and Raphaëlle's uncle
- Kim Despatis as Fabienne Dubé: Fermont paramedic, Alex's wife, murdered
- Catherine St-Laurent as Léa Valois: Fertek bartender, Justine's friend
- Vincent Kim as Pao Beauchemin: mine worker, Diane's clandestine lover
- Mani Soleymanlou as Dave Bélanger: Fermont computer, phone and electronics store owner, murdered
- Dominique Quesnel as Hélène Fournier: Justine and Raphaëlle's mother, Claude's wife
- Normand Daoust as Claude Fournier: Justine and Raphaëlle's father, married to Hélène
- Mélanie Langlais as Justine Fournier: stripper-prostitute, murdered
- Kim Lavack as Jérôme: Fermont paramedic, Fabienne's co-worker, murdered
- Monique Spaziani as Suzanne Desmarais: mother of murdered Steven Desmarais
- Schelby Jean-Baptiste as Fanette Jasmin: Fermont news reporter, works for Diane

=== Season 2 additional cast ===
Credits:

- Naila Louidort as Daphné Constant: rookie SQ detective, mentored by Céline
- Bruno Verdoni as William Taylor: Céline's ex-husband, speculator, industrial spy, father of Sophie
- Marie Bernier as Sylvie Cadieux: Château Frontenac concierge, Nathan's friend
- Félix-Antoine Duval as Adrien Lacombe: château bellhop, steals from guests, mentors Alex
- Jean Marchand as Hubert Philippin: civil engineer, pled guilty and served time for bridge collapse; researched better construction materials, murdered
- Romane Denis as Joanie Prévost: medical student, bridge collapse survivor, daughter of Samuel, elder sister of dead Felix, stays at château
- Genevieve Boivin-Roussy as Esther Smith: Montréal university lecturer, civil engineer, hired to recommend Quebec's "third link", Hubert's research assistant and lover, murdered
- Bruno Marcil as Samuel Prévost: Joanie's father, won prize of a week's stay at château, assaulted Hubert, fled when under suspicion
- Émile Schneider as Nathan Gignac: tourist taxi driver, friend of Joanie, his sister Anne died in bridge collapse
- Manuel Tadros as Edmond Chamfort: major builder, coerced Hubert into accepting all guilt for collapsed bridge, schemes to recover his reputation, Bernard's father, murdered
- Charles-Aubey Houde as Bernard Chamfort: building contractor, Edmond's son
- Julian Casey as Geoff Peterson: wealthy businessman, owns Château Frontenac, owns construction business, his wife Anne (Nathan's sister) died in bridge collapse
- Amélie Grenier as Patricia Fleury: Joanie's mother, Samuel's wife
- Alice Pascual as Esposito: SQ uniformed police in Céline's squad room
- Macha Limonchik as Monique Desjardins: deputy minister of transport

=== Season 3 additional cast ===
- Didier Lucien as Jean "Johnny" Léger: Applegrove local policeman, assists Alex.
  - Clifford Leduc-Vaillancourt as Johnny Léger (24 year-old): rookie local policeman, investigates Véronique's 1986 murder.
- Gilbert Sicotte as Léopold Jolicoeur: Céline's uncle, brother of Louise and Françoise, father of Véronique.
- David Boutin as Simon Savard-Jolicoeur: Louise's second son, Karen's lover, involved in smuggling across US-Canada border with Sandford.
- Raymond Cloutier as Father Sébastien: Saint Benedict Abbey's abbot, manages finances poorly.
- Maka Kotto as Father Isaac: Sébastien's deputy, takes over after Sébastien's murder.
- Daniel Parent as Kevin Savard-Jolicoeur: Louise's oldest son, married Claire, father of Xavier. Involved in clandestine deals.
  - Ian Thibault as Kevin Savard-Jolicoeur: Claire's fiancé.
- Marcel Sabourin as Father Gabriel Robin: elderly monk at abbey, Marie-Thérèse's lover, Léopold's biological father.
- Dorothée Berryman as Louise Jolicoeur: Céline's aunt, mother of Kevin, Simon and Émile. Lives with Kevin.
- Sébastien Ricard as Damien Morency: cousin of Morency "sisters", Céline's former infatuation, schemes to acquire abbey lands.
- Lynda Johnson as Claire Collins: daughter of local impoverished bluebloods, married Kevin in 1986.
- Debbie Lynch-White as Karen: owns Applegrove hotel restaurant, Simon's lover, involved in clandestine activities.
- Patrick Drolet as Émile Savard-Jolicoeur: Louise's mentally disabled son. Befriended by his cousins Céline and Véronique. Bullied by Morency "sisters", scorned by Simon.
  - Félix-Antoine Bénard as Émile Savard-Jolicoeur in childhood flashbacks
- Phillipe Vanasse-Paquet as Xavier Jolicoeur: Claire and Kevin's son, Simon's cousin, sometime assistant.
- Gary Boudreault as Jacob Duguay: abbey groundsman, handyman and gift shop attendant.
- Emma Elle Paterson as Véronique Jolicoeur: Léopold's 17-year-old daughter, Céline's cousin and best friend.
- Aurélia Arandi-Longpré as Olivia Asmussen: Elena's daughter, young woman held hostage by Simon and Karen. Xavier's love interest.
- Felicia Shulman as Suzan McNeil: farmer, Sandford's ex-wife.
- Charles Papasoff as Sandford McNeil: former local policeman, Johnny's former boss, Suzan's ex-husband. Involved in smuggling with Simon.
- Élisabeth Locas as Marie-Thérèse Jolicoeur: mother of Léopold, Louise and Françoise. Céline's long missing grandmother.
- Marika Lhoumeau as Antoinette Morency: Damien's female cousin, one of the Morency "sisters".
- Maxime Cormier as Francis Morency: Damien's male cousin, one of the Morency "sisters".
- Anana Rydvald as Elena Asmussen: Olivia's mother, convicted arms smuggler, blackmailed by Simon and Sandford.
- Lise Roy as Françoise (Mère de Céline): Céline's long-estranged mother, Léopold and Louise's sister. Attempts reconciliation with Céline.

== Filming ==
Season one was shot mainly in Fermont, some segments were filmed in Saint-Zénon or Terrebonne. Several interior scenes were shot in a disused shopping centre in Saint-Hubert, the Complexe Cousineau. Others were filmed in Quebec City.

== Episode guide ==
=== Season 1 : Cover Your Tracks ===
No. overall	No. in season	Title	Directed by	Written by	Original release date
1	1	"Accidents" (Accidents)	Patrice Sauvé	Frédéric Ouellet	December 12, 2019
Livestream: someone forces a gun at Sophie's temple. Sign: her mother respond alone or Sophie will be killed. 8 days earlier: Alex finds Justine's semi-naked corpse in a ventilation shaft. Jacques sends Céline to Fermont; she meets Alex. Justine's face is obscured under a glued-on Chinese mask. Léa to Bruno: Justine's probably with a client. Bruno was one of her regulars. Marc fobs off Fanette. Diane to Sophie and Lou: murdered female discovered. Jules is annoyed this could disrupt his government funding submission. Geneviève photographs crime scene; Martin arrives. Alex to Céline: Grégoire's death deemed accidental CO poisoning. Martin uncovers Justine's distinctive fingernails. Anthony dislikes Nathalie dating Alain. Bruno to Justine's parents: worried? Claude is dismissive. Léa identifies Justine's fingernails. Martin: Justine also CO poisoning. Police question Bruno: Justine was his alibi when Grégoire died. Alex to Céline: do not provoke people. Mine trucks are being sabotaged. Lou to Sophie: mine's in financial trouble. Justine identified: teeth match dental files. Céline meets Lou and Sophie. Céline is annoyed with Jacques; he knew where Sophie was. Bruno and Lou argue. Lou never told Sophie: Justine was his ex-girlfriend. Raphaëlle snubs Anthony.
2	2	"Relatives" (Les proches)	Patrice Sauvé	Frédéric Ouellet	December 12, 2019
Bruno asks Lou to take him to Fertek. Céline to Alex: Sophie's my daughter. Justine was last seen outside Fertek. Léa to police: after celebrating her birthday, Justine left with an unknown, new Fly-in fly-out (FIFO) man. Léa describes Justine's missing handbag. Hélène views Justine's corpse: becomes overwrought. Martin: handmade mask, child-like paintwork but unusual varnish. Diane barges in, demands information. Céline reveals Justine's corpse to shock Diane. Alex: Diane is Sophie's mother-in-law. Sophie to Lou: Céline will ruin everything, again. Lou tells Sophie: he's Justine's ex-boyfriend. Raphaëlle to police: Justine not careful enough, talked of her "Chinese guy". Dave and Nathalie air suspicious over Bruno. Raphaëlle and Anthony reconcile. Nathalie phones Bruno: you killed our son. Céline to Alex: when interviewing Claude, you will ask tough questions. Child care worker found handbag matching Justine's. One of the children is Sophie's son. Diane asks Fanette to dig into Céline and Sophie. Bruno is arrested for assaulting Bao, whom he believes is the "Chines guy". Walking passed, Bruno tries to convince Nathalie he never killed Grégoire. Céline to Alex: handbag's contents are too new, it is a decoy. Anthony upends Justine's handbag, finds money rolls.
3	3	"First Aid" (Premiers soins)	Patrice Sauvé	Frédéric Ouellet	December 12, 2019
Anthony burns Justine's handbag. Fabienne and Jérôme transport Bao to hospital. Bruno: did not kill Grégoire nor Justine; Justine abused before he met her. Diane leans on Jules to ask Céline for more details. Handbag's three fingerprints: Justine, finder and an unknown third. Grégoire's corpse found in Steven's lockup. Céline gets Sophie to provide Ricard's FIFO list. Marc releases Bruno. Jacques: concentrate on Justine, forget Grégoire. Céline: linked by Bruno. Jacques: avoid "serial killer" speculation. In lockup: recently carved woodwork: "Papa"; treated with same varnish as Justine's mask. Fanette to Diane: details on Céline but nothing new on Sophie. Pao complains to Diane about his injuries. She kisses him and promises they will be together. Lou to Céline: dated Justine for two years. FIFO to Alex: Justine left on a snowmobile with a helmeted driver. Anthony invites Raphaëlle to elope to Montréal. Bruno to Lou: police looking for Steven. Suzanne: Steven was bullied at work; left ten weeks ago. Léa deduces Anthony stole Justine's handbag; blackmails him for half the money. As police approach Steven's shack a snowmobile abruptly leaves. Driver cuts their hand while scrambling away. They find Steven's corpse. Lou arrives home, lies to Sophie: cut from a fishing hook.
4	4	"Listening" (À l'écoute)	Patrice Sauvé	Frédéric Ouellet	December 12, 2019
Céline looks for a pattern in the deaths: Grégoire, Steven and Justine. Alex: shack intruder wanted prospecting gear. Fabienne and Jérôme collect Steven's corpse. Robert warns Jules not to damage workers. Bruno buys replacement phone from Dave. Dave snoops on his customers' devices. Lou calls Bruno to use his storage shed. Claude and Hélène plan Justine's funeral. Sophie asks Lou to demonstrate his abilities to his father. Céline tells Marc not to announce Steven's death, yet. Robert is sent a video of semi-nude Justine wearing Chinese make-up. Raphaëlle has Robert drive her to work. Alain to Alex: Martin confirms CO poisoning killed Steven. Anthony convinces Raphaëlle to leave Fermont. Geneviève: Steven was prospecting and someone recently cleaned his shack. Anthony agrees to meet Léa. Lou puts his snowmobile into Bruno's storage hut. Alex asks Dave about Steven. Jacques is unconvinced that there's a serial killer – no authorization for more resources. Jules organizes a loan: expecting government funding approval. Anthony steals Bruno's truck. Martin: Steven's corpse had long blonde hair on it and perfume. Geneviève: perfume bottle glass at Justine's disposal site. Anthony and Raphaëlle leave. Céline believes the killer is putting his victims out of their misery.
5	5	"Breakdown" (Panne)	Patrice Sauvé	Frédéric Ouellet	December 12, 2019
Anthony and Raphaëlle drive south. Suzanne: Steven did not know any "Chinese guy". He hated vodka, so somebody else drank with him. Dave hears Diane and Bao discussing all three murders. Bruno tells Léa his truck's gone. Fanette bargains with Diane regarding dirt on Sophie. Alain runs scuba diving class. Suzanne identifies Steven. Power outages occur across town. Robert views half-naked video of Justine. Céline and Alex have sex. Anthony and Raphaëlle get to a hotel. Alain and Nathalie have sex. Marc: found handbag and who had it. Sophie to Martin: tell Céline to stay out of her life. Nathalie to police: do not know Anthony's whereabouts. Bruno tells Alain about missing truck. Diane asks Bruno to find out what police know. Geneviève: both Justine's and Steven's phones have spyware. Dave phones someone: worried about installing spyware. Dave to police: Bruno and his gang tormented Steven, gang protected by Lou. Robert recognizes Sophie as lap-dancer. Bruno threatens Alain to tell all about the investigation. Lou's hiding things from Sophie. Alain gives Bruno copy of police files on the murders. Céline determines that the killer chooses people who are already victims. Dave's attacked in his shop.
6	6	"Listening (Part 2)" (À l'écoute (2e partie))	Patrice Sauvé	Frédéric Ouellet	December 12, 2019
Anthony and Raphaëlle are arrested with Justine's cash; then returned to Fermont. Steven's face showed he wore a scuba mask. Alex: Alain ran scuba classes. Diane invites Céline to dinner. Céline and Alex question Alain. His alibi for Justine's murder is Nathalie. Dave's missing. Diane gives Fanette the police files. Fanette barters a national slot for her exposé. Céline tells Anthony: cannot protect Raphaëlle from stealing charges. He agrees they swapped handbags to steal Justine's money. Céline and Alex are seen kissing. Marc: Dave's kidnapper takes him on a snowmobile. To prevent her drug arrest Léa tells police: Bao was Justine's client and Diane's lover. Raphaëlle returns home. Lou takes Steven's folder from his stash. Police interview Bao: he has alibis for murders. Jules to Sophie: too soon to give Lou more responsibilities. Suzanne believes Steven found something on his land claim. Dave's computer handed-in: it has spyware, which Dave used on his customers. Fabienne learns of Alex' cheating. Police listen to Dave's recordings. Fourniers prepare for Justine's funeral. Police discover Justine's semi-nude video. Hélène asks Raphaëlle whether she was a good mother. Raphaëlle: nothing you could have done. Céline arrives at Ricard family dinner, catching Sophie unaware, while Diane smiles.
7	7	"The Chinese" (Les chinois)	Patrice Sauvé	Frédéric Ouellet	December 12, 2019
Diane forces Sophie and Céline to air the reason for their falling out: Céline slept with Sophie's boyfriend to prevent her being arrested during a drug raid. Jules worries that without government help; Chinese investors will get mine cheaply. Hélène accuses Robert of child abuse at Justine's funeral. Céline: Robert is "Chinese guy"; Jules' contact with investors. Fabienne accuses Alex of cheating. Bruno assaults Claude for protecting Robert. Robert: his love for Justine was consensual. Someone listens to Dave's clients. Geneviève finds Robert hanging from his belt. He was overseas when Grégoire died. Fanette's news report: serial killer in Fermont; gives police file details. Dave recorded Lou asking Bruno for storage. At Bruno's storage: Lou's snowmobile, Steven's prospecting gear and scuba mask. Lou bullies Suzanne to sign over Steven's claim but she has a fit. Lou is arrested. Fabienne and Jérôme respond to a call: Jérôme knocked down, Fabienne sees Dave's corpse. Fabienne is abducted because Alex betrayed her. Alex remembers his fishing shack. A woman, Johanne recognises murderer as her brother. At the shack Fabienne is already dead. Céline knows the killer is Alain. Nathalie seductively enters her bedroom but inside is a video of Grégoire dying.
8	8	"It's Christmas" (C'est Noël)	Patrice Sauvé	Frédéric Ouellet	December 12, 2019
Alex sees Fabienne's corpse: goes into shock. Nathalie realizes Alain murdered Grégoire. Geneviève to Céline: Johanne is Alain's sister. Johanne: he was abused by our father; mother killed herself from car exhaust. Diane and Bao sabotaged Ricard Mines to ruin Jules. Diane discards Bao: she wants to control Jules. Bruno tells Anthony: murderer's Alain. Lou tries to rationalize to Sophie why he bullied Steven and Suzanne. Céline figures Alain will go after Sophie. Lou is unconscious, Alain has baby: she must follow instructions. Alex and Céline question Nathalie. She does not know where Alain is. Céline receives livestream link: Sophie's tied up, being gassed. Anthony receives link: recognizes Grégoire's paper from Bruno's lockup. Alain plays Sophie's recording; describing Céline stabbing her father one Christmas. Céline enters lockup zone. Alex goes for an oxygen cylinder. Anthony arrives with an axe. Alain hears noise, calls out to Céline to empty her weapon. Anthony attacks but Alain gasses him. Céline swaps places with Sophie. Anthony takes Sophie out. Alex provides oxygen. Céline convinces Alain to join her. Alex and Anthony try a rescue but are attacked by Alain. Céline kills Alain. Suzanne convinces Jules to join her diamond venture on Steven's claim.

=== Season 2 : The Chateau Murders ===
No. overall	No. in season	Title	Directed by	Written by	Original release date
9	1	"Felix" (Felix)	Patrice Sauvé	Frédéric Ouellet	October 17, 2021
Maid finds Hubert's corpse in concrete in bath. 24 hours earlier: Jacques appoints Céline as Daphné's mentor. William and Sophie discuss preferred "third link": tunnel. Hubert in Esther's room; unwraps small, mounted figurine and ceremonial trowel. Later he stands near memorial for 12 victims. Alex wants active duty. Jacques: take time off for PTSD. Esther's pushed over ferry railing; phone taken. Nathan drops Joanie at château. Céline and Alex are dating; Sophie visits. Joanie's upset after seeing Hubert; takes pills to sleep. Céline and Sophie argue over William: Sophie leaves. Jacques and William dine together. Samuel and Patricia enter Joanie’s room; she's asleep. Nearby, Hubert exits his room. Château upper floor CCTV are inoperative. Sylive checks lobby CCTV: sees Joanie and Hubert recognize each other. Céline to Alex: William stole her police contacts; she almost lost her career. Alex overhears Céline's call to attend Hubert's corpse. William and Sophie observe Edmond and Monique talking. Daphné: no sign of Esther. Alex snoops around château, helps Martin move bathtub. Daphné finds Esther's agenda. Adrien helps Alex get job. Martin finds Hubert's wallet. Céline and Daphné recognize name from bridge collapse. Joanie has nightmare: trapped in car alongside her dying brother, Félix.
10	2	"Filipino" (Philippin)	Patrice Sauvé	Frédéric Ouellet	October 17, 2021
Céline asks Daphné to find anyone connected to Hubert, who stayed nearby. Jacques' concern is for political ramifications of Hubert's death. Esposito finds CCTV of Esther aboard ferry: did not disembark. Samuel controls Joanie's pills. Prévosts learn of Hubert's murder. Bridge collapse: Hubert deemed solely responsible. Edmond, who used inferior materials, uncharged. Edmond and Prévosts stayed at château last night. Céline deduces Hubert and Esther were lovers. William hides his machinations from Sophie. Adrien chastises Alex for sifting through customer's luggage. Alex hides from Esposito, tells Adrien about his PTSD and leave from police duties. Alex stays at Adrien's place, asks Adrien to assist his investigations. Martin: Hubert was severely beaten but died of asphyxiation. He had a ceremonial trowel. Edmond to police: collapse was Hubert's fault. Edmond: knew Esther, but not well. Police query Sylvie about staff entrance, which was left chocked open last night after security camera moved by ice hockey stick. Joanie and Nathan talk about Hubert's death. Alex finds cement bags near château. Daphné notices Céline removed William's name from Esther's agenda but cannot tell Jacques as Daphné would also be removed from case. Esposito: Samuel has run off.
11	3	"Samuel" (Samuel)	Patrice Sauvé	Frédéric Ouellet	October 17, 2021
Joanie: Samuel could have killed Hubert years ago if he wanted to. Patricia: Samuel too soft-hearted to kill anyone. William asks Sophie to spy on Edmond. Samuel stops at Charlevoix for petrol pays by card. Jacques pressures Céline to find the culprit. Hubert anonymously paid $30,000/month. Hubert's apartment has small figurines, his laptop's missing. Hubert and Esther's sexual relationship ended three months earlier. Joanie overhears Céline ask Patricia about Samuel's fishing trips. Adrien and Alex discover Hubert's evidence in a dumpster. Alex tells Adrien to report it to the police but leave him out of it. Samuel misleads police by driving further north, speeding for a camera and then returning towards Charlevoix. Alex comforts Joanie who is having a panic attack. Joanie borrows Nathan's car. Samuel dictates his suicide video on his laptop. Alex' psychiatrist: not ready for active duty, need to sort out memories and guilt over Fabienne's death. Céline and Daphné search for Samuel at a lake, near Charlevoix. Sophie uses a stolen passkey to access Edmond's room; photographs his documents. At the lake Céline and Daphné encounter Joanie. They rescue Samuel, who has attempted to overdose on Joanie's pills. Police see Samuel's knuckles indicating he bashed Hubert.
12	4	"Nathan" (Nathan)	Patrice Sauvé	Frédéric Ouellet	October 17, 2021
Samuel's hospitalized. Céline: he's murder suspect. Nathan and Sylvie conspire. Sophie provides William with Edmond's information. William's acting for a pro-tunnel German consortium. Joanie tells Nathan police arrested Samuel. Esposito: Samuel in coma, possibly brain damaged. Céline cannot believe Samuel killed Hubert alone. William organizes Sophie to join German consortium. Alex gets close to Joanie. William asks Sophie to find how Edmond got support of their competitors. Nathan sees Alex transporting Joanie from hospital. Edmond stole Hubert's computer; asks Bernard to crack its password. Alex takes Joanie to Adrien's; they discuss their PTSD. Nathan breaks into Alex' truck; takes his ID. Alex advises Joanie to tell police all she knows. Céline: Prévosts prize win's bogus. Nathan to police: know Prévosts from bridge victim's meetings. Nathan to Sylvie: Céline knows of their closeness, also Alex's policeman. Sophie sees Alex as a bellhop. Joanie to police: Samuel was in her room with bloodied knuckles, Hubert was obsessed with getting Joanie's forgiveness. Hubert's solicitor booked château room for will reading; invites victim's relatives. Sophie follows Chamforts to Hubert's apartment. She listens when Bernard plays Edmond's confession tape: Edmond was responsible for bridge collapse but coerces Hubert into taking blame.
13	5	"Chamfort and Sons" (Chamfort et fils)	Patrice Sauvé	Frédéric Ouellet	October 17, 2021
After Chamforts leave Hubert's apartment, Sophie gets caught by a police patrol. She claims she's meeting Céline, who confirms the made-up meeting. Nathan tells Joanie he's aware of her closeness to Alex. Esposito: Nathan and Sylvie are concerned that Geoff's arrival will upset their plans. Alex confronts Adrien over his stolen goods. Alex is unable to reveal this to authorities due to his own clandestine investigations. Céline cannot disclose Sophie's appearance at Hubert's apartment since Céline would be taken off the case. Bernard buries Edmond's confession. Samuel revives and tells police that he saw Hubert, assaulted him but left him alive. He also saw a black suitcase in the room, he was watching TV when Hubert died. Police learn about Geoff. Sophie tells William of Edmond's confession. Joanie convinces Patricia that Samuel wanted to confess to assaulting Hubert. William tells Daphné he's an environmentalist; he never met Esther. Joanie to Alex: only Edmond and Esther visited him in prison, Hubert received research funding from an Australian company. Daphné agrees with Céline that William's after something more than lobbying. Nathan sends Joanie: Alex' picture in police uniform. Fisherman finds Esther's corpse under frozen river.
14	6	"Orient Express?" (Orient-Express?)	Patrice Sauvé	Frédéric Ouellet	October 17, 2021
Martin: Esther pushed in; died of thermal shock. Céline to Daphné: Esther had new lover. Hubert's lawyer gives Sylvie will reading attendees. Sylvie to Nathan: Geoff not on list. Joanie tells Alex to leave her alone: knows he's policeman. Only non-relatives on list: Sylvia and Edmond. From Nathan's cab: he knew Esther, he has hockey stick. Geoff gives Bernard ceremonial trowel: invitation to Montcalm room. Adrien records Hubert's will reading, Hubert's mentions confession video, each receives about $120,000 and figurine. Edmond's upset he got nothing. Police take in Nathan and Sophie for further questioning. Esposito: CCTV shows Nathan knew Hubert. Céline asks Nathan to explain why he lied about not knowing Esther or Hubert. Did he kill Hubert? Nathan claims he was framed. Sophie meets Alex to get will recording; they swap information. Nathan had asked Hubert for money to start tourist cab. Hubert advised Esther to find younger man. William blackmails Edmond with snippets of his confession. Monique to Daphné: Esther did not have enough sway on deciding alternative "three link" proposals. Daphné notices Geoff's company is a competitor. Edmond asks William whether he works for Germans. Edmond: Hubert was researching material resilience, which gained interest of Australian competitors.
15	7	"Longitude Latitude" (Latitude, longitude)	Patrice Sauvé	Frédéric Ouellet	October 17, 2021
Nathan was called to château for tourist on night of murder but none appeared. He explains how Regiment Society rents Montcalm Room for interchanges between business and political contacts. Regiment uses ceremonial trowels to identify members. Hubert was expelled after bridge collapse. Nathan refuses to talk about Sylvie. Daphné: William works for German consortium. Geoff inducts Bernard into Regiment. He identifies Jacques as police director. Sylvie: worried of Geoff's revenge because she was Anne's lover. Anne was leaving Geoff when she died by bridge collapsing. Edmond rages at Bernard for not breaking Hubert's password. Céline: murderer killed Esther, took her phone, lured Hubert to her room. Joanie refuses to see Alex. Edmond finally guesses Hubert's password. He watches video of Hubert and Esther in lab. Geoff dismisses Sylvie as concierge. Alex to Céline: worked as château bellhop, found suitcase, Sophie carries gun. Jacques wants police to focus on Nathan. Bernard locates Hubert's lab for Edmond. Sophie follows Edmond into tunnels below tower. Céline to Daphné: discover Esther's unusual destination. Edmond finds Hubert's lab. Céline uses Alex' passkey, enters William's room; caught by William, she slaps him. He will inform Jacques. Sophie's knocked out by murderer.
16	8	"The Lover" (L'Amant)	Patrice Sauvé	Frédéric Ouellet	October 17, 2021
Edmond finds Hubert's notes. Daphné to Céline: snowy field, nothing here, describes towers. Céline: towers have tunnels. Daphné finds Edmond strung up. William files complaint against Céline. Céline to Daphné: Jacques will suspend me but use your intelligence. Nathan and Sylvie suspect Hubert gave Joanie special figurine. Daphné and Céline: Hubert likely found resilient material. Jacques arrives, suspends Céline. As Céline leaves she sees Sophie running off. Céline finds Hubert's computer with password on note. William listens to will reading. Hubert and Esther celebrate successful research. Céline to Daphné: third link's tip of iceberg. Céline visits Alex, asks Adrien to find Sophie's room. Jacques wants to wrap up investigation promptly. Jacques has Céline tailed to Adrien's apartment. Jacques commandeers Adrien. Geoff phones someone to stop working with Adrien. Sylvie visits Prévosts, takes Joanie's figurine. Martin to Jacques: Edmond murdered not suicide. Céline concedes: cannot turn Sophie against William. Sophie poses as art collector to buy Joanie's figurine. Joanie checks their luggage: figurine's gone. Bernard to Daphné: Edmond was not Esther's lover. Jacques breaks Daphné's questioning; Bernard free to go. Nathan and Sylvie believe Joanie's figurine has Hubert's discovery: worth multi-billions. Nathan phones William to sell it.
17	9	"Concrete" (Le Béton)	Patrice Sauvé	Frédéric Ouellet	October 17, 2021
Céline to Alex: Esther told her lover about resilient concrete. Nathan agrees to sell figurine's concrete pedestal for $2,000,000. Adrien watches William for Jacques and Céline. William tells Adrien to drop Céline and only report to him. Martin to Céline: Hubert's notes require example of material to be properly understood. Jacques reinstates Céline; he was pressured by Monique to redirect investigation. Daphné: Sophie tried to buy Joanie's figurine and she was behind fake château prize. Céline to Jacques: must talk to Monique. Nathan and William meet, Sophie knocks Nathan out, steals pedestal. Monique is Adrien's aunt: she protected him, asked him to spy on Esther but Adrien seduced her. Sophie refuses to kill Nathan at William's orders. Adrien shoots William stopping him from killing Nathan. Adrien takes pedestal. He was attempting to impress Monique while working for Geoff. Geoff invites Joanie to Montcalm Room; he wants resilient concrete. Joanie: figurine was stolen. Adrien arrives with pedestal but it shatters when Geoff tests it. Alex tries to talk Adrien down from killing Geoff. Geoff attacks, Adrien shoots him. Joanie gets letter from Bernard explaining where to find Hubert's concrete. Céline and Joanie find sample below victims' memorial plaque.

=== Season 3 : The Orchard ===
No. overall	No. in season	Title	Directed by	Written by	Original release date
18	1	"Marie-Thérèse" (Marie-Thérèse)	Daniel Roby	Frédéric Ouellet	November 16, 2022
Céline finds Marie-Thérèse's skeleton in Léopold's orchard; hears gunshot. Earlier: Céline greets Léopold; later encounters Louise. Léopold spooked by prowler; grabs rifle. Céline returns with groceries. Léopold finds chicken's head and corpse outside. Céline finds skeleton under toppled tree. Léopold's hospitalised by heart problems. Alex drives towards Applegrove. Céline cites Johnny's ineptness. Johnny sees Olivia at Karen's hotel restaurant; meets Xavier. Simon delivers turkeys to Karen. Johnny takes Alex to skeleton. Simon visits Suzan; she's been robbed. Alex: Marie-Thérèse died about 70 years ago. Céline identifies skeleton; but who uprooted tree? At abbey, Sébastien to Isaac: assist Gabriel. Sébastien passes note to Damien. Police: skeleton on abbey's former land. Alex and Céline discuss coincidence that skeleton's revealed same day Céline returned home. Simon to Léopold: Morencys killed Marie-Thérèse. Kevin and Claire analyse skeleton discovery and Damien's role with Sébastien. Boot prints near skeleton backtracked to abbey. Jacob: shovel's stolen. Céline recalls chased by Halloween mask wearer. Johnny to Alex: Jolicoeurs' money from 1920s prohibition; after Marie-Thérèse disappeared in 1953 Morencys took control. Collinses were local impoverished bluebloods until Kevin married Claire in 1986. Céline looks through Véronique's bedroom. Flashback: Céline tells young Johnny: Véronique's dead. Céline blames Johnny and local men who lusted for Véronique.
19	2	"Véronique" (Véronique)	Daniel Roby	Frédéric Ouellet	November 16, 2022
Flashback: Véronique finishes off Céline's Halloween disguise: skeleton; gives Céline pocketknife. Present: Céline believes Johnny destroyed evidence. Alex phones Céline: need new evidence to reopen Véronique's case. Flashback: Céline goes to campsite; remembers Véronique teasing her over Damien. Véronique and Céline quote Macbeth until Damien arrives. Céline running from monster. Later Céline finds Véronique's pocketknife, cigarettes. Fire pit contains melted monster mask; Véronique's rosary beads. Present: Forensics use skeleton's hair to compare with lock of Marie-Thérèse's. Céline to Louise, Kevin, Claire and Émile: police found Marie-Thérèse's skeleton. Isaac snoops on Damien and Sébastien discussing money. Simon vandalises Damien's car. Léopold: Céline will inherit all. Damien asks Morency "sisters" to pick him up. Flashback: Céline smokes; Damien arrives to fish. Damien asks Céline to hang out together. Present: Céline: did Morencys kill Marie-Thérèse? Damien: father said never attacked physically. Damien separated from wife. Police inform Sébastien: Marie-Thérèse's skeleton found on former abbey grounds. Sébastien: Jolicoeurs bought land; ring's Latin inscription from Gospel of John. Céline: Émile cannot read; points to memorised quotes. Simon and Kevin ride quad bikes. Flashback: Céline hears bike roar past; finds Véronique's head hanging from tree; cuts own wrist. Present: Céline shows knife scars.
20	3	"The Cave" (La Grotte)	Daniel Roby	Frédéric Ouellet	November 16, 2022
Sebastien to Gabriel: police found Marie-Thérèse's skeleton. Flashback: Véronique dancing, while Gabriel watches. Present: Léopold shows Véronique's rosary. It had matching bracelet, which someone gave her. Céline shows Louise where skeleton found. Louise relates how Marie-Thérèse thwarted Morencys attempts to smuggle alcohol. Louise refuses to discuss Véronique's death. Xavier and Olivia cycling; she steals Suzan's crossbow and bolts. Simon and Kevin ride quad bikes to US border. Xavier and Olivia arrive at sugar shack where Véronique was decapitated. Elena approaches. Simon expects Sandford but shot fired. Olivia back at Karen's: has cut across shin. Alex hears her crying. Xavier has scratch on cheek, brings Olivia breakfast. Olivia wants medical help. Flashback: Véronique and Céline mind Émile, who runs at Jacob. Present: Céline asks Jacob to open abbey gift shop. Jacob: Véronique's rosary not sold here. She visited abbey for confessor. Alex accesses town's archives: abbey sold land to Marie-Thérèse. Isaac directs Céline and Jacob to grotto to look for Sébastien. Flashback: Céline visits blood-stained sugar shack. Present: Damien takes Céline to grotto. Isaac treats Olivia. Karen learns Xavier took Olivia out last night. Isaac takes Olivia to abbey. Céline and Damien find Sébastien's corpse, pierced by seven arrows.
21	4	"The Naked Monk" (Le moine nu)	Daniel Roby	Frédéric Ouellet	November 16, 2022
Flashback: Véronique and Gabriel share bible readings. Present: Isaac learns Olivia held hostage until Elena's debt to Sandord repaid. Flashback: Sandford asks Isaac where's naked monk? Present: Alex: Véronique killed by local. Simon buries crossbow. Simon regrets working with Sandford. Flashback: Léopold refuses Louise permission for Véronique to permanently look after Émile at Louise's. Simon masturbates while perving at Véronique. Present: Simon and Karen have sex. Louise: ring inscription was Marie-Thérèse's motto. Flashback: Damien approaches Céline and Véronique. He's dressed as monk. They drink alcohol; smoke marijuana. Current: Jacob to Isaac: police at grotto. Isaac reads Sebastien's letter: abbey in severe financial disorder. Céline to Léopold: Marie-Thérèse poisoned by arsenic. Gabriel cries at toppled tree. He authorised abbey land sale. Gabriel's order has same Latin motto. He collapses on Léopold's porch. Léopold admits he's Gabriel's son. Isaac: arrows to chest references Saint Sebastien's martyrdom. Céline phones Isaac: Gabriel's wants last rites. Flashback: Teen Léopold sees Marie-Thérèse drink arsenic. She asks to be buried on abbey grounds. Present: Gabriel: we lied it was rape so her husband would not kill her. Véronique had lover who looked handsome in uniform. Alex to Johnny: Gabriel died. Johnny to Sandford: Alex reopened Véronique's case.
22	5	"A Midsummer Nights Dream" (Le Songe d'une nuit d'été)	Daniel Roby	Frédéric Ouellet	November 16, 2022
Alex wants to interview Françoise; Céline's hesitant. Karen confiscates Olivia's phone. Flashback: Xavier and Olivia on abbey grounds, Olivia has crossbow. Elena sneaks up on Xavier. They hear shot and take cover. Present: Karen threatens Olivia not to leave abbey. Martin to Alex: found bloodied arrow near grotto; different from Sebastien's and not his blood. Alex sees Karen packing Olivia's clothes. Céline delves into Véronique's casefiles. Martin displays hangman's noose beneath Sebastien. Martin: two recent sets of bike tires. Crossbow takes considerable time to fire seven bolts. Damien shredding documents. Louise proposes deal to Isaac. Émile drives off. Claire wants Émile placed in care. Louise recommends Jolicoeurs combine businesses: buy more abbey land. Céline finds Damien's police interview. Simon to police: Damien and Sebastien were seen leaving gay sauna. Flashback: Kevin and Simon meet Sandford; blackmailing Elena into smuggling weapons. Simon shoots Olivia with crossbow; punches Xavier. Current: Céline watches Damien's videotape. He recalls fleeing monster, falling on bloodied deer, found by Suzan. Xavier kisses Olivia. Léopold and Louise hide secrets. Émile circles book's text; leaves page in sugar shack. Flashback: After Léopold and Louise had sex they look outside where Céline and Véronique perform dialogues for Émile.
23	6	"Émile" (Émile)	Daniel Roby	Frédéric Ouellet	November 16, 2022
Flashback: Céline and Émile chat; enter library. Morency "sisters" bully Émile, who brandishes pocketknife. Current: Johnny calls Sandford: Céline suspects something. Elena to Sandford: weapons too heavy; require too many trips. Alex: Damien and Sebastien visited gay sauna. Kevin finds Émile. Suzan describes Olivia stealing crossbow. Damien did not know Véronique's lover. Damien and Céline deduce all three were drugged. Damien's ashamed of running away. Olivia to Xavier: message for Elena's contact. Karen lies to Alex: Olivia left yesterday; not injured. Xavier delivers message to Johnny. Louise asks Simon to attend family meeting. Flashback: Louise catches Simon masturbating outside Véronique's bedroom. Véronique and Simon overhear: Émile is Léopold's son. Simon runs off. Present: Céline visits Véronique's gravesite. Françoise approaches; wants to make peace. Flashback: Céline arrives for Halloween preparations. Véronique phones Françoise: confirms Émile's parentage. Current: Françoise does not know Véronique's lover. Olivia and Xavier have sex. Damien watches Morency "sisters" shooting. Damien advised Sebastien but he chose riskier investments. Gay sauna owned by Damien's clients. Morencys lost opportunity to buy abbey land with Sebastien's death. Morency "sisters" threaten Kevin; he's unable buy abbey land. Léopold has heart attack. Flashback: Near grotto, Louise cuddles bloodied Émile, he clutches Véronique's clothing.
24	7	"At the Window" (À la fenêtre)	Daniel Roby	Frédéric Ouellet	November 16, 2022
Céline realises Émile stopped talking after Véronique died but still understands. Louise invites Céline to family meeting. Xavier and Johnny working against Sandford but cannot agree on arresting Simon. Xavier tells Johnny about Olivia. Flashback: Céline, Damien and Véronique drink vodka. Céline knocked out by monster-masked person. Present: Céline: why no blood tests for Véronique? Johnny: Sandford ruled them out. Elena puts emetics into her food. Johnny warns Sandford: Céline's coming for you. He returns to his estate. Sandford to Céline: Johnny put Véronique's head into freezer; ruined blood samples. Simon: spent night looking for Émile; found at grotto. Léopold and Françoise reconcile; he displays Véronique's costumes including soldier's uniform. Flashback: Sandford orders Johnny to freeze head. Current: Johnny wants revenge on Sandford. Sandford leaving with Elena but she's vomiting so he goes alone. Louise's plan: amalgamate all Jolicoeur holdings; buy abbey lands. Police arrest Sandford while smuggling weapons. Flashback: Louise believes Émile overdosed on medicine, finds Émile. Present: Louise believes Émile killed Véronique. When Émile storms off Céline follows. They run past Damien to sugar shack. Émile mimes looking through window and sees killing. Damien: murderer had accomplice, Damien now remembers two monster-masked people attacking them.
25	8	"Lady Macbeth" (Lady Macbeth)	Daniel Roby	Frédéric Ouellet	November 16, 2022
Karen thanks Xavier for saving Simon from prison. Flashback: Xavier sees Sebastien's murderer driving off on quad bike. Current: Céline to Léopold: Émile did not kill Véronique but visited murder site. Louise paid Sandford to keep Émile out of investigation; paid extra to put head in freezer. Françoise brings Véronique's uniform; recalls Véronique upset after visiting someone near US border. Flashback: Céline spurns Véronique's attempt to talk; Céline's worried Véronique would steal Damien. Present: Johnny: Véronique canceled abortion appointment three months before her death. Véronique's lover killed Sebastien to prevent rest of body being discovered. Alex researches Émile's diazepam. Side effects include amnesia and hallucinations. Céline concludes diazepam added to vodka. Another side effect: pregnant women may miscarry. Louise tells Kevin and Claire: Émile did not kill Véronique. Alex and Céline arrive. Kevin admits to being Véronique's lover; she made his uniform. Flashback: Kevin and Véronique have sex. Present: Claire storms out. Johnny phones Alex: Claire's father paid bribe to freeze head. Émile leads Céline to Véronique's tree. Claire follows. Flashback: Claire adds more diazepam to Véronique's mouth. Kevin: she's dead. Claire chops Véronique's head off. Present: Claire admits to killing Véronique but suicides on diazepam. Léopold returns abbey’s land.
