= Maxim Roy =

Canadian actress (born 1972)

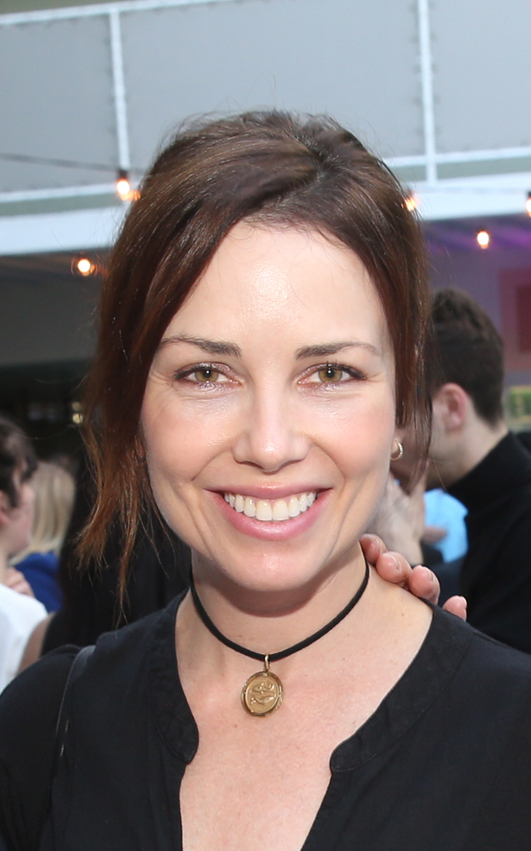
- Maxim Roy at a CFC event in Los Angeles (2016)
- Born: March 7, 1972 (age 54); Rigaud, Quebec, Canada
- Occupation: Actress
- Years active: 1992–present
- Height: 5 ft 7 in (1.70 m)
- Website: maximroy.com

Maxim Roy (born March 7, 1972) is a Canadian actress, who acts mainly in Francophone media. In English, she is best known for playing Detective Isabelle Latendresse in the English-language version of the Canadian police drama television series 19-2, Jocelyn Fray in the fantasy series Shadowhunters, and Mob mistress Michelle in Bad Blood.

== Career ==
Roy has worked in theatre, film and television. Her breakthrough was the lead in a thirteen-episode TV series Au nom du Pere et du Fils. She then went on to do the sequel, Le Sorcier. She appeared in Love & Human Remains and in the television film Platinum. Her theatrical work includes roles in musicals and in the play L'Affaire Tartuffe. She appeared in the Golden Reel winning Les Boys in 1999.

Roy is a founder and co-owner of the film production company Sanna Films. The company's first film, Final Four, was written and directed by Roy. She plays a part in a second production, Lotto 6/66, starring Peter Miller and directed by one of Roy's partners, Dominic James.

== Personal life ==
She is the sister of Québécois actors Gildor Roy, Luc Roy (with whom she starred in Coyote), and Yvon Roy.

== Filmography ==
=== Film ===
Year	Title	Role	Notes
1992	Coyote	Marjo	
1992	Phantom Life (La Vie fantôme)	Student	Uncredited
1997	Les Boys	Sonia	
1998	Fatal Affair	Laura Maddox	
1999	Babel	Fanny Carat	
2000	Artificial Lies	Rachel Hart	
2001	Cause of Death	Missy Baldwin	
2001	Hidden Agenda	Renee Brooks	
2001	Dead Awake	Chaney Streeter	
2003	Outrage	Karen Natov	
2006	Family History (Histoire de famille)	Julie	
2008	WarGames: The Dead Code	Tina Rashe	Direct-to-video
2008	Adam's Wall	Christina	
2009	Romaine 30° Below	Sonia	
2009	Blind Spot (Lucidité passagère)	Maggie	
2010	Stay with Me (Reste avec moi)	Sophie	
2010	The Bait (L'Appât)	Pinard	
2011	Switch	Claire Maras	
2012	The Factory	Nurse Unit Manager	
2016	Succulent & Savory	Alex	
2017	Allure	Eva's mom	
2018	The Fall of the American Empire (La Chute de l'empire américain)	Carla McDuff	
2020	Marlene	Isabel LeBourdais	
2020	Reboot Camp	Grace	
2022	Moonfall	Captain Gabriella Auclair	
2026	Tight Lettuce (Tissé serré)	Lucy	

=== Television ===
Year	Title	Role	Notes
1993	Au nom du père et du fils	Judith Lafresnière	3 episodes
1994	Sirens	Cynthia Doyle	Episode: "Farewell to Arms"
1994	The Wizard	Judith Lafresnière / Suzelle	4 episodes
1995	Forever Knight	Louise	Episode: "Baby Baby"
1995	Zoya	Colette	Television film
1997	Platinum	Sasha Baley	Television film
1999	Misguided Angels	Angel Vanessa	7 episodes
2000	Task Force	Isabel	Television film
2000	Canada: A People's History	Catharine Parr Traill	Television film
2001	Blind Terror	Justine	Television film
2001	He Shoots, He Scores	Michèle Béliveau	10 episodes
2002	Federal Protection	Marjorie Watts	Television film
2002	The Last Chapter	Jennifer MacKenzie	6 episodes
2003	Largo Winch	Claudia Reynolds	Episode: "Skin Deep"
2003	Rudy: The Rudy Giuliani Story	Beth Petrone	Television film
2003	The Last Chapter II: The War Continues	Jennifer McKenzie	6 episodes
2004–2006	ReGenesis	Caroline Morrison	26 episodes
2005	Million Dollar Murder	Lindy Fisher	Television film
2005	Living with the Enemy	Bev Wallach	Television film
2006	Angela's Eyes	Patricia Martin	Episode: "In God's Eyes"
2006	The Wives He Forgot	Alicia Miller	Television film
2007	Superstorm	Josie Abrams	3 episodes
2007	The Dead Zone	Elaine Dowd	Episode: "Outcome"
2008	Would Be Kings	Mickey Bell	2 episodes
2008	MVP	Margot St-Simone	3 episodes
2008	Picture This	Marsha	Television film
2008	Infected	Lisa Wallace	Television film
2008, 2009	Sophie	Louise Brooks	2 episodes
2009	Defying Gravity	Claire Dereux	11 episodes
2011	Look Again	Det. Jennifer Marshall	Television film
2011–2013	Heartland	Miranda	9 episodes
2013	CAT. 8	Dr. Jane Whitlow	2 episodes
2014–2017	19-2	Isabelle Latendresse	24 episodes
2016	This Life	Kate Crowley	Episode: "Joyride"
2016–2018	Shadowhunters	Jocelyn Fray	15 episodes
2017	Bad Blood	Michelle	6 episodes
2018	The Detectives	Detective Keri Harrison	Episode: "Master Manipulator"
2019	Hudson & Rex	Vicky Harrisson	Episode: "The Mourning Show"
2019	Blood & Treasure	Alina	2 episodes
2020	October Faction	Alice Harlow	9 episodes
2020	Mirage	Jennifer	6 episodes
2022	Resident Alien	Violinda Darvell	2 episodes
2024,2025	Shoresy	Jill	4 episodes
