= The Mysterious Miss C. =

2002 Canadian children's comedy film

- French: La Mystérieuse Mademoiselle C.
- Directed by: Richard Ciupka
- Written by: Dominique Demers
- Produced by: Jacques Bonin; Claude Veillet
- Starring: Marie-Chantal Perron; Gildor Roy
- Cinematography: Steve Danyluk
- Edited by: Jean-François Bergeron
- Music by: Audio Z; Gaëtan Gravel; Serge LaForest
- Production companies: Christal Films; Les Films Vision 4
- Distributed by: Chrisal Films
- Release date: 27 March 2002
- Running time: 108 minutes
- Country: Canada
- Language: French
- Box office: $816,407

The Mysterious Miss C. (French: La mystérieuse Mademoiselle C.) is a Canadian children's fantasy-comedy film, directed by Richard Ciupka and released in 2002. The film stars Marie-Chantal Perron as Mademoiselle Charlotte, a quirky supply teacher who transforms the lives of a struggling class of elementary students. The film was adapted from the "Mlle. Charlotte" series of children's novels by Dominique Demers. The film was the sixth highest-grossing Canadian film of 2002.

Demers received a Genie Award nomination for Best Adapted Screenplay at the 23rd Genie Awards. Perron received a Prix Jutra nomination for Best Actress, and Jean-François Bergeron was nominated for Best Editing, at the 5th Jutra Awards.

A sequel, The Incomparable Miss C., was released in 2004.
