= Marie-Chantal Perron =

Canadian actress and fashion designer (born 1967)

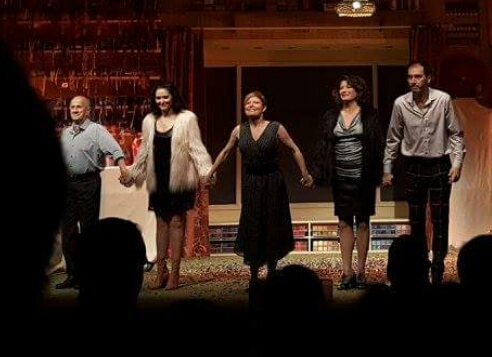
- Born: February 1, 1967 (age 59); Châteauguay, Quebec
- Education: National Theatre School of Canada

Marie-Chantal Perron (born February 1, 1967) is a Canadian actress and fashion designer. She was born in Châteauguay, Quebec.

== Biography ==
Perron studied at the National Theatre School of Canada, graduating in 1989.

She began her career playing in numerous Téléromans and television series, including Marguerite Volant (1996), Le Volcan tranquille (1997) and Réseaux (1998). Additionally, she was active in stage productions, appearing in fifteen plays with directors like Serge Denoncourt, René Richard Cyr ou Robert Gravel.

In 2002, she played the title role of Mademoiselle Charlotte in the children's film La Mystérieuse Mademoiselle C. Her performance earned her a nomination for "Best Actress" at the 2003 Jutra Awards for Quebec cinema. Perron reprised her role in the 2004 sequel L'Incomparable Mademoiselle C..

In 2005, she was cast in the role of Élise Belzile in the television series Nos étés, which she was nominated for "Best Supporting Actress:Drama" at the Gémeaux awards.

In 2011 she won a "Best Actress" Gémeaux award for her role as Annette Léger in the television series Destinées.

=== Fashion design ===
In 205, Perron created a line of clothes called "Dandine". The line, which included seventy different pieces, was sold exclusively at Kamikaze Curiosités, a boutique on Rue Saint-Denis in Montréal.

She followed this with three other collections, all sold at Kamikaze Curiosités. In 2007, she launched her "40 Dresses for my 40 years" collection, a spring-summer collection composed of dresses in shimmering colours. In 2008 she released her "Dandine Wrapped!" collection, composed primarily of Frock coats. Then, in November 2011, she launched her third, "Worthy, by Dandine", composed of long, warm skirts and accessories.

== Filmography ==
=== Film ===
- 2000 : Monsieur, monsieur
- 2001 : Karmina 2
- 2001 : Les Boys 3 : Sylvie
- 2002 : The Mysterious Miss C. (La Mystérieuse Mademoiselle C.) : Mademoiselle Charlotte
- 2004 : L'Incomparable Mademoiselle C. : Mademoiselle Charlotte
- 2006 : A Family Secret (Le Secret de ma mère) : Annie
- 2008 : Borderline : Caroline
- 2008 : Babine : Jeanette Brodeur
- 2010 : The Hair of the Beast (Le Poil de la bête): Émérentienne
- 2012 : Ésimésac : Jeanette Brodeur

=== Television ===
- 1987 – 1990 : La Maison Deschênes : Rita
- 1987 – 1994 : Chop Suey : Clémence Pistacchio
- 1992 – 1995 : Graffiti : Sofia Coronetti
- 1995 – 1996 : Les Héritiers Duval : Sonia Lanthier
- 1995 : Le Sorcier : Rose
- 1996 : Marguerite Volant : Simone
- 1996 : 10-07: L'affaire Kafka : Louise
- 1997 – 1998 : Le Volcan tranquille : Coralie Lebrun
- 1998 – 1999 : Réseaux : Sylvie
- 1999 – 2008 : Histoires de filles : Marie-Jo Desforges-Gauthier
- 2001 : Dans une galaxie près de chez vous : Destinée
- 2003 – 2004 : Hommes en quarantaine : Chantale
- 2005 : L'Héritière de Grande Ourse : Mère
- 2005 : Cover Girl : Catherine
- 2005 – 2008 : Nos étés : Élise Belzile
- 2007 – 2014 : Destinées : Annette Léger
- 2008 : Blaise le blasé : Fanny Cotton (voix)
- 2008 – 2016 : Les Parent : Marie
- 2009 – 2013 : Le Gentleman : Nathalie Cadieux
- 2010 – 2012 : Les Rescapés : Marguerite Panzini
- 2013 : 30 vies : Myriam Gendron
- 2015 : Unité 9 : Madeleine Tessier
- 2018 : Demain des hommes : Élise Gagnon
- 2025 : Sous Un ciel variable (Nouvelle) : Lisette Tanguay
- 2025 :Entre Chien et loup (Nouvelle) Célina L'Heureux Bernier

== Awards and nominations ==
=== Nominations ===
- 2003 : Nomination for prix Jutra in the category "Best actress" for the role of Mademoiselle Charlotte in La Mystérieuse Mademoiselle C.
- 2005 : Nomination for prix Gémeaux in the category "

Best Performance in a Supporting Female Role: Drama" for the role of d'Élise Belzile in the series Nos étés

=== Awards ===
- 2011 : prix Gémeaux for "Best Lead Actress" for the role of Annette Léger in Destinées
- 2008 : Prix Artis, female role in a Quebec television series
