= Macha Limonchik =

Macha Limonchik (born December 17, 1970) is a Canadian actress from Quebec. She is most noted for her roles as Céline in the web series Féminin/Féminin, for which she won the Gémeaux Award for Best Actress in a Web Series in 2015, and Danielle Bergeron in Nouvelle adresse, for which she won the Gémeaux Award for Best Supporting Actress in a Drama Series in 2016.

She also participated as a writer on two projects created collaboratively by their casts: the 1995 film Eldorado, and Robert Lepage's theatrical play The Seven Branches of the River Ota (Les Sept Branches de la Rivière Ota).

== Filmography ==
=== Film ===
Year	Title	Role	Notes
1993	Cap Tourmente	Barbara Kruger	
1993	Women in Love (Les Amoureuses)	Roselyne	
1995	Eldorado	Loulou	
1996	Angélo, Frédo et Roméo	Isabelle	
2001	Sunk		
2001	Karmina 2	Petronia	
2002	Encore dimanche	Sophie Turcato	
2006	À part des autres		
2017	Crème de menthe	Renée's mother	
2022	Ditch	Michèle	

=== Television ===
Year	Title	Role	Notes
1993	Avec un grand A	Micheline	Episode "Bye mon grand"
1993	Scoop II	Waitress	One episode
1994	Jalna		Miniseries
1995	Avec un grand A	Marie	Episode "L’étrangleuse"
1996	Urgence	Cassandra Syrios	One episode
1996	Le retour d'Arsène Lupin	Nadia	One episode
1997	Le Volcan tranquille		
1997	These Children by the Way (Ces enfants d'ailleurs)	Anna Jaworski	Miniseries
1998	L'Ombre de l'épervier		
1998	Jamais sans amour: Un peu, beaucoup, à la folie	Marie-Ève Spénard	
1999	Deux frères	Esther Fennec	
2000	Albertine in Five Times (Albertine, en cinq temps)	Albertine at 30	Television film
2000	The Secret Adventures of Jules Verne	Princess Mariana	One episode
2001	La Vie, la vie	Claire	39 episodes
2004	Samuel et la mer	Suzanne	Miniseries
2005	Pure laine	Chantal	26 episodes
2006 - 2011	Tout sur moi	Macha	39 episodes
2012	En thérapie	Florence	
2014	Nouvelle adresse	Danielle	Two episodes + webseries
2014-2018	Féminin/Féminin	Céline	10 episodes
2016	Fatale-Station	Sarah	10 episodes
2018-19	Trop	Rachel	3 episodes
2019	Le Monstre	Anna	Miniseries
2019	Histoires extraordinaires d'Hospitalières	Sœur Marie-Blanche	One episode + narration
2020	Les Fleuristes		
2021	The Wall (La Faille)	Monique Desjardins	3 episodes
2021	Nous	Gabrielle-Aimée Lehoux	
2022	Complètement Lycée	Deborah Williams	3 episodes
2023	Larry	Lisa Jackowska	
