= Marie Brassard =

Canadian actress, theatrical writer and director

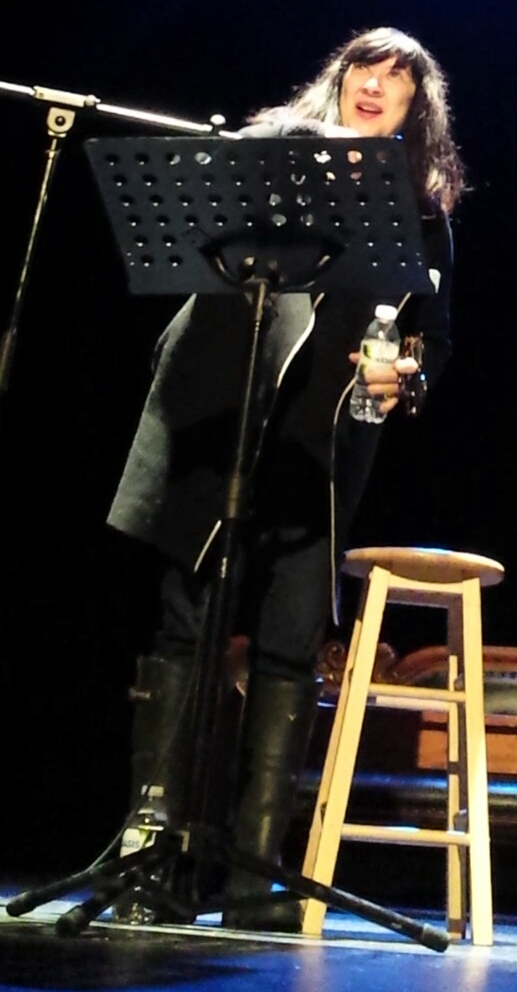
Marie Brassard

Marie Brassard is a Canadian actress, theatrical writer and director. She is known for her work with playwright and actor Robert Lepage and later for her own French and English theatrical pieces, which have been presented in many countries in the Americas, Europe and in Australia.

== Career ==
Marie Brassard performed and co-created with Robert Lepage between the years 1985 and 2000 in theatre (The Dragons' Trilogy, Polygraph, The Seven Streams of the River Ota, The Shakespeare Trilogy: Coriolanus, The Tempest and Macbeth), Geometry of Miracles, and in films ( Polygraph, NÔ ). In 2001, she created her first solo play, Jimmy, within the framework of the Festival TransAmériques (although it appears it must have first been presented at Montreal's Edgy Women festival a couple of months prior).

The success of the play led Brassard to found her own production company, Infrarouge, and to begin to work solo. Since then, in collaboration with guest artists from different disciplines and origins, she has created surreal theatre with innovative video, light and sound installations, including The Darkness (2003), Peepshow (2005), The Glass Eye (2007), The Invisible (2008), Me Talking to Myself in the Future (2010), The Fury of my Thoughts (Nelly Arcan), Trieste (2013), Peepshow (version 2016), La vie utile (Évelyne de la Chenelière), Introduction to Violence (2019), Eclipse (2020) and Violence (2021).

Brassard's plays have been performed in numerous countries in the Americas, Australia and Europe, among other places at the Théâtre de l'Odéon in Paris, The Studio at the Sydney Opera in Australia, the Barbican Centre in London UK, the Haus der Berliner Festspiele and the Sophiensaele in Berlin, the Halle G im Museums Quartier and Brut im Künstlerhaus in Vienna, the Kulturhuset in Stockholm, The Malthouse, Merlyn Theatre in Melbourne and the Teatro Espanol in Madrid.

In 2013, she created a collage of texts by Nelly Arcan and staged the piece, titled in French La Fureur de ce que je pense (The Fury of my Thoughts) at Espace Go in Montreal. The piece was later reprised at the FTA in Montreal and Carrefour in Quebec City and performed on tour in Madrid, Limoges and Amsterdam. In 2017, in company of her team, she staged the piece in its Japanese version. Created and originally performed in Tokyo, the play then toured through Japan in Kyoto, Hiroshima, Toyohashi et Kitakyushu.

Later in her career, Brassard began working as a dance dramaturge and director. She created two dance pieces in collaboration with dancer choreographer Sarah Williams: Moving in this World (2014), developed in residency in Potsdam, was presented in Montreal, Potsdam and in Madrid, and States of Transe (2013). Brassard also choreographed several short pieces in collaboration with a number of choreographers. In different contexts, she worked with Dana Gingras, Anne Thériault, Annik Hamel, Jane Mappin, Anne Plamondon and Karine Denault. She danced in two Isabelle Van Grimde pieces (Perspectives Montreal and The Bodies in Question).

Brassard has appeared in a number of films, including those by Robert Lepage, Michael Winterbottom, Guy Maddin, Ryan McKenna, Denis Côté, Sophie Deraspe, Matthew Rankin and Stéphane Lafleur.

In 2016, she was awarded L'Ordre des arts et des lettres du Québec.

Her filmmaking debut, The Train (Le Train), is slated to premiere at the 2025 Festival du nouveau cinéma.

== Plays ==
- 2021: Violence
- 2020: Eclipse
- 2019: Introduction à la violence
- 2018: La vie utile (texte d'Évelyne de la Chenelière)
- 2017: The Fury of my Thoughts (Japanese version)
- 2015: Peepshow (2015)
- 2014: The Darkness, revisited
- 2013: La Fureur de ce que je pense
- 2013: Trieste
- 2010: Me talking to Myself in the Future
- 2008: The Invisible
- 2007: The Glass Eye
- 2005: Peepshow
- 2003: The Darkness
- 2001: Jimmy

== Film appearances ==
- 1997: Polygraph (Le Polygraphe)
- 1998: Nô
- 2000: The Claim
- 2001: The Pig's Law (La Loi du cochon)
- 2002: Past Perfect
- 2004: Happiness Is a Sad Song (Le Bonheur c'est une chanson triste)
- 2006: Congorama
- 2007: Continental, a Film Without Guns (Continental, un film sans fusil)
- 2008: Babine
- 2008: Cadavres
- 2009: Heat Wave (Les grandes chaleurs)
- 2009: Vital Signs (Les signes vitaux)
- 2012: Ésimésac
- 2012: Where I Am (Là où je suis)
- 2013: Vic and Flo Saw a Bear (Vic+Flo ont vu un ours)
- 2014: Roberta
- 2015: Corbo
- 2022: Viking
- 2022: Mistral Spatial
- 2023: Humanist Vampire Seeking Consenting Suicidal Person (Vampire humaniste cherche suicidaire consentant)
