= Coyote (1992 film) =

1992 Canadian and French comedy-drama film

- Directed by: Richard Ciupka
- Written by: Louise-Anne Bouchard; Richard Ciupka; Richard Sadler
- Based on: Coyote by Michel Michaud
- Produced by: Henry Lange; Richard Sadler; Ronald Brault
- Starring: Mitsou; Patrick Labbé; Jean-Claude Dreyfus
- Cinematography: Steve Danyluk
- Edited by: Jean-Guy Monpetit
- Music by: Reinhardt Wagner
- Distributed by: Alliance Films
- Release date: June 1992
- Running time: 95 minutes (Canada); 99 minutes (UK)
- Country: Canada
- Language: French
- Box office: $228,888 (Canada)

Coyote is a Canadian-French comedy-drama film, directed by Richard Ciupka and released in 1992. The acting debut of pop singer Mitsou, the film starred Mitsou and Patrick Labbé as Louise and Chomi, two Montreal teenagers who fall in love.

The supporting cast also includes Thierry Magnier, Claude Legault, François Massicotte, Jean-Claude Dreyfus, Michel Barrette, France Castel, Angèle Coutu, Patrick Goyette, Luc Roy, Jayne Heitmeyer, Colette Courtois, Sarah-Jeanne Latendresse, Ken Takasaki, Maxim Roy, Caroline Néron, Chantal Fontaine, Roger Briand, Luc Proulx and François Papineau in supporting roles.

== Critical response ==
Paul DeLean of the Montreal Gazette gave the film a mixed review, writing that it was "a rather ordinary little movie, competently executed but too thin in its story line to sustain interest for the duration". He opined that Mitsou's performance was competent, but vastly overshadowed by Labbé's much stronger acting skills.

For The Globe and Mail, Ray Conlogue wrote that "I'm not making fun of the formula, which if employed with drive and energy can produce films that adolescents find reassuring and emotionally satisfying. But here the drive and energy are lacking, and it's obvious from the first encounter between Chomi and Coyote. The two are immediately attracted, they make a date, they go out, they go home, they go to bed. Somehow the only sensible part of the formula - the romantic obstacles that should keep the lovers apart - have been overlooked. These do not crop up until after they're together, and only in an offhand fashion, as if the filmmaker realized that he had to do something to spin things out to two hours."
