= Women in Love (1993 film) =

1993 Canadian film directed by Johanne Prégent

- French: Les Amoureuses
- Directed by: Johanne Prégent
- Written by: Johanne Prégent
- Produced by: Louise Gendron
- Starring: Louise Portal; Léa-Marie Cantin
- Cinematography: François Protat
- Edited by: Dominique Fortin
- Music by: Pierre Desrochers
- Production company: Les Productions du Cerf
- Distributed by: Ciné 360
- Release date: February 24, 1993
- Running time: 99 minutes
- Country: Canada
- Language: French

Women in Love (French: Les Amoureuses) is a 1993 Canadian drama film, directed by Johanne Prégent. The film stars Louise Portal and Léa-Marie Cantin as Léa and Marianne, two friends who are about to turn 40, and are married to David (Kenneth Welsh) and Nino (Tony Nardi) respectively, but are both involved in extramarital affairs with other men due to their dissatisfaction with their marriages.

The cast also includes Sophie Lorain, David La Haye and Macha Limonchik.

== Cast ==
- Louise Portal as Lea
- Kenneth Welsh as David
- Léa-Marie Cantin as Marianne
- Tony Nardi as Nino
- Sophie Lorain as Hélène
- David La Haye as Bernard
- Macha Limonchik as Roselyne

== Awards ==
Pierre Desrochers received a Genie Award nomination for Best Original Score at the 25th Genie Awards. The film was also in contention for the inaugural Claude Jutra Award for best first feature, but did not win.
