= Luc Roy =

- Born: Luc Roy; Quebec, Canada

Luc Roy (born in Quebec, Canada) is a Québécois actor. Luc is the brother of Québécois actors Gildor Roy, Yvon Roy and Maxim Roy, with whom he starred on his first and her second appearance in Coyote.

== Filmography ==
- Coyote (1992) .... Ringo
- A Hero's Life (La Vie d'un héros) (1994) .... Police militaire
- Diva (unknown episodes, 1997) .... Bernard Lemay
- Life After Love (La Vie après l'amour) (2000) .... Détective Roy
- Lance et Compte: La nouvelle génération (unknown episodes, 2002) .... Assistant de Trottier
- Séraphin: Heart of Stone (Séraphin: un homme et son péché) (2002) .... Jules Pomerleau
- Il Duce canadese (2004) miniseries .... Horse buyer
- Machine Gun Molly (Monica la mitraille) (2004) .... Marcel
- Bon Voyage (2006) miniseries .... Doctor
