= Babine (film) =

- Directed by: Luc Picard
- Written by: Fred Pellerin; Joanne Arseneau
- Starring: Vincent-Guillaume Otis; Isabel Richer; Alexis Martin; Julien Poulin; Gildor Roy
- Narrated by: Fred Pellerin
- Cinematography: Jérôme Sabourin
- Edited by: Gaétan Huot
- Music by: Normand Corbeil; Serge Fiori
- Production company: Cité-Amérique
- Distributed by: Alliance Vivafilm
- Release date: November 28, 2008
- Running time: 112 minutes
- Country: Canada
- Language: French
- Budget: CAD$6.5 million

Babine is a 2008 Canadian fantasy drama film, directed by Luc Picard. Adapted from Fred Pellerin's book Il faut prendre le taureau par les contes, the film stars Vincent-Guillaume Otis as Babine, the village idiot of Saint-Élie-de-Caxton, Quebec. A lifelong outcast because his mother (Isabel Richer) was believed to be the town witch, he becomes the immediate suspect when the town's church catches fire, killing the parish priest (Julien Poulin). However, he will receive the support of the village's merchant, Toussaint Brodeur (Luc Picard), as he attempts to prove his innocence.

The film's cast also includes Alexis Martin, Gildor Roy, Marie Brassard and Antoine Bertrand.

A sequel film, Ésimésac, was released in 2012.

== Cast ==
- Vincent-Guillaume Otis: Babine, the Witch's son
- Luc Picard: Toussaint Brodeur
- Alexis Martin: New Priest
- Isabel Richer: The Witch
- Marie-Chantal Perron: Jeanette Brodeur
- Julien Poulin: Old Priest
- Maude Laurendeau: Lurette Riopel
- René Richard Cyr: Méo Bellemare
- Fred Pellerin: Narrator
- Antoine Bertrand: Ti-Toine
- Marie Brassard: Mrs. Gélinas
- Gildor Roy: Blacksmith Riopel
- Maxime Le Flaguais: Dièse

== Reception ==
Babine received generally favourable reviews by the critics. Overall, the film was quite successful, collecting $2.8 million at the Quebec box office.

=== Accolades ===
The film received many awards and nominations, including two Genie Award nominations at the 30th Genie Awards in 2009: Best Supporting Actress (Richer) and Best Sound Editing (Olivier Calvert, Natalie Fleurant, Francine Poirier and Lise Wedlock).

Award / Film Festival	Category	Recipients and nominees	Result
Directors Guild of Canada	Production Design - Feature	Nicolas Lepage	Nominated
Genie Awards	Best Supporting Actress	Isabel Richer	Nominated
Genie Awards	Best Sound Editing	Olivier Calvert; Natalie Fleurant; Francine Poirier; Lise Wedlock	Nominated
Jutra Awards	Best Art Direction	Nicolas Lepage	Won
Jutra Awards	Best Costume Design	Carmen Alie	Won
Jutra Awards	Best Makeup	Kathryn Casault	Won
Jutra Awards	Best Music	Normand Corbeil; Serge Fiori	Won
Jutra Awards	Best Sound	Dominique Chartrand; Olivier Calvert; Louis Gignac; Gavin Fernandes	Won
Jutra Awards	Best Actor	Vincent-Guillaume Otis	Nominated
Jutra Awards	Best Hairstyling	Denis Parent	Nominated
Jutra Awards	Best Screenplay	Fred Pellerin	Nominated
Jutra Awards	Best Supporting Actor	Luc Picard	Nominated
