= Okoumé (band) =

French Canadian folk-rock band

- Origin: Quebec, Canada
- Genres: Folk-rock
- Years active: 1995–2002
- Past members: Jonathan Painchaud; Éloi Painchaud; Michael Duguay; Hugo Perreault and Éric Gosselin

Okoumé was a Quebec based folk-rock band from 1995 to 2002. The group was formed in 1995 and originally consisted only of founding members Jonathan Painchaud, Éloi Painchaud, Michael Duguay, Hugo Perreault, and Éric Gosselin.

== History ==
The group formed in 1995 received the first prize in French Canadian radio station CKOI-FM's "Le concours Pro-Scène" ("Pro-Scene Contest"), which yielded them one hundred hours in a recording studio. They were also the opening act for noted French Canadian singer-songwriter Kevin Parent.

Their eponymous first album was released in 1997. Four tracks from the album ("Dis-moi pas ça", "La lune pleure", "Le bruit des origines", and "La mer à boire") placed in weekly Top Ten rankings, with "Le bruit des origines" ranking at number in CKOI-FM's Top 50 of 1998 and "La mer à boire" ranking at number 24 the following year. The band went on tour to support these releases.

Okoumé released their second album, Plan B, in 2000. The album failed to capture the interest of the public, so the group decided to disband in 2002.

The band reformed for a reunion show in 2014, as part of Montreal's Coup de coeur francophone festival.

== Members ==
- Michel Duguay - bass
- Éric Gosselin - drums, percussion
- Frédéric Lebrasseur - percussion (1995 only)
- Éloi Painchaud - backing vocals, guitar, harmonica, flute
- Jonathan Painchaud - lead vocals, acoustic guitar
- Patrice Painchaud - violin, keyboards (occasional appearances only)
- Hugo Perreault - backing vocals, guitars, dulcimer, lap steel guitar, mandolin

== Discography ==
=== Okoumé (1997) ===
1. Le bruit des origines
2. Dis-moi pas ça
3. À l'enfant que j'aurai
4. La mer à boire
5. La lune pleure
6. Europe
7. Mes idées courent
8. Mr. Bigshot
9. Reste
10. La belle et l'Anglais
11. Assassin
12. Nostradamus

=== Plan B (2000) ===
1. Irresponsable
2. Descendons tous à la rue
3. Son rire
4. Cheval de fer
5. (www.groupeokoume.com)
6. De la terre à la lune
7. Expert canin
8. Western spaghetti
9. Un homme de mon temps
10. Sans pardon
11. La pluie qui tombe
12. Les magiciens
13. Rien me tracasse
