= Eldorado (1995 film) =

- Directed by: Charles Binamé
- Written by: Charles Binamé; Robert Brouillette; Pascale Bussières; James Hyndman; Macha Limonchik; Pascale Montpetit; Lorraine Richard; Isabel Richer
- Produced by: Lorraine Richard
- Starring: Pascale Bussières; Robert Brouillette; James Hyndman; Macha Limonchik; Pascale Montpetit; Isabel Richer
- Production companies: Cité-Amérique; Alliance Vivafilm
- Release date: March 3, 1995
- Running time: 104 minutes
- Country: Canada
- Language: French
- Budget: $1.5 million

Eldorado is a French Canadian drama film, released in 1995. Directed by Charles Binamé and written by Binamé and Lorraine Richard in conjunction with its main stars, the film focuses on six young residents of Montreal trying to make sense of their directionless lives.

== Cast ==
- Pascale Bussières as Rita
- Robert Brouillette as Marc
- James Hyndman as Lloyd
- Macha Limonchik as Loulou
- Pascale Montpetit as Henriette
- Isabel Richer as Roxan
- Nicholas Hope as Rocko

== Accolades ==
The film garnered eight Genie Award nominations at the 16th Genie Awards, including Best Actress nods for Bussières, Montpetit and Richer, Best Supporting Actor for Brouillette, Best Director for Binamé, Best Art Direction or Production Design, Best Costume Design and Best Editing.

In 2023, Telefilm Canada announced that the film was one of 23 titles that will be digitally restored under its new Canadian Cinema Reignited program to preserve classic Canadian films.

== Production ==
The film had a budget of $1.5 million.

== Works cited ==
- Marshall, Bill (2001). Quebec National Cinema. McGill–Queen's University Press. ISBN 0-7735-2103-8.
