= The Dog Who Stopped the War =

- Theatrical release poster
- French: La Guerre des tuques
- Directed by: André Melançon
- Written by: Roger Cantin; Danyèle Patenaude
- Produced by: Rock Demers; Nicole Robert
- Starring: Cédric Jourde; Marie-Pierre A. D'Amour; Julien Élie; Minh Vu Duc; Maryse Cartwright
- Cinematography: François Protat
- Edited by: André Corriveau
- Music by: Germain Gauthier
- Production company: Les Productions La Fête
- Distributed by: Cinéma Plus Distribution
- Release date: October 3, 1984
- Running time: 92 minutes
- Country: Canada
- Language: Quebec French
- Budget: C$1.34 million

The Dog Who Stopped the War (French: La guerre des tuques, lit. "The Tuque War") is a 1984 Canadian comedy-drama film directed by André Melançon. It is the first film in the Tales for All (Contes pour tous) series of children's movies created by Les Productions la Fête. The film follows two rival groups of children who take part in a large scale snowball fight during winter break.

The film was released on October 3rd, 1984 by Cinéma Plus Distribution. A CGI remake, named Snowtime!, was released in 2015, itself getting a sequel named Racetime in 2018.

== Plot ==
The film involves a huge snowball fight between the children of a small town in Quebec during winter vacation who split into two rival gangs, one defending a snow castle, the other attacking it. The attackers are led by a boy who styles himself as "General Luc" and has a reputation for being bossy. The defenders are outnumbered and led by Sophie, a new girl who recently moved into town, and Pierre, who owns a St. Bernard named Cléo. They also have the genius boy François on their side. An observer, Danny Martin from Victoriaville, professes his neutrality but watches with interest.

François designs a massive, elaborate snow fortress, and Pierre's group constructs it. Luc arrives with his army, wearing makeshift armour and wielding wooden swords. They attempt to scale the walls with a ladder, but Luc is injured in the battle and orders a retreat. They regroup and stage a second, more covert attack, but they are spotted and beaten back again with snowballs soaked in ink.

Luc counters by attacking a third time, this time with his army dressed in garbage bags as protection from the ink. They overwhelm the fort's defences, and Pierre and François escape via toboggan through a secret tunnel. The two groups meet and agree to have one final battle to determine the winner.

Luc shows up for the final siege with an even larger army, having recruited additional (younger) children with chocolate. They also possess new weapons such as slingshots and a snowball cannon. Luc orders them to charge, and despite being slowed by barricades, they eventually breach the fortress walls and engage in melee combat with the defenders. Pierre's dog Cléo comes after her owner, and one of the fortress walls collapses, killing her. The war ends, as both sides help bury her.

The song at the end of the movie is performed by Nathalie Simard. It's called "L'amour a pris son temps" ("Love Is On Our Side").

== Cast ==
- Cédric Jourde as Luc Chicoine
- Marie-Pierre A. D'Amour as Sophie Tremblay
- Julien Élie as Pierre
- Minh Vu Duc as François "Les Lunettes"
- Maryse Cartwright as Lucie Tremblay
- Luc Boucher as Ti-Jacques
- Natalie Gagnon as France
- Olivier Monette as Jean-Louis Lapierre
- Mario Monette and Gilbert Monette as the Leroux twins
- Patrick St-Pierre as Daniel Blanchette
- Mathieu Savard as Ti-Guy La Lune
- Jean-François Leblanc as Chabot
- Lucy as Cléo, Pierre's pet St. Bernard

== Release ==
The Dog Who Stopped the War was first released in theatres on October 3, 1984, by Cinéma Plus. The film was also released theatrically in the United States by Miramax Films on October 25, 1985, accompanied by the Paul McCartney produced short Rupert and the Frog Song.

=== Home video ===
A 2-disc special edition French-language DVD release of the film was issued in 2009 by Imavision.

A Blu-ray disc, using a new 2K scan and restoration from the original 35mm camera negative, and containing both French and English language tracks, was released by Unidisc in Canada on November 24, 2015.

In January 2024, Canadian International Pictures released a special edition Blu-ray with both French and English language tracks, using the 2015 2K remaster.

All three versions on disc contain the 2009 documentary "La Guerre des tuques... au fil du temps".

== Reception and legacy ==
The film won the Golden Reel Award at the 6th Genie Awards in 1985, as Canada's top-grossing film of the previous year.

=== Sequels and remakes ===
The 2001 film The Hidden Fortress (La Forteresse suspendue), featuring a similar plot about rival groups of children playing war games during their summer vacation, included some characters from The Dog Who Stopped the War as parents of the new children.

An animated remake, Snowtime! (La Guerre des tuques 3D), was released in 2015. It was followed by a spinoff television series called Snowsnaps and the sequel Racetime in 2018.

In 2026, the filmmaking collective Kino Montreal released The Dog Who Stopped the War: Reimagined (La guerre des tuques : Réimaginée), a collage film which saw a large group of emerging young Quebec filmmakers each reimagine a scene from the original film in their own distinct filmmaking style. The participating directors were Charles Parisé, Frédéric Barbusci, Isabelle Giroux, Camille Théberge, Kevin Miclette, Hippolyte Guyon, Antoine Symoens, Andréanne Poisson-Robert, Rémi Fréchette, Noah Lebel-Turcotte, Suzanne Cordeau-Andrews, Justin Leblanc, Dany Foster, Gabriel Desgagnés-Saez, Juliette S. Turcot, Marc-André Morisette, Jimmy G. Pettigrew, Rita Faid and Thierry Mercure.

== See also ==
- Culture of Quebec
- Cinema of Quebec
- List of Quebec movies
- List of Canadian films
