= Fred Pellerin =

Canadian musician and storyteller (born 1976)

Fred Pellerin CM CQ
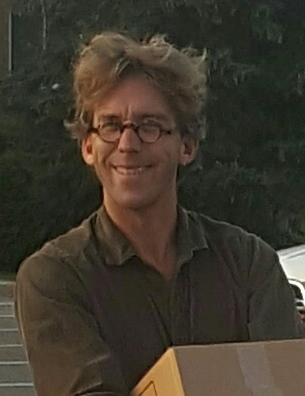
- Fred Pellerin photographed in St. Eustache, Québec, Canada outside La Petite Église.
- Born: Frédéric Pellerin; November 22, 1976 (age 49); Saint-Élie-de-Caxton, Quebec, Canada
- Education: Université du Québec à Trois-Rivières
- Occupations: musician, writer, storyteller
- Children: 3
- Writing career
- Language: French
- Years active: 2000s-present
- Notable works: Babine, Ésimésac

Fred Pellerin CM CQ (born November 22, 1976) is a Quebecois musician and storyteller from Saint-Élie-de-Caxton, Quebec. He is a three-time Juno Award nominee for Francophone Album of the Year, garnering nominations at the Juno Awards of 2011 for Silence, the Juno Awards of 2012 for C'est un monde, and the Juno Awards of 2020 for Après, and recorded "L'Hymne", the theme song for the film Snowtime! (La guerre des tuques 3D), in duet with Céline Dion.

== Career ==
A graduate of the Université du Québec à Trois-Rivières, Pellerin began performing and touring as a story teller in the 2000s. His stories typically centre on the Mauricie region of Quebec where he grew up, often introducing some elements of magic realism into their depictions of smalltown life. His career as a professional storyteller began in earnest when he competed for Team Canada in the 2001 Jeux de la Francophonie, where he was awarded the bronze medal in the "folk tale" competition. In 2007, Pellerin and his brother Nicolas released their first album as a folk music duo; the album won a Prix Félix for Best Folk Album in 2008. He has since released the solo music albums Silence, C'est un monde and Plus tard qu'on pense, as well as several books and spoken word recordings of his stories. In 2012, he appeared on Dion's TVA special to promote the release of her album Sans attendre, performing Gerry Joly's "Mille après mille" as a duet with Dion.

In 2011, a story from his book Il faut prendre le taureau par les contes was adapted by Luc Picard for the film Babine. The following year, Picard released another film of an original Pellerin screenplay, Ésimésac.

With Francis Leclerc, he cowrote the screenplay for the 2017 film Barefoot at Dawn (Pieds nus dans l'aube), based on a novel by Félix Leclerc.

The Time Thief (L'Arracheuse de temps), the third film adaptation of Pellerin's work, entered production in 2020 and was released in 2021.

== Awards ==
Pellerin has won numerous Prix Félix from ADISQ.

In 2012, the government of Jean Charest named Pellerin to the National Order of Quebec. He initially declined the honour in solidarity with the 2012 Quebec student protests against Charest's government, but accepted it after Charest was defeated in the 2012 provincial election.

He received a Canadian Screen Award nomination for Best Adapted Screenplay at the 10th Canadian Screen Awards in 2022 for The Time Thief.

== Discography ==
- Fred et Nicolas Pellerin (2007)
- Silence (2009)
- C'est un monde (2011)
- Plus tard qu'on pense (2014)
- Après (2019)

== Books ==
- Dans mon village, il y a belle Lurette… (2001) — ISBN 2-9225-2855-3
- Il faut prendre le taureau par les contes! (2003) — ISBN 978-2-9225-2836-7, 2-9225-2836-7.
- Comme une odeur de muscles (2005) — ISBN 978-2-9225-2855-8, 2-9225-2855-3.
- Bois du thé fort, tu vas pisser drette! (2005) — ISBN 978-2-9808-9470-1, 2-9808-9470-2.
- Zoom sur… Saint-Élie-de-Caxton (2006) — ISBN 978-2-9809-1701-1, 2-9809-1701-X
- L'Arracheuse de temps (2009) — ISBN 978-2-9808-9471-8
- De peigne et de misère (2013)
