= Gildor Roy =

Canadian actor (born 1960)

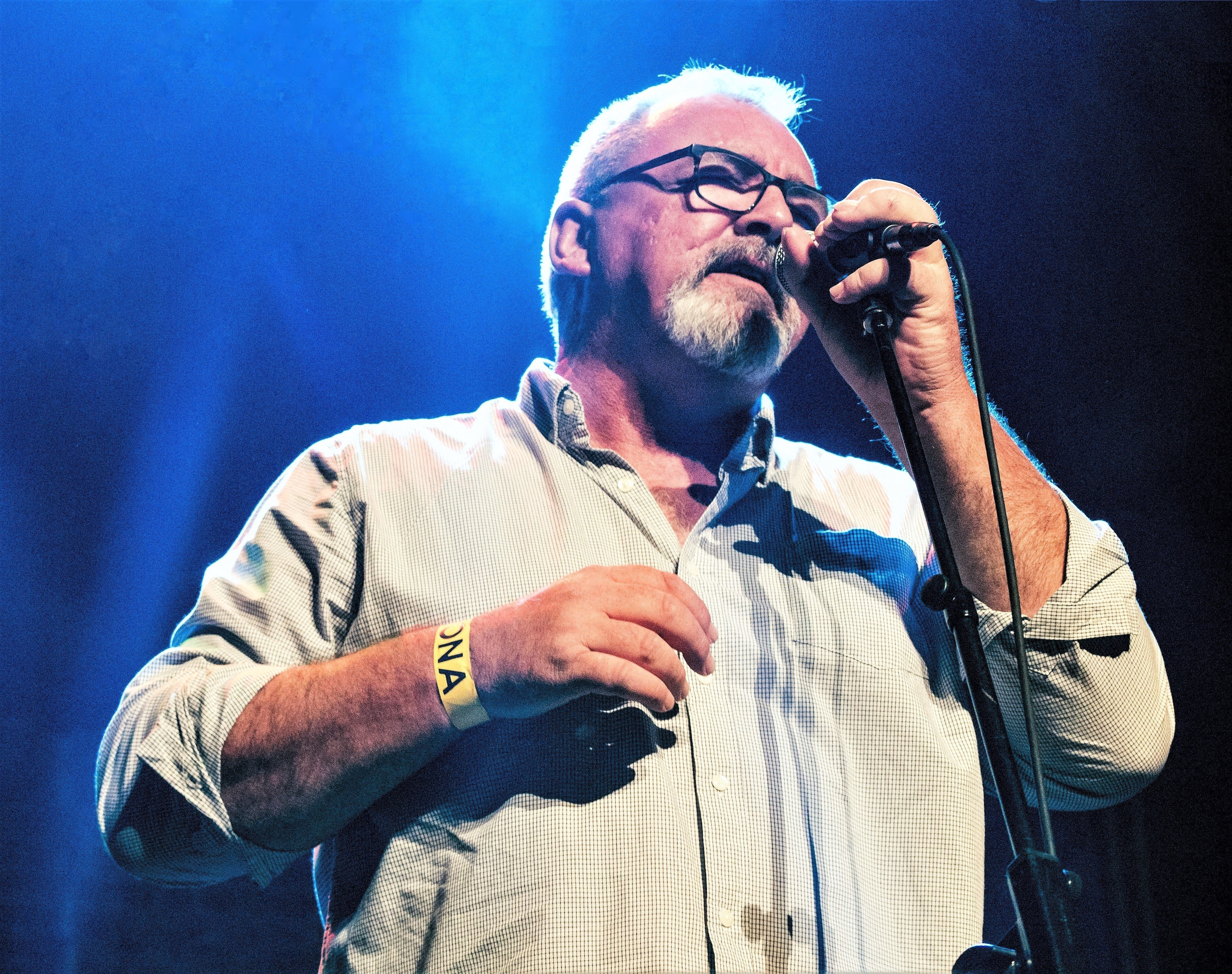
- Gildor roy.jpg
- Born: Gildor Roy Jr. May 11, 1960 (age 66); Cadillac, Quebec (now Rouyn-Noranda), Canada
- Spouse: Ingrid

Gildor Roy Jr. (born May 11, 1960) is a Canadian actor. Gildor is the brother of Québécois actors Luc Roy, Yvon Roy and Maxim Roy.

== Biography ==
He is the former owner of a baseball club in the Dominican Republic, where his wife is from. Gildor Roy played first base in baseball and is a fan of the Boston Bruins hockey team.

Professionally, he was the host of the radio show C't'encore drôle with Michel Barrette on CKMF, and a regular on the comedy game show Piment Fort, hosted by Normand Brathwaite. From 2002 to 2003, he was the host of the show L'île de Gilidor. In 2009, he was the host of a breakfast television program on TQS named Cafeine.

== Awards and nominations ==
He was nominated for a Genie in the 1992 Genie Awards for Best Performance by an Actor in a Leading Role for Requiem for a Handsome Bastard (Requiem pour un beau sans-coeur) (1992).

== Filmography ==
- Terre humaine (episode 30, 1984) ... policier
- À plein temps (unknown episodes, 1984) ....
- Épopée rock (unknown episodes, 1984) .... Gerry
- La grand remous (unknown episodes, 1989) ....
- Super sans plomb (unknown episodes, 1989) .... Robert Boissonneau
- Blanche est la nuit (1989) ....
- Ding et Dong, le film (1990) .... Chauffeur de taxi
- The Party (Le Party) (1990) .... Jacques
- Un autre homme (1990) ....
- Four Stiffs and a Trombone (L'assassin jouait du trombone) (1991) .... Le tatoué
- Des fleurs sur la neige (unknown episodes, 1991) ....
- Requiem for a Handsome Bastard (Requiem pour un beau sans-coeur) (1992) .... Louis-Régis Savoie
- La Florida (1993) .... Rheal also music and lyrics of Rent a Wreck and performer of La Quete (The Impossible Dream), Comme j'ai toujours envie d'aimer, Tu m'travailles, Rent a Wreck
- Miséricorde (1994) (TV) ....
- Louis 19, King of the Airwaves (Louis 19, le roi des ondes) (1994) .... Gai
- Sirens (1 episode, "Family Secrets", 1994).... Mr. Stevens
- 10-07: L'affaire Zeus (1995) TV mini-series .... Phil Nadeau
- 10-07: L'affaire Kafka (1996) TV mini-series .... Phil Nadeau
- Le retour (unknown episodes, 1996) .... François Jourdain
- Caboose (1996) .... Marceau
- Karmina (1996) .... Ghislain Chabot/Patrick
- km/h (unknown episodes, 1998) .... Germain Langlois
- Karmina 2 (2001) .... Ghislain Chabot
- The Mysterious Miss C. (La mystérieuse mademoiselle C.) (2002) .... Marcel Lenragé
- Les Boys IV (2005) .... Willie
- May God Bless America (Que Dieu bénisse l'Amérique) (2006) .... Maurice Ménard
- Duo (2006) .... Étienne Poulin
- Summit Circle (Contre toute espérance) (2007) .... Claude
- Babine (2008) .... Forgeron Riopel
- Ésimésac (2012) .... Forgeron Riopel
- Snowtime! (2015) - Chabot
- District 31 (2016–present), commander Daniel Chiasson
- Lâcher prise (2017–present)
- Ville Neuve (2018)
- Motel Paradis (2022) .... Jean Richard
- Blue Sky Jo (La petite et le vieux) - 2024
- Lydia and the Mist Rider (Lydia et le vaisseau des tempêtes) - 2026
