= Féminin/Féminin =

- Genre: Drama
- Created by: Chloé Robichaud
- Starring: Noémie Yelle; Eliane Gagnon; Carla Turcotte; Kimberly Laferriere; Ève Duranceau; Alexa-Jeanne Dubé; Macha Limonchik
- Country of origin: Canada
- Original language: French
- No. of seasons: 2
- No. of episodes: 16

Production
- Production location: Montreal
- Production companies: LSTW, la référence lesbienne

Féminin/Féminin is a 2014 French Canadian web series about the lives of six lesbians living in Montreal. It was created by director Chloé Robichaud and Florence Gagnon (president of the LezSpreadTheWord website). The first episode was posted on LezSpreadTheWord.com in early 2014 and the remaining 7 episodes were made available in June 2014 on the website femininfeminin.com. All episodes were written and directed by Robichaud.

In 2016, the series appeared on ICI ARTV.

== Awards and recognition ==
The series won a Gemeaux Award.
