= Jorane =

French-Canadian musician (born 1975)

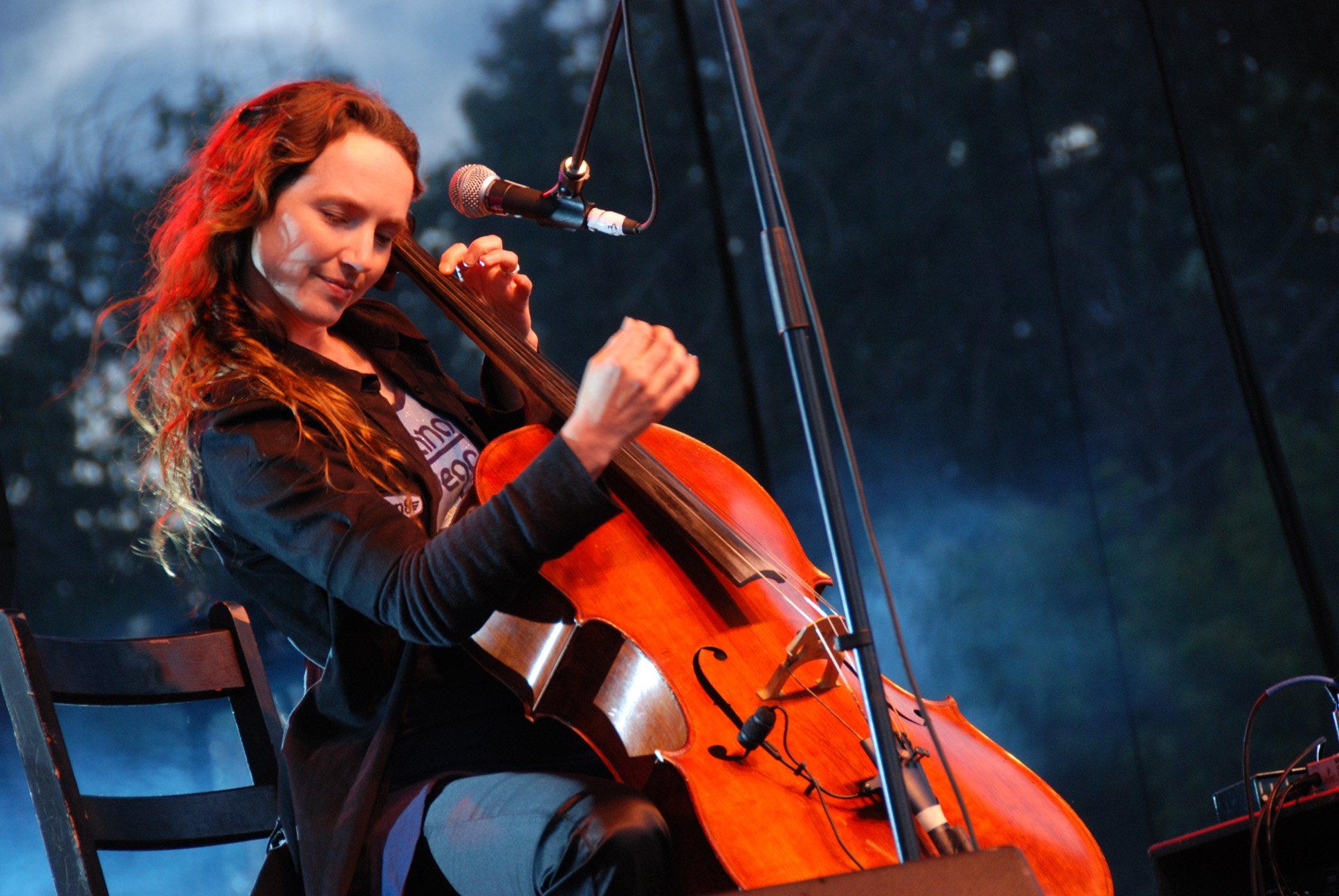
- Jorane in 2007

Background information
- Born: Jorane Pelletier; October 12, 1975 (age 51)
- Origin: Quebec, Canada
- Genres: Cello rock, experimental rock
- Occupations: Musician, songwriter
- Instruments: Cello, vocals, 6-string bass, cs80, piano, bonhomme disto, pieds, classical guitar
- Years active: 1999–present
- Labels: Taca, Avalanche, Aquarius, Six Degrees Records, L-A be
- Spouse: Éloi Painchaud
- Website: jorane.com

Jorane Pelletier (born October 12, 1975), known professionally as Jorane, is a French-Canadian singer/cellist, who performs pop and alternative music style on the cello. She has released eight full-length studio albums to date.

== Career ==
Jorane worked with Sarah McLachlan for her record Afterglow. In 2004, the press also reported that Jorane would appear on a Halloween special of the television series ZeD to perform a "witchy acid cello". That year she released her first album in English, The You and the Now; she toured across Canada as well as in the United States and Europe in support of the album.

Jorane released an album of music with French lyrics, Vers à soi, in 2007. In July that year she performed an improvised piece to accompany the images she was presented with on a large screen, in Montréal as part of "Montréal Terre", a sister concert of the Live Earth concerts.

Jorane's 2011 album Une sorcière comme les autres included consisted of cover songs, and the arrangements included ukulele and glockenspiel. The next summer she performed at the Montreal Jazz Festival.

Jorane composed the film score for films including Kamataki (2005) and Louis Cyr (2013), and for the play Le journal d'Anne Frank. In 2019 she performed as part of the festival Santa Teresa near Montreal. She received two Jutra Award nominations for Best Original Music at the 9th Jutra Awards in 2007 for her work on Kamataki and A Sunday in Kigali (Un dimanche à Kigali), winning the award for the latter film.

== Discography ==
- Vent fou (1999)
- 16mm (2000)
- Live au Spectrum (2002)
- Evapore (2003)
- The You and the Now (2004)
- Canvas or Canvass (internet project) (2007)
- Vers à soi (2007)
- Dix (2008)
- Une sorcière comme les autres (2011)
- L'Instant aimé (2012)
- Mélopée (2014)
- Hemenetset Pt.1 – EP (2019)
- Noli Timere (2026)

== Awards and nominations ==
- Album de l'année – Rock, Vent fou, Trophée Félix (Gala de l'ADISQ 2000) (Nominated)
- Interprète féminine de l'année, Trophée Félix (Gala de l'ADISQ 2000) (Nominated)
- Révélation de l'année, Trophée Félix (Gala de l'ADISQ 2000) (Nominated)
- Best New Solo Artist, JUNO Awards 2000 (Nominated)
- Francophone Album of the Year, Vers à soi, JUNO Awards 2008 (Nominated)
