= 1999 Governor General's Awards =

Canadian literary award

The winners of the 1999 Governor General's Literary Awards were announced by Jean-Louis Roux, chairman, and Shirley Thomson, director of the Canada Council for the Arts, at a press conference held on November 16 at the National Library of Canada. Each winner received a cheque for CA$10,000.

== English ==
Category	Winner	Nominated
Fiction	Matt Cohen, Elizabeth and After	Neil Bissoondath, The Worlds Within Her; Anne Fleming, Pool-hopping and Other Stories; Elyse Gasco, Can You Wave Bye Bye, Baby?; Keith Maillard, Gloria
Non-fiction	Marq de Villiers, Water	Donald Harman Akenson, Surpassing Wonder; Michael Bliss, William Osler; Wayson Choy, Paper Shadows: A Chinatown Childhood; Wayne Johnston, Baltimore's Mansion
Poetry	Jan Zwicky, Songs for Relinquishing the Earth	Lynn Davies, The Bridge that Carries the Road; Susan Goyette, The True Names of Birds; Richard Harrison, Big Breath of a Wish; Terence Young, The Island in Winter
Drama	Michael Healey, The Drawer Boy	Wendy Lill, Corker; Daniel MacIvor, Marion Bridge; Colleen Murphy, Beating Heart Cadaver; Theresa Tova, Still the Night
Children's literature	Rachna Gilmore, A Screaming Kind of Day	Don Gillmor, The Christmas Orange; Graham McNamee, Hate You; W.D. Valgardson, The Divorced Kids Club and Other Stories; Frieda Wishinsky, Each One Special
Children's illustration	Gary Clement, The Great Poochini	Rose Cowles, I Know an Old Laddie; Zhong-Yang Huang, Dragon New Year; Ludmila Zeman, Sindbad: from the Tales of the Thousand and One Nights; Werner Zimmermann, Brave Highland Heart
French to English translation	Patricia Claxton, Gabrielle Roy: A Life (François Ricard, Gabrielle roy, une vie)	David Homel, Olivo Oliva (Philippe Poloni, Olivo, Oliva); Nancy Huston, The Mark of the Angel (her own novel L'Empreinte de l'ange); Lazer Lederhendler, The Sparrow Has Cut the Day in Half (Claire Dé, Bonheur, Oiseau rare); Donald Winkler, The World of the Gift (Jacques Godbout and Alain Caillé, L'Esprit du don)

== French ==
Category	Winner	Nominated
Fiction	Lise Tremblay, La Danse juive	Hugues Corriveau, Le Ramasseur de souffle; Jacques Marchand, Les Vents dominants; Carole Massé, L'Ennemi; Gaétan Soucy, La Petite Fille qui aimait trop les allumettes
Non-fiction	Pierre Perrault, Le Mal du Nord	Anne Élaine Cliche, Dire le livre; Jean-Claude Dubé, Le Chevalier de Montmagny: Premier gouverneur de la Nouvelle-France; François-Marc Gagnon, Chronique du mouvement automatiste québécois 1941-1954; Daniel Jacques, Nationalité et Modernité
Poetry	Herménégilde Chiasson, Conversations	Claude Beausoleil, Le Chant du voyageur; Nicole Brossard, Musée de l'os et de l'eau; Carole David, La Maison d'Ophélie; Pierre Ouellet, Dieu sait quoi
Drama	Jean-Marc Dalpé, Il n'y a que l'amour	Carole Fréchette, Les Sept Jours de Simon Labrosse; René Gingras, D'Avila; Michel Tremblay, Encore une fois, si vous permettez
Children's literature	Charlotte Gingras, La Liberté? Connais pas...	Agathe Génois, Adieu, vieux lézard!; Andrée-Anne Gratton, Le Message du biscuit chinois; Sylvie Nicolas, Célestine Motamo; Raymond Plante, Marilou Polaire et l'iguane des neiges
Children's illustration	Stéphane Jorisch, Charlotte et l'île du destin	Nicole Lafond, Contes pour enfants; Michèle Lemieux, Nuit d'orage; Luc Melanson, La Petite Kim; Pierre Pratt, La Vie exemplaire de Martha et Paul
English to French translation	Jacques Brault, Transfiguration (E. D. Blodgett, Transfiguration)	Charlotte Melançon, Réflexions d'un frère siamois (John Ralston Saul, Reflections of a Siamese Twin: Canada at the End of the Twentieth Century); Marie José Thériault, Ours (Marian Engel, Bear)
