= 1991 Governor General's Awards =

Canadian literary award

Each winner of the 1991 Governor General's Awards for Literary Merit received $10,000 and a medal from the Governor General of Canada. The winners were selected by a panel of judges administered by the Canada Council for the Arts.

== English ==
Category	Winner	Nominated
Fiction	Rohinton Mistry, Such a Long Journey	Margaret Atwood, Wilderness Tips; Don Dickinson, Blue Husbands; Douglas Glover, A Guide to Animal Behaviour; Terry Griggs, Quickening
Non-fiction	Robert Hunter and Robert Calihoo, Occupied Canada: A Young White Man Discovers His Unsuspected Past	Northrop Frye, Words With Power; Kristjana Gunnars, Zero Hour; D. L. MacDonald, Poor Polidori: A Critical Biography of the Author of "The Vampyre"; Rosemary Sullivan, By Heart: Elizabeth Smart, A Life
Poetry	Don McKay, Night Field	Don Domanski, Wolf-Ladder; Judith Fitzgerald, Rapturous Chronicles; Patrick Lane, Mortal Remains; Anne Michaels, Miner's Pond
Drama	Joan MacLeod, Amigo's Blue Guitar	Sally Clark, The Trial of Judith K.; Don Druick, Where is Kabuki?; Linda Griffiths, The Darling Family; Daniel David Moses, Coyote City
Children's literature	Sarah Ellis, Pick-Up Sticks	Martha Brooks, Two Moons in August; Roch Carrier, A Happy New Year's Day; Jean Little, Stars Come Out Within; Monty Reid, The Last Great Dinosaurs
Children's illustration	Joanne Fitzgerald, Doctor Kiss Says Yes	Kady MacDonald Denton, The Travelling Musicians; Michèle Lemieux, Peter and the Wolf; Gilles Pelletier, A Happy New Year's Day; Jacqueline White, Coyote Winter
French to English translation	Albert W. Halsall, A Dictionary of Literary Devices: Gradus, A-Z (Bernard Dupriez, Gradus : Les procédés littéraires)	Linda Gaboriau, Lilies, or the Revival of a Romantic Drama (Michel Marc Bouchard, Les feluettes); Peter Keating, Physics and the Rise of Scientific Research in Canada (Yves Gingras, Les origines de la recherche scientifique au Canada : le cas des physiciens); Patricia Smart and Dorothy Howard, The Diary of André Laurendeau (André Laurendeau, Journal tenu pendant la Commission royale d’enquête sur le bilinguisme et le biculturalisme)

== French ==
Category	Winner	Nominated
Fiction	André Brochu, La croix du Nord	Flora Balzano, Soigne ta chute; Georges-Hébert Germain, Christophe Colomb: Naufrage sur les côtes du paradis; Hans-Jürgen Greif, L'Autre Pandore; Hélène Rioux, Les Miroirs d'Éléonore
Non-fiction	Bernard Arcand, Le Jaguar et le Tamanoir	Betty Bednarski, Autour de Ferron : littérature, traduction, altérité; Guy Bourgeault, L'Éthique et le droit : face aux nouvelles technologies biomédicales; Jacques Jaffelin, Le Promeneur d'Einstein; Robert Major, Jean Rivard ou l'art de réussir: idéologies et utopie dans l'oeuvre d'Antoine Gérin-Lajoie
Poetry	Madeleine Gagnon, Chant pour un Québec lointain	Claude Beausoleil, Une certaine fin de siècle; François Charron, L'Intraduisible amour; Herménégilde Chiasson, Vous; Rachel Leclerc Les vies frontalières
Drama	Gilbert Dupuis, Mon oncle Marcel qui vague vague près du métro Berri	Victor-Lévy Beaulieu, La maison cassée; Michel Marc Bouchard, L'Histoire de l'oie; Dominic Champagne, La répétition; Suzanne Lebeau, Conte du jour et de la nuit
Children's literature	François Gravel, Deux heures et demie avant Jasmine	Ginette Anfousse, Un terrible secret; Johanne Mercier, L'Été des autres; Daniel Sernine, Quatre destins
Children's illustration	Sheldon Cohen, Un champion	Stéphane Poulin, Un voyage pour deux : contes et mensonges de mon enfance
English to French translation	Jean-Paul Sainte-Marie and Brigitte Chabert Hacikyan, Les Enfants d'Aataentsic: l'histoire du peuple huron (Bruce Trigger, The Children of Aataentsic: A History of the Huron People to 1660)	Jean Antonin Billard and Christine Le Boeuf, Orages électriques (David Homel, Electrical Storms); Brigitte Chabert Hacikyan, Le Canada au temps des aventuriers (Robert McGhee, Canada Rediscovered); Michèle Marineau, Sur le rivage (Lucy Maud Montgomery, Along the Shore); Colette Tonge, Un heureux canular (Robertson Davies, Leaven of Malice)
