= Governor General's Award for French-language young people's literature - text =

Canadian literary award

The Governor General's Award for French-language young people's literature - text is a Canadian literary award that annually recognizes one Canadian writer for a book written in French in the "Young People's Literature - Text" category of the Governor General's Awards for Literary Merit. It is one of four awards recognizing English- and French-language writing and illustration in young people's literature. The awards are administered by the Canada Council.

In name, this award is part of the Governor General's Award program only from 1987, but the four children's literature awards were established in 1975 under a Canada Council name. In the event, the "Canada Council" and "Governor General's" awards have recognized writing in a French-language children's book every year from 1975. The category was known as "Children's Literature - Text" until 2015. In 2016, it became part of the Young People's Literature categories, under the name "Young People's Literature - Text".

== Canada Council Children's Literature Prize ==
In 1975 the Canada Council established four annual prizes of $5000 for the year's best English- and French-language children's books by Canadian writers and illustrators. Those "Canada Council Children's Literature Prizes" were continued under the "Governor General's Awards" rubric from 1987, and continue today. Among them the French-language writing prize was awarded every year from 1975.

- 1975: Louise Aylwin, Raminagradu: Histoires ordinaires pour enfants extraordinaire
- 1976: Bernadette Renaud, Emilie, la baignoire à pattes
- 1977: Denise Houle, Lune de neige
- 1978: Ginette Anfousse, La chicane
- 1979: Gabrielle Roy, Courte-Queue, ill. François Olivier;

English translation, Cliptail (McClelland & Stewart, 1980, OCLC 13443940)

- 1980: Bertrand Gauthier, Hébert Luée
- 1981: Suzanne Martel, Nos amis robots;

English translation, Robot Alert (Kids Can Press, 1982, OCLC 671722736)

- 1982: Ginette Anfousse, Fabien 1: Un loup pour Rose and Fabien 2: Une nuit au pays des malices
- 1983: Denis Côté, Hockeyeurs Cybernétiques
- 1984: Daniel Sernine, Le cercle violet
- 1985: Robert Soulières, Casse-tête chinois
- 1986: Raymond Plante, Le derneir des raisins

== 1980s ==
Year	Author	Title
1987	David Schinkel and Yves Beauchesne	Le Don
1987	Ginette Anfousse	Les catastrophes de Rosalie
1987	Denis Côté	Nocturnes pour Jessie
1987	Vincent Lauzon	Le pays à l'envers
1988	Michèle Marineau	Cassiopée ou l'Été polonais
1988	Denis Côté	Les prisonniers du zoo
1988	Cécile Gagnon	Châteaux de sable
1988	André Vanasse	Des Millions pour une chanson
1989	Charles Montpetit	Temps mort
1989	Jacques Lazure	Le Domaine des Sans Yeux
1989	Joceline Sanschagrin	La Fille aux cheveux rouges

== 1990s ==
Year	Author	Title
1990	Christiane Duchesne	La Vraie histoire du chien de Clara Vic
1990	José Fréchette	L'Automne à 15 ans
1990	Philippe Gauthier	L'Héritage de Qader
1990	Johanne Massé	Le Passé en péril
1991	François Gravel	Deux heures et demie avant Jasmine
1991	Ginette Anfousse	Un terrible secret
1991	Johanne Mercier	L'Été des autres
1991	Daniel Sernine	Quatre destins
1992	Christiane Duchesne	Victor
1992	Linda Brousseau	Coups durs pour une sorcière
1992	Dominique Demers	Un hiver de tourmente
1992	Esther Rochon	L'ombre et le cheval
1992	Daniel Sernine	Les rêves d'Argus
1993	Michèle Marineau	La Route de Chlifa
1993	Yves Beauchemin	Antoine et Alfred
1993	Dominique Demers	Les grands sapins ne meurent pas
1993	Raymond Plante	Les Dents de la poule
1994	Suzanne Martel	Une belle journée pour mourir
1994	Marie-Danielle Croteau	Un monde à la dérive
1994	François Gravel	Klonk
1995	Sonia Sarfati	Comme une peau de chagrin
1995	Jean-Pierre Davidts	Contes du chat gris
1995	Christiane Duchesne	Berthold et Lucrèce
1995	Annouchka Gravel Galouchko	Sho et les dragons d'eau
1995	Jacques Savoie	Toute la beauté du monde
1996	Gilles Tibo	Noémie: Le Secret de Madame Lumbago
1996	Sylvie Desrosiers	Le Long silence
1996	Jacinthe Gaulin	Mon p'tit frère
1996	Daniel Sernine	L'Arc-en-cercle
1996	Hélène Vachon	Le Plus proche voisin
1997	Michel Noël	Pien
1997	Dominique Demers	Maïna, tomes 1 et 2
1997	Agathe Génois	Sarah, je suis là!
1997	Jacques Godbout	Une leçon de chasse
1997	Maryse Pelletier	Une vie en éclats
1998	Angèle Delaunois	Variations sur un même «t'aime»
1998	Guy Dessureault	Lettre de Chine
1998	Daniel Mativat	Terreur sur la Windigo
1998	Danielle Rochette	La Fugue d'Antoine
1998	Hélène Vachon	Le Cinéma de Somerset
1999	Charlotte Gingras	La Liberté? Connais pas...
1999	Agathe Génois	Adieu, vieux lézard!
1999	Andrée-Anne Gratton	Le Message du biscuit chinois
1999	Sylvie Nicolas	Célestine Motamo
1999	Raymond Plante	Marilou Polaire et l'iguane des neiges

== 2000s ==
Year	Author	Title
2000	Charlotte Gingras	Un été de Jade
2000	Guy Dessureault	L'homme au chat
2000	François Gravel	L'été de la moustache
2000	Gilles Tibo	La Planète du petit géant
2000	Hélène Vachon	Le délire de Somerset
2001	Christiane Duchesne	Jomusch et le troll des cuisines
2001	Cécile Gagnon	Le chien de Pavel
2001	Ann Lamontagne	Les mémoires interdites
2001	Marthe Pelletier	Chante pour moi, Charlotte
2001	Jean-Michel Schembré	Le noir passage
2002	Hélène Vachon	L'oiseau de passage
2002	Dominique Demers	Ta voix dans la nuit
2002	François Gravel	David et la maison de la sorcière
2002	Sylvain Meunier	Le seul ami
2002	Pierre Roy	Une tonne de patates!
2003	Danielle Simard	J’ai vendu ma sœur
2003	Mélissa Anctil	Gigi
2003	Roger Des Roches	Marie Quatdoigts
2003	Laurent Grimon	Le chevalier des Arbres
2003	Paul Chanel Malenfant	Si tu allais quelque part
2004	Nicole Leroux	L'Hiver de Léo Polatouche
2004	Édith Bourget	Autour de Gabrielle
2004	Charlotte Gingras	La boîte à bonheur
2004	Marie-Francine Hébert	Le ciel tombe à côté
2004	Nancy Montour	Le coeur au vent
2005	Camille Bouchard	Le Ricanement des hyènes
2005	Alain M. Bergeron	Les Tempêtes ou Les mémoires d’un Beatle raté
2005	Jean-Pierre Davidts	Le Baiser de la sangsue
2005	Danielle Marcotte	Les sabots rouges
2005	Sylvain Meunier	L’homme à la bicyclette
2006	Dany Laferrière	Je suis fou de Vava
2006	Édith Bourget	Les saisons d’Henri
2006	Fernande D. Lamy	Cauchemar aveugle
2006	Françoise Lepage	Poupeska
2006	Daniel Mativat	Nuits rouges
2007	François Barcelo	La fatigante et le fainéant
2007	Sophie Gironnay	Philou, architecte et associés
2007	André Leblanc	L’envers de la chanson: Des enfants au travail 1850-1950
2007	Sylvain Meunier	Piercings sanglants
2007	Hélène Vachon	Les saisons vues par Schouster
2008	Sylvie Desrosiers	Les trois lieues
2008	Camille Bouchard	Trente-neuf
2008	Charlotte Gingras	Ophélie
2008	François Gravel	Sales crapauds
2008	Carole Tremblay	Fred Poulet enquête sur une chaussette
2009	Hervé Bouchard	Harvey
2009	Jocelyn Boisvert	Mort et déterré
2009	Pierre Chartray, Sylvie Rancourt	Simon et le chasseur de dragons
2009	Michèle Laframboise	La quête de Chaaas, tome 2 – Les vents de Tammerlan
2009	Matthieu Simard	Pavel, épisode 1 – Plus vivant que toutes les pornstars réunies

== 2010s ==
Year	Author	Title
2010	Élise Turcotte	Rose : derrière le rideau de la folie
2010	Michel Noël	Nishka
2010	Patrice Robitaille	Le Chenil
2010	Yves Steinmetz	La Chamane de bois-rouge
2010	Alain Ulysse Tremblay	Le dernier été
2011	Martin Fournier	Les aventures de Radisson - 1. L’enfer ne brûle pas
2011	Anne Bernard-Lenoir	Enigmae.com - 3. L’orteil de Paros
2011	Camille Bouchard	Un massacre magnifique
2011	Mario Brassard	La saison des pluies
2011	Pierre Marmiesse	Sous le signe d’Exu - 1. Initiation
2012	Aline Apostolska	Un été d’amour et de cendres
2012	Biz	La chute de Sparte (withdrawn from competition)
2012	Louise Bombardier	Quand j'étais chien
2012	Camille Bouchard	Le coup de la giraffe
2012	François Gravel	Hò
2013	Geneviève Mativat	À l'ombre de la grande maison
2013	Camille Bouchard	D'or et de poussière
2013	Fanny Britt	Jane, le renard et moi
2013	Emmanuelle Caron	Gladys et Vova
2013	Lili Chartrand	Le monde fabuleux de Monsieur Fred
2014	Linda Amyot	Le jardin d’Amsterdam
2014	India Desjardins	Le Noël de Marguerite
2014	Patrick Isabelle	Eux
2014	Jean-François Sénéchal	Feu
2014	Mélanie Tellier	Fiona
2015	Louis-Philippe Hébert	Marie Réparatrice
2015	Camille Bouchard	Les Forces du désordre
2015	Denis Côté	Dessine-moi un martien
2015	Roger Des Roches	Boîtamémoire
2015	Sandra Dussault	Direction Saint-Creux-des-Meuh-Meuh
2016	François Gilbert	Hare Krishna
2016	Camille Bouchard	Nouvelle-Orléans
2016	Mario Brassard	Quand hurle la nuit
2016	Amélie Dumoulin	Fé M Fé
2016	Patrick Isabelle	Camille
2017	Véronique Drouin	L'importance de Mathilde Poisson
2017	Annie Bacon	Chroniques post-apocalyptiques d'une enfant sage
2017	Jocelyn Boisvert	Les Moustiques
2017	Roxane Desjardins	Moi qui marche à tâtons dans ma jeunesse noire
2017	K. Lambert	L'élixir du baron Von Rezine
2018	Mario Brassard	Ferdinand F., 81 ans, chenille
2018	Jonathan Bécotte	Maman veut partir
2018	Jocelyn Boisvert	Un dernier songe avant le grand sommeil
2018	Camille Bouchard	13000 ans et des poussières
2018	Brigitte Vaillancourt	Les marées
2019	Dominique Demers	L'albatros et la mésange
2019	Lucie Bergeron	Dans le cœur de Florence
2019	Édith Bourget	Où est ma maison?
2019	Pierre Labrie	Mon cœur après la pluie
2019	Jean-François Sénéchal	Au carrefour

== 2020s ==
Year	Author	Title	Ref
2020	François Blais	Lac Adélard	
2020	Camille Bouchard	Cicatrices	
2020	Magali Laurent	L'Ogre et l'enfant	
2020	Johanne Mercier	Il faut du tout pour faire un monstre	
2020	Maryse Pagé	Rap pour violoncelle seul	
2021	Jean-François Sénéchal	Les Avenues	
2021	Jonathan Bécotte	Comme un ouragan	
2021	Mario Fecteau	Le Dernier Viking	
2021	Sandra Sirois	Stella, qu'est-ce que tu fais là?	
2021	Frédérick Wolfe	Tara voulait jouer	
2022	Julie Champagne	Cancer ascendant Autruche	
2022	Daphné B.	La Pluie des autres	
2022	Reynald Cantin	Les Bulles	
2022	Carolanne Foucher	Dessiner dans les marges et autres activités de fantôme	
2022	Marie-Hélène Jarry	Les carnets de novembre	
2023	Lou Beauchesne	Linoubliable	
2023	J.L. Blanchard	Zipolaris Tome 3 : La malédiction de Zangra	
2023	Sylvie Drapeau	Escarpolette	
2023	Mylène Goupil	Mélie quelque part au milieu	
2023	Jean-Christophe Réhel	Le plancher de la lune	
2024	Stéfani Meunier	Une bulle en dehors du temps	
2024	Moira-Uashteskun Bacon	Envole-toi, Mikun	
2024	Dominique Chicoine	Les quatre vérités	
2024	Marc-André Dufour-Labbé	Carreauté Kid	
2024	Jean-Guy Forget, Mélodie Bujold-Henri	Déménager au ciel	
2025	Laurie Léveillé	Coup bas	
2025	Laura Doyle Péan	Cheer	
2025	Marc-André Dufour-Labbé	Fatigué mort	
2025	Catherine Fouron	Vieille branche	
2025	Noémie Pomerleau-Cloutier	Tête boule disco	
2026	Maude Ménard-Dunn	Comment convaincre un fantôme de déménager	
2026	Maude Nepveu-Villeneuve	Les différences invisibles	
2026	Eveline Payette	Un don du ciel	
2026	Jean-Christophe Réhel	Au chevet de la lumière	
2026	Uashteskun	Un roi sans couronne	

== See also ==
- Governor General's Award for French-language young people's literature - illustrated books
- Governor General's Award for English-language young people's literature - text
- Governor General's Award for English-language young people's literature - illustrated books
