= Leanne Franson =

Canadian illustrator and cartoonist

- Born: 1963 (age 62–63); Regina, Saskatchewan
- Education: Concordia University
- Known for: Liliane, Bi-Dyke
- Awards: Governor General's Award
- Website: www.leannefranson.com

Leanne Franson (born 1963 in Regina, Saskatchewan) is a Canadian illustrator and cartoonist. She illustrates picture books, children's novels, educational texts, pamphlets, and magazines. She currently lives in Martensville, Saskatchewan, near Saskatoon. She is bilingual in English and French. She has an adopted son from China who is homeschooled. She also has two cats, Sadie and Alley.

She is known for her semi-autobiographical comics featuring the female bisexual character Liliane, Bi-Dyke. These have been included in various anthologies and collected in books. Her comics bring a bisexual woman's perspective to the queer comic scene, including some controversy. For example, in Oh... (1992) her "full frontal" image of a woman putting on a bra without any underwear on, required a full-page warning prior to its appearance.

== Early life and education ==
Franson states that she, "collected only Betty and Veronica comic books" growing up in addition to spending much time at the library where she found refuge in the comics of the Leader Post. After studying Fine Arts at Concordia University in Montreal, beginning in 1982, where she graduated in 1985. Leanne Franson also worked at Le Pavillon des Arts in retail sales from 1986 to 1991. During her time in school, around 1986, she began drawing comics. She studied ceramics from 1988, graduating in 1989, at the Banff Centre, School of Fine Arts.

Franson began working in illustration in 1991 for both trade and educational books. Franson published her first comic in 1992 since then has self-published more than twenty issues of her minicomic series Liliane. Franson would later move from Montreal to London in 1994 in order to learn about the comic scene abroad.

== Comic publications ==
Franson is mostly known because of her reoccurring comic character and alter ego: Liliane the bisexual dyke. She has published three books, Teaching Through Trauma (1999), Assume Nothing: Evolution of a Bi-Dyke (2000), and Don't Be A Crotte (2004), which each contain a series of comics featuring Liliane. Just like Franson, Lilian's day time job is illustrating comic books.

Leanne Franson was influenced by the simple style of Ben Wicks, as well as Lynn Johnston's characters. Franson first created Liliane in 1992; her work has been described as closer to an "extended essay" than an average comic. Franson explores all things queer in her comic series, facing topics like IVF, interracial relationships, and bisexual butch representation in the LGBTQIA community. While she tackles heavy topics, Liliane the Bi-Dyke radiates light, with her simple drawing style. Franson also contributed comics to the British group Fanny created in 1991, which published cartoon anthologies via Knockabout Comics. Early in the 1990s, Franson contributed comic strips to a monthly publication LesboInfo. She took a break from publishing comics between the years 1999 and 2004.

=== Liliane, Bi-Dyke ===
- Oh...: Her, Comic Quarterly, 1992.
- Gregory, Roberta. "Fuckin' Faggot", Naughty Bits #6,1992.
- "Hair... a True Happening...," Zine: Mousie #2, 1992.
- Dyke's Delight!, Issue 1, 1993.
- Real Girl #6, Holiday 1993.
- What Is This Thing Called Sex?, 1993.
- "Vladmira, The Lesbian Vampire", Gay Comix #18, Spring 1993.
- "Differently Pleasured," Brat Attack, the Zine for Leatherdykes and Other Bad Girls, issue 4. 1993.
- "Race, she said... and Interracial Relationships," Zine: Mousie #3, 1993.
- "Toaster: A Story of Unplanned Parenthood," Gay Comix #22, Summer 1994.
- Strange-Looking Exile #5, 1994.
- Action Girl Comics, Issue 1, 1994
- Dyke's Delight! Issue 2, 1994.
- Action Girl Comics, Issue 2, 1995.
- Gay Comix #24, Fall 1996.
- Assume Nothing: Starring Liliane: Evolution of a Bi-Dyke, 1997.
- "Impeccable Taste" "Loose Skin in old Montréal or in other words: epidermis anonymous erraticus" "Proximal Possibilities" "Of Dating and Dogs" "Mixed Blessings" "Flicks and Finales" "Breeders" "Do It Myself (a slice of the life of a massothérapeute!!)" "Breeders Too... reprise of a theme..." Assume Nothing, Slab-O-Concrete, 1999.
- "l'il Liliane in Untimely Hamster Deaths" "Liliane in Old Wives Tales" "Real Lesbians Don't Procreate (The Continuing Breeder Saga)" "Anal Appointment Accuracy" "Differently Pleasured'" "The World of Phantom Relationships "Liliane in Real Bisexuals Do (Sometimes!) Shoot Sperm (The Breeder Saga Swims On!)" "Playing with Perruques," Teaching Through Trauma, Slab-O-Concrete, 1999.
- Howard, David. "Old Wives Tales," Don't Touch Me, volume 1, issue 6, 1997.
- Men Are From Detroit, Women Are From Paris, 1999.
- Dansereau, Paul. "Liliane in I Posed for a Pornographer!!" "A Rental Disaster (A Compendium of Do's and Don't's in One Twisted Tale of Crazy Colocation!!)" "Yes We Don't Want No Bisexuals! Part 1" "The Ex and the VCR" "How to Screw Someone Around (A Series of Tips)" "Yes, We Don't Want No Bisexuals Part 2" "Attack of the Inflated Ego!!" Don't Be a Crotte!, 2004.
- Kirby, Robert. Boy Trouble: 10th Anniversary Issue, 2004.

=== Articles & anthologies ===
- Warren, Roz. Dyke Strippers: Lesbian Cartoonists A to Z, 1995.
- Bell, Brandi Leigh-Ann. Riding the Third Wave: Women-Produced Zines and Feminisms, 2002.
- Camper, Jennifer. Juicy Mother: Celebration, 2004.
- Elfodiluce, Valeriano. Happy Boys & Girls: Storie Sentimentali di Gay e Lesbiche, 2006.
- Camper, Jennifer. Juicy Mother 2: How They Met, 2007.
- "... and Then She Wrote," Women's Review of Books Volume 24, No. 4, 2007.
- Marni, Stanley. Drawn Out, 2010.
- Hall, Justine. "Bof and Buzz in Rip Up those Roles!! (1993)" & "Liliane in the Sensitive Straight Boy (1996)" from No Straight Lines: Four Decades of Queer Comics, 2012.
- Christensen, Charles "Zan." Anything That Loves, 2013.

== Current work ==
Franson illustrates children's books for several Canadian publishers, in both English and French. She has published with French-language publishers Soulières Éditeur and Les éditions de la courte échelle and with English publishers such as Scholastic Canada, Bayard Canada, Orca Press, and Annick Press. Leanne Franson's main focus is now on her illustrations. According to Scholastic, she has illustrated close to 80 different books. In addition, Franson's work has been featured in magazines, textbooks, and even a commercial.

Leanne Franson first works with pencil, then technical pen and dip pen. She then layers her images with acrylic ink and/or India ink, but also does digital drawing using a Wacom Cintiq touch monitor.

In early 2016 Franson began making ceramic goods again and works in her home studio. She, as well as her son, work with both stoneware and porcelain. Franson prefers hand-building her tiny pieces but also throws on the wheel.

=== Illustrative publications ===
==== In French ====
- Brousseau, Linda. Marélie de la mer: roman, 1993.
- Anne Legault, Une fille pas comme les autres, 1997.
- Jasmine Dubé, L'ourson qui voulait une Juliette, 1997.
- Legault, Anne. Une première pour Étamine Léger,1998.
- Manjusha Pawagi, La petite fille qui détestait les livres, 1998.
- Girard, Éric. Drôle de singe!, 1999.
- Therrien, Maurice. Éloïse et le cadeau des arbres, 1999.
- Legault, Anne. Un message d'Etamine Léger, 1999.
- Therrien, Maurice. Éloïse et le vent, 2000.
- Gratton, Andrée-Anne. Le mystère des nuits blanches: roman. 2000.
- Chrystine Brouillet, Une chauve-souris qui pleurait d'être trop belle, 2000.
- Boisvert, Nicole M. Crapule, le chat, 2000.
- Gagnon, Cécile. Le chien de Pavel: un roman, 2000.
- Bergeron, Lucie. Bout de comète!, 2000.
- Desrosiers, Sylvie. Au revior, Camille!, 2000.
- Andrée-Anne Gratton, Simon et Violette, 2001.
- Brochu, Yvon. Sauvez Henri!, 2001.
- Desrosiers, Sylvie. Le concert de Thomas, 2001.
- Andrée-Anne Gratton. Simon et Violette, 2001.
- Sylvie Desrosiers, Ma mère est une extraterrestre, 2002.
- Raymond Plante, La curieuse invasion de Picots-les-Bains par les zèbres, 2002.
- Louise-Michelle Sauriol, Siara et L'oiseau d'amour, (French and Inuktitut), 2002.
- Desrosiers, Sylvie. Ma mère est une extraterrestre, 2002.
- Rose, Indiana. Benten et le dragon, 2003.
- Gagnon, Cécile. Justine et le chien de Pavel: un roman, 2003.
- Desrosiers, Sylvie. Je suis Thomas, 2003.
- Gratton, Andrée-Anne. Le secret de Simon: roman, 2003.
- Plante, Raymond. Un canard entre les canines, 2004.
- Gratton, Andrée-Anne, Un espion dans la maison: roman, 2004.
- Sauriol, Louise-Michelle. Les trouvailles d'Adami, 2004.
- Gratton, Andrée-Anne. Simon, l'as du ballon: roman, 2004.
- Plante, Raymond. La vedette de la ronflette, 2005.
- Blanchette, Chantal. Les chaussettes de Julien: roman, 2005.
- Robert Soulières, Le chien de Léopold, 2006.
- Plante, Raymond. Le chaud manteau de Léo, 2006.
- Bertrand, Nathalie. Les pieds dans les plats, 2006.
- Gagnon, Cécile. Justine et Sofia, 2006.
- Sauriol, Louise-Michelle. Les aventures du géant Beaupré, 2006.
- Desrosiers, Sylvie. Audition de Thomas (L'), 2006.
- Nathalie Bertrand, Les Pieds dans les plats, 2007.
- Gratton, Andrée-Anne. Mission chocolat pour Simon: roman, 2007.
- Poirier, Nadine. Au voleur!, 2008.
- Gratton, Andrée-Anne. Simon et Zizou: roman, 2008.
- Cécile Gagnon, Justine au Pays de Sofia, 2008.
- Jarry, Marie-Hélène. À la recherche du tikami, 2009.
- Somain, Jean-François. Le béret vert: un roman, 2009.
- Gratton, Andrée-Anne. Simon est amoureux: roman, 2009.
- Mativat, Geneviève. La sonate des chatouilles, 2009.
- Brousseau, Linda. Marélie de la mer: roman, 2010.
- Bergeron, Alain M. Le petit maître, 2010.
- Gagnon, Cécile. Justine et Sofia au pays des bleuets: un roman, 2010.
- Brousseau, Linda. Le vrai père de Marélie, 2010.
- Luca, Françoise de. Jason et la tortue des bois: un roman, 2011.
- Brousseau, Linda. Marélie et les sanglots de l'oie bleue: roman, 2011.
- Gratton, Andrée-Anne. Simon et les grands cornichons: roman, 2012.
- Sauriol, Louise-Michelle. Les ogres du printemps, 2012.
- Renaud, Anne. Les pierres d'Emma, 2012.
- Hughes, Susan. Adorable Choco, 2013.
- Hughes, Susan. Gentille Mirabelle, 2013.
- Sauriol, Louise-Michelle. Le mysterère du trésor noir: roman jeunesse, 2014.
- Hughes, Susan. Incroyable Zorro, 2014.
- Arsenault, Marie-Andrée. Les souvenirs du sable, 2014.
- Canciani, Katia. Le dromadaire au nez rouge: un conte de Noël avant Noël et dans le désert, 2014.
- Papineau, Lucie. Petit Écureuil à l'école des couleurs, 2014.
- Hughes, Susan. Houdini a disparu, 2015.
- Bellingham, Brenda. Les princesses ne portent pas de jeans, 2015.
- Brien, Sylvie. Valentin, ni trop petit, ni trop grand, 2015.
- Canciani, Katia. Le voyage en Chine, 2015.
- Brien, Sylvie. Jérôme et son fantôme, 2015.
- Hughes, Susan. Cajou en spectacle, 2015.
- Héloua, Laïla. La disparition de monsieur Bonjour, 2015.
- Hughes, Susan. Fripon le curieux, 2015.
- De Repentigny, Myriam & Pratte, Guy. Le mur de feu, 2016.
- Brien, Sylvie. Les têtes coupées, 2016.
- Hughes, Susan. Muscade s'ennuie, 2016.
- Arsenault, Marie-Andrèe. La traversée des mers, 2017.
- Pratte, Guy. Ted et les oiseaux de paradis, 2018.
- Labrie, Francine. Dans la peau des autres, 2019.

==== in English ====
- Allen, Eleanor. Ghost From the Sea, 1995.
- Bennett, Leonie. Pattern and Rhyme, 1996.
- Snihura, Ulana. I Miss Franklin P. Shuckles, 1998.
- Pawagi, Manjusha. The Girl Who Hated Books, 1998.
- Tregebov, Rhea. What-If Sara, 1999.
- Larose, Linda. Jessica Takes Charge, 1999.
- Martenova Charles, Veronika. Don't Open the Door!: Easy-To-Read Spooky Tales, 2000.
- Marlowe, Pete. The Trailer Park Princess, 2000.
- Adler, David A. Andy Russell, NOT Wanted by Police, 2001.
- Packard, Mary. Ripley's Believe it or Not! Big Book Special Edition, 2001.
- Packard, Mary. Ripley's Believe it or Not! World's Weirdest Critters, 2001.
- Packard, Mary. Ripley's Believe it or Not! Amazing Escapes, 2001.
- Roberts, Ken. The Thumb in The Box, 2001.
- Ross Enderle, Judith & Jacob Gordon, Stephanie. School Stinks, 2001.
- Martenova Charles, Veronika. Don't Go Into the Forest!, 2001.
- Packard, Mary. Ripley's Believe it or Not! Creepy Stuff, 2001.
- Poploff, Michelle. Pajama Party, 2002.
- Packard, Mary. Ripley's Believe it or Not! Odd-inary People, 2002.
- Packard, Mary. Ripley's Believe it or Not! Bizarre Bugs, 2002.
- Packard, Mary. Ripley's Believe it or Not! Awesome Animals, 2002.
- Packard, Mary. Ripley's Believe it or Not! Weird Science, 2003.
- Packard, Mary. Ripley's Believe it or Not! Blasts From The Past, 2003.
- Packard, Mary. Ripley's Believe it or Not! X-Traordinary X-Tremes, 2003.
- Sauriol, Louise-Michelle. Les trouvailles d'Adami, 2004.
- Il était une fois: 12 histoires à raconter, 2005.
- Adler, David A. It's a Baby, Andy Russel!, 2005.
- Roberts, Ken. Thumb on a Diamond, 2006.
- Wishinsky, Frieda. Far From Home, Canadian Flyer Adventures #11, 2008.
- Wishinsky, Frieda. Lost in the Snow, Canadian Flyer Adventures #10, 2008.
- Wishinsky, Frieda. All Aboard!, Canadian Flyer Adventures #9, 2008.
- Roberts, Ken. Thumb and the Bad Guys, 2011.
- Pierce, Jacqueline. The Mystery of the Missing Luck, 2011.
- Pierce, Jacqueline. Flood Warning!, 2012.
- Hughes, Susan. Bailey's Visit, 2013.
- Hughes, Susan. Riley Knows Best, 2013.
- Hughes, Susan. Murphy Helps Out, 2014.
- Hughes, Susan. Bijou Needs a Home, 2014.
- Hughes, Susan. Piper's First Snow, 2015.
- Bellingham, Brenda. Princesses Don't Wear Jeans, 2015.
- Hughes, Susan. Cricket's Close Call, 2015.
- Gjenero Bilich, Mary. Marko Gets a Puppy, 2015.
- Hughes, Susan. Nutmeg All Alone, 2016.
- Hughes, Susan. Houdini's Escape, 2016.
- Hull, Maureen. Rainy Days with Bear, 2016.
- Renaud, Anne. Emma's Gems, 2019.
- Hughes, Susan. Puppy Pals, 2019.
- Alistair, Gwynevere. Calm Before the Test, 2020. t

== Awards ==
In 1997, Franson was a finalist for a Governor General's Award for her illustration work on L'Ourson qui voulait une Juliette.

== Exhibitions ==
Leanne Franson was featured in "She Draws Comics", curated by Trina Robbins. The exhibition began in 2002 in Vienna at Secession Gallery, traveled to Gijon in that same year. The exhibition would then go to San Francisco in 2003, and finally end in 2006 in NYC at the Museum of Comic and Cartoon Art.
