= 1992 Governor General's Awards =

Canadian literary award

Each winner of the 1992 Governor General's Awards for Literary Merit received C$10,000 and a medal from the Governor General of Canada. The winners were selected by a panel of judges administered by the Canada Council for the Arts.

== English ==
Category	Winner	Nominated
Fiction	Michael Ondaatje, The English Patient	Sandra Birdsell, The Chrome Suite; Archie Crail, The Bonus Deal; John Steffler, The Afterlife of George Cartwright; Sheila Watson, Deep Hollow Creek
Non-fiction	Maggie Siggins, Revenge of the Land: A Century of Greed, Tragedy and Murder on a Saskatchewan Farm	Michael Bliss, Plague: A Story of Smallpox in Montreal; Ken Cuthbertson, Inside: The Biography of John Gunther; Michael R. Marrus, Mr. Sam: The Life and Times of Samuel Bronfman
Poetry	Lorna Crozier, Inventing the Hawk	Evelyn Lau, Oedipal Dreams; Laura Lush, Hometown; Steve McCaffery, Theory of Sediment; Kathleen McCracken, Blue Light, Bay and College
Drama	John Mighton, Possible Worlds and A Short History of Night	Daniel Brooks and Guillermo Verdecchia, The Noam Chomsky Lectures; Dave Carley, Writing With Our Feet; Judith Thompson, Lion in the Streets; Dianne Warren, Serpent in the Night Sky
Children's literature	Julie Johnston, Hero of Lesser Causes	Margaret Buffie, My Mother's Ghost; John Ibbitson, 1812: Jeremy and the General; Thomas King, A Coyote Columbus Story; Kit Pearson, Looking at the Moon
Children's illustration	Ron Lightburn, Waiting for the Whales	Eric Beddows, Zoom Upstream; Suzanne Duranceau, Hickory, Dickory, Dock; Maryann Kovalski, The Big Storm; Mireille Levert, When Jeremiah Found Mrs. Ming
French to English translation	Fred A. Reed, Imagining the Middle East (Thierry Hentsch, L'Orient imaginaire)	Neil B. Bishop, Death of the Spider (Michèle Mailhot, La mort de l'araignée); Sheila Fischman, Felicity's Fool (François Gravel, Bonheur fou); Luise von Flotow, Deathly Delights (Anne Dandurand, L'Assassin de l'intérieur / Diables d'espoir); Agnes Whitfield, Divine Diva (Daniel Gagnon, Venite a cantare)

== French Language ==
Category	Winner	Nominated
Fiction	Anne Hébert, L'enfant chargé de songes	Lise Bissonnette, Marie suivait l'été; Louis Lefebvre, Guanahani; Gilles Pellerin, Je reviens avec la nuit; Louise Simard, La très noble demoiselle
Non-fiction	Pierre Turgeon, La Radissonie. Le pays de la baie James	Gilles Boileau, Le silence des Messieurs. Oka, terre indienne; Jean Marcel, Pensées, passions et proses; Pierre Morency, Lumière des oiseaux; Louis Sabourin, Passion d'être, désir d'avoir
Poetry	Gilles Cyr, Andromède attendra	Paul Bélanger, Retours suivi de Minuit, l'aube; Yves Boisvert, La balance du vent; Pierre Ouellet, Fonds suivi de Faix; Jean-Noël Pontbriand, Lieux – Passages
Drama	Louis-Dominique Lavigne, Les petits orteils	Dominic Champagne, La cité interdite; Robert Claing, Anna; Marie Laberge, Pierre ou la consolation; Marthe Mercure, Tu faisais comme un appel
Children's literature	Christiane Duchesne, Victor	Linda Brousseau, Coups durs pour une sorcière; Dominique Demers, Un hiver de tourmente; Esther Rochon, L'ombre et le cheval; Daniel Sernine, Les rêves d'Argus
Children's illustration	Gilles Tibo, Simon et la ville de carton	Honey Fox, Le bébé de Lulu; Pierre Pratt, Léon sans son chapeau; Daniel Sylvestre, Mais qui va trouver le trésor?
English to French translation	Jean Papineau, La mémoire postmoderne (Mark A. Cheetham, Remembering Postmodernism: Trends in Recent Canadian Art)	Marie-Luce Constant, Les princes marchands (Peter C. Newman, Company of Adventurers); Hervé Juste, Le Canada aux enchères (Linda McQuaig, The Quick and the Dead); Michèle Marineau, Le monde merveilleux de Marigold (Lucy Maud Montgomery, Magic for Marigold)
