= Iris (artist) =

Canadian comics artist

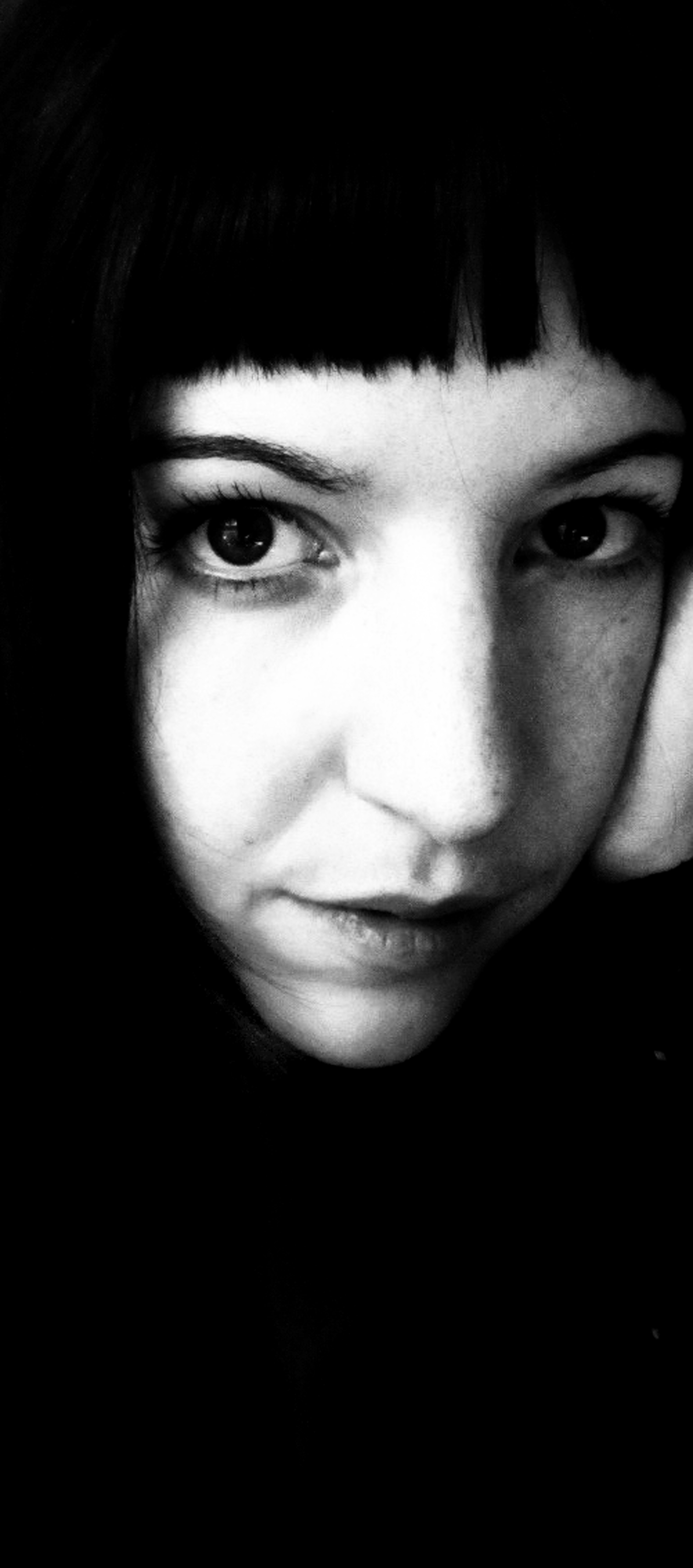
- Born: 1983 (age 42–43) Hull, Quebec
- Genre: comic book

Iris Boudreau-Jeanneau, who publishes under the name Iris, (born 1983) is a Canadian comic book artist living in Quebec.

She was born in the Pointe-Gatineau neighbourhood of Hull (now part of Gatineau) and received a diploma from the École multidisciplinaire de l'image of the Université du Québec en Outaouais in 2006. Iris moved to Montreal the following year, devoting herself to visual arts.

== Selected work ==
- Dans mes rellignes (2006)
- Justin (2010)
- Pour en finir avec le sexe, illustrator, text by Caroline Allard (2011)
- L'ostie d'chat, in collaboration with Zviane (Sylvie-Anne Ménard) )2013)
- Le pouvoir de l'amour et autres vaines romances, illustrator, text by Yves Pelletier (2014)
- Lac Adélard, illustrator, text by François Blais (2019)
