= 1996 Governor General's Awards =

Canadian literary award

The 1996 Governor General's Awards for Literary Merit were presented on November 13, 1996.

== English ==
Category	Winner	Nominated
Fiction	Guy Vanderhaeghe, The Englishman's Boy	Margaret Atwood, Alias Grace; Elisabeth Harvor, Let Me Be the One; Janice Kulyk Keefer, The Green Library; Cordelia Strube, Teaching Pigs to Sing; Audrey Thomas, Coming Down from Wa
Non-fiction	John Ralston Saul, The Unconscious Civilization	Roy MacGregor, The Home Team – Fathers, Sons & Hockey; T. F. Rigelhof, A Blue Boy in a Black Dress; Lake Sagaris, After the First Death: A Journey Through Chile, Time, Mind; Merilyn Simonds, The Convict Lover
Poetry	E. D. Blodgett, Apostrophes: Woman at a Piano	Elizabeth Brewster, Footnotes to the Book of Job; Crispin Elsted, Climate and the Affections; Charles Lillard, Shadow Weather; Erín Moure, Search Procedures
Drama	Colleen Wagner, The Monument	Wendy Lill, The Glace Bay Miners' Museum; John Mighton, The Little Years; Michael O'Brien, Mad Boy Chronicle; Betty Quan, Mother Tongue
Children's literature	Paul Yee, Ghost Train	Jan Andrews, Keri; David Boyd, Bottom Drawer; Gillian Chan, Glory Days and Other Stories; Don Gillmor, The Fabulous Song
Children's illustration	Eric Beddows, The Rooster's Gift	Alan Daniel and Lea Daniel, Sody Salleratus; Wang Kui, The Wise Washerman – A Folktale from Burma; Johnny Wales, Gruntle Piggle Takes Off; Werner Zimmermann, Whatever You Do, Don't Go Near That Canoe!
French to English translation	Linda Gaboriau, Stone and Ashes (Daniel Danis, Cendres de cailloux)	Sheila Fischman, Ostend (François Gravel, Ostende); D. G. Jones, For Orchestra and Solo Poet (Émile Martel, Pour orchestre et poète seul); Shelley Tepperman, In Vitro (Yvan Bienvenue, In vitro)

== French ==
Category	Winner	Nominated
Fiction	Marie-Claire Blais, Soifs	Nancy Huston, Instruments des ténèbres; Roger Magini, Un homme défait; Jocelyne Saucier, La vie comme une image; Lise Vaillancourt, L'Été des eiders
Non-fiction	Michel Freitag, Le Naufrage de l'université – Et autres essais d'épistémologie politique	Gérard Bouchard, Quelques arpents d'Amérique – Population, économie, famille au Saguenay 1838–1971; Gilles Lapointe, L'Envol des signes – Borduas et ses lettres; Benoît Melançon, Diderot épistolier – Contribution à une poétique de la lettre familière au XVIIIe siècle; Denis Vaugeois, La Fin des alliances franco-indiennes – Enquête sur un sauf-conduit de 1760 devenu un traité en 1990
Poetry	Serge Patrice Thibodeau Le Quatuor de l'errance / La Traversée du désert	José Acquelin, L'Oiseau respirable; Jean Charlebois, De moins en moins l'amour de plus en plus; Herménégilde Chiasson, Climats; Louise Cotnoir, Dis-moi que j'imagine
Drama	Normand Chaurette, Le Passage de l'Indiana	Suzanne Lebeau, Salvador – La Montagne, l'enfant et la mangue; Wajdi Mouawad, Alphonse
Children's literature	Gilles Tibo, Noémie – Le Secret de Madame Lumbago	Sylvie Desrosiers, Le Long silence; Jacinthe Gaulin, Mon p'tit frère; Daniel Sernine, L'Arc-en-cercle; Hélène Vachon, Le Plus proche voisin
Children's illustration	No award presented	
English to French translation	Christiane Teasdale, Systèmes de survie – Dialogue sur les fondements moraux du commerce et de la politique	Pierre DesRuisseaux, Contre-taille – Poèmes choisis de vingt-cinq auteurs canadiens-anglais; Hélène Le Beau, Les Dangers de la pensée critique – Trois nouvelles
