= Rachna Gilmore =

Canadian writer (1953–2021)

- Born: October 11, 1953; India
- Died: February 1, 2021 (aged 67); Ottawa, Canada
- Occupation: Children's novelist
- Website: rachnagilmore.ca

Rachna Gilmore (11 October 1953 – 1 February 2021) was a Canadian children's writer. Her picture book A Screaming Kind of Day won the 1999 Governor General's Award for Children's Literature.

== Life and career ==
Born in India in October 1953, Gilmore emigrated from New Delhi to London as a teenager and studied biology at University of London. After emigrating to Canada in the mid-1970s, she studied education of the University of Prince Edward Island. In 1990 Gilmore and her family moved to Ottawa. She wrote literature for children and young adults, mainly, but also fiction for adults.

Gilmore died in February 2021, at the age of 67.

== Works ==
Picture books

- My Mother is Weird (1988)
- When I Was A Little Girl (1989)
- Jane's Loud Mouth (1990)
- Aunt Fred is a Witch (1991)
- Lights for Gita (1994)
- Roses for Gita (1996)
- Wild Rilla (1997)
- A Gift for Gita (1998)
- A Screaming Kind of Day (1999)
- Grandpa's Clock (2006)
- Making Grizzle Grow (2007)
- Catching Time (2010)
- The Flute (2011)

Children's novels

- A Friend Like Zilla (1995)
- Mina's Spring of Colors (2000)
- A Group of One (2001)
- The Sower of Tales (2005)
- The Trouble With Dilly (2009)
- That Boy Red (2011)

Early readers

- Ellen's Terrible TV Trouble (1999)
- Fangs and Me (1999)

Non-fiction

- Snapshots From The Fringes (2010)

Adult fiction

- Of Customs and Excise (1991, under pseudonym Rachna Mara)
