= Laura Lush =

Canadian poet and short story writer (born 1959)

Laura Lush (born 1959) is a Canadian poet and short story writer. She is most noted for her 1992 poetry book Hometown, which was a shortlisted finalist for the Governor General's Award for English-language poetry at the 1992 Governor General's Awards.

She has since published the poetry collections Fault Line (1997) and The First Day of Winter (2003), and the short story collection Going to the Zoo (2003).
