= François Gravel =

Canadian writer from Quebec (born 1951)

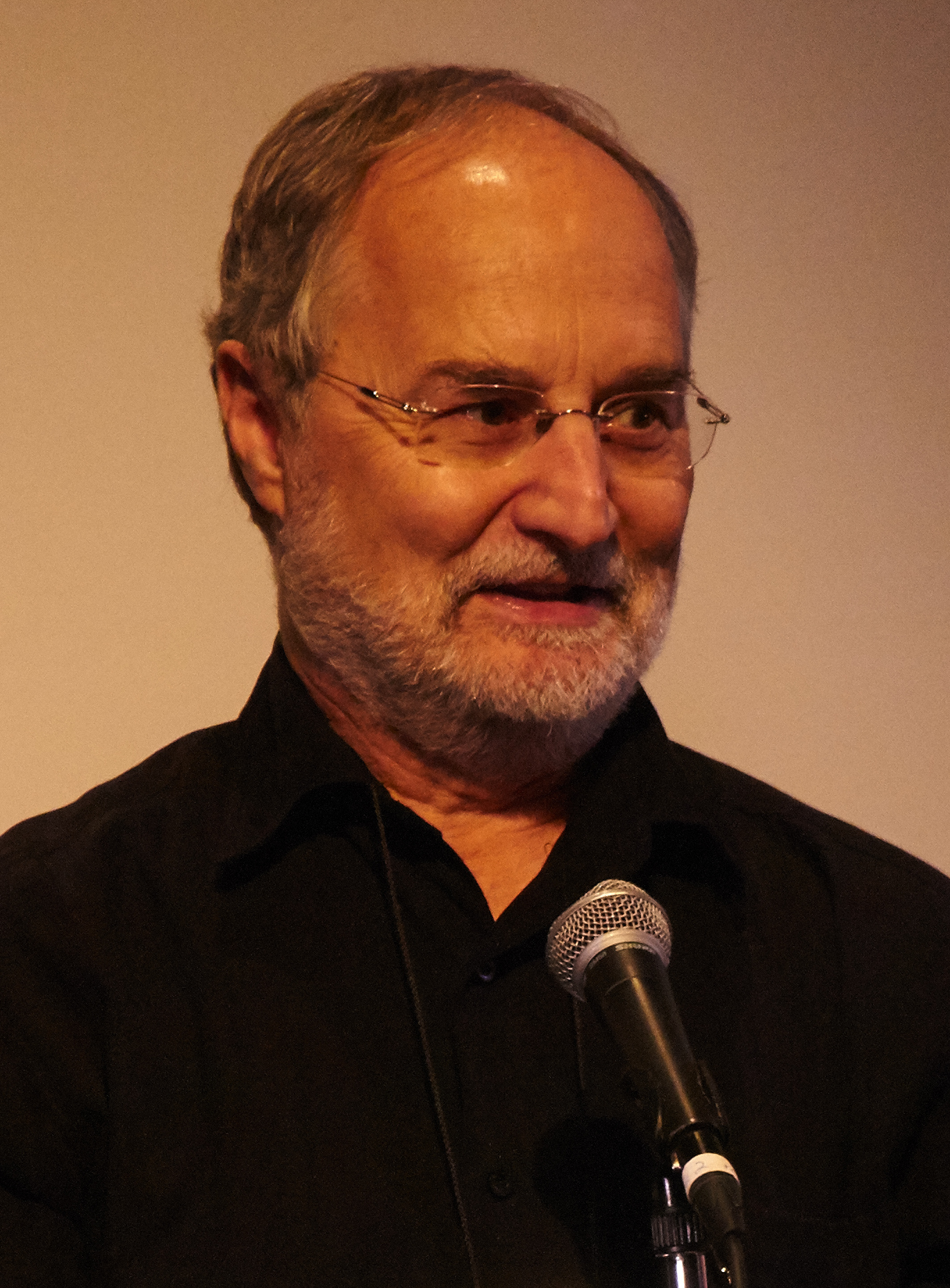
- Born: October 25, 1951 (age 74); Montreal, Quebec, Canada
- Occupations: novelist, young adult writer
- Writing career
- Language: French
- Notable works: Ostende, Fillion et frères, Adieu, Betty Crocker

François Gravel (born October 4, 1951) is a Canadian writer from Quebec. Most noted as an author of literature for children and young adults, he has also published a number of adult novels.

An economics graduate of the Université du Québec à Montréal, Gravel taught economics at Cégep Saint-Jean-sur-Richelieu until 2006. He is the partner of writer Michèle Marineau and the father of writer and illustrator Élise Gravel.

His most recent adult novel, À vos ordres, colonel Parkinson!, was inspired by his own recent diagnosis with Parkinson's disease. This book is available in an English translation titled "Colonel Parkinson in Charge: A Wry Reflection on My Incurable Illness" (House of Anansi Press, 2023), translated by Shelley Pomerance.

Many of his works have been translated into English by Sheila Fischman.

== Awards ==
He won the Governor General's Award for French-language children's literature at the 1991 Governor General's Awards for Deux heures et demie avant Jasmine. He has been shortlisted for the award five other times: at the 1994 Governor General's Awards for Klonk, at the 2000 Governor General's Awards for L'été de la moustache, at the 2002 Governor General's Awards for David et la maison de la sorcière, at the 2008 Governor General's Awards for Sales crapauds and at the 2012 Governor General's Awards for Hò.

Fischman has received three nominations for the Governor General's Award for French to English translation for her translations of Gravel's work at the 1990 Governor General's Awards for Benito, the 1992 Governor General's Awards for Felicity's Fool (Bonheur fou) and the 1996 Governor General's Awards for Ostende.

Gravel won the French Mr. Christie's Book Award in 1991 for Zamboni, and in 2001 for David et le fantôme in conjunction with illustrator Pierre Pratt. Gravel and Pratt won the French TD Canadian Children's Literature Award in 2006 for David et le salon funéraire.

His adult novel Adieu, Betty Crocker was a competing title in the 2014 edition of Le Combat des livres, where it was defended by actress Pauline Martin.

== Works ==
=== Novels ===
- La Note de passage, 1985
- Benito, 1987
- Effet Summerhill, 1988
- Bonheur fou, 1989
- Les Black Stones vous reviendront dans quelques instants, 1991
- Ostende, 1994
- Miss Septembre, 1996
- Vingt et un tableaux (et quelques craies), 1998
- Fillion et frères, 2000
- Je ne comprends pas tout, 2002
- Adieu, Betty Crocker, 2003
- Mélamine Blues, 2005
- Vous êtes ici, 2007
- Voyeurs, s'abstenir, 2009
- À deux pas de chez elle: La première enquête de Chloé Perreault, 2011
- Toute une vie sur les bancs d’école, 2016
- Idées noires, 2017
- La petite fille en haut de l’escalier, 2018
- À vos ordres, colonel Parkinson!, 2019
- Colonel Parkinson in Charge, 2023 (non-fiction)

=== Children's and young adult literature ===
==== Klonk series ====
1. Klonk, 1993
2. Lance et Klonk, 1994
3. Le Cercueil de Klonk, 1995
4. Un amour de Klonk, 1995
5. Le Cauchemar de Klonk, 1997
6. Klonk et le Beatle mouillé, 1997
7. Klonk et le Treize noir, 1999
8. Klonk et la Queue du scorpion, 2000
9. Coca-Klonk, 2001
10. La Racine carrée de Klonk, 2002
11. Le Testament de Klonk, 2003
12. Klonk contre Klonk, 2004

==== David series ====
1. David et le Fantôme, 2000
2. David et le Précipice, 2001
3. David et les Monstres de la forêt, 2001
4. David et la Maison de la sorcière, 2002
5. David et l'Orage, 2003
6. David et les Crabes noirs, 2004
7. David et le Salon funéraire, 2005
8. David et la Bête, 2007
9. David et Léa, 2008

==== Other ====
- Corneilles, 1989
- Zamboni, 1990
- Deux heures et demie avant Jasmine, 1991
- Granulite, 1992
- Guillaume, 1995
- Le Match des étoiles, 1996
- Kate, quelque part
- L'Été de la moustache, 2000
- La Piste sauvage, 2002
- L'Araignée sauvage, 2004
- Sekhmet, la déesse sauvage, 2005
- Sacrilège, 2006
- Les Horloges de M. Svonok, 2007
- Sales Crapauds, 2007
- La Cagoule, 2008
- Sauvage, 2010
- Du soccer extrême !, 2010
- Ça, c'est du baseball, 2010
- Ok pour le hockey !, 2011
- Il pleut des records, 2011
- Silence, on zappe !, 2012
- Schlick, 2012
- Hò, 2012
- À nous deux, Barbe-Mauve !, 2012
- Hollywood, nous voici, 2013
