= Elise Gravel =

Canadian children's book author

- Born: 10 January 1977 (age 49); Montreal, Canada
- Occupations: Writer, cartoonist, illustrator
- Relatives: François Gravel (father) Michèle Marineau (stepmother)
- Writing career
- Notable awards: Governor General's Award for French-language children's illustration (2012); (2015); Vicky Metcalf Award (2022)
- Website: elisegravel.com/en

Élise Gravel (born 10 January 1977) is a Canadian author and illustrator from Montreal, Quebec.

Gravel's original books and graphic novels focus on whimsical characters, social justice issues, and biodiversity. She cites children's author Roald Dahl and illustrator Quentin Blake as major sources of inspiration.

Gravel has written more than fifty books, and her work has been translated into over twelve languages. She studied graphic design at Collège Ahuntsic, before becoming an illustrator.

Gravel publishes in both English and in French. She has worked with several different publishing houses, including Montreal-based comics publisher Drawn & Quarterly.

In September 2021, Gravel's original artwork was featured on a series of stamps for the U.S. Postal Service. The 'Message Monsters' stamp design was interactive and playful with the inclusion of dozens of accessory stickers.

In February 2024, the Jewish Public Library of Montreal moved her books to their closed stacks, following Instagram posts that the Centre for Israel and Jewish Affairs described as antisemitic. A few days later, the library restored the books.

== Personal life ==
Gravel is the daughter of writer François Gravel and Murielle Grégoire. She is married and lives in Montreal. She has two daughters. In 2026, Gravel endorsed Avi Lewis in that year's federal NDP leadership race.

== Awards and recognition ==
- 2012 Governor General's Award for Children's Illustration in French for La clé à molette.
- 2019 The Rights and Freedoms Award from the Quebec Commission des droits de la personne et des droits de la jeunesse in honour of her body of work.
- 2022 Vicky Metcalf Award for Literature for Young People from the Writers' Trust of Canada in honour of her body of work.
- 2024 Ruth and Sylvia Schwartz Children's Book Award (Ontario Arts Foundation) for Nutshimit: In the Woods.
- 2025 Appointed to the Order of Canada.

== Selected works ==
- Balloon Toons: Adopt A Glurb (Blue Apple Books, 2010, ISBN 978-1609050375)
- Blast Off With Doodle Tom (Blue Apple Books, 2012 ISBN 978-1609052638)
- Jessie Elliot Is a Big Chicken (Roaring Brook Press, 2014, ISBN 978-1596437418)
- The Great Antonio (TOON Books, 2016, ISBN 978-1943145089)
- I Want a Monster! (HarperCollins, 2016, ISBN 978-0062415332)
- The Cranky Ballerina: A Graphic Novel (HarperCollins, 2016, ISBN 978-0062351241)
- Head Lice: The Disgusting Critters Series (Tundra Books, 2016, ISBN 978-1101918531)
- The Spider: The Disgusting Critters Series (Tundra Books, 2016, ISBN 978-1101918548)
- The Rat: The Disgusting Critters Series (Tundra Books, 2016, ISBN 978-1770496590)
- The Slug: The Disgusting Critters Series (Tundra Books, 2016, ISBN 978-1770496569)
- The Toad: The Disgusting Critters Series (Tundra Books, 2016, ISBN 978-1770496675)
- The Worm: The Disgusting Critters Series (Tundra Books, 2016, ISBN 978-1101918418)
- The Fly: The Disgusting Critters Series (Tundra Books, 2016, ISBN 978-1101918401)
- If Found...Please Return to Elise Gravel (Drawn & Quarterly, 2017, ISBN 978-1770462786)
- Olga and the Smelly Thing from Nowhere (Olga, 1) (HarperCollins, 2017, ISBN 978-0062351265)
- Olga: We're Out of Here! (Olga, 2) (HarperCollins, 2018, ISBN 978-0062351296)
- The Mushroom Fan Club (Drawn and Quarterly, 2018, ISBN 978-1770463226)
- You Can Be (The Innovation Press, 2018, ISBN 978-1943147403)
- A Potato on a Bike (Orca Book Publishers, 2019, ISBN 978-1459823204)
- Olga: Out of Control! (Olga, 3) (HarperCollins, 2019, ISBN 978-0062351326)
- The Worst Book Ever (Drawn & Quarterly, 2019, ISBN 978-1770463639)
- What Is a Refugee? (Anne Schwartz Books, 2019, ISBN 978-0593120057)
- Arlo & Pips: King of the Birds (HarperAlley, 2020, ISBN 978-0062982223)
- I Am Scary (Orca Book Publishers, 2020, ISBN 978-1459823167)
- Not Me! (North Winds Press, 2020, ISBN 978-1443181747)
- Arlo & Pips #2: Join the Crow Crowd! (HarperAlley, 2021, ISBN 978-0063050778)
- The Bug Club (Drawn & Quarterly, 2021, ISBN 978-1770464155)
- Everybody!: You, Me & Us (Scholastic Press, 2022, ISBN 978-1338830897)
- It's My Body! (Scholastic Canada, 2022, ISBN 978-1443196505)
- Pink, Blue, and You!: Questions for Kids about Gender Stereotypes with Mykaell Blais (Anne Schwartz Books, 2022, ISBN 978-0593178638)
- Nutshimit: In the Woods, author Melissa Mollen Dupuis (North Winds Press, 2023, ISBN 978-1039701809)
- Club Microbe (Drawn & Quarterly, 2024 ISBN 978-1770467026)
- True Colors: Growing Up Weird in the '90s (Drawn & Quarterly, 2025, ISBN 978-1770467996)
