= Liliane, Bi-Dyke =

Webcomic

Liliane, Bi-Dyke or Liliane is a semi-autobiographical webcomic written by Leanne Franson that ran from 1999 to 2004. It covers Franson's personal experiences in her day-to-day life as a bisexual woman. The series addresses themes of sexual orientation, polyamory, and motherhood. The comic was published online as a webcomic, as physical zines through Franson's website, and as three anthology books.

== Background ==
Franson cites her inspiration for giving her the confidence in creating the series as Alison Bechdel who called Franson a genius after looking through her sketchbook. She states that her style was influenced by that of Ben Wicks and Lynne Johnston. The comic is drawn in a simple cartoonish black and white style. The series used to be referred to as Liliane instead of Liliane, Bi-Dyke. It is unclear when exactly this name change occurred.

=== Anthologies ===
The comic has been published in three anthologies: Teaching Through Trauma (1999), Assume Nothing: Evolution of a Bi-Dyke (2000), and Don't Be A Crotte (2004). Each anthology compiles a set of issues of Liliane, Bi-Dyke that covers a different part of Liliane / Leanne's life.

=== Teaching Through Trauma (1999) ===
This anthology discusses Liliane's experience accidentally killing her hamsters as a child, discussing the onset of menarche with her father, and her pursuit of pregnancy through artificial insemination. The anthology includes the comics "Untimely Hamster Deaths", "Old Wives' Tales", and "Real Lesbians Don't Procreate".

=== Assume Nothing: Evolution of a Bi-Dyke (2000) ===
This anthology discusses Liliane's experiences coming out as a lesbian, pining for a gay man, engaging in an open lesbian relationship and participating in a lesbian caucus on her college campus. The anthology includes the comics "Impeccable Taste", "Loose Skin", "Proximal Possibilities of Dating and Dogs", "Mixed Blessings", "Flicks and Finales", "Breeders", "Do It Myself", and "Breeders Too".

=== Don't Be A Crotte (2004) ===
This anthology discusses Liliane's experiences posing for a pornographer for extra cash, struggling to move, being questioned about her bisexuality at an art show, and being lied to about the safe sexual practices of one of her boyfriends. The anthology includes the comics "I Posed for a Pornographer", "Slum Landlord Liliane", "Yes We Don't Want No Bisexuals Part 1", "The Ex and the VCR", "How to Screw Someone Around", "Yes We Don't Want No Bisexuals Part 2", and "Attack of the Inflated Ego".

== Analysis ==
A 2001 review of Assume Nothing: Evolution of a Bi-Dyke and Teaching Through Trauma by Beren de Motier praised Franson for her bravery in depicting a politically empowered bisexual woman. De Motier also praises Franson for her depiction of Liliane as "sex-positive yet aware of sex's power implications, capable of moving in the world of lesbians, straight men, gay men, and everything in between with insight and lack of judgment."

Marni Stanley analyzes the political commentary of Liliane, Bi-Dyke concerning identity politics in a 2010 paper published in Canadian Literature. Stanley posits that Liliane, Bi-Dyke argues against "adopting any hierarchy of particular sexual identities" and that Franson instead focuses on a general challenging of heteronormativity. Stanley cites issues of Liliane, Bi-Dyke that discuss how the social identity of dyke has changed over time, femme privilege in the lesbian community, and stigma against bisexual people to support her argument.
