= Terry Griggs =

Canadian author

- Occupations: novelist, short stories
- Writing career
- Period: 1990s-present
- Notable work: Quickening

Terry Griggs is a Canadian author. Her book of short stories Quickening was a finalist at the 1991 Governor General's Awards, and she won the Marian Engel Award in 2003.

Originally from Manitoulin Island, where her family operated a fishing lodge near Little Current, she studied English literature at the University of Western Ontario.

She presently lives in Stratford, Ontario.

== Bibliography ==
- 1990: Quickening (Porcupine's Quill, ISBN 0-88984-111-X)
- 1995: The Lusty Man (Porcupine's Quill, ISBN 0-88984-159-4)
- 2002: Rogue's Wedding (Random House Canada, ISBN 0-679-31144-0)
- 2009: Thought You Were Dead (Biblioasis, ISBN 1-897231-53-9)
- 2009: Quickening (Biblioasis, ISBN 1-897231-57-1)
- 2010: Nieve (Biblioasis, ISBN 978-1-897231-87-6)
- 2017: The Discovery of Honey (Biblioasis, ISBN 177196149X
- 2018: The Iconoclast's Journal (Biblioasis, ISBN 9781771962292

Cat's Eye Corner series

- 2000: Cat's Eye Corner (Raincoast Books, ISBN 1-55192-350-5)
- 2004: The Silver Door (Raincoast Books, ISBN 1-55192-685-7)
- 2006: Invisible Ink (Raincoast Books, ISBN 1-55192-833-7)
