= Lac Adélard =

Novel by François Blais

- 2019 paperback edition
- Author: François Blais
- Illustrator: Iris Boudreau
- Language: French
- Genre: Children, Horror fiction
- Published: 2019
- Publisher: La courte échelle
- Publication place: Canada
- Media type: Print: Paperback; Digital: eBook, PDF
- Pages: 256
- Award: Governor General’s Literary Award
- ISBN: 9782897742249

Lac Adélard is a French novel written by Canadian author François Blais and published in 2019 by La courte échelle. It won the 2020 Governor General's Literary Award for French-language children's literature.

== Backstory ==
Lac Adélard, is a lake in the Mauricie region of Quebec near Blais' home in Grand-Mère which he frequented often. He grew up in the surrounding area and knew it well, which inspired him to anchor the book's characters Anna and Elijah there in present time, and those of Rose-Marie and Sarah, also there but in the past.

When approached by his publisher to participate in its "Collection Noire" book series, Blais had not read a children's novel since youth and decided not to read similar books by other authors. Instead, he relied on his instincts and adjusted his writing to suit the target audience, making the age of the protagonists the differential change between this book and his previous adult novels. Knowing that a younger audience faced a variety of distractions, it was important to him that the readers turn to the next page.

== Synopsis ==
Lac Adélard is the story of Rose-Marie, a nine-year-old girl who disappeared in the summer of 1989 under unusual circumstances while living with her mother and her mother's friend near a small lake in Charette. Thirty years later, teenagers Élie and Anna, find Rose-Marie's diary and take a trip to Lac Adélard in an attempt to unravel the mystery of her disappearance.

== Awards ==
Lac Adélard won the 2020 Governor General’s Award for French-language children literature at the 2020 Governor General's Awards, and was chosen by students across Canada for the 2021 Forest of Reading Award winners.

== Reception ==
The book was generally well received in Blais' home province of Quebec. Marie Fradette writes in Le Devoir, "we constantly feel the author's ease behind the expected seriousness of the story." Camille Gauthier in the journal Les libraires, "True to himself, he also adds a touch of humor and irony to his novel."
