= Sonia Sarfati =

Canadian author and journalist (born 1960)

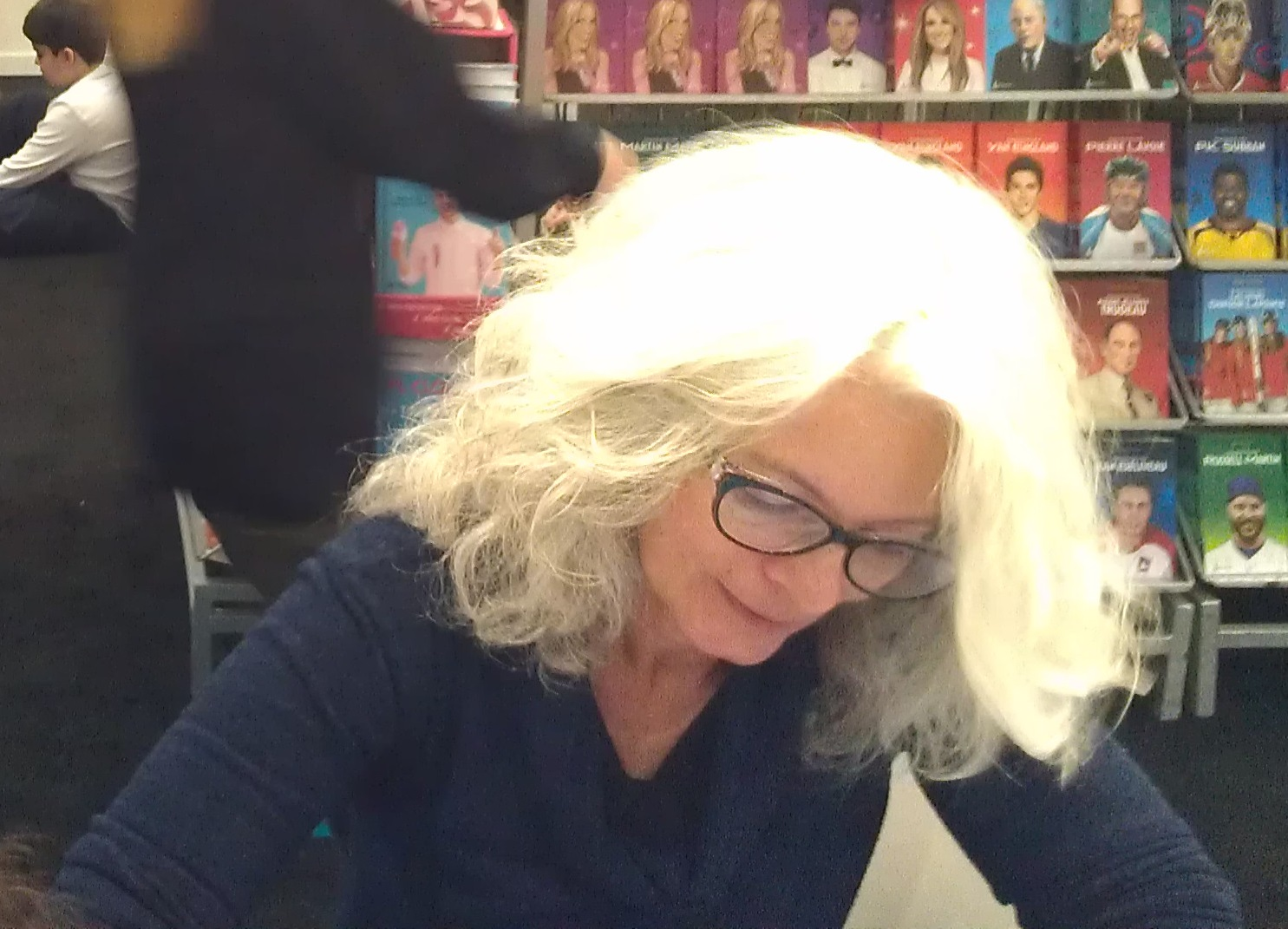
Sonia Sarfati

Sonia Sarfati (born May 29, 1960) is a Canadian author and journalist born in France and living in Quebec.

The daughter of a Tunisian father and an Italian mother, she was born in Toulouse. She moved to Montreal with her family at the age of ten. She studied biology and journalism at the Université de Montréal and went on to teach biology at the secondary level. As well as writing books, Sarfati also contributes to the culture section of La Presse and hosted the radio program VSD bonjour on Radio-Canada.

== Selected works ==
Sources:

- Sauvetages, stories (1989), received the Prix Alvine-Bélisle
- Tricot, piano et jeu vidéo, children's literature (1992)
- La ville engloutie, children's literature (1992)
- Les voix truquées, children's literature (1993)
- La comédienne disparue, children's literature (1994)
- Comme une peau de chagrin, juvenile fiction (1995), received the Governor General's Award for French-language children's literature
