= J.R. Hoell =

American politician

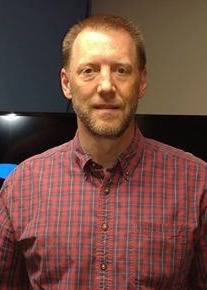
- Hoell in 2016

Member of the New Hampshire House of Representatives from the Merrimack 13th district
- In office 2010–2012

Member of the New Hampshire House of Representatives from the Merrimack 23rd district
- In office 2012–2018

Member of the New Hampshire House of Representatives from the Merrimack 27th district
- Incumbent
- Assumed office December 7, 2022
- Succeeded by: Ray Plante (elect)

Personal details
- Party: Republican

J.R. Hoell is an American politician. He serves as a Republican member for the Merrimack 27th district of the New Hampshire House of Representatives.
