= Lynn Davies (poet) =

Canadian poet

Lynn Davies (born 1954) is a Canadian poet. She is most noted for her poetry collection The Bridge that Carries the Road, which was shortlisted for the Governor General's Award for English-language poetry at the 1999 Governor General's Awards and for the Gerald Lampert Award in 2000.

Born in Moncton, New Brunswick, and raised in Newcastle, Davies travelled abroad for two years after high school and then wrote a weekly travel column for a New Brunswick-based magazine before attending the University of King's College. She was subsequently a writer for publications such as Canadian Geographic, Nature Canada, Outdoor Canada, Arts Atlantic, and The Globe and Mail. She attended the Maritime Writers' Workshop in the 1990s, and began writing poetry only after being told by her classmates that her prose writing had a poetic quality.

The Bridge that Carries the Road, her debut collection, was published in 1999. She followed up with the collections Where Sound Pools in 2005, and how the gods pour tea in 2013.
