= Kathleen McCracken =

Canadian poet (born 1960)

- Born: 1960 (age 65–66) Markdale, Ontario, Canada
- Occupation: Poet

Kathleen McCracken (born 1960 in Markdale, Ontario) is a Canadian poet, who was a shortlisted nominee for the Governor General's Award for English-language poetry at the 1992 Governor General's Awards for her collection Blue Light, Bay and College.

Her other collections have included Reflections (1978), Into Celebration (1980), The Constancy of Objects (1988), A Geography of Souls (2002), Mooncalves (2007), and Tattoo Land (2009), and her poetry has appeared in The Malahat Review, Poetry Canada Review, Exile Quarterly, Poetry Ireland, The Shop, Revival, Abridged, New Orleans Review and Grain.

She has lived in Northern Ireland since 1992, where she teaches English and creative writing at Ulster University.
