= Zviane =

Canadian comics artist (born 1983)

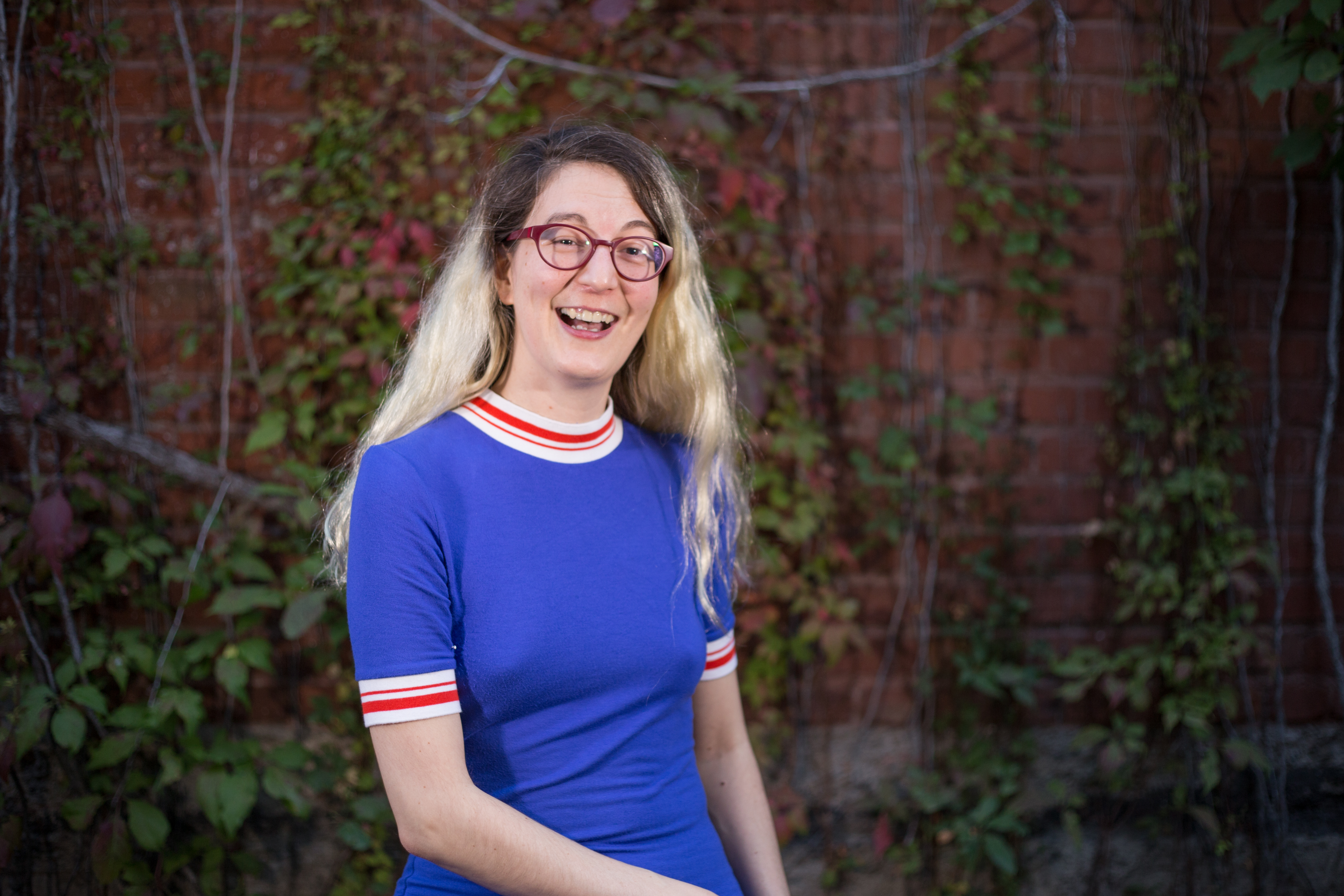
- Zviane at the Sommets du cinéma d'animation in 2017
- Born: Sylvie-Anne Ménard; 1983 (age 42–43) Longueuil, Quebec
- Areas: Writer and artist
- Notable works: Apnée (2011); Les deuxièmes (2013)

Zviane (pen name of Sylvie-Anne Ménard, born in 1983 in Longueuil, Quebec) is a prolific Canadian cartoonist and musician from Montréal, Quebec. she holds a bachelor's degree in composition from the Université de Montréal and initially pursued music before gaining recognition in the comic arts.

Her creative breakthrough came in 2006 when she won the first Concours québécois de bande dessinée with Le point B. Since then, Zviane has produced numerous acclaimed works, including Apnée, Les deuxièmes, and Football-Fantaisie. She earned significant accolades such as the Grand Prix de la Ville de Québec for Apnée (2010) and Les deuxièmes (2014), the Bédélys Prize for Le bestiaire des fruits, and the Joe Shuster Award for Best Cartoonist in 2014.

She is known for blending her musical roots with graphic storytelling, Zviane’s work often features playful, emotionally honest narratives while showcasing her animation, blogging, and music composition pursuits. She also participated in creative residencies such as at the Maison des auteurs in Angoulême.

== Biography ==
A musician since her youth, Zviane earned a baccalaureate in music from Université de Montréal. She teaches music theory and plays piano.

Through the art group Vestibulles in cégep du Vieux Montréal, Zviane's works were noticed by Jimmy Beaulieu, who published them in the collections of publishers Mécanique générale and Colosse. Her web blog was noticed by French creator Boulet, who helped her become better known in Europe. Her work Le point B won a contest earning that book to be published by the Monet Library.

In 2009, Zviane spent six months at the Maison des auteurs in Angoulême.

Zviane publishes several comic works each year. She combines music and comics. Music is almost always present in her comics.

== Publications ==
=== Books and other works ===
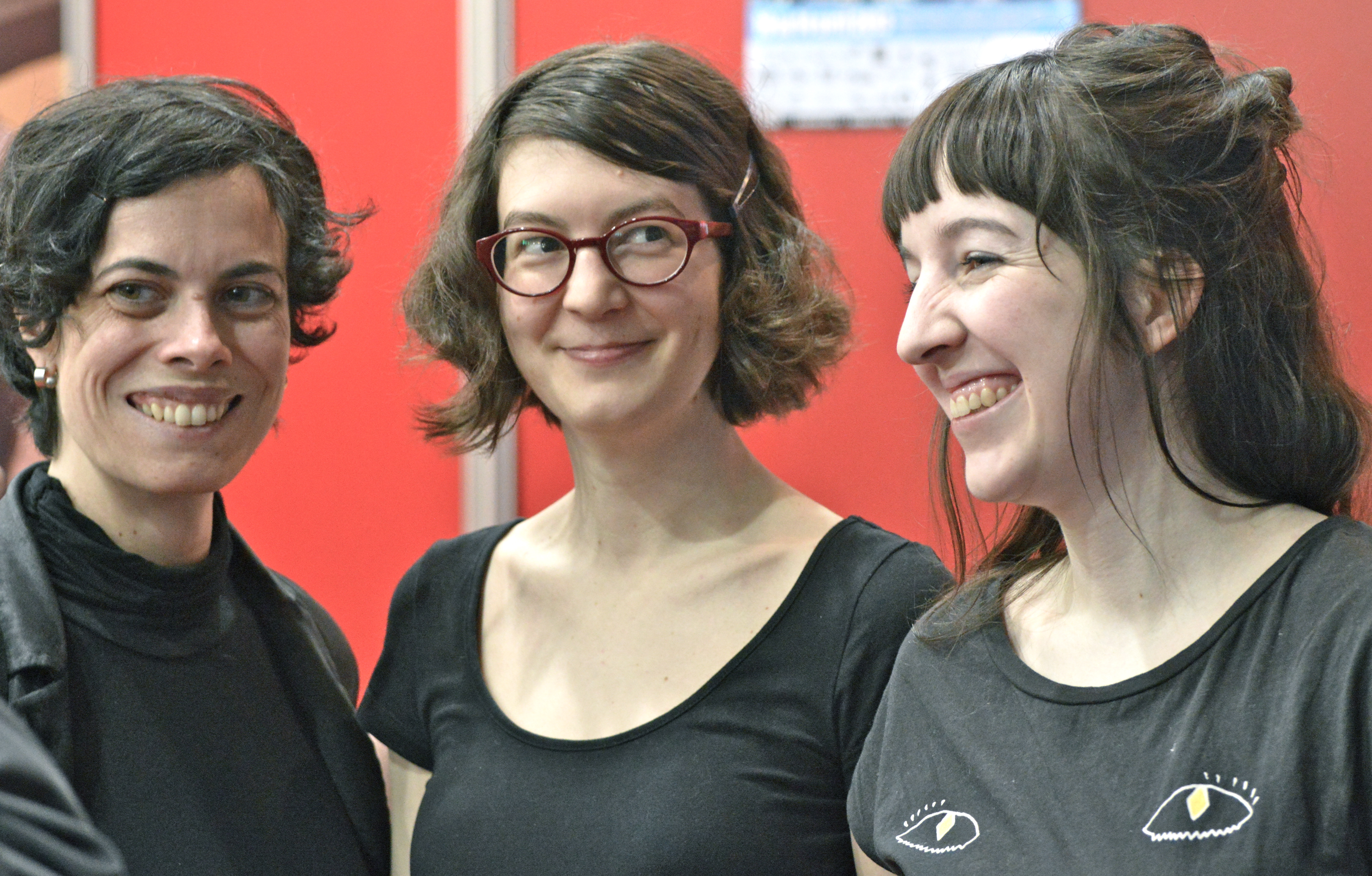
Zviane (center) with comics creators Capucine (left) and Iris (right), at the Québec International Book Fair, 2013

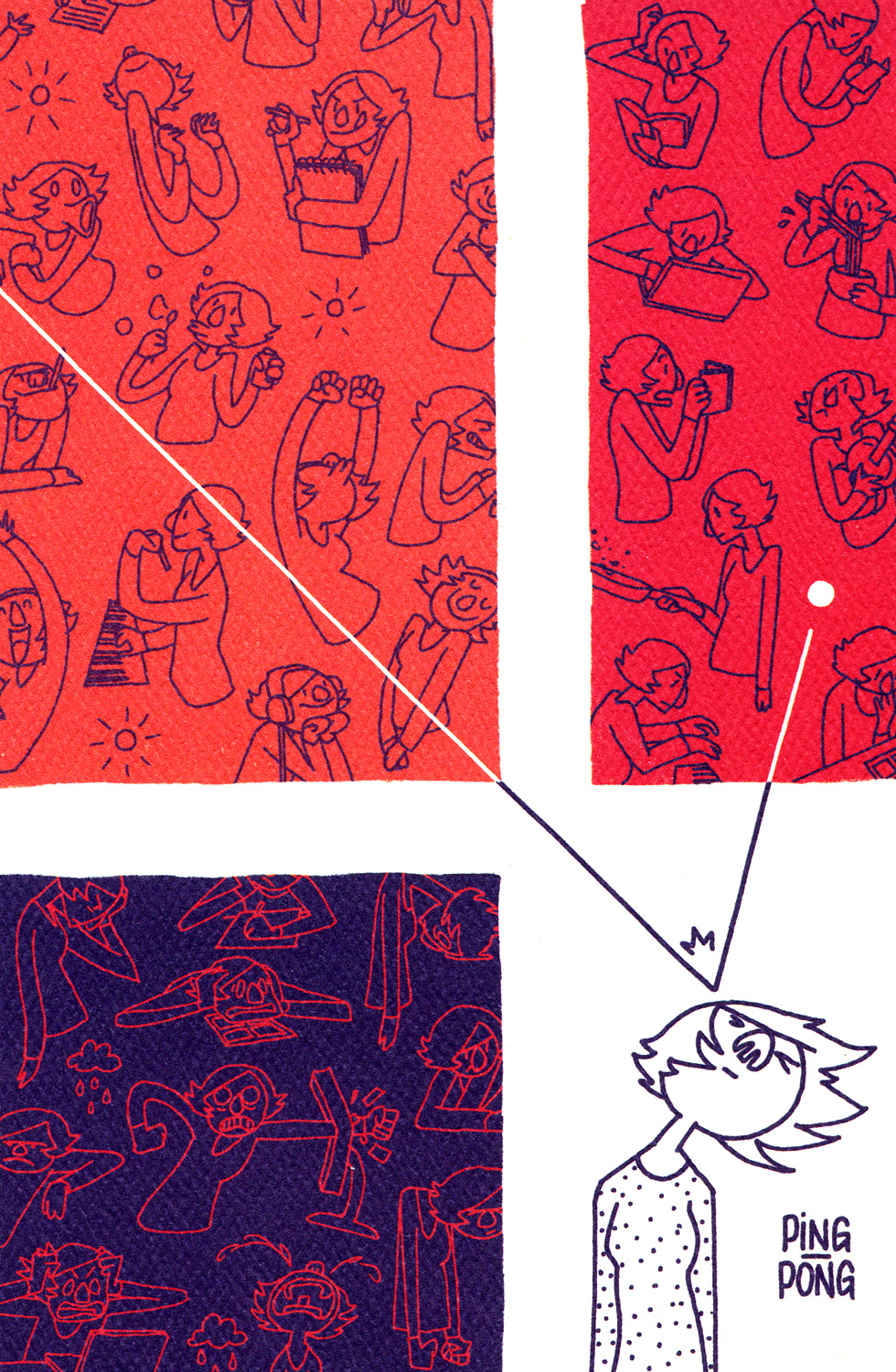
The cover of Ping-pong (2014), "a sort of essay, with lots of text"

- Les constats de la vie que l'on constate, Grafigne.com, coll. "Cœur de loup", 2004
- Dans l'estomac, Grafigne.com, coll. "Cœur de loup", 2005
- Le monstre, Grafigne.com, coll. "Cœur de loup", 2006
- Le point B, Monet éditeur, 2006, 128 p., ISBN 978-2-980966-60-6
- Quelque part entre 9h et 10h, Colosse, 2006
- Comment le dictionnaire fut-il inventé ?, with Charles Ménard as writer, Grafigne.com, coll. "Cœur de loup", 2007
- Des étoiles dans les oreilles, with Martine Rhéaume as cowriter, Société de musique contemporaine du Québec, 2007, ISBN 9782980678295
- La plus jolie fin du monde, éditions Mécanique générale, 2007 ISBN 978-2-922827-36-1
- Étirer un élastique, Fichtre, 2008
- Un incroyable talent, Fichtre, 2008
- Tu pouvais pas savoir, Grafigne.com, coll. "Cœur de loup", 2008
- Les tarifs vont augmenter, Fichtre, 2009
- S'tie qu'on est ben, story and art created with Iris, self-published, 2009
- Le quart de millimètre, éditions Grafigne.com, 2009, ISBN 978-2-923575-36-0
- Le Mat, Colosse, 2009, ISBN 978-2-923664-14-9
- Apnée, éditions Pow Pow, 2010, ISBN 978-2-9811128-7-3
- Amsterdam, Grafigne.com, coll. "Cœur de loup", 2010
- Ça s'est passé en 2006 dans un autobus de Longueuil, Colosse, 2010
- Le bestiaire des fruits, self-published, 2011
- L'ostie d'chat, story and art created with Iris, Delcourt, coll. "Shampoing"
  - Tome 1, 2011
  - Tome 2, 2012
  - Tome 3, 2012
- Pain de viande avec dissonances, éditions Pow Pow, 2011, ISBN 978-2-924049-00-6
- L'ostie d'chat : les bonus, with Iris, 2012 (?), 88 p.
- Stie qu'on est pas ben, story and art created with Sophie Bédard, self-published, 2012
- Les deuxièmes, éditions Pow Pow, 2013, 132 p., ISBN 978-2-924049-06-8
- Le son de la pluie, self-published, 2013
- Le bestiaire des fruits (enlarged and partly redrawn edition), La Pastèque, collection "Pomélo", 2014, 124 p., ISBN 978-2-923841-54-0
- Ping-pong, self-published, 2014, 152 p., ISBN 978-2-924054-05-5
- For as long as it rains, Pow Pow Press, 2015 (the translation in English of Les deuxièmes)
- Club sandwich, éditions Pow Pow, 2016 ISBN 978-2-924049-31-0
- La Jungle, comics magazine launched by Zviane in 2016, self-published, biannual
  - No 1, October, 2016, 88 p., ISBN 978-2-924054-07-9
  - No 2, La Mer, April, 2017

=== In collective works ===
- "Mauve Ciel", in Histoires d'hiver, collective by the winners of the Hachette Canada bande dessinée contest 2009, Glénat Québec, 2009 ISBN 978-2-923621-15-9
- "Bagarre (ou étirer un élastique II)", in Bagarre, collective, Colosse, 2009
- "Esquive" in Partie de pêche, collective by the winners of the Hachette Canada bande dessinée contest 2010, Glénat Québec, 2010 ISBN 978-2-7619-2974-5
- "Dans mon corps" in Zik & BD, Éditions de l'Homme, 2010 ISBN 978-2-923621-29-6
- "Devenir grand", with Luc Bossé, in Partie de pêche, collective by the winners of the Hachette Canada bande dessinée contest 2011, Glénat Québec, 2011
- Ping-pong, edition commented by other authors, éditions Pow Pow, 2015, 236 p., ISBN 978-2-924049-24-2

=== Other ===
- La leçon de classique, with Julien Cayer as writer, a monthly webcomic about classical music, on the website of Espace musique, the music channel of the Société Radio-Canada, 2008
- Zviane collaborated with a professor of music at Université de Montréal to make L'œil qui entend, l'oreille qui voit: A model of analysis for the tonal harmonic discourse, an online book about music, using comics, versions in French and in English.

== Awards and nominations ==
=== Awards ===
- Winner of the first Concours québécois de bande dessinée
- First Prize Glénat Québec 2009 for Mauve ciel
- First Prize Glénat Québec 2010 for Esquive
- Fifth Prize Glénat Québec 2011 for Devenir grand, with Luc Bossé
- Bédélys Prize for an independent work 2011 for Le bestiaire des fruits
- Grand prix de la Ville de Québec 2011 (prix Bédéis causa) for Apnée
- Grand prix de la Ville de Québec 2014 (prix Bédéis causa) for Les deuxièmes
- Winner of the Joe Shuster Award for Cartoonist 2014 for Les deuxièmes

=== Nominations ===
- Prix Bédélys Québec, 2007 for La plus jolie fin du monde
- Prix Bédélys fanzine 2008 for Tu pouvais pas savoir
- Prix Bédélys Québec 2010 for Le quart de millimètre
- Prix Bédélys fanzine 2010 for S'tie qu'on est ben
- Prix Bédélys Québec 2011 for Apnée
- Joe Shuster Award for Cover Artist 2011 for Apnée
- Prix Bédélys independent 2014 for Le son de la pluie
