= Margaret Buffie =

Canadian young adult fiction writer

- Born: Winnipeg, Manitoba, Canada
- Education: University of Manitoba
- Occupation: Author
- Spouse: James Macfarlane
- Writing career
- Genre: Young Adult Literature

Margaret Buffie is a Canadian young adult fiction writer.

Buffie was born in Winnipeg, Manitoba. She attended Sparling Elementary School, Sargeant Park Junior High, and Daniel McIntyre High School. Buffie has a Bachelor of Fine Arts from the University of Manitoba.

She worked as a visual artist before beginning a writing career in 1985. Her first manuscript, a novel entitled Who is Frances Rain? (1987), was published by Kids Can Press in Toronto. This story about a girl who has antique glasses which allow her to see ghosts is considered a "Canadian classic." Her latest novel, Winter Shadows, was published on October 12, 2010, by Tundra Books, a division of Penguin Random House.

Buffie is a recipient of the Vicky Metcalf Award Body of Work Award (For Writing Inspirational to Canadian Youth). She is also a recipient of the Young Adult Canadian Book Award; is a two-time winner of the McNally Robinson Book for Young People award and shortlisted for the Governor Generals Award, as well as being shortlisted for many other awards and honours.

She is married to James Macfarlane and they have one daughter, Christine.

== Bibliography ==
- Who is Frances Rain? (1987) Kids Can Press. US Title; The Haunting of Frances Rain, Scholastic Publishing: winner of the Young Adult Canadian Book Award - The Canadian Library Association
- The Warnings (1989), original title; The Guardian Circle, Kids Can Press, Canada International Youth Library Notable Book
- My Mother's Ghost (1992) Kids Can Press; nominated for a Governor General's Award
- The Dark Garden (1995) Kids Can Press; winner of the McNally Robinson Book for Young People
- Angels Turn Their Backs (1998) Kids Can Press; New York Public Library Books for the Teenager, 1999
- The Watcher (2000) Kids Can Press; shortlisted: Young Adult Canadian Book Award (Canadian Library Association)
- The Seeker (2002) Kids Can Press; Voya's 18th Annual List of the Best in Science Fiction and Fantasy for the Young Adult Reader, 2003
- The Finder (2004) Kids Can Press; winner of The McNally Robinson Book for Young People Award
- Out of Focus (2006) Kids Can Press;Top Ten Canadian Books for Young Adults, Ontario Library Association
- Winter Shadows (2010) Tundra; Penguin Random House; Winner of the Silver Nautilus Award, (USA); nominated for the Canadian Library Assoc Book of the Year Award
