= Don Dickinson =

Canadian writer (born 1947)

- Born: December 27, 1947 (age 78); Prince Albert, Saskatchewan, Canada
- Occupations: short story writer, novelist
- Spouse: Chellie Margaret Eaton m. 1 May 1970 - present (3 children)
- Writing career
- Period: 1980s–present
- Notable works: Blue Husbands, The Crew, Robbiestime, Fighting the Upstream

Don Dickinson (born December 27, 1947) is a Canadian writer and former actor, born in Prince Albert, Saskatchewan. He was a shortlisted nominee for the Governor General's Award for English-language fiction at the 1991 Governor General's Awards for his short story collection Blue Husbands, and for the 1993 Books in Canada First Novel Award for his novel The Crew. Blue Husbands was also a winner of the Ethel Wilson Fiction Prize in 1992.

Dickinson has published one other short story collection and three novels. A graduate of the University of Saskatchewan and the University of British Columbia, he worked primarily as a school teacher in Lillooet, British Columbia. He served on the jury for the Governor General's Awards in 1996.

== Works ==
- Fighting the Upstream (1987)
- Blue Husbands (1991)
- The Crew (1993)
- Robbiestime (2000)
- Rag and Bone Man (2019)
