= Melissa Mollen Dupuis =

Innu filmmaker, radio host, and activist

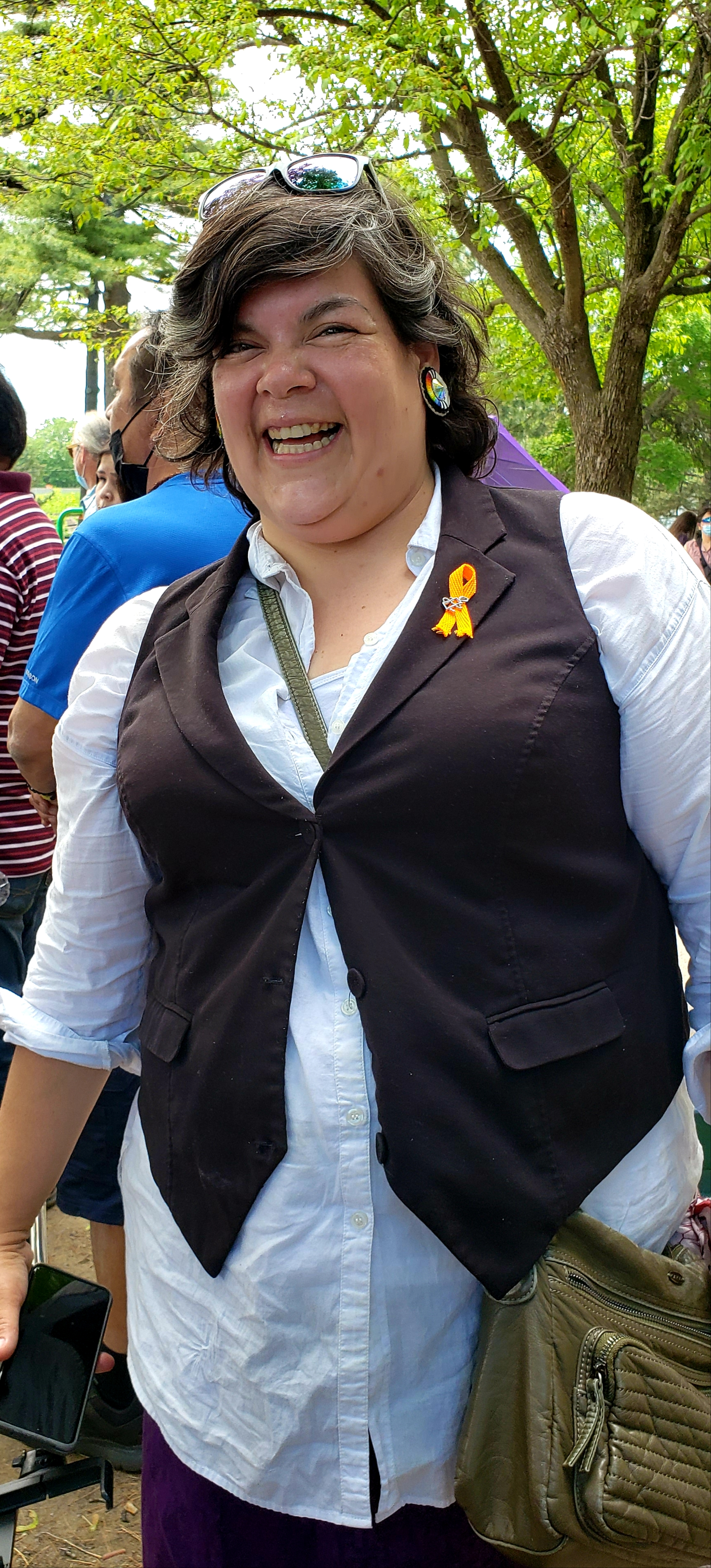
- Mollen Dupuis in 2021
- Born: Ekuanitshit, Quebec, Canada
- Occupations: Film director; radio personality; activist
- Known for: Indigenous rights activism
- Movement: Idle No More

Melissa Mollen Dupuis is an Innu film director, radio host, and Indigenous rights activist from Ekuanitshit, Quebec, Canada. Mollen Dupuis is a prominent figure in the Indigenous rights movement in Quebec, particularly as a co-founder of the province's branch of Idle No More. She has hosted the radio show Kuei! Kwe! on Ici Radio-Canada Première since 2021.

== Early life ==
Mollen Dupuis was born in Ekuanitshit, an Innu reserve in the Côte-Nord region of Quebec, Canada.

== Activism ==
Mollen Dupuis and fellow Indigenous rights activist Widia Larivière founded the Quebec branch of the Idle No More movement in 2012. Since that time, both Mollen Dupuis and Larivière have been spokespersons for the movement in Quebec. Mollen Dupuis was inspired by the actions of Mohawk land defenders like Ellen Gabriel and Kahentiiosta to become involved in Idle No More.

In 2017, Amnesty International's Ambassador of Conscience Award was awarded to Canada's Indigenous rights movement. Mollen Dupuis and Larivière received the award on behalf of Quebec's Idle No More.

Mollen Dupuis currently serves as the head of the David Suzuki Foundation's Forest Campaign.

== Career ==
In 2014, Mollen Dupuis was appointed chair of the Board of Directors of Wapikoni Mobile, an organization dedicated to Indigenous cinema. Since 2021, she has hosted the radio show Kuei! Kwe! on Ici Radio-Canada Première.

In a collaboration with writer and illustrator Elise Gravel, Mollen Dupuis published Nutshimit: Un bain de forêt (Nutshimit: In the Forest), a non-fiction book for young readers, in 2023. Nutshimit, which explores Innu culture through Mollen Dupuis's first-person narrative and Gravel's illustrations, earned Mollen Dupuis and Gravel the 2024 Ruth and Sylvia Schwartz Award in the Children's Picture Book category.

Mollen Dupuis has a podcast, Parole Autochtone, on which "she speaks on a multitude of subjects about the daily life of First Nations, Métis and Inuit people [sic] in Canada."

== Publications ==
- Mollen Dupuis, Melissa (2020). "Memekueshu". In Michel, Jean (ed.). Amun: A Gathering of Indigenous Stories. Holstein, Ontario: Exile Editions. ISBN 9781550968774.
- ——— (2023). Nutshimit: Un bain de forêt [Nutshimit: In the Forest] (in French). Illustrated by Elise Gravel. Toronto: Scholastic. ISBN 978-1-0397-0142-7.

== Filmography ==
Mollen Dupuis has directed several short films focused on the realities of Indigenous lives.

- O (2012)
- Femmes autochtones disparues et assassinées (2012; "Missing and Murdered Indigenous Women")
- Nanapush et la tortue (2013; "Nanapush and the Turtle")
- Nitanish – À ma fille (2015; "Nitanish – To My Daughter")
- Respecter la roue (2016; "Respect the Wheel")

== See also ==
- Michèle Audette – Canadian Innu politician and activist
- Cindy Blackstock – Canadian Gitxsan activist
