= Lake Sagaris =

Canadian writer and urban planner

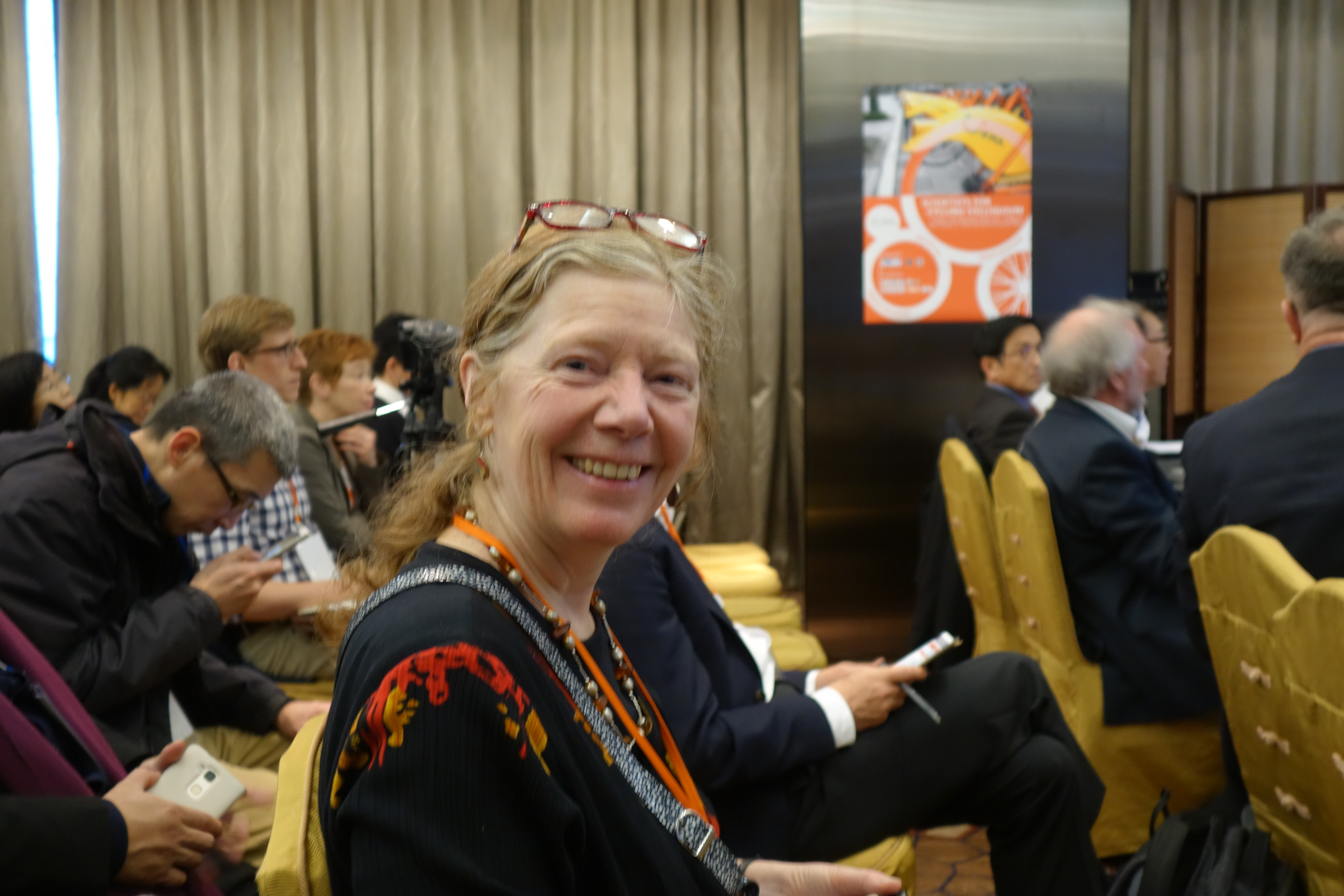
Lake Sagaris pictured at European Cyclist Federation event

Lake Sagaris (born 1956 in Montreal, Quebec) is a Canadian-Chilean journalist, poet, writer, urban planner, translator, and community leader.

When she was elected a leader into the Bellavista neighborhood association in the 1990s she became active in neighborhood issues. Sagaris achieved a Master of Science in 2006 and got her PhD in Urban Planning and Community Development in 2012 both at the University of Toronto.

Her book After the First Death: A Journey Through Chile, Time, Mind was a non-fiction finalist for the 1996 Governor General's Awards for Literary Merit. She won first prize in the Periodical Writers Association of Canada Magazine and Newspaper Travel Writing Contest 1997 for her article "Norte Grande."

== Books ==
- Sagaris, Lake. Bone and dream : into the world's driest desert. 1st ed. -- Toronto : A.A. Knopf Canada, c2000. ISBN 0-676-97223-3 (about the Atacama Desert in Chile)
- Sagaris, Lake. After the first death : a journey through Chile, time, mind. Toronto : Somerville House Publishing, c1996. xxviii, 401 p., [8] p. of plates : ill., maps, ports.; 24 cm. ISBN 1-895897-63-7
- Sagaris, Lake. Medusa's children : a journey from Newfoundland to Chiloé. Regina : Coteau Books, c1993. 142 p. : map; 23 cm. ISBN 1-55050-046-5
- Sagaris, Lake. Exile home = Exilio en la patria. [Dunvegan, Ont.] : Cormorant Books, Casa Canadá, c1986. 104 p.; 23 cm. Poems in English and Spanish. ISBN 0-920953-04-2
