= Charlotte Gingras =

Canadian author living in Quebec (born 1943)

Charlotte Gingras (born December 10, 1943) is a Canadian author living in Quebec.

She was born in Quebec City and studied teaching and the plastic arts. Gingras taught primary school, gave workshops on creativity for adults and did freelance work as a visual artist.

Her book La liberté? Connais pas received the 1999 Governor General's Award for French-language children's literature. She received the same award in 2000 for Un été de Jade. In 2004, she received a Mr. Christie's Book Award for La boîte à bonheur. Her book Guerres was awarded the Prix Alvine-Bélisle in 2012. Some of her books have been translated into English by Susan Ouriou and into German by Rosemarie Griebel-Kruip.

== Selected works ==
- Les Chats d'Aurélie (1994)
- L'Ile au géant (1995)
- Les sorts (1999)
- La liberté? Connais pas (1999)
- La boîte à bonheur (2005)
- Ophélie (2008)
