= Dorothy Howard =

American folklorist

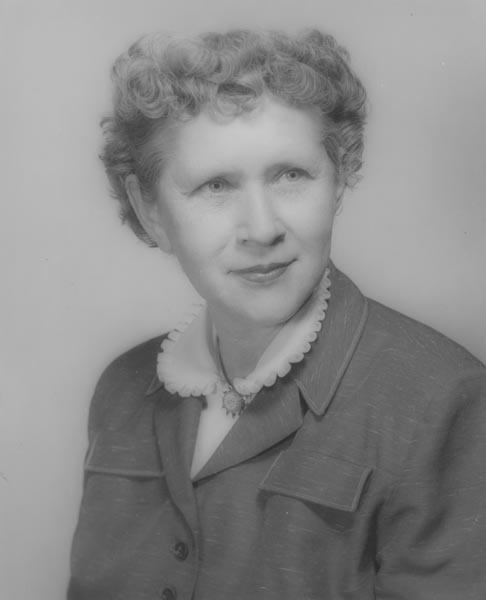
- Dorothy Howard, Studio Portrait, circa 1950
- Born: July 1902; Texas, U.S.
- Died: 1996; Massachusetts, U.S.

Academic background
- Education: North Texas State Teacher's College; New York University

Dorothy Howard was an American folklorist, public school teacher, principal, and professor at Frostburg State University. Howard was an early proponent of folklore in education and a pioneer in the field of children's folklore. The American Folklore Society's Folklore and Education Prize is named after her.

== Personal life ==
Howard was born Dorothy Gray Mills in July 1902, in Texas. She married James Howard in 1925, and the couple had two children. After her retirement, Howard lived in Roswell, New Mexico, from 1969. Eventually, due to failing health, Howard moved to Greenfield, Massachusetts, where she died in 1996 at the age of ninety-three.

== Education ==
Howard graduated from North Texas State Teacher's College (now known as the University of North Texas) with a B.S. in education in 1923.

In 1938, Howard earned her doctorate in education from New York University. Her dissertation was titled, “Folk Jingles of American Children: A Collection and Study of Rhymes Used by Children Today.”

== Career ==
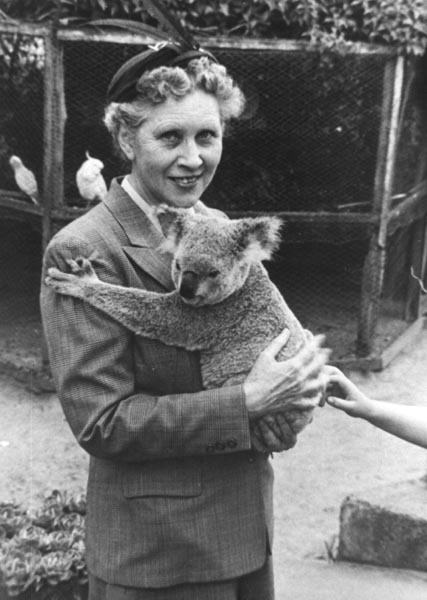
Dorothy Howard holding a koala, during her Australian tour, 1954

Howard began her career as a schoolteacher in 1920 at the age of seventeen when she took over for a fourth grade teacher who died suddenly in a nearby community. Following her graduation from North Texas State Teacher's College in 1923, she worked as a teacher, and eventually principal, in public schools in Texas, New York, and New Jersey until 1944.

In 1944, Howard became a professor at Frostburg State University in the English department. She would continue in that role until 1967. She spent the next two years, from 1967 until 1969 as a visiting professor of English at the University of Nebraska.

For 10 months in 1954–1955, Howard documented the play of Australian children as part of a postdoctoral Fulbright Fellowship. She was the first person to ever undertake such documentation of Australian children's folklore in a systematic way.

Howard's work focused on the play of children, including playground songs, chants, rhymes, and even insults, and she is one of, if not the, first person to earn a Ph.D. for the study of children's "folk jingles," as Howard called them. For her work with children's folklore and her use of folklore in education, she has been described as a pioneer in the field by scholars and scholarly organizations, including the American Folklore Society and The Anthropological Association for the Study of Play. Her Australian research collection was eventually donated to Museum Victoria in 2000.

== Awards and honors ==
- 1954–1955: Fulbright Fellow
- 1981: American Philosophy Fellowship
- 1990: Lifetime Achievement Award from the Children's Folklore Section of the American Folklore Society

== Works ==
Howard published extensively, including articles for the general public such as a piece in The New Yorker, as well as many book chapters, peer-reviewed articles in journals such as The Journal of American Folklore and Western Folklore, book reviews, poetry, and book-length manuscripts:

- Ramsey, Eloise; Howard, Dorothy (1952). Folklore for Children and Young People: a Critical and Descriptive Bibliography for Use in the Elementary and Intermediate School. Philadelphia: American Folklore Society Bibliographical Series.
- Howard, Dorothy (1977). Dorothy's World: Childhood in Sabine Bottom, 1902-1910. Simon & Schuster. ISBN 978-0132186025.
- Howard, Dorothy (1989). Pedro of Tonalá. Hall-Poorbaugh Press.
