= François Blais (writer) =

Canadian writer (1973 – 2022)

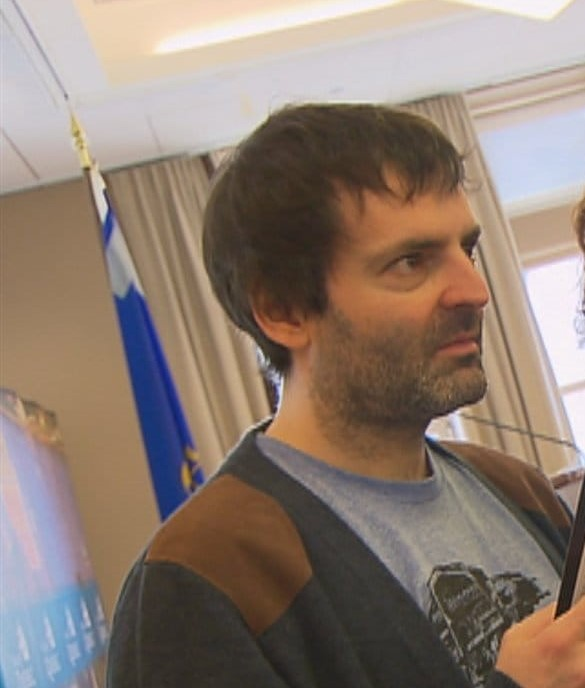
- Born: January 3, 1973; Grand-Mère, Quebec, Canada
- Died: May 14, 2022 (aged 49); Charette, Quebec, Canada
- Occupation: Writer
- Notable work: Lac Adélard
- Awards: Governor General’s Literary Award

François Blais (January 3, 1973 – May 14, 2022) was a Canadian writer from Quebec who received the 2020 Governor General's Award for French-language children's literature for his novel Lac Adélard.

== Biography ==
François Blais was born in 1973 in the small town of Grand-Mère in the Mauricie region of Quebec. He grew up in a house with a library filled with titles like Tintin, Bob Morane, and books from the Countess of Ségur.

He published his first novel, Iphigénie en Haute-Ville at the age of 32 in 2006, which quickly became a finalist for several literary prizes, namely the Prix des libraires du Québec, the Prix France-Québec and the Prix Senghor de la création littéraire. Although he had until then worked primarily as a translator, Blais published a book almost every year, and beginning in 2016, had alternated between adult and children's books all while being employed as a night custodian for a shopping centre in Trois-Rivières.

Blais was also particularly stingy with biographical details in the rare interviews he did grant. His work was first translated in 2018, when his novel Document 1 appeared in English under the same title.

He lived in Quebec City and, in 2016, moved to a farm in the village of Charette in the county of Maskinongé in Quebec to live with his sister. Blais died there on May 14, 2022, from suicide at the age of 49.

On December 16, 2022, the Quebec Ministry of Health and Social Services issued a warning about his novel The Boy with Upside-Down Feet, claiming that the book could incite young readers to suicide. There was a swift and negative public reaction to the warning from the media and the literary and medical communities.

== Works ==
Blais' novels contain autobiographical elements, which are often rooted in his hometown of Grand-Mère in Quebec. Since his works are initially characterized by quirky and scathing humour, he never resorted to autofiction.

His sixth novel, La classe de Madame Valérie, which traces the life of a group of 11-year-old classmates at Laflèche school in Grand-Mère, Quebec, was published in 2013, and received praise from many, and in particular from veteran Quebec journalist Pierre Foglia.

Un livre sur Mélanie Cabay, inspired by the 1994 disappearance and death of a young woman was published in 2018. In 2020, his novel Lac Adélard, won the Governor General's Award for French-language children's literature at the 2020 Governor General's Awards.

His 2012 novel Document 1 was published in English in 2018 by Book*hug in a translation by JC Sutcliffe, under the same title. It was the first of his works to be translated in another language.

Blais' last novel, La seule chose qui intéresse tout le monde offered a dark reflection on artificial intelligence and human desires. The book touches on the topic of suicide and sentience which is notable since the author committed suicide shortly after finishing the manuscript.

=== Novels and short stories ===
- 2006 – Iphigénie en Haute-Ville (L’instant même) ISBN 9782895022824
- 2007 – Nous autres ça compte pas (L’instant même) ISBN 9782895022473
- 2008 – Le Vengeur masqué contre les hommes-perchaude de la lune (L’instant même) ISBN 9782896471416
- 2009 – Vie d’Anne-Sophie Bonenfant (L’instant même) ISBN 9782895022862
- 2011 – La nuit des morts-vivants (L’instant même) ISBN 9782895023074
- 2012 – Document 1 (L’instant même) ISBN 9782895023197
- 2013 – La classe de madame Valérie (L’instant même) ISBN 9782895023357
- 2014 – Sam (L’instant même) ISBN 9782895023456
- 2015 – Cataonie (short stories) (L’instant même) ISBN 9782895023609
- 2017 – Les Rivières, suivi de Les Montagnes : Deux histoires de fantômes (short stories) (L’instant même) ISBN 9782895023906
- 2018 – Un livre sur Mélanie Cabay (L’instant même) ISBN 9782895024064
- 2021 – La seule chose qui intéresse tout le monde (L'instant même) ISBN 9782895024521

=== Children's books ===
- 2016 – 752 lapins (400 coups) ISBN 9782895406853
- 2017 – Le livre où la poule meurt à la fin (400 coups) ISBN 9782895406976
- 2019 – Lac Adélard, illustrated by Iris Boudreau (La courte échelle) ISBN 9782897742249
- 2020 – L’Horoscope (400 coups) ISBN 9782895408659

=== Collaborations ===
- 2015 – "Nous avons un problème", collection of short stories Il n’y a que les fous (L’instant même) ISBN 9782895028833, 2895028834

== Awards and honours ==
- Governor General's Award for French-language children's literature, laureate in 2020 for Lac Adélard, illustrated by Iris Boudreau (La courte échelle)
- Prix jeunesse des libraires du Québec, laureate 2021 in the 12–17 years old category for Lac Adélard, illustrated by Iris Boudreau
- Prix jeunesse des libraires, co-laureate in 2019 in the 6–11 years old category with Valérie Boivin for Le livre où la poule meurt à la fin (Les 400 coups)
- Prix des libraires, finalist in 2014 for his novel La classe de madame Valérie (L’instant même)
- Prix de création littéraire de la Bibliothèque de Québec-Salon international du livre de Québec, laureate in 2013 for his novel Document 1
- Prix des libraires, finalist in 2013 for his novel Document 1 (L’instant même)
- Prix des libraires, finalist in 2007 for his novel Iphigénie en Haute-Ville (L’instant même)
