= Judith Fitzgerald =

Canadian poet and journalist

Judith Ariana Fitzgerald (11 November 1952 – 25 November 2015) was a Canadian poet and journalist. Born in Toronto, Ontario, she attended York University (where she earned her BA and MA; she did her doctoral work at the University of Toronto). She authored over twenty books of poetry, as well as biographies of musician Sarah McLachlan and Marshall McLuhan. She died in her home in Northern Ontario, at the age of 63.

== Bibliography ==
=== Poetry ===
- 1970: Octave. Toronto: Dreadnaught
- 1972: City Park. Agincourt, ON: Northern Concept
- 1975: Journal Entries. Toronto: Dreadnaught Press
- 1975: Victory. Toronto: Coach House Press
- 1977: Lacerating Heartwood. Toronto: Coach House Press
- 1981: Easy Over. Windsor: Black Moss Press
- 1983: Split/Levels. Toronto: Coach House Press
- 1984: The Syntax of Things. Toronto: Prototype
- 1983: Heart Attack[s]. Canada: privately published
- 1984: Beneath the Skin of Paradise: The Piaf Poems. Windsor: Black Moss Press
- 1985: My Orange Gorange. Windsor: Black Moss Press
- 1985: Given Names: New and Selected Poems 1972–1985. Ed. Frank Davey. Windsor: Black Moss Press
- 1986: Whale Waddleby. Windsor: Black Moss Press
- 1987: Diary of Desire. Windsor, ON: Black Moss Press
- 1991: Rapturous Chronicles. Stratford, ON: Mercury Press
- 1992: Ultimate Midnight. Windsor, ON: Black Moss Press
- 1992: Habit of Blues: Rapturous Chronicles II. Stratford, ON: Mercury Press, 1993
- 1993: walkin' wounded. Windsor, ON: Black Moss Press
- 1995: River. Toronto: ECW Press
- 1999: 26 Ways Out of This World. Ottawa: Oberon
- 2003: Iphigenia's Song (Adagios Quartet vol. 1). Ottawa: Oberon Press
- 2004: Orestes' Lament (Adagios Quartet vol. 2). Ottawa: Oberon Press
- 2006: Electra's Benison (Adagios Quartet vol. 3). Ottawa: Oberon Press
- 2007: O, Clytaemnestra! (Adagios Quartet vol. 4). Ottawa: Oberon Press
- 2015: Impeccable Regret. Vancouver: Talonbooks

=== Prose ===
- 1997: Building A Mystery: The Story of Sarah McLachlan and Lilith Fair. Kingston, ON: Quarry Music Books
- 2000: Sarah McLachlan: Building a Mystery. Kingston, ON: Quarry Music Books, Millennial Edition
- 2001: Marshall McLuhan: Wise Guy. Montreal: XYZ

=== Edited ===
- 1982: Un Dozen: Thirteen Canadian Poets. Windsor, ON: Black Moss
- 1986: SP/ELLES: Poetry by Canadian Women. Windsor, ON: Black Moss Press
- 1988: First Person Plural. Windsor, ON: Black Moss Press
- 2000: Bagne, or, Criteria for Heaven, by Rob Mclennan. Fredericton, NB: Broken Jaw Press

Except where noted, bibliographic information courtesy Brock University.
