= Anne Élaine Cliche =

Canadian writer (born 1959)

Anne Élaine Cliche (born May 20, 1959) is a Canadian writer living in Montreal, Quebec.

== Biography ==
She was born in Val-d'Or and was educated there. She went on to study music (piano) at the École de musique Vincent d'Indy in Montreal. She continued her studies at the University of Ottawa, receiving a bachelor's degree in music, then a bachelor's and master's degree in French literature and a doctorate in French and Quebec literature. She taught in the French literature department at the University of Ottawa and then was an associate professor at the University of Toronto. Since 1992, she has been a professor in the literary studies department at the Université du Québec à Montréal. Cliche has received several grants from the Social Sciences and Humanities Research Council, as well as a John Charles Polanyi Prize.

Her first novel La Pisseuse, published in 1993, received the Grand prix du livre de Montréal. Her essay Dire le livre. Écrivains, lecteurs, talmudistes, psychanalystes et autres curiosités was a finalist for a Governor General's Literary Award. Her 2009 novel Mon frère Ésaü was a finalist for the Prix Ringuet. Jonas de mémoire, a novel published in 2014, was a finalist for the Grand prix du livre de Montréal.

== Selected works ==
- La sainte famille, novel (1994)
- Rien et autres souvenirs, novel (1998)
- Poétiques du Messie. L'origine juive en souffrance, non-fiction (2007), was a finalist for the Prix J.I. Segal awarded by the Jewish Public Library
