= Sylvie Desrosiers =

Canadian writer living in Quebec

Sylvie Desrosiers (born August 28, 1954) is a Canadian writer living in Quebec.

She was born in Montreal and received a BA in visual arts from the Université de Montréal. Desrosiers contributed to the Quebec humour magazine Croc. In 1987, she published La patte dans le sac which became the first of 18 novels in the Notdog series.

Alongside Sylvie Pilon, Desrosiers wrote the script for the film Red Nose (Nez rouge). Also, she was the scriptwriter for the 2006 film Duo.

Desrosiers lives in Longueuil.

== Selected works ==
Sources:

- Le long silence (1996), finalist for a Governor General's literary Award
- Bonne nuit, bon rêves, pas de puces, pas de punaises, novel (1998)
- Jeu de l'oie. Petite histoire vraie d'une cancer, autobiographical (2003)
- L'Héritage de la pirate, teen novel (2005)
- Les trois lieues, teen fiction (2008), received the Governor General's Award for French-language children's literature
