= Benoît Melançon =

Canadian writer and academic

Benoît Melançon (born September 20, 1958) is a Québécois writer and academic. He was the director of the Department of French Literature at the Université de Montréal and the scientific director of the Presses de l'Université de Montréal. He is a Fellow of the Royal Society of Canada.

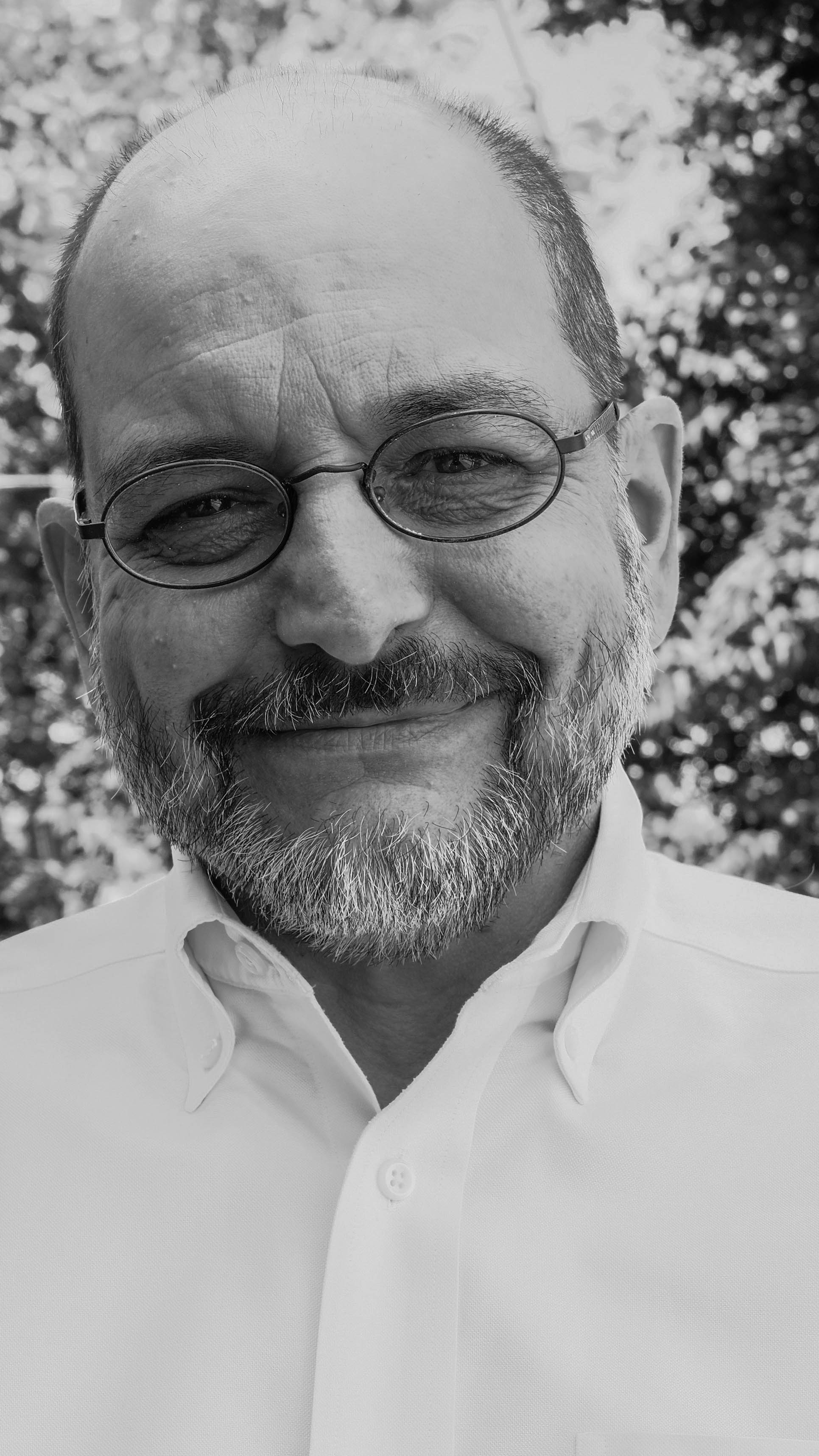
Benoît Melançon in 2017.

A specialist in 18th-century French literature, Melançon has also written about Québécois cultural history and linguistics. Since May 1992, he has published an electronic bibliography of 18th-century literature; it currently is on its 550th issue and contains over 64,000 titles.

His monograph "The Rocket: A Cultural History of Maurice Richard" was met with critical acclaim, winning the Prix du Québec, and was recognized by La Presse as "one of the five best Québécois essays of the 2000s."

In August 2024, he was named Professor Emeritus at the Université de Montréal.
