= Mark Cheetham =

Canadian art history professor

Mark Arthur Cheetham (born 1954) is professor in the department of Art History at the University of Toronto. Cheetham is a specialist in writing about art in modern and contemporary art.

== Selected publications ==
- Theory Between the Disciplines: Authority Vision Politics. Coeditor with Martin Kreiswirth. Ann Arbor: University of Michigan Press, 1990.
- Remembering Postmodernism: Trends in Recent Canadian Art. Oxford and Toronto: Oxford University Press, 1991. Second, revised ed. OUP, 2012.
- The Rhetoric of Purity: Essentialist Theory and the Advent of Abstract Painting. Cambridge: Cambridge University Press (Cambridge New Art History and Criticism series, ed. Norman Bryson), 1991.
- La Mémoire Postmoderne: Essai sur l’art canadien postmoderne. Trans. Jean Papineau. Montréal: Liber, 1992. (This is a French ed. of Remembering Postmodernism, cited below. Recipient of the Prix littéraire du Gouverneur général, catégorie traduction, 1992)
- Alex Colville: The Observer Observed. Toronto: ECW Press, 1994. (2nd ed., 1995).
- The Subjects of Art History: Historical Objects in Contemporary Perspective. Coeditor with Michael Ann Holly and Keith Moxey, Cambridge University Press, 1998. (Korean translation, Seoul: Kyungsung University Press, 2007)
- Kant, Art, and Art History: Moments of Discipline. Cambridge University Press, 2001. Chinese trans., Nanjing: Jiangsu Fine Arts Publishing House, 2010.
- Abstract Art Against Autonomy: Infection, Resistance, and Cure since the '60s. Cambridge University Press, 2006.
- Artwriting, Nation, and Cosmopolitanism in Britain: The "Englishness" of English Art Theory since the 18th Century. Ashgate: British Art: Global Contexts series. Feb. 2012.
- Jack Chambers: Life & Work. Toronto: Art Canada Institute, 2013.
- Landscape into Eco Art: Articulations of Nature since the '60s. Penn State UP, Feb. 2018.
