= Michèle Marineau =

Canadian writer and translator

Michèle Marineau (born 1955) is a Canadian writer and translator living in Quebec.

She was born in Montreal and studied medicine, the history of art and translation at the Université de Montréal. She worked for several years as a freelance editor. She published her first novel Cassiopée ou l'été polonais in 1988; it received the Governor General's Award for French-language children's literature. It has been translated into Swedish, Spanish and Catalan. Her 1992 novel La Route de Chlifa received the Prix Alvine-Bélisle, the Prix 12/17 Brive-Montréal and a Governor General's Literary Award. It was translated into English in 1995 as The Road to Chlifa, also appearing in Danish and in Dutch.

She was a finalist for the John Glassco Translation Prize and also appeared three times on the short lists for the Governor General's award for translation.

She is married to writer François Gravel, and is the stepmother of writer and illustrator Élise Gravel.

== Selected works ==
Sources:

- Sur le rivage (1991), translation from Along the shore : tales by the sea by Lucy Maud Montgomery
- Le monde merveilleux de Marigold (1991), translation from Magic for Marigold by Lucy Maud Montgomery
- La route de Chlifa (1992)
- Au-delà des ténèbres (1993), translation from Among the shadows by Lucy Maud Montgomery
- Anne-- la maison aux pignons verts (1996), condensed translation from Anne of Green Gables by Lucy Maud Montgomery
- Les vélos n'ont pas d'états d'âme (1998), translated into English as Lean Mean Machines (2000)
- Rouge poison (2000), received the Mr. Christie's Book Award
- Cendrillon (2000), retold from the version by Charles Perrault, translated into English as Cinderella (2007)
- L'affreux (2000), based on a First Nations legend
- Marion et le nouveau monde (2002), received the Prix Québec-Wallonie-Bruxelles
- Cassiopée (2002)
- Barbouillette! (2011)
