= Ginette Anfousse =

Canadian writer and illustrator

Ginette Anfousse (born May 27, 1944) is a Quebec writer and illustrator of children's books.

She was born in Montreal and was educated at the École des beaux-arts de Montréal. She also studied engraving at the Atelier Graff in Montreal and the Atelier de l'Île in Val-David. Anfousse worked as a visual designer for Radio Canada from 1968 to 1970 and for Radio Quebec from 1970 to 1975. In 1978, she founded her own design company.

Her first stories Mon Ami Pichou and La Cachette were published in 1976. She has also contributed to the magazines Perspectives, Lurelu and Livre d'ici.

Anfousse has received the Children's Literature prize from the Canada Council twice: for La Chicane and La Varicelle (1979) and Un Loup pour Rose and Une Nuit au pays des malices (1983). In 1987, she was awarded the Prix Fleury-Mesplet for her work.

Many of her books have been translated into English; some have been translated into Italian, German, Spanish and Chinese.

== Selected works ==
- La Chicane (1979), included on the Honour List of the International Board on Books for Young People in Prague
- Le Savon (1980)
- L'Hiver ou le Bonhomme Sept-heures (1980)
- Les Catastrophes de Rosalie (1987), received the Prix Québec-Wallonie-Bruxelles, finalist for the Governor General's Awards in 1987
- Rosalie s'en va-t-en guerre (1989), received the Mr. Christie's Book Award
- Un Terrible secret (1991), finalist for the Governor General's Awards in 1991
- Rosalie à la belle étoile (1998)
