= Agathe Génois =

Canadian poet and writer

Agathe Génois (born 1952) is a Canadian writer living in Quebec.

She was born in Saint-Raymond. Although she has published two collections of poetry, she decided to concentrate on youth literature in 1995.

== Selected works ==
- Sarah, je suis là! (1996), youth novel, received the Prix Libellule, was a finalist for a Governor General's Literary Award and received the emerging talent award for the Cécile-Gagnon
- Adieu, vieux lézard! (1998), youth novel, was a finalist for a Governor General's Literary Award
- À toi de jouer, Sarah ! (2000), youth novel, received a Canada Council grant
