= Cécile Gagnon =

Canadian writer and illustrator

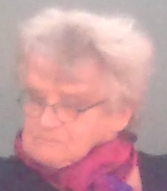
Cécile Gagnon photographed in Montreal, Quebec, Canada at the Salon du livre de Montréal 2019.

Cécile Gagnon (born January 7, 1936) is a Canadian writer and illustrator living in Quebec.

Born in Quebec City, she received a bachelor's degree in literature from the Université Laval. She went on to study graphic arts at Boston University and the École nationale supérieure des arts décoratifs in Paris, and art education at Sir George Williams University. She then pursued Italian studies at the Université de Montréal and the Scuola di Lingua e Cultura in Siena. From 1971 to 1973, she was responsible for the Safari magazine for children at Montréal-Matin. From 1977 to 1979, she was editor in chief of the "Cahiers Passe-partout" at the Quebec Ministry of Education. She contributed to various publications, including Lurelu, Cahiers de la femme, Municipalité and the IBBY Newsletter; from 1986 to 1988, she was editor in chief for Coulicou.

Gagnon has been a finalist several times for the Governor General's Awards for Literary Merit. In 2012, she received the Prix Raymond-Plante for her body of work.

At the publisher Les Éditions Héritage, she established and directed the "Brindille" collection and directed the "Libellule" collection. She was a founding member of Communication-Jeunesse and served as its president from 1977 to 1979.

In 1997, the Association canadienne d'éducation de langue française (ACELF) created the Prix Cécile-Gagnon, named in her honour.

== Selected works ==
- La pêche à l'horizon (1961), received the Prix du Grand Jury des Lettres
- Ô Canada! (1964), received the Prix du Mérite de la Foire internationale du livre de Leipzig
- Martine-aux-oiseaux (1964), received the Prix de la Province de Québec
- Alfred dans le métro (1980), received the Prix de l'ACELF
- Ascenseur d'Adrien (1986), received the Prix ACELF Raymond-Beauchemin
