= Ray Plante =

American politician

Member of the New Hampshire House of Representatives from the Merrimack 27th district
- Incumbent
- Assumed office December 4, 2024
- Preceded by: J.R. Hoell

Personal details
- Party: Republican

Raymond (Ray) Plante is an American politician. He serves as a Republican member for the Merrimack 27th of the New Hampshire House of Representatives.
