= Montreal World Film Festival =

Defunct annual film festival formerly held in Montreal, Canada

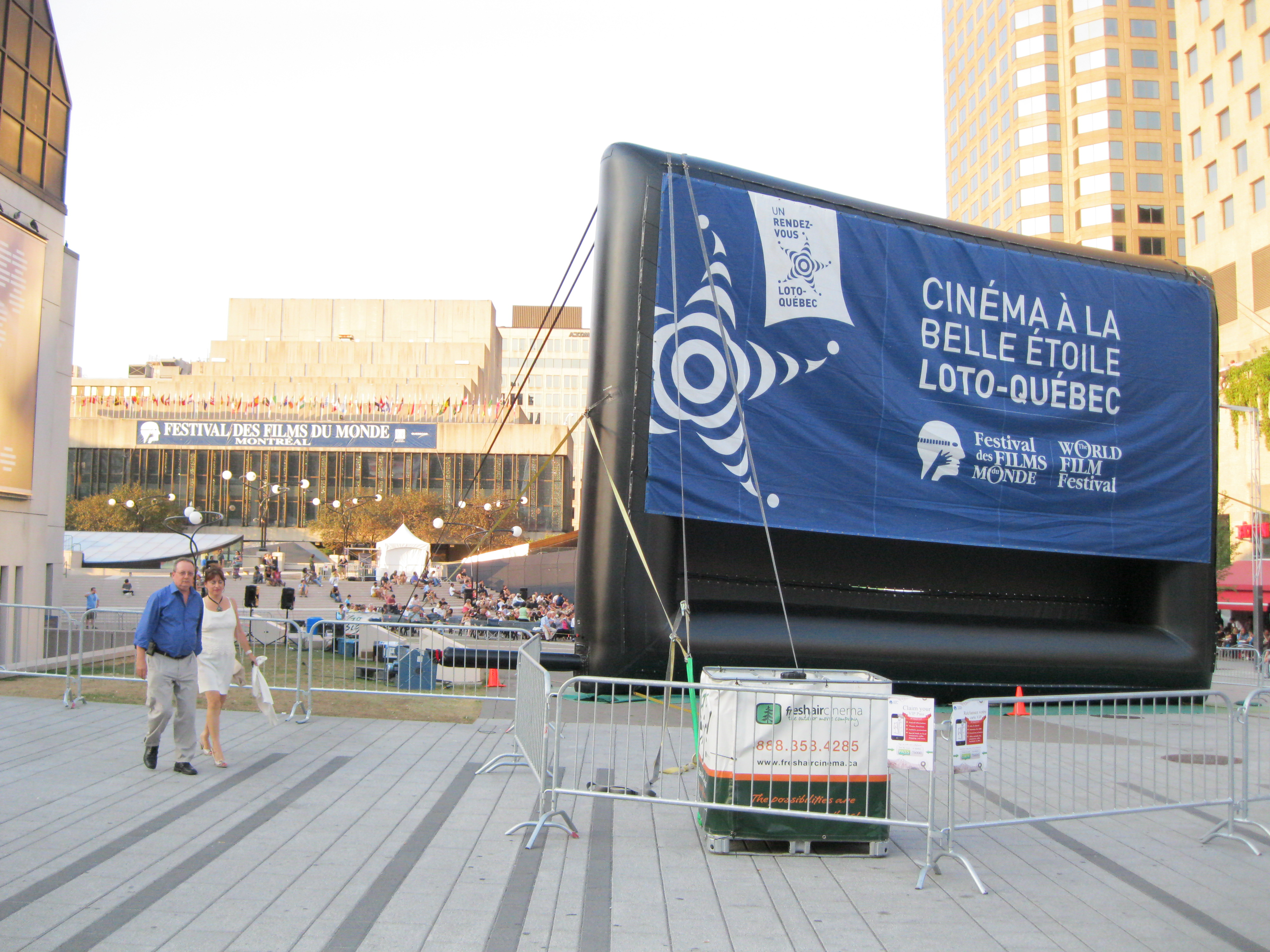
- World Film Festival, Place des Arts, Montreal
- Location: Montreal, Quebec, Canada
- Founded: 1977
- Founded by: Serge Losique
- Disestablished: 2018
- Hosted by: Montreal World Film Festival Group
- Language: International

The Montreal World Film Festival (French: Festival des films du monde de Montréal), commonly abbreviated MWFF in English or FFM in French, was an annual film festival in Montreal, Quebec, Canada from 1977 to 2019. Founded and run throughout its lifetime by Serge Losique, it was the first competitive film festival in North America accredited by the FIAPF. (Note: The Toronto International Film Festival is also FIAPF-accredited, but is run as a non-competitive event.)

The public festival, which was founded in 1977 as a replacement for the defunct Montreal International Film Festival (1960–68), was held annually in late August. Unlike the Toronto International Film Festival, which has a greater focus on Canadian and other North American films, the Montreal World Film Festival had a larger diversity of films from all over the world.

Throughout its life, the festival saw various controversies around Losique's leadership, including uneven programming, a marketing strategy that sometimes seemed more concerned with throwing barbs at the Toronto International Film Festival than with actually building the MWFF's brand, and increasing financial irregularities.

The festival was abruptly cancelled in 2019, just a few weeks before that year's event had been scheduled to launch.

== History ==
Losique launched the festival in part as a response to the inaugural 1976 Festival of Festivals, as he reportedly believed that Montreal was a more appropriate location than Toronto to be the host of a prestige film festival. After screening an inaugural program in summer 1977, he pursued the FIAPF accreditation, which was secured in early 1978. The 1978 event, however, saw the first instance of Losique using his position to take a public swipe at the Toronto festival, when he sent four films that had been booked to appear at both festivals back to their distributors after their Montreal screenings instead of forwarding the prints to Toronto as directed.

As early as 1980, the festival was marketing itself as one that was focused more on the films than their stars, with Losique regularly trumpeting that motto through the years as the thing that made his festival better than Toronto's.

By 1985, Losique was already beginning to attract criticism for running the festival in an "authoritarian" and "Napoleonic" manner, with programming driven disproportionately by his own personal taste in film rather than consideration for what would appeal to the general public. Through the 1980s, the Montreal and Toronto film festivals were typically seen as different but complementary events, although Losique continued to lash out at any media suggestion that the events were comparable in prestige or quality, and his most consistent public relations strategy in this era was to release public statements criticizing TIFF's public relations statements for being insufficiently deferential to his festival's superiority.

By the 1990s, however, the MWFF was clearly losing prestige as TIFF gained in international clout; even within Montreal, its prominence was being increasingly challenged by the Festival du nouveau cinéma, which although older than the MWFF had previously been much smaller until gaining momentum in the early 1990s. In 1991, for the first time, newspapers in Montreal began running front-page stories calling for Losique to step down and hand over leadership of the festival to a successor due to poor programming decisions and declining attendance.

In 1998, the festival faced heavy criticism when it opted to present a lifetime achievement award to Sandra Bullock, despite her still having been known only for a few hit films over the past couple of years at that point, rather than the sort of sustained career typically required to earn lifetime achievement honours. This was perceived as undermining Losique's longtime assertion that his event was film-driven instead of star-driven while TIFF was the other way around.

By 2000, even filmmakers from Quebec were frequently bypassing MWFF, instead opting to "stampede down the 401" to TIFF due to its much higher international profile before screening in Montreal at the FNC or the Rendez-vous du cinéma québécois instead of the MWFF.

The WFF lost the sponsorship of its previous government cultural funders, SODEC and Telefilm Canada as a result of disagreements with Losique in 2004, after Losique refused to cooperate with a review by those agencies of Canada's major film festivals. Subsequently, these two funding agencies announced that they would support a new international film festival, called the New Montreal FilmFest (FIFM), to be managed by Spectra Entertainment and headed by Daniel Langlois.

Despite the competing festival and the loss of government funding, however, Losique continued to organize the World Film Festival, and filed lawsuits against both Telefilm and Spectra, further suing Moritz de Hadeln personally after he was announced as FIFM's artistic director. The 2005 FIFM was not successful, and the event was discontinued; as of July 2007, Losique's lawsuits were dropped, paving the way for a restoration of government funding.

In 2005, Losique first announced and later withdrew the film Karla from the festival after the principal sponsor of the festival, Air Canada, threatened to withdraw its sponsorship of the festival if that film were included. The film — about Karla Homolka, a young woman who was convicted of manslaughter and who served twelve years in prison for her part in the kidnapping, sex enslavement, rapes and murders of teenage girls, including her own sister, in a case said to involve ephebophilia — was controversial in Canada, with many calling for its boycott throughout the country.

In 2015 a group of employees claimed they were not paid. In 2016 many of the employees resigned, citing poor leadership and financial uncertainty amongst other issues. In an interview with CTV News, Montreal Gazette entertainment columnist Bill Brownstein referred to Losique as having a "Napoleonic complex" and not "playing well with the other children" resulting in government and sponsors withdrawing their funding support. He subsequently wrote in the Gazette that Losique, "who once took pride in his Napoleonic style of autocracy, has sadly morphed into a facsimile of The Simpsons' near-fossilized cartoon despot Mr. Burns. Losique appears to have run out of smoke and mirrors."

In the same year Cineplex Entertainment withdrew its support from the festival, causing it to lose the Forum Theatre as a venue. Left with only the Imperial Cinema for a venue, the festival had to cancel some of its planned screenings and proceed with a reduced lineup, although several of the city's independent theatres stepped in to help screen films at the last minute.

In 2017, power was cut at the Imperial Theatre in July, just a few weeks before the festival, due to unpaid electricity bills, with that year's festival being saved by a last-minute intervention by Pierre-Karl Péladeau and Québecor.

In 2018 the festival was accused by Revenu Québec of owing almost $500,000 in unpaid taxes, but the festival was allowed to proceed that year after Losique made an initial payment of $33,000.

By this time, Brendan Kelly of the Montreal Gazette was explicitly calling for the festival to be shut down, writing that "Way back in the early days of the festival in the late '70s and early '80s, the FFM was a happening event that could be said to be seriously rival the Toronto fest, then called the Festival of Festivals. But that hasn't been true for 30 years, and it's almost entirely Losique's fault. As long as the FFM exists, it drags down the city's film scene. Agencies and producers in other countries who don't realize Losique's fest is irrelevant send films and filmmakers, and the poor auteurs turn up to discover they're screening films in front of near-empty rooms. It also causes enormous problems for the other much more relevant film festivals in our city, notably the Festival du nouveau cinéma and Fantasia. These festivals have not been given the chance to step up and become the city's première festival with Losique's event staggering from edition to edition."

In 2019, the WFF announced that it was cancelling the 43rd edition of the event. The stated reason was that Losique was suffering from extreme fatigue, with the festival intended at that time to return in 2020; however, with the COVID-19 pandemic emerging over the winter, the festival's return in 2020 was not possible, and the festival subsequently failed to see a revival in 2021. Robert Everett-Green of The Globe and Mail noted that while an event like TIFF, with its strong programming team, could easily work around the health difficulties of a single programmer, the stated reason for the MWFF's cancellation effectively confirmed the longstanding charges that Losique ran the festival as a personal fiefdom rather than cultivating a team.

In 2022, Losique announced plans to revive the festival as the Global Montreal Film Festival, with a 2022 edition featuring free screenings of a selection of films that had previously screened at FFM, leading to a full revival of the festival in 2023. The free screening series in 2022 attracted only a few dozen people; filmmaker André Forcier, whose 1994 film The Wind from Wyoming (Le Vent du Wyoming) was one of the titles being screened, criticized the event as having been poorly advertised. The 2023 revival did not materialize, and the festival remained unrevived as of Losique's death in 2026.

== Canadian Student Film Festival ==
The festival program also included the Canadian Student Film Festival, a dedicated stream to screen and publicize films by Canadian film students. Originally established by Losique in 1969, almost a decade prior to the launch of the Montreal World Film Festival, and staged at Concordia University, it later became part of the MWFF in 1985, but continued to screen as a distinct stream within the MWFF programming schedule, and presented a number of awards for student films including the Norman McLaren Award for best film.

== Festival awards ==
The festival was organised in various sections, including the World Competition (features and shorts) and First Films World Competition (features), and non-competitive streams for Canadian and world cinema, documentaries, student films and repertory programming of classic films.

Prior to the beginning of each event, the festival's board of directors appointed the juries who held sole responsibility for choosing award winners. Juried awards were presented for the Grand Prix des Amériques, a Special Grand Prix of the jury, Best Director, Best Actress, Best Actor, Best Screenplay, Best Artistic Contribution, Best Short Film, an Innovation Award and gold, silver and bronze Zenith Awards for first films. Audience-voted awards were also presented for the most popular film, the most popular Canadian film, most popular Latin American film, most popular documentary film, and most popular Canadian short film.

=== Grand Prix des Amériques ===
Year	Film	Original Title	Director	Country
1978	Ligabue		Salvatore Nocita	France / Italy
1979	1+1=3 [de]		Heidi Genée	West Germany
1980	The Stunt Man		Richard Rush	United States
1980	Fontamara		Carlo Lizzani	Italy
1981	The Chosen		Jeremy Kagan	United States
1982	Time for Revenge	Tiempo de revancha	Adolfo Aristarain	Argentina
1982	Brimstone and Treacle		Richard Loncraine	United Kingdom
1983	The Go Masters	Mikan no taikyoku	Ji-shun Duan & Jun'ya Satô & Shu'an Liu	Japan / China
1984	The North	El Norte	Gregory Nava	United States / United Kingdom
1985	Our Father	Padre nuestro	Francisco Regueiro	Spain
1986	Betty Blue	37°2 le matin	Jean-Jacques Beineix	France
1987	The Kid Brother	Kenny	Claude Gagnon	Japan / United States / Canada
1988	The Reader	La lectrice	Michel Deville	France
1989	Freedom Is Paradise	S.E.R. - Svoboda eto rai	Sergey Bodrov	Soviet Union
1990	Fallen from Heaven	Caídos del cielo	Francisco J. Lombardi	Peru / Spain
1991	Salmonberries		Percy Adlon	Germany
1992	The Dark Side of the Heart	El lado oscuro del corazón	Eliseo Subiela	Argentina / Canada
1993	Betrayal	Trahir	Radu Mihaileanu	France / Switzerland / Spain / Romania
1994	Once Were Warriors		Lee Tamahori	New Zealand
1995	Georgia		Ulu Grosbard	United States / France
1996	Different for Girls		Richard Spence	United Kingdom / France
1997	Children of Heaven	Bacheha-Ye aseman	Majid Majidi	Iran
1998	The Quarry		Marion Hänsel	Belgium / France / Netherlands / Spain
1998	Full Moon	Vollmond	Fredi M. Murer	Switzerland / Germany / France
1999	Color of Paradise	Rang-e khoda	Majid Majidi	Iran
2000	The Taste of Others	Le goût des autres	Agnès Jaoui	France
2000	Innocence		Paul Cox	Australia / Belgium
2001	Rain	Baran	Majid Majidi	Iran
2001	Abandoned	Torzók	Árpád Sopsits	Hungary
2002	The Best Day of My Life	Il più bel giorno della mia vita	Cristina Comencini	Italy / United Kingdom
2003	The Cordon	Kordon	Goran Markovic	Yugoslavia
2004	The Syrian Bride	Ha-Kala Ha-Surit	Eran Riklis	France / Germany / Israel
2005	Off Screen	Kleisterlee	Pieter Kuijpers	Netherlands / Belgium
2006	A Long Walk	Nagai sanpo	Eiji Okuda	Japan
2006	The Greatest Love of All	O Maior Amor do Mundo	Carlos Diegues	Brazil
2007	Ben X		Nic Balthazar	Belgium / Netherlands
2007	A Secret	Un secret	Claude Miller	France
2008	Departures	Okuribito	Yōjirō Takita	Japan
2009	Freedom	Korkoro	Tony Gatlif	France
2010	Oxygen	Adem	Hans van Nuffel	Belgium / Netherlands
2011	Come as You Are	Hasta la Vista	Geoffrey Enthoven	Belgium
2012	Where the Fire Burns	Ateşin Düştüğü Yer	İsmail Güneş	Turkey
2013	Life Feels Good	Chce sie zyc	Maciej Pieprzyca	Poland
2014	Perfect Obedience	Obediencia perfecta	Luis Urquiza	Mexico
2015	Mad Love	Fou d'amour	Philippe Ramos	France
2016	The Constitution	Ustav Republike Hrvatske	Rajko Grlić	Croatia
2017	And Suddenly the Dawn	Y de pronto el amancer	Silvio Caiozzi	Chile
2018	Curtiz		Tamás Yvan Topolánszky	Hungary

=== Golden Zenith Award ===
Year	Film	Original Title	Director	Country
1989	Queen of Hearts	Queen of Hearts	Jon Amiel	Great Britain
1990	Lost Springtime	Printemps perdu	Alain Mazars	France
1990	Time of the Servants	Cas sluhu	Irena Pavlaskova	Czechoslovakia
1991	Benjamin's Woman	La Mujer de Benjamin	Carlos Carrera	Mexico
1991	North	Nord	Xavier Beauvois	France
1992	Little Sharks	Kleine Haie	Sonke Wortmann	Germany
1993	Betrayal	Trahir	Radu Mihaileanu	Romania / France
1994	Everynight ... Everynight	Everynight... Everynight	Alkinos Tsilimidos	Australia
1995	Cross My Heart and Hope to Die	Ti kniver i hjertet	Marius Holst	Norway
1995	Manneken Pis	Manneken Pis	Frank Van Passel	Belgium
1996	Welcome Home	Okaeri	Makoto Shinozaki	Japan
1997	Gypsy Lore	Romani kris - Cigánytörvény	Bence Gyöngyössy	Germany / Hungary
1998	2 Seconds	2 secondes	Manon Briand	Canada
1999	Juan, I Forgot, I Don't Remember	Del Olvido al no me acuerdo	Juan Carlos Rulfo	Mexico
2000	Daughters of the Sun	Dakhtaran-e khorshid	Mariam Shahriar	Iran
2002	Various Positions	Various Positions	Ori Kowarsky	Canada
2003	I Always Wanted to Be a Saint	J'ai toujours voulu être une sainte	Geneviève Mersch	Luxembourg / Belgium
2004	The Magician	El mago	Jaime Aparicio	Mexico
2005	The Blossoming of Maximo Oliveros	Ang pagdadalaga ni Maximo Oliveros	Auraeus Solito	Philippines
2006	More Than Anything in the World	Más que a nada en el mundo	Andrés León Becker, Javier Solar	Mexico
2007	The Wooden Box	La caja	Juan Carlos Falcón	Spain / Portugal
2008	For a Moment, Freedom	Ein augenblick, freiheit	Arash T. Riahi	Austria / France
2009	You Will Be Mine	Je te mangerai	Sophie Laloy	France
2010	Liquid Love	Amore liquido	Mario Luca Cattaneo	Italy
2011	In Our Name	In Our Name	Brian Welsh	United Kingdom
2012	Casadentro	Casadentro	Joanna Lombardi	Peru
2013	The Long Way Home	Eve Dönüs: Sarikamis 1915	Alphan Eseli	Turkey
2014	González	González: falsos profetas]	Christian Díaz Pardo	Mexico
2015	The Funeral	Chuyi	Qi Wang	China
2016	A Father's Will	Atanyn kereezi	Bakyt Mukul, Dastan Zhapar Uulu	Kyrgyzstan
2017	The Return	Dolaonda	Chul Heo	South Korea
2018	The Gazelle's Dance	El Baile de la Gacela	Iván Porras Méndelez	Costa Rica / Mexico

=== Best Canadian Film ===
The Best Canadian Film award varied over its lifetime, sometimes being presented based on adjudication by a jury and other times as an audience-voted "people's choice" award.

Year	Film	Director	Ref
1978	Tyler	Ralph L. Thomas	
1979	Arthur Miller on Home Ground	Harry Rasky	
1980	It Can't Be Winter, We Haven't Had Summer Yet (Ça peut pas être l'hiver, on n'a même pas eu d'été)	Louise Carré	
1981	The Plouffe Family (Les Plouffe)	Gilles Carle	
1982	The Grey Fox	Phillip Borsos	
1983	The Tin Flute (Bonheur d'occasion)	Claude Fournier	
1984	A Woman in Transit (La Femme de l'hôtel)	Léa Pool	
1985	Pale Face (Visage pâle)	Claude Gagnon	
1986	Sitting in Limbo	John N. Smith	
1987	Night Zoo (Un zoo la nuit)	Jean-Claude Lauzon	
1988	Obsessed	Robin Spry	
1989	Looking for Eternity (Portion d'éternité)	Robert Favreau	
1990	An Imaginary Tale (Une histoire inventée)	André Forcier	
1991	The Savage Woman (La Demoiselle sauvage)	Léa Pool	
1992	Phantom Life (La Vie fantôme)	Jacques Leduc	
1993	The Sex of the Stars (Le Sexe des étoiles)	Paule Baillargeon	
1994	The Wind from Wyoming (Le Vent du Wyoming)	André Forcier	
1995	Water Child (L'Enfant d'eau)	Robert Ménard	
1996	Lilies (Les Feluettes)	John Greyson	
1997	The Caretaker's Lodge (La Conciergerie)	Michel Poulette	
1998	2 Seconds (2 secondes)	Manon Briand	
1999	Memories Unlocked (Souvenirs intimes)	Jean Beaudin	
2000	Maelström	Denis Villeneuve	
2001	Tar Angel (L'ange de goudron)	Denis Chouinard	
2002	Chaos and Desire (La Turbulence des fluides)	Manon Briand	
2003	Gaz Bar Blues	Louis Bélanger	
2004	The Five of Us (Elles étaient cinq)	Ghyslaine Côté	
2005	Kamataki	Claude Gagnon	
2006	The Chinese Botanist's Daughters (Les Filles du botaniste)	Dai Sijie	
2007	Surviving My Mother (Comment survivre à sa mère)	Émile Gaudreault	
2008	The Necessities of Life (Ce qu'il faut pour vivre)	Benoît Pilon	
2009	A Cargo to Africa (Un cargo pour l'Afrique)	Roger Cantin	
2010	Silence Lies (Tromper le silence)	Julie Hivon	
2011	Coteau rouge	André Forcier	
2012	Karakara	Claude Gagnon	
2013	Another House (Un autre maison)	Mathieu Roy	
2014	Sweeping Forward	Patricia MacDowell	
