= Zsófia Szamosi =

Hungarian actress

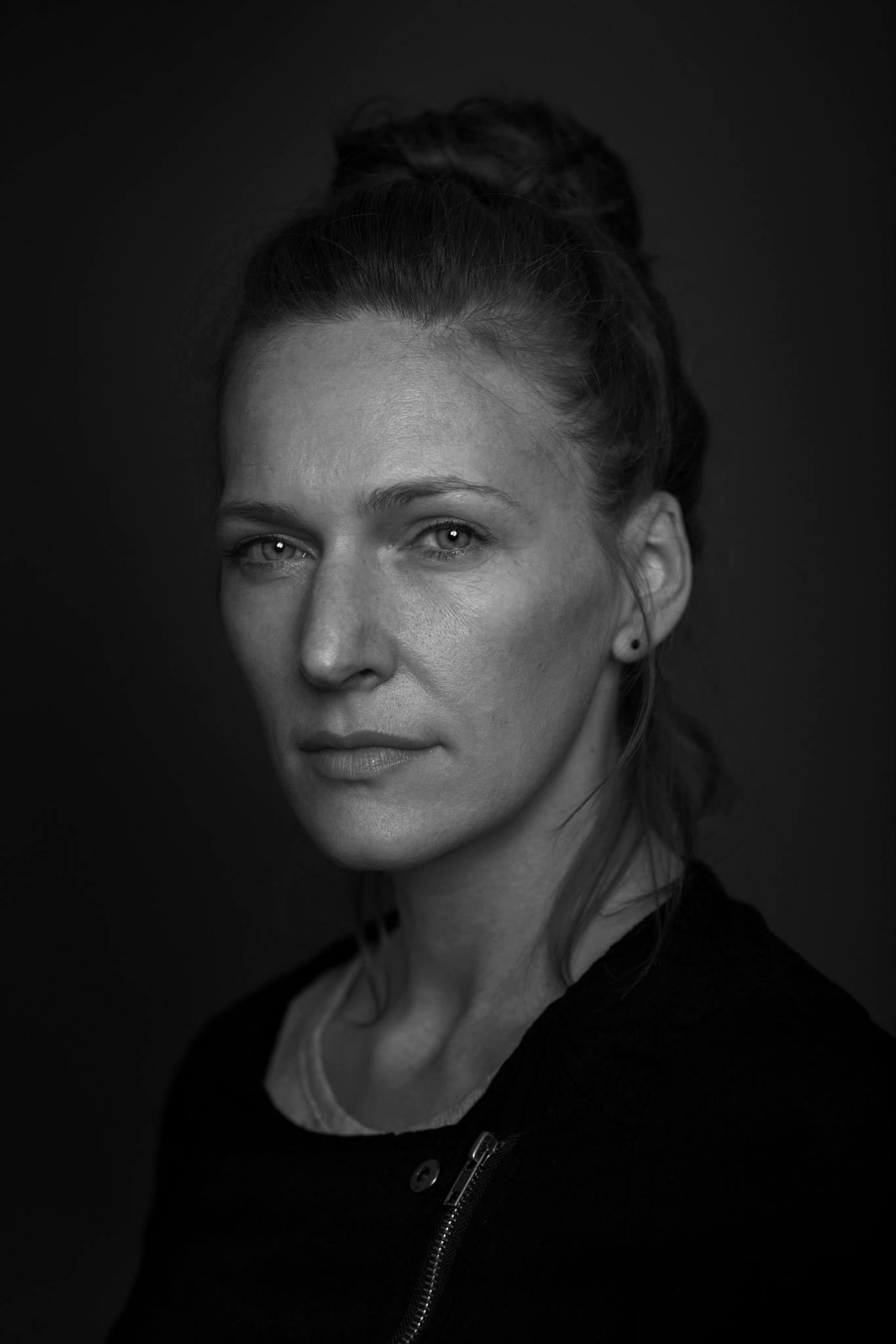
- Born: 12 August 1977 (age 49); Budapest, Hungary
- Education: University of Theatre and Film Arts in Budapest
- Occupation: Actress
- Awards: Jászai Mari Award; 2012; Best Actress – Cairo International Film Festival; 2018 One Day

Zsófia Szamosi (born 12 August 1977) is a Hungarian actress. Her film credits include Sing, Strangled and One Day. Szamosi was also a cast member in the television shows Terápia and The Curse.

== Filmography ==
- 2025: Growing Down, directed by Bálint Dániel Sós - as Krajnyik
- 2023: Tündérkert – Kísértések kora, directed by István Madarász - as Erzsébet Báthory
- 2023: Legyetek szeretettel, directed by Andor Szilágyi - as Tókáné
- 2023: Műanyag égbolt, directed by Tibor Bánóczki and Sarolta Szabó - as Nóra
- 2023: Cella – Letöltendő élet, directed by Mano Csillag - as Anyuka
- 2019: Foglyok, directed by Kristóf Deák - as Ilona
- 2019: Szép csendben, directed by Zoltán Nagy - as Zsuzsa, Nóri's mother
- 2018: One Day (Egy nap), directed by Zsófia Szilágyi - as Anna
- 2017: Vértestek, directed by Lóránd Banner-Szűcs - as Ibolya
- 2017: Sandwich, directed by Attila Hartung - as Colonel
- 2016: Partizánok, directed by Szonja Szabó - as Jankó's mother
- 2016: Strangled (A martfűi rém), directed by Árpád Sopsits - as Rita
- 2016: Enyhén sós, directed by Zoltán Nagy - as Anita
- 2016: Sing (Mindenki), directed by Kristóf Deák - as Erika
- 2015: Az éjszakám a nappalod, directed by András György Dési and Gábor Móray - as Barbara
- 2012: Átok (harmadik évad), directed by Áron Mátyássy
- 2012: Terápia, directed by Attila Gigor and Ildikó Enyedi - as Petra
- 2010–2011: Átok, directed by Áron Mátyássy - as Kati
- 2010: Ünnep, directed by Ádám Császi - as Ildikó
- 2008: Tabló, directed by Gábor Dettre
- 2007: Lora, directed by Gábor Herendi - as Betti
- 2006: Randevú, directed by Ágnes Incze - as Irén
- 2005: Csudafilm, directed by Elemér Ragályi - as Stewardess
- 2004: Állítsátok meg Terézanyut!, directed by Péter Bergendy - as Bankdémon
- 2002: El robador, short film directed by Kornél Mundruczó - as Rosa
- 2001: Pizzás, directed by György Balogh - as Vanda
- 2001: Citromfej, directed by Viktor Bodó - as Krisztina
- 2000: A leghidegebb éjszaka, directed by Péter Gothár - as Feleség

== Awards ==
On 29 November 2018 she won the award for Best Actress at the 40th Cairo International Film Festival for her role in One Day.
