= Curtiz =

Curtiz may refer to:

- Curtiz (film), 2018 film
- Michael Curtiz (1886–1962), Hungarian-American film director
