= Larose, Pierrot and Luce =

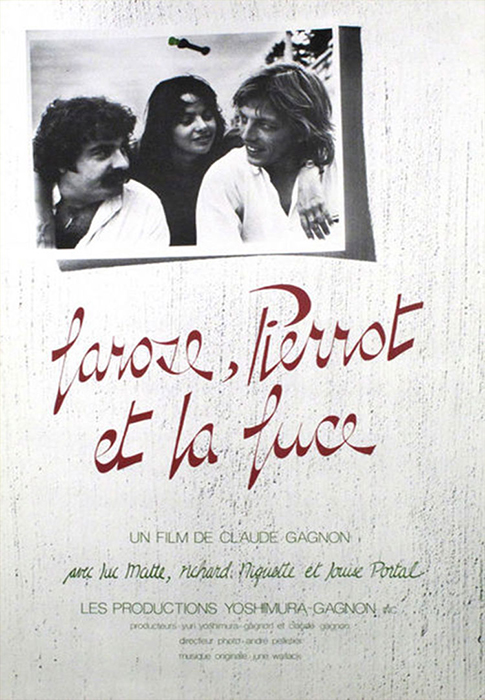
- French: Larose, Pierrot et la Luce
- Directed by: Claude Gagnon
- Screenplay by: Claude Gagnon
- Produced by: Claude Gagnon; Yuri Yoshimura-Gagnon
- Starring: Richard Niquette; Luc Matte; Louise Portal
- Cinematography: André Pelletier
- Edited by: Claude Gagnon
- Music by: June Wallack
- Production company: Productions Yoshimura-Gagnon
- Release date: September 25, 1982
- Running time: 104 minutes
- Countries: Canada; Japan
- Language: French

Larose, Pierrot and Luce (French: Larose, Pierrot et la Luce) is a comedy-drama film, directed by Claude Gagnon and released in 1982. The film stars Richard Niquette as Jacques Larose, a man who has returned to his hometown in Quebec following several years working abroad in diplomatic service. Inheriting his grandmother's run-down old house following her death, he decides to enlist his childhood friend Pierrot Joyal (Luc Matte) to help him renovate it and reconnect following their years of having grown apart, only for Pierrot to unexpectedly bring along his girlfriend Luce (Louise Portal), whose free-spirited ways challenge Jacques's desire for order and predictability.

== Production and distribution ==
Despite being made in Quebec, the film was a Canadian-Japanese co-production, following Gagnon's success in 1979 with his Japanese-made film Keiko. It was shot in summer 1981, in and around Saint-Hyacinthe, Quebec.

The film premiered in Japan in September 1982, and in Quebec in October 1982.

== Legacy ==
The characters of Pierrot and Jacques recurred, portrayed by different actors, in Gagnon's 2020 film Old Buddies (Les Vieux chums), although Gagnon stated that the new film was intended as a standalone work rather than a sequel to or a remake of Larose, Pierrot and Luce. It was based on his own experiences spending time with Matte in the year prior to Matte's death in 2008.
