= Growing Down =

2025 film by Bálint Dániel Sós

- Theatrical release poster
- Hungarian: Minden rendben
- Directed by: Bálint Dániel Sós
- Written by: Bálint Dániel Sós; Gergő V. Nagy
- Produced by: Zoltán Mártonffy; Ádám Farkas
- Starring: Szabolcs Hajdu; Ágoston Sáfrány; Anna Hay; Zonga Jakab-Aponyi; Zsófia Szamosi
- Cinematography: Kristóf Deák
- Edited by: Márton Gothár
- Music by: Ambrus Tövisházi; Máriusz Fodor
- Production company: CineSuper
- Release dates: 14 February 2025 (Berlinale); 20 March 2025 (Hungary)
- Running time: 85 minutes
- Country: Hungary
- Language: Hungarian

Growing Down (Hungarian: Minden rendben) is a 2025 Hungarian crime drama film directed by Bálint Dániel Sós in his directorial debut from a screenplay he co-wrote with Gergő V. Nagy. The film stars Szabolcs Hajdu, Ágoston Sáfrány, Anna Háy, Zonga Jakab-Aponyi, and Zsófia Szamosi.

The film had its world premiere at the 75th Berlin International Film Festival on 14 February 2025.

== Cast ==
- Szabolcs Hajdu as Sándor
- Ágoston Sáfrány as Dénes
- Anna Háy as Klára
- Zonga Jakab-Aponyi as Sári
- Zsófia Szamosi as Krajnyik

== Production ==
In February 2024, National Film Institute Hungary presented the project at the European Film Market. Principal photography began on 14 November 2022 and concluded on 8 January 2023 in Budapest, Hévíz and Salgótarján, Hungary.

== Release ==
Growing Down had its world premiere at the 75th Berlin International Film Festival on 14 February 2025 in the Perspectives section. Prior to the premiere, Goodfellas acquired the film's international sales.

The film was theatrically released in Hungary on 20 March 2025.
