= Dead Awake (2001 film) =

2001 film by Marc S. Grenier

- Poster
- Directed by: Marc S. Grenier
- Written by: Terry Abrahamson
- Produced by: Joanne Forgues; Marc S. Grenier; Avi Lerner (executive producer); Martha Fernandez (line producer)
- Starring: Stephen Baldwin; Macha Grenon; Michael Ironside
- Cinematography: David Franco
- Edited by: Yvann Thibaudeau
- Music by: E.P. Bergen
- Production companies: Locomotion Films; Nu Image Films
- Distributed by: Lions Gate Films (Canada); Millennium Pictures (U.S.)
- Release date: November 6, 2001
- Running time: 98 minutes
- Countries: Canada, U.S.
- Language: English
- Budget: C$4.2 million

Dead Awake (also released as Dead of the Night) is a 2001 black comedy thriller television film directed by Marc S. Grenier and starring Stephen Baldwin, Macha Grenon and Michael Ironside.

== Synopsis ==
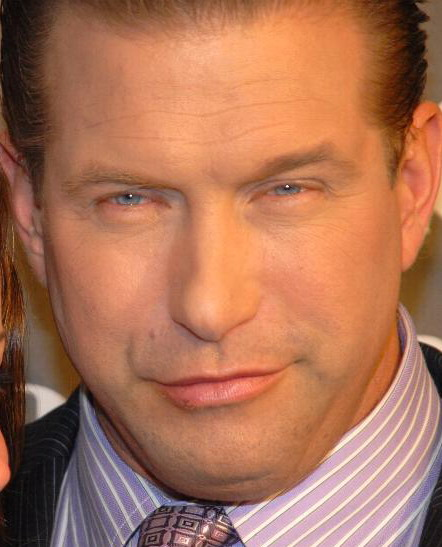
Stephen Baldwin in 2008

Marketing executive Desmond Caine (Stephen Baldwin) is stricken with a bizarre form of insomnia, spending his nights walking the city's dangerous streets at night. Caine ends up at a local deli where he encounters some unusual characters: a nice, if bit lost, young woman (Macha Grenon) and a slightly deranged man who looks homeless (Michael Ironside), and an anti-social policeman.

During one of his half-hallucinogenic journeys, Caine witnesses a brutal murder. He finds the victim's watch and goes to the police. Returning to the scene, there is no sign of the crime.

Stranger still, Caine's girlfriend (Maxim Roy) is completely unaware that he gets up at night and wanders the city, while his personal assistant (Janet Kidder) seems to know all about his exploits. The police discover that the murdered man was connected to Caine's girlfriend; no longer only a witness, he is now the prime suspect...

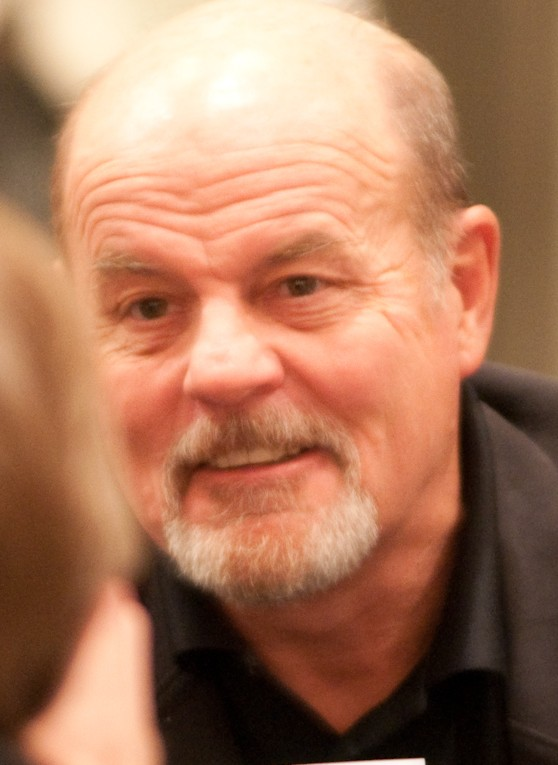
Michael Ironside in 2009

== Cast ==
- Stephen Baldwin as Desmond Caine
- Macha Grenon as W.D.
- Michael Ironside as Skay
- Maxim Roy as Chaney Streeter
- Janet Kidder as Kimberly "Kick" Birmingham
- Claudia Ferri as Lena Savage
- Conrad Pla as Veronica
- Daniel Brochu as Pit Bull Owner
- Rachelle Lefevre as Randi Baum
- Mark Camacho as Window Washer
- Angelo Tsarouchas as Night Manager

== Production ==
=== Background ===
Locomotion Films, part of the Montreal Exponent Group, comprising commercial houses La Fabrique d'Images and S.W.A.T Films, and post and digital effects house Buzz Image Group, was officially launched in 1999 with a view to develop English and French-track feature films, television series, and dramatic shorts. Director and co-producer Marc S. Grenier said he and his colleagues were ready "to do something entirely serious", moving into fiction after working many years in commercials (Grenier directed the 1999 Cinequest Films entry Cause of Death, and the 1998 Motion International television movie Fatal Affair). Dead Awake was made for television, and was Locomotion's second feature production for the year 2000 with a budget of $4.2 million.

=== Writing ===
The screenplay was written by Chicago-based Terry Abrahamson. Two working titles for the film were Wild Awake and Dead of Night.

=== Filming ===
Principal photography took place over twenty days in Montreal, June 9 to July 6, 2000, under the working title Dead of Night. Grenier said that cinematographer David Franco used a lot of interesting wide angle shots, giving the film "an unusual and edgy look." Grenier elaborated: "The whole movie is like a maze. You know there's an exit but it seems unreachable and everything just keeps getting weirder and weirder."

== Release and reception ==
Dead Awake was first broadcast on November 6, 2001.

With a generic title and low-level American star, this could easily be dismissed as another bland straight-to-video thriller... it's a surprisingly eccentric, comic thriller, that plays around with chronology and expectations. A little confusing at times, as it rushes through some explanations, but definitely worth a look. Lots of quirky characters and decent performances -- particularly Grenon and Ironside (both in slightly smaller parts than their billing would suggest) who give delightfully atypical performances as inhabitants of an all-night diner the hero frequents. That's Conrad Pla as the transvestite hooker.

— The Great Canadian Movie Database

=== Distribution ===
In July 2000, it was announced that Dead Awake would be distributed by Lions Gate Films in Canada, by Millennium Pictures in the United States and by Martien Holding internationally.

==== Home media ====
Dead Awake was released on VHS (Millennium) and DVD (First Look Home Entertainment) in 2002.

==== Streaming ====
The film is currently available on Amazon Prime.

=== Critical response ===
The author of Critic Online calls Dead Awake one of the better Canadian thrillers of the early 2000s because of its interesting characters, and one of Stephen Baldwin's best films, because "it incorporates his morose acting style into the script." The Great Canadian Movie Guide assigns the film 3 stars, praising the unconventional performances and imaginative story. Johnny Betts was "surprised" to find that Dead Awake "is actually a decent little movie" with "a plot and doesn't rely on women taking off their clothes every two minutes (a staple in most straight-to-video movies)." Betts also praised the "mix of plot twists, dark humor, and weirdness."
