= Friss Hús Budapest International Short Film Festival =

- Location: Budapest, Hungary
- Founded: 2013
- Awards: Best International Short Film, Best Hungarian Short Film
- Website: www.frisshusbudapest.com

The Friss Hús Budapest International Short Film Festival (Friss Hús meaning "fresh meat") is an international short film festival held annually in Budapest, Hungary. The festival was first organised in 2013 by the Daazo Short Film Centre. During the years films in competition included Kristóf Deák's Oscar-winning short Sing and the Cannes prize winner animation Superbia by Luca Tóth.

== Awards ==
2013	2014
Audience Awards: Dénes Nagy – Lágy eső; Barnabás Tóth – Újratervezés	Awards: Best Hungarian Short Film: Réka Bucsi – Symphony No. 42; Best International Short Film: Chema García Ibarra – Misterio (Spain); Daazo Special Award: Máté Brauner – Előbb adtam; Acnecom Cultural and Design Agency Special Award: Attila Hartung – Ischler; Audience Award: István Kovács – Csúszópénz; Special mentions by the jury: Ábel Visky – Játszótársak; Áron Szentpéteri – Delfinkirály; Bálint Gelley – Otthon
2015	2016
Awards: Best Hungarian Short Film: Fanni Szilágyi – A kamaszkor vége; Best Hungarian Short Animation: Zsuzsanna Kreif and Borbála Zétényi – Limbo Limbo Travel; Best International Short Film: Daisy Jacobs – The Bigger Picture (UK); Special mentions by the jury: Péter Lichter – Rimbaud; Barbara Ott – Sunny; Pitch Forum Awards: Nándor Lovas Award (best film project of the pitch forum): Gergő Nagy V. – Erős áll	Awards: Best Hungarian Short Film: Áron Ferenczik – Szabó úr; Best Hungarian Short Animation: Réka Bucsi – LOVE; Best International Short Film: Fyzal Boulifa – Rate Me (UK); Special mentions by the jury: Live action section: Kata Oláh – En passant; Fanni Szilágyi – Fehér farkas; Animation section: Milán Kopasz – Beyond; Pitch Forum Awards: Nándor Lovas Award: Kristóf Deák – A legjobb játék (Best Game Ever); Daazo.com gave an honorable mention to Sing by Kristóf Deák.
2017	2018
Awards: Best Hungarian Short Film: Ádám Freund – Földiek; Best Hungarian Short Animation: Luca Tóth – Superbia; Best Hungarian Actor: Benett Vilmányi – for his roles in Asszó and Welcome; Best Hungarian Actress: Annamária Láng – for her role in Nem történt semmi; Best International Short Film: Erik Ivar Saether & Nicolai Berg Hansson: Glass House (Norway); Audience Award in the Expats Section: Anikó Steinmetz – Kiút; Daazo Film Distribution Special Award: Júlia Halász and Anna Rubi – A Birodalom utolsó napja; OTP Junior Award (most promising Hungarian director under 30): Tamás Fekete – Asszó; Special mentions by the jury: Live action section: Ambrus Fatér – Légmell; Áron Szentpéteri – Láthatatlanul; International Section: Leonardo van Dijl – Umpire; Pitch Forum Awards: Nándor Lovas Nándor Award: Árpád Hermán – Goodbye Frank; Momentan Company Special Award: Árpád Hermán – Goodbye Frank; Film Review Competition: Best Film Review: Nóra Rostoványi – A felszabadulás konfliktusai; The jury of the film review competition gave special mentions to reviews by Attila Benke, Bence Illyés, Ákos Varga és Tamás Szerényi.	Awards: Best Hungarian Short Film: Hajni Kis – Last Call; Best Hungarian Short Animation: Olivér Hegyi – Take Me Please; Best Hungarian Actor: Norbert Nagy – for his role in Rossz színész (Bad Actor); Best Hungarian Actress: Anikó Für – for her role in Anyák napja (Mother's Day); Best International Short Film: Kaveh Mazaheri – Retouch (Iran); Most promising Hungarian director under 30: Szabolcs Nagy – Fiaskó (Fiasco); Special mentions by the jury: Hungarian Section: Péter Vácz – Párnaarc (Pillowface); Kristóf Deák – A legjobb játék (Best Game Ever); István Kovács – Ostrom (Siege); International Section: Sorayos Prapapan – Death of the Sound Man; Audience Awards: Best Queer Short Film: Hajni Kis – Szép alak (Beautiful Figure); Best Horror Short Film: Teemu Niukkanen – Fucking Bunnies; Best International Short Film: Chintis Lundgren – Manivald (Estonia); Best Film Poster: László Brunszkó – Rossz színész (Bad Actor); Pitch Forum Awards: Nándor Lovasi Award – Ákos K. Kovács – Branka; Film Review Competition: Best Film Review: Simor Kamilla – Millió dolláros bébi dán módra; The jury of the film review competition gave special mentions to reviews by Mária Gubán and Ákos Varga.
