= Péter Kovács (serial killer) =

Hungarian rapist and serial killer

- Born: January 11, 1934; Szolnok, Regency of Hungary
- Died: December 1, 1968 (aged 34); Szeged, Hungarian People's Republic
- Cause of death: Execution by hanging
- Other name: "The Martfű Monster"
- Conviction: Murder
- Penalty: Death

Details
- Victims: 4–5+
- Span of crimes: 1957–1967
- Country: Hungary
- State: Szolnok
- Date apprehended: August 11, 1967

Péter Kovács (January 11, 1934 – December 1, 1968), known as The Martfű Monster, was a Hungarian rapist and serial killer known for his crimes around the southern settlements of Szolnok. The case surrounding his murder series is controversial, as an innocent man was initially accused of his crimes.

== The first murder ==
Kovács worked as a truck driver in the area around Martfű, and frequently travelled around the settlements. He was familiar with the terrain in the outskirts of the inhabited area that he used in his first murder. Unlike most serial killers, Kovács was considered an average man with a normal background, who had built his own family and house, and was well regarded by his employer. On July 22, 1957, Kovács went to see the Argentine movie Abuso de confianza in the local cinema. In one scene from the film, a man acted violently towards a woman, which excited Kovács so much that he decided that he wanted to act violently towards a woman in real life. He left the movie theater and went to the Tisza Cipő shoe factory, at the gate of which the workers were finishing their afternoon shift, where he caught a glimpse of a lone girl who was walking home towards Tiszaföldvár on a dirt road. Although he did not know the woman, he bicycled after her on an unlit street. While in the dark, Kovács used a piece of iron to strike the woman's head before he raped, suffocated, and disposed of her in a drainage ditch. Kovács returned home after hiding the victim's body.

The corpse was found the next day by workers. The police rapidly investigated the victim's relationships and became aware of one such relationship at work – she had a friendly, but emotionally insufficient, relationship with her colleague, János Kirják. The police brought Kirják for questioning, but he gave contradicting statements. His alibi, provided by his mother, could not be proven. Investigators believed that he had waited for the victim to go home and asked her to date him, but her denial enraged Kirják to the point that he killed her. The investigators proceeded to pressure him into confessing, while the Martfű population became more and more outraged. In the end, Kirják signed a confession. Kovács appeared in a massive crowd on an on-site reconstruction of the murder. Based on the evidence presented by the prosecution and his own written confession, Kirják was sentenced to death by the Szolnok County Court. The Supreme Court of Hungary reconsidered the decision after renegotiations, and he was instead sentenced to life imprisonment in Szeged's Star Prison.

== 1960s attacks ==
The first murder was not followed up by Kovács for years, and he married and built a house for his family. On the night of November 13, 1963, he attacked a woman in the village of Homok; he struck the woman with a hammer and tore her clothes off, but he was unable to finish the murder for unknown reasons. She was found soon after, and her life was saved through rapid medical intervention. Half a year later, on March 21, 1964, another unfinished murder attempt took place in the area, the perpetrator attacked a lone passerby, but she ducked a hammer blow to the back of the head with a reflex action, so the strong blow only hit her neck and she was able to escape.

On May 4, 1964, a woman's corpse was found near Nagyrév. The body was in a bad state, and it was estimated that it had been in the water for about a month. There was no sign of foul play and the cause of death was listed as drowning. In April 1965, the body of a teenage girl was found in the Tisza River. No signs of a crime could be found on the damaged corpse, and the conclusion was that the girl had committed suicide. The police came to realize that there could be a serial killer roaming the area, as there were several similar patterns found in both cases. Between April and May 1965, authorities conducted a thorough examination of 40 men in the area, including Kovács. However, since he was a man with a well-established family and work background, he was excluded from the list of potential perpetrators, and the investigation concluded without any results.

== Arrest, trial, and execution ==
On June 20, 1967, a female corpse was found near the Körös river by Öcsöd. Before her death, the woman was beaten and her skull was fractured and her body mutilated. Remains of blood and tissue were also found on the railing of the nearby Körös bridge, leading to the assumption that the body had been pushed into the river from the bridge. Investigators re-examined the possibility of a link between the bodies of young women previously found in rivers in the area and the murder in Öcsöd. The victim's skull injury also raised the question of the identity of the perpetrator of the Öcsöd murder and the unknown person who attacked the women on their way home with hammer blows to the head. Authorities found a small piece of glass under the victim's nail.

Kovács, who was discovered to be missing for a day before the body was found, used the work truck for personal reasons, which gave him the opportunity to commit the murders. Kovács' wife confirmed her husband's alibi, but the investigators did not believe her and continued their investigation. While examining the corporate truck driven by Kovács, they found glass shards on the driver's seat from Kovács accidentally catching the vehicle on the closing chain of the shoe factory, breaking the truck's windshield on June 19. The same fragments were also found on his clothing. Investigators' efforts to find witnesses were also successful, and more eyewitnesses testified seeing Kovács, his brother-in-law, and the victim in a pub. Kovács was arrested on August 11, 1967, after his brother-in-law had been summoned: the man confessed that they had sex with the victim, and left the woman to Kovács, who was to drive her home. Kovács initially denied any involvement, but two days later admitted to murdering the woman. By the end of August, Kovács admitted to killing several women around the Tisza. By February 1968, the prosecutor learned that he had murdered the girl near the Tisza Cipő shoe factory, and not Kirják. Kovács was also questioned about another murder, but he could not be summoned for it.

Kirják was released after 11 years behind bars, while Kovács, who admitted to four murders and two unsuccessful attacks, was sentenced to death by the Szolnok County Court, with the verdict upheld by the Supreme Court. His subsequent request for clemency was rejected by the Presidential Council, and he was hanged on December 1, 1968.

== In the media ==
In 2015, Árpád Sopsits began filming a movie based on Kovács titled A martfűi rém (The Martfű monster). On November 10, 2016, the film debuted, with Kovács (renamed to Pál Bognár) being played by Hadjuk Károly.

== See also ==
- List of serial killers by country
