= Tamás Yvan Topolánszky =

Hungarian film director, screenwriter, and producer

- Born: January 28, 1987 (age 39); Männedorf, Switzerland
- Citizenship: Hungarian
- Education: Veres Pálné Secondary GS; Moholy-Nagy University of Art and Design
- Occupations: Film director, screenwriter, producer
- Awards: New York Short Film Festival, New York; Grand Prix, Best Short Film – 2015; LA Indie Film Fest, Los Angeles; Best Director – 2015; Montreal World Film Festival, Montreal; Grand Prix des Amériques Award for Best First Feature Film – 2018; Burbank International Film Festival, Burbank, USA, Best Foreign Language Film – 2019; Riviera Independent Film Festival, Sestri Levante, Italy; Best Director – 2019

Tamás Yvan Topolánszky (Männedorf, Switzerland, January 28, 1987) is a Hungarian film director, screenwriter, producer, and winner of several international awards.

== Early years, studies ==
Tamás Yvan Topolánszky was born in Switzerland in 1987 and later moved to Hungary with his family. He graduated from the Veres Pálné Secondary Grammar School in Budapest in 2005. He continued his university studies at the Moholy-Nagy University of Art and Design, where he graduated in media design in the class of Péter Fazekas, László Csáki and János Szirtes in 2015.

== Career ==
In 2011, before starting university, Topolánszky founded the HalluciNation production office with two partners. His first film was Bath: An American Urban Legend, made in 2014. It was a short film nominated for an award at both the Hungarian Independent Film Festival and the Catalina Film Festival in Los Angeles.

His second short film was also made in 2014. The drama film Letter to God has won awards for both Best Film and Best Director at several international film festivals. The film has won awards at festivals such as the Los Angeles Short Film Festival, the New York Short Film Festival and the Winter Film Awards. The distribution rights to Letter to God were later acquired by HBO for Central and Eastern Europe.

In 2016, Topolánszky and his producer wife, Claudia Sümeghy set up their production company JUNO11 Pictures. He made his documentary film A lehetetlen határán (On the Edge of the Impossible) that year, in collaboration with the Magyar Paralimpiai Bizottság. The film tells the story of Hungarian para-sport through the lives of five successful athletes. The film was screened as part of the opening ceremony of the 2016 Rio Paralympics and was shown in hundreds of schools on February 22, 2018, the Hungarian Para Sports Day, in cooperation with the Magyar Paralimpiai Bizottság. The film was screened regularly in online film clubs five years after its release, ahead of the 2020 Tokyo Paralympics, and the screenings were accompanied by discussions with the filmmakers.

Topolánszky directed several commercials, animations, documentaries and short films before he started making his first feature film. One of his most popular works was the trailer for the film project DVNA, which he made as his graduation project in 2015. The mood film was seen by 300,000 viewers in two days thanks to positive press coverage. In mid-2021, it was the most viewed Hungarian trailer on YouTube with more than 800,000 views. The film project is being developed into a series with the support of the Nemzeti Filmintézet.

Budapest's international tourism campaign was launched under the slogan Spice of Europe, with an image film directed by Topolánszky. The campaign film, which premiered in 2018, was broadcast continuously on online platforms around the world by several prominent international TV channels, including CNN. The film has been included in the academic on nation branding. Topolánszky, in response to university invitations, analyzed together with the students the content and artistic means of nation branding in Spice of Europe.

Topolánszky's first feature film, Curtiz, is an English-Hungarian historical drama about the famous Oscar-winning Hungarian film director Michael Curtiz, made with the support of the NMHH Médiatanács Magyar Média Mecenatúra. The film gives viewers an insight into the few months during the shooting of the classic film Casablanca in 1942, when Curtiz had to deal with political censorship, his troubled family relationships, and, most of all, his own egotistical, aggressive personality.

Topolánszky stressed the importance of filmmaking as a team effort, where the director realizes his vision with the help of his creative team.

The film won, among others, the Grand Prix des Amériques Award for Best First Feature Film, the most prestigious category of the 2018 Montreal World Film Festival. This makes Topolánszky the second and last Hungarian film director to win the main prize at the festival, after Árpád Sopits, as this was the last Montreal Film Festival in 2018.

In addition to the Montreal award, Topolánszky won the Best Director Award at the 2019 Riviera International Film Festival in Sestri Levante; the Best Foreign Language Film Award at the 2019 Burbank International Film Festival, and the Best Directorial Debut Award at the 2019 Camerimage Festival.

Since 2020, the film is available worldwide on Netflix.

In 2021, Topolánszky was listed as producer of the film Magasságok és mélységek / Heights and Depths.

== Awards ==
=== Bath: An American Urban Legend ===
Hungarian Independent Film Festival, Budapest; Nominated for award – 2014

Catalina Film Festival, Los Angeles; Nominated for award – 2014

=== Letter to God ===
- New York Short Film Festival, New York City; Grand Prix, Best Short Film – 2015
- LA Indie Film Fest, Los Angeles; Best Director – 2015
- Winter Film Awards, New York City; Best Short Film – 2016
- HSC – Golden Eye Cinematographer Film Festival, Budapest; Best Short Film – 2014

=== Curtiz ===
- Montreal World Film Festival, Montreal; Grand Prix des Amériques Award for Best First Feature Film – 2018
- Riviera Independent Film Festival, Sestri Levante, Italy; Best Director – 2019
- Burbank International Film Festival, Burbank, USA; Best Foreign Language Film – 2019
- HSC – Golden Eye Cinematography Film Festival, Budapest; Best Television Film – 2019
- The International Film Festival of the Art of Cinematography Camerimage, Bydgoszcz, Poland; Best Directorial Debut – 2019
