= La Conciergerie =

La Conciergerie may refer to:

- The Conciergerie, a former courthouse and prison in Paris, France,
- The Caretaker's Lodge (La Conciergerie), a 1997 Canadian thriller film.
