= Superbia (film) =

- Directed by: Luca Tóth
- Written by: Luca Tóth
- Release date: 17 May 2016 (Cannes)
- Running time: 15 minutes
- Country: Hungary

Superbia is a 2016 Hungarian animated short film directed by Luca Tóth. The film had its premiere in the Critics' Week section at the 69th Cannes Film Festival, and later competed at film festivals like Palm Springs International Film Festival, Chicago International Film Festival and Sarajevo Film Festival, and won the Best Hungarian Animation Award at the 5th Friss Hús Budapest International Short Film Festival.

== Plot ==
According to the official synopsis, in the short "the native people of the land of Superbia, where men and women form separate societies, face the changes sparked by the first equal couple in their history".
