= Michel St-Martin =

Canadian cinematographer

Michel St-Martin is a Canadian cinematographer. He is most noted for his work on the 2019 film Blood Quantum, for which he received a Canadian Screen Award nomination for Best Cinematography at the 9th Canadian Screen Awards in 2021.

His other credits have included the films File Under Miscellaneous, Karakara, Rhymes for Young Ghouls and Old Buddies (Les Vieux chums), and episodes of the television series This Life and Bad Blood.
