= Symphony No. 42 (film) =

- Directed by: Réka Bucsi
- Written by: Réka Bucsi
- Release date: February 2014 (Berlin)
- Running time: 10 minutes
- Countries: Hungary

Symphony No. 42 is a 2014 Hungarian animated short film directed by Réka Bucsi. The film had its premiere at the Berlinale Shorts Competition. It is adapted as a segment in the FXX anthology series Cake.

== Plot ==
The short consists of 47 loosely connected scenes revolving around the "irrational connections between human and nature".

== Awards and nominations ==
- 38th Hong Kong International Film Festival – Special Mention for Best Short Film (2014)
- Friss Hús Budapest International Short Film Festival – Best Hungarian Short Film (2014)
- Primanima World Festival of First Animations – George Pal Prize, Best Graduation Film (2014)
- Anilogue International Animation Festival – Audience Award and Special Jury Mention (2014)
- Hiroshima International Animation Festival – Hiroshima Prize (2014)
- 3. Kyiv International Short Film Festival – Best Film Award, Audience Award (2014)
- 50th Chicago International Film Festival – Gold Plaque (2014)
- Vilnius International Film Festival – Best Short Film (2015)
