= Kamataki =

2005 film

- Directed by: Claude Gagnon
- Written by: Claude Gagnon
- Produced by: Claude Gagnon; Samuel Gagnon; Eiji Okuda; Yuri Yoshimura-Gagnon
- Starring: Matthew Smiley; Tatsuya Fuji; Kazuko Yoshiyuki
- Cinematography: Hideho Urata
- Edited by: Claude Gagnon; Takaka Miyahira
- Music by: Jorane
- Production companies: NHK; Zero Pictures; Zuno Films
- Distributed by: Filmoption
- Release date: August 31, 2005 (FFM)
- Running time: 110 minutes
- Countries: Canada; Japan
- Languages: English; Japanese

Kamataki is a Canadian-Japanese co-produced drama film, directed by Claude Gagnon and released in 2005.

The film stars Matthew Smiley as Ken-Antoine, a young Canadian man of mixed Japanese and European descent from Montreal who is distraught over the recent death of his father, and who is sent to live with his uncle Takuma (Tatsuya Fuji) in Japan after a suicide attempt. Takuma, a master craftsman in traditional Japanese pottery, consumes alcohol heavily and navigates casual sexual relationships with several different women, thus confounding many of Ken-Antoine's expectations; nevertheless, Ken-Antoine finds new meaning and purpose in life through his developing relationship with his uncle and his reconnection with his Japanese heritage.

The film's cast also includes Naho Watanabe, Kazuko Yoshiyuki, Lisle Wilkerson and Christopher Heyerdahl.

== Production ==
According to Gagnon, the film was originally inspired by the fact that his own daughter had at least six of her school friends commit suicide while she was a teenager. The original draft of the screenplay, written in the 1990s, did not incorporate the Japanese aspect, with the uncle instead being a painter to be played by Anthony Quinn; however, as Quinn was elderly and in poor health at that time, Gagnon had difficulty securing production funding and was eventually forced into bankruptcy after having to invest his own money in the film. After rebuilding his career and financial stability through other writing, directing and acting work, he rewrote the film's screenplay and commenced production in the 2000s.

Smiley, an active athlete, was cast in the lead role despite being more physically fit than Gagnon intended his character to be, and spent several months not exercising and changing his diet to lose muscle mass in preparation for the role. He is also not of Asian descent, but was cast due to an "exotic" and "chameleon-like" appearance that can resemble partial Asian heritage. He was, however, able to bring his own experiences into the role, as his own mother had died in 2003 shortly before production began on the film.

== Distribution ==
The film premiered on August 31, 2005 at the Montreal World Film Festival, before going into commercial release in 2006.

The film faced some controversy in advance of its screening at the Reelworld Film Festival in Toronto, when the Ontario Film Review Board rated it "18A". Although it has some sexual content that was generally accepted as not suitable for very young children, the content was mild and not explicit; no other film rating agency in the world had previously deemed it inappropriate for teenagers, and many of its prior screenings at film festivals had been in youth-oriented programs. The rating was successfully appealed, and dropped to "14A" by the time of the screening.

== Critical response ==
Eddie Cockrell of Variety praised the performances, writing that "Enhancing the central metaphor are sure turns by the leads. Smiley toned down a sculpted physique to play the initially surly Ken, and his performance is a quiet jewel of unarticulated grief augmented by dawning confidence. Fuji, star of Nagisa Ōshima’s twin landmarks In the Realm of the Senses and Empire of Passion, as well as Kiyoshi Kurosawa’s recent Bright Future, gives a marvelously nuanced and mischievous reading of Takuma. Yoshiyuki, his co-star in Passion, has a lovely depth to her stillness. Wilkerson, who grew up in Tokyo, is a commanding presence in her first lead role after years of voiceover work.

Writing for the Electronic Journal of Contemporary Japanese Studies, Peter Matanle praised the film for its avoidance of the "Asian mystic" trope common in Western films about Asia. "Gone are the strange two-dimensional stereotypes so favoured by patronising, prejudiced and, it has to be said, racist Hollywood production teams, and in are the complexities, nuances, weaknesses, and plain humanity of ordinary Japanese. Thus, while recognising that Takuma is considerably older and wiser than Ken, the film is not tempted to descend into orientalist fantasies of portraying him as an eastern mystic. Instead we are left in no doubt that Takuma is simply a man who has experienced much in life and who has made, and learnt from, his own mistakes."

== Awards ==
The film won five awards at the Montreal World Film Festival, including Most Popular Film, Most Popular Canadian Film, Best Director, the International Critics' Jury Prize and the Prize of the Ecumenical Jury.

In February 2006 the film screened in the 14Plus section at the 56th Berlin International Film Festival, where it received a special mention from the Crystal Bear award jury.

The film received two Jutra Award nominations at the 9th Jutra Awards in 2007, for Best Director (Gagnon) and Best Original Music (Jorane).
