= The Grandson =

- Directed by: Kristóf Deák
- Starring: Gergő Blahó; Tamás Jordán; Gábor Jászberényi
- Release date: 6 January 2022
- Running time: 1h 55min
- Country: Hungary
- Language: Hungarian

The Grandson (Hungarian: Az unoka) is a 2022 Hungarian revenge thriller film directed by Kristóf Deák.

== Cast ==
- Gergő Blahó - Rudi
- Tamás Jordán - Grandfather
- Gábor Jászberényi - Doma
- Judit Pogány - Anci's mother
- Judit Bárdos - Vera
- János Papp - Uncle Gyuri
