= Kenny (1988 film) =

1988 film by Claude Gagnon

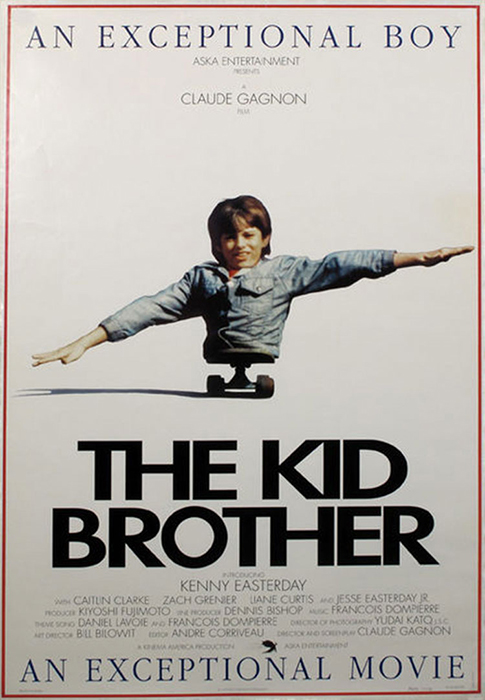
- Directed by: Claude Gagnon
- Written by: Claude Gagnon
- Produced by: Kiyoshi Fujimoto
- Starring: Kenny Easterday; Caitlin Clarke; Liane Curtis; Zach Grenier
- Cinematography: Katsuhiro Kato
- Edited by: André Corriveau
- Music by: François Dompierre
- Distributed by: Aska Film Distributors
- Release date: November 18, 1988
- Running time: 95 minutes
- Countries: Japan; United States; Canada
- Language: English

Kenny (also known as The Kid Brother) is a 1988 drama film featuring Kenny Easterday in a semi-autobiographical role, directed by Claude Gagnon.

== Plot ==
Thirteen-year-old Kenny lives with his family in the Pittsburgh suburb of West Aliquippa, Pennsylvania. He is just like any other kid his age, spending his free time skateboarding and sparring with his older brother, Eddy. The only thing separating Kenny from his peers is that he was born with an incredibly rare congenital condition that led to the amputation of his legs and pelvis.

A French-speaking Quebec film crew descends on Kenny's neighborhood to make a documentary about his adaptation to his unusual condition. The filming of the documentary puts a strain on Kenny, Eddy, and parents Sharon and Jesse. Tensions are exacerbated when Kenny's older sister moves back home, eager for the camera spotlight. Kenny is compelled to hit the road on his own for a journey of self-discovery.

== Cast ==
- Kenny Easterday as Kenny
- Caitlin Clarke as Sharon
- Liane Curtis as Sharon Kay
- Zach Grenier as Jesse
- Jesse Easterday Jr. as Eddy
- Bingo O'Malley as Mr. Nilan
- Barbara Russell as Woman #1

== Awards and nominations ==
Kenny won the Special Jury Prize at the Paris Film Festival (1988), Grand Prix des Amériques at the Montreal World Film Festival (1987), and UNICEF Award - Honorable Mention and C.I.F.E.J. Award at the Berlin International Film Festival (1988).

== Home media ==
On August 25, 2022, Vinegar Syndrome issued a Blu-ray 4K release of The Kid Brother. The edition includes an interview with director Claude Gagnon and audio commentary from film historian Kier-La Janisse and film critic Ralph Elawani.
