= Macha Grenon =

Canadian actress

Macha Grenon (born June 7, 1968) is a Canadian film and television actress.

Born in Montreal, Quebec, Grenon's credits include roles in the television series Urban Angel, Scoop, Le cœur a ses raisons, Emily of New Moon, Nouvelle adresse and H_{2}O, as well as the films The Pianist, Stardom, Familia, Windsor Protocol, You Can Thank Me Later, Days of Darkness, Barney's Version and The Year Dolly Parton Was My Mom. She garnered a Best Actress nomination at the 26th Genie Awards for her performance in Familia.

Her father, Michel Grenon, was a history professor at the Université du Québec à Montréal, and her grandfather, Hector Grenon, was a historian who wrote several books on the history of Montreal.

== Selected filmography ==
- Liberace: Behind the Music - 1988
- The Night of the Visitor (La nuit du visiteur) - 1990
- The Pianist - 1991
- The Myth of the Male Orgasm - 1993
- Mistaken Identity (Erreur sur la personne) - 1996
- The Ideal Man (L'Homme idéal) - 1996
- Windsor Protocol - 1997
- The Caretaker's Lodge (La Conciergerie) - 1997
- You Can Thank Me Later - 1998
- Family Pack (Que faisaient les femmes pendant que l'homme marchait sur la lune?) - 2000
- Stardom - 2000
- Dead Awake - 2001
- Familia - 2005
- Days of Darkness (L'Âge des ténèbres) - 2007
- The Child Prodigy (L'Enfant prodige) - 2010
- Barney's Version - 2010
- The Year Dolly Parton Was My Mom - 2011
- April and the Twisted World - 2015
- Boundaries - 2016
- So Long, Marianne- 2024
