= Anna Udvardy =

Hungarian film producer (1949–2019)

Anna Udvardy (Hungarian: [ˈɒnnɒ ˈudvɒrdi]; 1949 – 23 May 2019) was a Hungarian film producer and production manager. Best known for her work on Sing as producer, which earned her critical appraisal and recognition including an Academy Award for Best Live Action Short Film at the 89th Academy Awards in 2017. Udvardy died on 23 May 2019, at the age of 69.

== Filmography ==
- 1987: Pretty Girls (Documentary) (production staff)
- 1975: Anya gyermekkel (Documentary short) (production staff)
- 1977: Kié a müvészet (production staff)
- 1977: Távolodóban (Documentary short) (production staff)
- 1983: Mogürt video (Documentary short) (production manager)
- 1983: Montázs a NIKEX-röl (Documentary short) (production manager)
- 1983: Turbó-cooker (Documentary short) (production manager)
- 1984: Néhány lépés az óceánon át (Documentary short) (production manager)
- 1985: Miért dohányozzunk? (Documentary short) (production manager)
- 2005: Rossz helyen szálltunk le (Short) (production manager)
- 2007: Filmesek egymás között - Rekviem egy filmgyárért
- 2007: Sínjárók (production manager)
- 2007: Eszter (Documentary short) (production manager)
- 2010: Epilogue (Short) (producer)
- 2012: Mélylevegö (Short) (producer)
- 2013: Mariann eljegyzése (Short) (executive in charge of production)
- 2016: Sing (Mindenki) (Short) (producer)

== Awards ==
- Academy Award for Best Live Action Short Film – Sing
