= Sing (2016 Hungarian film) =

Film by Kristóf Deák

- Film poster
- Directed by: Kristóf Deák
- Written by: Kristóf Deák
- Produced by: Kristóf Deák; Anna Udvardy
- Starring: Dorka Gáspárfalvi; Dorottya Hais; Zsófia Szamosi
- Cinematography: Róbert Maly
- Edited by: Manó Csillag
- Music by: Ádám Balázs
- Production company: Meteor Filmstúdió
- Release date: 28 February 2016 (Hungary)
- Running time: 25 minutes
- Country: Hungary
- Language: Hungarian

Sing (Hungarian: Mindenki, meaning "Everybody") is a 2016 Hungarian short film directed and written by Kristóf Deák. Set in 1991, it follows the story of a girl who moves to a new elementary school and becomes a member of the award-winning school choir. In 2017, the film won the Oscar for Best Live Action Short Film at the 89th Academy Awards. The film also won the best National Films.

== Plot ==
The story takes place in Budapest in 1991. Zsófi (Dorka Gáspárfalvi) moves to a new elementary school and becomes friends with Liza (Dorottya Hais). Zsófi joins the award-winning school choir but she is told not to sing out loud because Erika, the teacher, does not consider her good enough, and the choir is preparing for a competition where they can win a trip to Sweden. Zsófi is visibly hurt, but she obeys the teacher and keeps her request secret from the other children.

Liza notices that Zsófi does not sing, and Zsófi tells her about the teacher's request. At the next choir rehearsal Liza confronts the teacher, but she is told that it is in the best interest of the choir that only the good singers sing out loud. Erika also tells Liza that she did not want to publicly shame those who cannot sing well, but now she asks all of them to raise their hands. Zsófi is surprised when she realizes that she was far from being the only one who was not allowed to sing. Later she tells Liza she has a plan.

The day of the competition arrives. Erika's choir is supposed to start singing, and all the children start silently mouthing the lyrics, and no one sings. When a frustrated Erika leaves the stage, the children start to sing.

== Cast ==
- Dorka Gáspárfalvi as Zsófi
- Dorottya Hais as Liza (singing voice: Rebeka Walton)
- Zsófia Szamosi as Ms Erika

The film features the choir of the Bakáts Square Musical Primary School from Budapest.

== Production ==
The film's plot is based on a story that director Kristóf Deák heard from a Swedish friend. The first screenplay was written in 2012 with two English comedians Bex Harvey and Christian Azzola, and was originally set in an English-language environment instead of Hungary. In 2014 Deák rewrote the screenplay and received a funding of 8,000,000 forints from the National Media and Communications Authority (the highest amount that can be awarded for short and experimental films). An additional 2,000,000 forints came from the state, the filmmakers and the production company Meteor Filmstudio.

It was the first starring role for both Dorka Gáspárfalvi and Dorottya Hais, who were chosen from eighty children auditioning for the roles. The choir was chosen from among five school choirs.

The film was shot during six days; editing and post-production took a year to complete. The film was finished in the second half of 2015.

== Awards and nominations ==
The film received the following awards and nominations:

List of accolades
Award / Film festival	Category	Recipient(s)	Result
Friss Hús Budapest International Short Film Festival 2016	Daazo - Special Mention		
European Film Festival of Lille 2016	Audience Award		
Lanzarote International Film Festival 2016	Best Short International Film - Audience Award		
Olympia International Film Festival for Children and Young People 2016	Best Short Fiction Film - International Jury Award		Won
Sapporo Short Fest 2016	Best Children Actress	Dorka Gáspárfalvi, Dorottya Hais	
Sapporo Short Fest 2016	Audience Award		
KUKI International Short Film Festival for Children and Youth Berlin 2016	Best Short Film KUKI 2nd Prize		
Short Shorts Film Festival & Asia 2016	International Competition - Best Short Film		Won
Short Shorts Film Festival & Asia 2016	International Competition - Grand Prix		Won
TIFF Kids - Toronto International Film Festival 2016	People's Choice Award - Best Short Film		Won
Chicago International Children's Film Festival 2016	Live-Action Short Film - Adult's Jury Award		Won
89th Academy Awards 2017	Academy Award for Best Live Action Short Film		Won
55th Hungarian Film Critics Award 2017	Best Female Actor in a supporting role	Zsófia Szamosi	

Sing was selected as the opening film of the 14th Asiana International Short Film Festival in Seoul.

== Notes ==
1. Zsófia Szamosi received the award for her roles in Sing and Strangled (orig.: A martfűi rém).
