= Kenny Easterday =

American amputee (1973–2016)

- Born: Kenneth Easterday; December 7, 1973; Pittsburgh, Pennsylvania, U.S.
- Died: February 12, 2016 (aged 42); Aliquippa, Pennsylvania, U.S.
- Cause of death: Complications from sacral agenesis
- Other names: The Man with Half a Body
- Education: New Horizon School
- Spouse: Sarah Easterday 1992 (m. 1994, divorced)

Kenneth Easterday (December 7, 1973 – February 12, 2016) was an American man born with the rare disability, sacral agenesis. To improve his mobility, his legs were amputated at the hip when he was just six months old.

== Life and career ==
He was born in Aliquippa, Pennsylvania. The amputations took place in two stages. The first amputation surgery took Easterday's shin bones, which were used to replace his missing spinal column. At the time of Easterday's first amputation surgery he was only expected to live six months to one year. At six months of age, Easterday underwent a second and final amputation surgery, which involved amputating the rest of his remaining legs at the hips.

Easterday gained some notability following the 1988 release of the Canadian movie Kenny, in which he played a fictionalized version of himself.

He was a regular on The Jerry Springer Show in which he functioned as "The Messenger". He was also the focus of a 2010 TLC special titled The Man with Half a Body.

Easterday died on February 12, 2016, aged 42.
