= Karakara (film) =

2012 film

- Film poster
- Directed by: Claude Gagnon
- Written by: Claude Gagnon
- Produced by: Claude Gagnon; Samuel Gagnon; Takako Miyahira
- Starring: Gabriel Arcand; Youki Kudoh
- Cinematography: Michel St-Martin
- Edited by: Claude Gagnon
- Music by: Yukito Ara
- Production companies: Kukuru Vision; Zuno Films
- Distributed by: Mongrel Media
- Release date: August 31, 2012 (MWFF)
- Running time: 101 minutes
- Country: Canada
- Languages: English; French; Japanese

Karakara is a Canadian drama film, directed by Claude Gagnon and released in 2012. The film stars Gabriel Arcand as Pierre, a professor from Quebec who is on sabbatical in Okinawa to reevaluate his life after the death of his friend, and is drawn into a love affair with Junko (Youki Kudoh), a local woman fleeing an abusive husband who offers to be his tour guide.

The film's screenplay was partially inspired by Gagnon's own trip to Japan following the death of one of his closest friends. The film was shot in 2011, and premiered at the 2012 Montreal World Film Festival.

== Critical response ==
Writing for Variety, Ronnie Scheib noted that the film reversed "the usual Westerner-in-the-Orient stereotype, where the ambitious hero learns to slow down and smell the roses. Here he’s dragged, kicking and screaming, out of the rose garden and into the world at large."

For the Montreal Gazette, Brendan Kelly praised both Arcand's and Kudoh's performances, but wrote that he had difficulty believing in the core relationship between the characters. He ultimately concluded that "maybe it's uneven but it still remains a film that stays with you long after the final credits roll."

== Awards ==
At the MWFF, the film won the festival's Most Popular Canadian Film and Openness to the World awards. The film received two Prix Jutra nominations at the 15th Jutra Awards in 2013, for Best Actor (Arcand) and Best Screenplay (Gagnon).
