= Tamás Jordán =

Hungarian actor

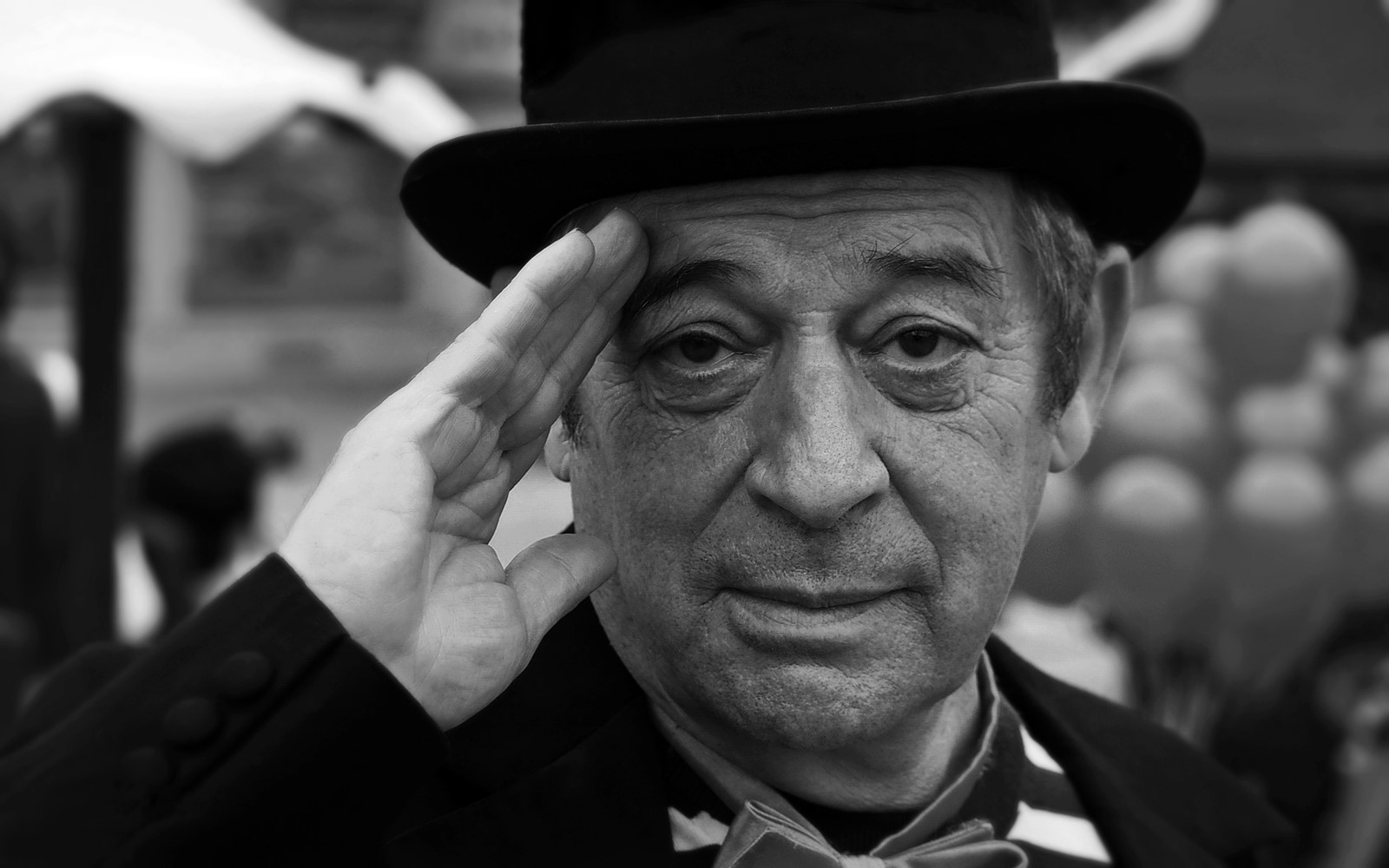
- Born: 15 January 1943 (age 82); Budapest, Hungary
- Occupation: Actor
- Years active: 1969-present

Tamás Jordán (born 15 January 1943) is a Hungarian actor. Jordán appeared in more than ninety films since 1969.

== Selected filmography ==
Year	Title	Role	Notes
1982	Macbeth		
1990	Good Evening, Mr. Wallenberg		
1992	Sweet Emma, Dear Böbe		
1993	We Never Die	Vigéc	
1996	Samba		
2006	Children of Glory	Karcsi's granddad	
2014	Free Fall		
2022	The Grandson	Grandfather	
