= Claude Gagnon =

Canadian filmmaker (b. 1949)

- Born: 18 December 1949 (age 76); Saint-Hyacinthe, Quebec, Canada
- Occupations: Film director, screenwriter, editor, actor
- Spouse: Yuri Yoshimura-Gagnon

Claude Gagnon (French pronunciation: [klod ɡaɲɔ̃]; born 18 December 1949) is a Canadian filmmaker and actor, who frequently works in both Canada and Japan.

== Early life ==
A Quebec native, Gagnon first came to Japan in 1970 as photojournalist covering Expo '70 in Osaka. He met his wife, ballerina-turned-filmmaker Yuri Yoshimura, whom he married in 1973.

"My original plan was to spend six months in Japan, and then to go to Indonesia before heading to Europe. I thought I’d do my little trip like everyone else did in those days. But after six months I still didn’t understand a thing. There were very few foreigners living in Japan in those days, and I remember that if you saw a Westerner in Kyoto, you’d crossed the road to say hi and trade phone numbers. It was the era of “Peace and Love”‒‒euphoric and stimulating."

== Career ==
Gagnon's introduction to the film industry was as an actor, notably playing a villain in the Sonny Chiba martial arts film Return of the Street Fighter (1974).

He made his directorial debut with 1979's Keiko, a neorealist-inspired lesbian-themed drama. The film was a popular success and earned Gagnon the Directors Guild of Japan New Directors Award, the first foreign-born filmmaker to do so.

== Filmography ==
Year	Title	Notes
1979	Keiko	
1982	Larose, Pierrot and Luce	
1985	Pale Face	
1988	Kenny	
1991	The Pianist	
1995	Pour l'amour de Thomas	
2004	Revival Blues	
2005	Kamataki	
2012	Karakara	
2020	Old Buddies	

=== Acting roles ===
Year	Title	Role	Notes
1974	Return of the Street Fighter	Don Costello	
1976	Sister Street Fighter: Fifth Level Fist	Joe Spencer	
1977	Rashamen	Smith	

== Awards and nominations ==
Institution	Year	Category	Work	Result
Berlin International Film Festival	1988	UNICEF Award	Kenny	Won
Berlin International Film Festival	1988	CIFEJ Award	Kenny	Won
Berlin International Film Festival	2006	Crystal Award	Kamataki	Won
César Awards	1986	Best French-Language Film	Pale Face	Nominated
Directors Guild of Japan	1979	New Directors Award	Keiko	Won
Genie Awards	2000	Best Motion Picture	Winter Stories	Nominated
Hochi Film Awards	1979	Special Award	Keiko	Won
Mar del Plata International Film Festival	2006	Best Film (International Competition)	Kamataki	Nominated
Montreal World Film Festival	1985	Best Canadian Film	Pale Face	Won
Montreal World Film Festival	1987	Grand Prix des Amériques	Kenny	Won
Montreal World Film Festival	2005	Grand Prix des Amériques	Kamataki	Nominated
Montreal World Film Festival	2005	Prize of the Ecumenical Jury	Kamataki	Won
Montreal World Film Festival	2005	Best Director	Kamataki	Won
Montreal World Film Festival	2005	People's Choice Award	Kamataki	Won
Montreal World Film Festival	2005	FIPRESCI Prize	Kamataki	Won
Montreal World Film Festival	2005	Most Popular Canadian Feature Film	Kamataki	Won
Montreal World Film Festival	2012	Grand Prix des Amériques	Karakara	Nominated
Montreal World Film Festival	2012	Most Popular Canadian Feature Film	Karakara	Won
Montreal World Film Festival	2012	Openness to the World Award	Karakara	Won
Paris Film Festival	1988	Special Jury Prize	Kenny	Won
Prix Iris	2013	Best Screenplay	Karakara	Nominated
Prix Iris	2022	Public Prize	Old Buddies	Nominated
Tokyo International Film Festival	1991	Grand Prix	The Pianist	Nominated
