= Martfű =

- Town
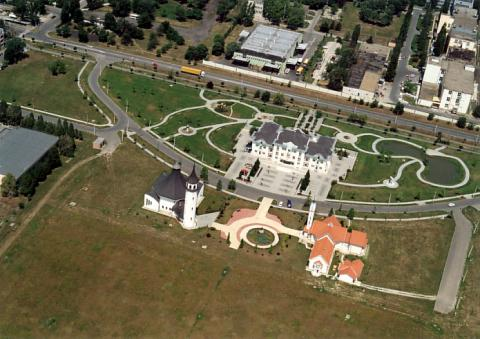
- Szent István Square

- Flag Coat of arms

- Location of Martfű
- Coordinates: 47°1′1″N 20°17′2″E
- Country: Hungary
- County: Jász-Nagykun-Szolnok
- District: Szolnok

Area
  - Total: 23.08 km^{2} (8.91 sq mi)

Population (2016)
  - Total: 6,237
  - Density: 319/km^{2} (830/sq mi)
- Time zone: UTC+1 (CET)
  - Summer (DST): UTC+2 (CEST)
- Postal code: 5435
- Area code: (+36) 56
- Website: martfu.hu

Martfű is a town in Jász-Nagykun-Szolnok county, in the Northern Great Plain region of central Hungary.

== Industry ==
The town is dominated by light industry, including the following:

- Tisza Shoe Factory: Though designed prior to the outbreak of war, in 1941–42, a factory was established by the Czechoslovak businessman Jan Antonin Bata, whose organization was based in Zlín. During the decades of the Kádár era, Tisza Cipő became the country's largest shoe manufacturer.
- Brewery: 1985, built by the surrounding businesses.
- Vegetable Oil Factory: built between 1976 and 1980. Primarily grown in the Great Plains sunflower, canola and soybean processing is carried out.
- Tisza Ipartelep plants: various industrial plants in the industrial and service center.

== Martfű Monster ==
The town is infamous for serial killer Péter Kovács, who is known as the Martfű Monster.

== International relations ==
Martfű is twinned with:

- Tuchów, Poland; since 1999
- Tăuții-Măgherăuș (Misztótfalu), Romania; since 2006

== Gallery ==
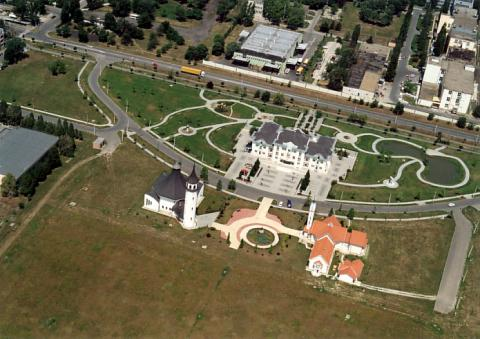
Aerial photography of Martfű

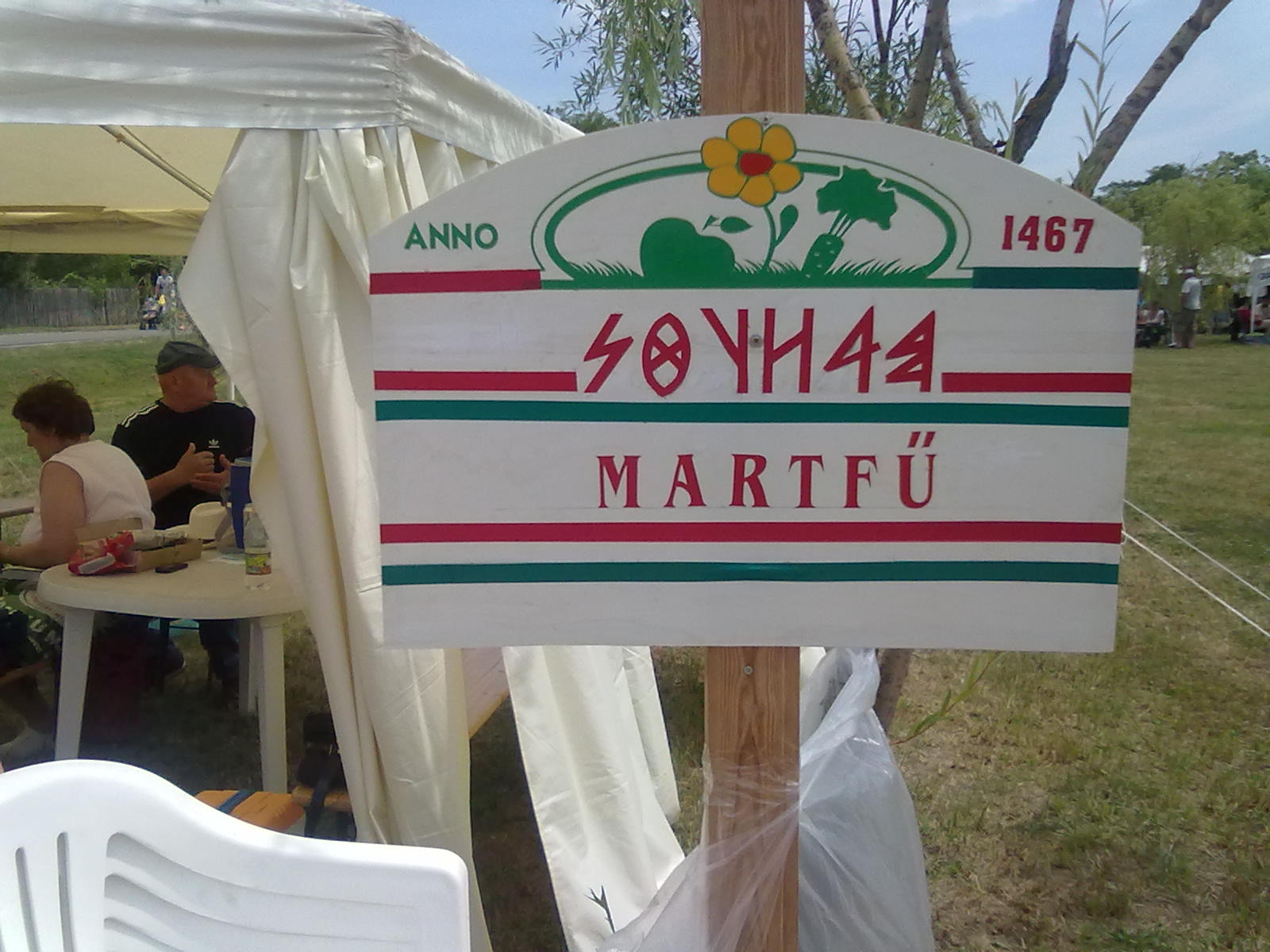
Martfű name written in Szekely-Hungarian script and Latin letters.

== Geography ==
Martfű covers an area of 23.08 km^{2} (9 sq mi) and has a population of 7366 people (2002).

== Sport ==
Martfűi LSE - association football team
