= Ann Ireland =

Canadian novelist (1953–2018)

- Born: May 19, 1953; Toronto, Ontario, Canada
- Died: August 23, 2018 (aged 65)
- Education: University of British Columbia
- Occupation: Author
- Writing career
- Language: English
- Notable awards: Seal First Novel Award; Governor General's Award (shortlisted); Rogers Writers' Trust Award (shortlisted)
- Website: www.annireland.ca

Ann Ireland (1953–2018) was a Canadian fiction author who published five novels between 1985 and 2018. Her first novel, A Certain Mr. Takahashi (1985), was the winner of the Seal $50,000 1st Novel Award. She also wrote 1996's The Instructor, which was shortlisted for the Trillium Book Award, and 2002's Exile, which was shortlisted for the 2002 Governor General's Awards and the Rogers Writers' Trust fiction prize.

== Life ==
Ireland was born in Toronto, Ontario. She studied at the University of British Columbia, from which she earned a BFA in creative writing in 1976. She is a past president of PEN Canada and for many years, up until the time of her death, was a writing instructor and the coordinator of the Writing Workshops Department at the Chang School of Continuing Education at Ryerson University (now Toronto Metropolitan University) in Toronto. Her 1985 novel, A Certain Mr. Takahashi, was the basis for the 1991 feature film The Pianist.

Her final novel, 2018's Where's Bob?, was published in May 2018, shortly before her death of carcinoid syndrome at the age of 65.

== Bibliography ==
Year	Title	Publisher	ISBN	Notes
1985	A Certain Mr. Takahashi	McClelland and Stewart	ISBN 0-7710-4363-5	Finalist, Books in Canada First Novel Award
1996	The Instructor	Doubleday	ISBN 0-385-25555-1	Finalist, Ontario Trillium Award. Nominated for Barnes and Noble "Discover these Great New Writers" Award.
2002	Exile	Dundurn Press	ISBN 1-55002-400-0	Fiction finalist, Governor General's Awards. Finalist for Rogers Writers' Trust Fiction Prize. Named by The Globe and Mail and Quill & Quire Magazine as a top book of the year.
2013	The Blue Guitar	Dundurn Press	ISBN 978-1-459-70-586-9	
2018	Where's Bob?	Biblioasis	ISBN 978-1771962278	
