= Old Buddies =

- French: Les Vieux chums
- Directed by: Claude Gagnon
- Screenplay by: Claude Gagnon
- Produced by: Bahija Essoussi-Gagnon; Claude Gagnon; Samuel Gagnon; Yuri Yoshimura-Gagnon
- Starring: Patrick Labbé; Paul Doucet
- Cinematography: Michel St-Martin
- Edited by: Claude Gagnon
- Music by: Daniel Toussaint
- Production company: Objectif 9
- Distributed by: Maison 4:3
- Release date: November 1, 2020 (FCIAT)
- Running time: 123 minutes
- Country: Canada
- Language: French

Old Buddies (French: Les Vieux chums) is a Canadian drama film, directed by Claude Gagnon and released in 2020. The film stars Patrick Labbé as Pierrot Joyal, a man returning to his hometown of Saint-Hyacinthe, Quebec, following several years of living in Morocco, to visit his family and friends after being diagnosed with terminal lung cancer, and Paul Doucet as Pierrot's childhood friend Jacques Larose, of whom Pierrot has a special request to help him end his life.

The cast also includes Luka Limoges, Marie-Pier Labrecque, Stéphan Côté, Luc Proulx, Natasha Kanapé Fontaine, Michel Olivier Girard, Geneviève Rochette and Pierre Curzi.

The film reunites the principal characters of Gagnon's 1982 film Larose, Pierrot and Luce (Larose, Pierrot et la Luce), although Gagnon stated that it was intended as a standalone film rather than a sequel or a remake. It was based on his own experiences spending time with his childhood friend Luc Matte, who had played Pierrot in the earlier film, in the year prior to Matte's death.

The film premiered on November 1, 2020 at the Abitibi-Témiscamingue International Film Festival, before premiering commercially on May 21, 2021.
