= Betrayal (1993 film) =

1993 Romanian film directed by RaduMihăileanu

Betrayal ( Trahir) is a 1993 Romanian film directed by Radu Mihăileanu. It won Grand Prix des Amériques, the main prize as well as three additional prizes at the Montreal World Film Festival.
