= Strangled (film) =

- Poster
- A martfűi rém
- Directed by: Árpád Sopsits
- Starring: Károly Hajduk; Mónika Balsai; Péter Bárnai; Zsolt Anger; Zsolt Trill; Gábor Jászberényi; Zsófia Szamosi
- Release dates: October 9, 2016 (Warsaw Film Festival); November 10, 2016 (Hungary)
- Running time: 121 minutes
- Country: Hungary
- Language: Hungarian

Strangled (Hungarian: A martfűi rém, lit. 'The Martfű monster') is a 2016 Hungarian neo-noir crime film directed by Árpád Sopsits. It stars Zsolt Anger, Mónika Balsai, and Zsófia Szamosi. The film was adapted from the story of a serial killer in Hungary 1960s, under the rule of the communist party.
