= Pale Face (film) =

- French: Visage pâle
- Directed by: Claude Gagnon
- Written by: Claude Gagnon
- Produced by: Yuri Yoshimura-Gagnon; Claude Gagnon
- Starring: Luc Matte; Allison Odjig
- Cinematography: Serge Ladouceur
- Edited by: Claude Gagnon
- Music by: Jérôme Langlois
- Production company: Yoshimura-Gagnon
- Release date: August 29, 1985 (FFM)
- Running time: 102 minutes
- Country: Canada
- Language: French

Pale Face (French: Visage pâle) is a Canadian drama film, directed by Claude Gagnon and released in 1985. The film stars Luc Matte as Claude "C.H." Hébert, a former hockey player turned coach who takes a camping trip in the wilderness; when he is physically attacked by a group of backwoods residents (Guy Thauvette, Gilbert Sicotte and Marcel Leboeuf), he is defended by Peter (Denis Lacroix), a First Nations man who is killed in the altercation. Peter's sister Marie (Allison Odjig) subsequently shelters him on the nearby reserve, despite her grief over her brother's death and her history of distrust of white people.

The cast also includes Josie Mathias, Christine Séguin, Louise Richer, Claude Desjardins, Angèle Matte, Cécile Mathias, Michel David, Claudette Lapierre and Christian Talbot in supporting roles.

== Distribution ==
The film premiered at the 1985 Montreal World Film Festival, and went into commercial release in October 1985.

It was also screened at the 1985 Toronto International Film Festival, and at the 1986 Berlin Film Festival.

== Critical response ==
Bruce Bailey of the Montreal Gazette wrote that "there's nothing particularly wrong with the acting here. Indeed, screen newcomer Allison Odjig (an Ottawa civil servant) is believable as the native woman. In any other hands, her pivotal speech about Indian grievances would have come off as unduly preachy. And there are also some deftly-handed sequences here and there - notably those in which the bozos from the bush taunt C.H. with a veiled viciousness reminiscent of what we get in Harold Pinter's so-called Theatre of Menace. But in the end, Gagnon's script gets rather tedious and silly. It's even downright laughable at times when the fugitive from justice starts staging his own Hockey Nights in Canada on a wilderness pond."

For the Ottawa Citizen, David McDonald wrote that the film's narrative setup played like a cross between Death Weekend and Deliverance, while the relationship between Claude and Marie settled into "the romanticized theme that in the wilderness - in the past - the white man, out of necessity, learned from the Indians the art of survival. Having learned to survive, the white man was then in a position to conquer and destroy - and forget."

== Awards ==
At FFM, it won the award for Best Canadian Film.

It was one of the five finalists for the Prix L.-E.-Ouimet-Molson for 1985.
