= The Bigger Picture (film) =

2014 film

- Film poster
- Directed by: Daisy Jacobs
- Written by: Jennifer Majka; Daisy Jacobs
- Produced by: Chris Hees
- Starring: Anne Cunningham
- Cinematography: Max Williams
- Edited by: Vera Simmonds
- Music by: Huw Bunford
- Production company: National Film and Television School
- Distributed by: Omeleto
- Release date: 21 May 2014 (Cannes)
- Running time: 8 minutes
- Country: United Kingdom
- Language: English

The Bigger Picture is a 2014 British animated short film directed by Daisy Jacobs. It was nominated for the Academy Award for Best Animated Short Film at the 87th Academy Awards. It won the BAFTA Award for Best Short Animation at the 68th British Academy Film Awards.

The film is about two sons who are ambivalent about taking care of their aging mother and was made by combining 2D painted art and life-size puppetry, animated in life-size sets.

== Cast ==
- Anne Cunningham as Mother
- Christopher Nightingale as Nick
- Alisdair Simpson as Richard

== Awards and nominations ==
Award	Category	Recipients/Nominees	Result	Ref.
87th Academy Awards	Best Animated Short Film	Daisy Jacobs and Chris Hees	Nominated	
68th British Academy Film Awards	Best British Short Animation	Chris Hees, Daisy Jacobs and Jennifer Majka	Won	
Annecy International Animated Film Festival	Best Graduation Film	Daisy Jacobs	Won	
Cannes Film Festival	Cinefondation Award	Daisy Jacobs	Nominated	
Edinburgh International Film Festival	Creative Innovation in a Short Film	Daisy Jacobs	Won	
Edinburgh International Film Festival	Best New British Animation	Daisy Jacobs	Nominated	
Friss Hús Budapest International Short Film Festival	Best International Short Film	Daisy Jacobs	Won	
Hamptons International Film Festival	Golden Starfish Award	Daisy Jacobs	Nominated	
Hiroshima International Animation Festival	Grand Prize	Daisy Jacobs	Won	
