= The Pianist (1991 film) =

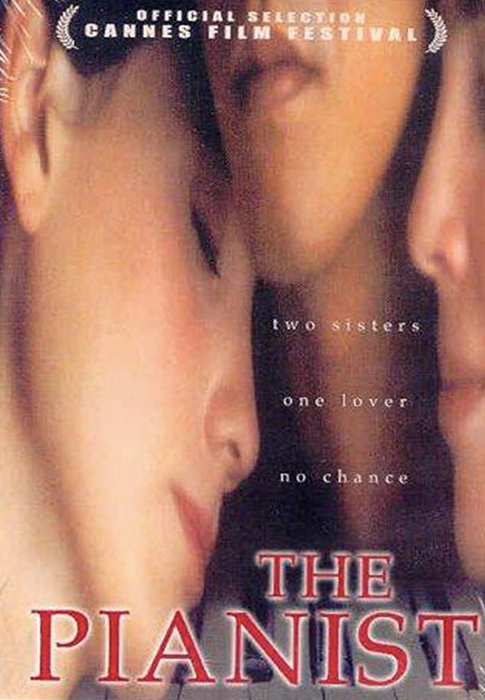
- Film poster
- Directed by: Claude Gagnon
- Screenplay by: Claude Gagnon
- Based on: A Certain Mr. Takahashi by Ann Ireland
- Produced by: Yuri Yoshimura-Gagnon; Claude Gagnon
- Starring: Gail Travers; Macha Grenon; Eiji Okuda
- Cinematography: Sylvain Brault
- Edited by: André Corriveau
- Music by: André Gagnon
- Release date: 1991
- Running time: 112 minutes
- Country: Canada
- Language: English

The Pianist is a 1991 Canadian drama film written and directed by Claude Gagnon. It is based on the novel A Certain Mr. Takahashi by Ann Ireland. The central premise of the film - in which two teenage girls develop a crush on, and begin stalking, a celebrated concert pianist - is very similar to the 1964 film The World of Henry Orient.

== Plot ==
A newly arrived celebrated Japanese pianist, Takahashi, is spied on by two teenage neighbor sisters, Jean and Colette. A family reunion to announce that the parents will be managing an institution in China recalls their experiences in attempting to meet him, then interacting with him in a supposedly one time sexual experience — a ménage à trois. The father of the sisters imitates Colette is unaware that Jean has seen her at a New York City night club dancing with him. Colette visited Jean in New York and makes explorations of the city on her own. Takahashi is to sign posters at an event in Vancouver where the parents of the sisters have relocated. Colette does not want to go to the signing on the reasoning that they all have changed. Colette comes clean that she has slept with him and does not want him to know that she is aware of their trysts. A former boyfriend of the sister's mother attends the reunion, and Jean has a tryst with him during the banquet. They go to the poster signing, are welcomed by him and invited to lunch. Following the lunch, he makes his goodbyes to the sisters and Colette indicates to him that they are still friends. His limousine drives away.

== Cast ==
- Gail Travers as Jean
- Macha Grenon as Colette
- Eiji Okuda as Takahashi
- Dorothée Berryman as Samantha
- Maury Chaykin as Cody
- Ralph Allison as Martin
- Carl Alacchi as Narrator
