= Millennium Pictures =

Millennium Pictures Pty Limited is a film and media production company based in Rosewood, NSW, Australia and run by Posie Graeme-Evans and her husband.

== Works ==
- The Miraculous Mellops (1991–1992)
- Mirror, Mirror (1995)
- McLeod's Daughters (1996)
- Doom Runners (1997)
- Mirror, Mirror II (1997)
