= Tisza Cipő =

Brand of Hungarian sports shoes

Logo of Tisza Cipő

Tisza Cipő (Hungarian for Tisza Shoe) is a brand of Hungarian sports shoes that exists since Communist era, and has made a resurgence in recent years as a hip new fashion brand in that country. "Cipő" is Hungarian for "shoe," and Tisza is a river in Central Europe. The shoes in playful colors and designs are featured on the company's web site.

== History ==
In the 1930s, Thomas Bata came to Hungary to open a shoe factory somewhere in the country. During a journey he visited Martfű where the railway, public and water traffic meet, and he found it suitable for the Tisza Cipő factory. He bought the parcel in 1939, which was 593 cadastral hold, and he paid, 325000 pengő for it. The construction begun and the Cikta Rt., which was the former name of the shoe factory, started the production of loungers in 1942.

During the Second World War many things changed in the factory, directors of the factory frequently alternated, however; the Shoe factory never shut down. After the war, the factory suffered many losses, for instance; wooden treaded shoes were manufactured instead of the rubber ones. In August 1949, The Cikta Rt. was renamed to Tisza Cipő Nemzeti Vállalat (Tisza Shoe National Corporation).

During the 1950s and 1960s, the factory produced shoes for the inner market and exported only to socialist countries. At these times, they produced a large quantity of boots for the Ministry of Interior, the Ministry of Defense and the Civil Guard. In December 1970, The Tisza Shoe Factory wanted a new logo instead of their old one, and then they put in the application for the authorisation of their new logo, which they obtained in the first months of 1971. Finally, the Tisza company started to produce sport shoes, which very soon became one of the favourite shoes of the youth. Many facts show us that the production of sport shoes was a very good decision. For instance, from May 1971 the German Adidas manufactured its football shoes called La Paz in the Tisza factory. From the beginning of the 1970s many new models came to light, some of them were very similar to today's old school type of shoes. One of the first shoes, which the Tisza Factory produced, was a rubber sole – vulcanized – gym shoes which were manufactured in many colours. The variety of sport shoes is widened and besides the normal shoes long-legged style shoes were produced and also different shoes were produced leather and linen for different sport activities.

At that time the Tisza factory was the biggest shoe factory in Hungary-where not only shoes were manufactured but other factories rubber soles. They produced 10,000,000 pairs of shoes annually and 3,000,000 of them were gym shoes. Besides the quantity, the factory took care of the quality. In July 1970, the gym shoes which sole were made of PVC won the excellent product prize. The shoes profited very well, in 1975 the export value of the brand exceeded 2 million 300 thousand dollars, and Tisza accounted for one fifth of the total Hungarian shoe exports to the Western countries. At the 1976 Budapest International Fair, the Tisza leisure shoe family won the Fair's prize. 1976 brought several international successes for the Tisza Cipő factory. For instance, the French ADIDAS signed a multi-year contract with them and the factory's production appeared on the English market. At the same year an agreement was made on the first American export were not only casual shoes were ordered but 50 thousands sport shoes. Tisza shoe company also produced 2 million pairs of shoes for the socialist market. In the 1970s, the Tisza shoe company's products reached the Kuwait's and Liberia's markets. 1976 brought further development.

In the 1990s, the import increased and more and more brands could get into the domestic market. Until the middle of the 1990s, the Tisza Shoe factory made sport shoes and after that, it started manufacturing street shoes for women, men and children. From the summer of 2003 the Tisza company has again started to produce sport shoes. Besides the old models, they produce new ones.

== Clash Kft ==
In 2003, The Clash Kft has bought the rights of the usage of the Tisza trademark. This means that The Clash company can use Tisza as a trademark and shoes can be produced anywhere, not just in the traditional Tisza Shoe Factory in Martfű. Nowadays, there are three places where Tisza shoes are produced and six shops where customers can buy them. The Clash company also wants to have Tisza trademark to produce shoes only in Hungary, although the cost of production is very expensive. The marketing aim of the Clash Kft. is a long-live company, in order to achieve this they have worked out a special marketing plan; the expansion of the company is very slow and the profit of which the company gathers a year is given back to its origin, to develop the company. The Clash Kft also makes clothes and accessories. The idea of the whole business came from László Vidák, who was also an importer of a very popular shoe in Hungary a couple of years ago.

== Clash Kft and The Tisza Shoe ==
In May 2009 the original Tisza Company in Martfű went bankrupt; from the 102 employees 85 quit. But the Clash Kft continues to make the Tisza Shoe.. The company factory has made a move away from traditional shoe shops and sells its products only in its own specialty stores. In 2018, the company had six stores nationwide: two in the capital, one each in Győr, Pécs, Szeged and Siófok. Tisza also entered the market with clothing and accessories. The former consists mainly of retro clothes, while the latter mainly of socks, hats, scarves and bags. These are characterised by understated elegance and prestigious branding.

Tisza's sub-brand, Tisza Budapest, was created in 2014.

In 2021, the management managed to settle a ten-year ownership dispute that had limited production until then, and only then could the brand begin to become popular again. As promised the companies first international shop opened in Tokyo the next day.

In 2022 they collaborated with Magnum, and in 2023 with Sport. The shoes' popularity was helped by the fact that they were worn by celebrities such as Pedro Pascal, which got nationwide attention that year.

In 2024 Tisza had a collaboration with a Hungarian popstar Azahriah, where people reportedly waited in line for 15 hours in rain for the shoe.

== Links ==
- Tisza Cipő official website (in Hungarian)
- Minden időben, Tisza cipőben! (in Hungarian)
