= The Caretaker's Lodge =

- French: La Conciergerie
- Directed by: Michel Poulette
- Written by: Benoît Dutrizac; Michel Poulette
- Produced by: Christian Larouche; Luc Vandal
- Starring: Serge Dupire; Macha Grenon; Jacques Godin
- Cinematography: Yves Bélanger
- Edited by: Éric Drouin
- Music by: Jean-Marie Benoît
- Production company: Cinépix
- Release date: August 26, 1997 (FFM)
- Running time: 101 minutes
- Country: Canada
- Language: French

The Caretaker's Lodge (French: La Conciergerie) is a Canadian drama film, directed by Michel Poulette and released in 1997. The film stars Serge Dupire as Jacques Laniel, a police officer who quits the force to become a private detective so that he can investigate and solve the murder of his former police partner Thomas Colin (Jacques Godin).

The cast also includes Macha Grenon, Monique Spaziani, Tania Kontoyanni, Jean-René Ouellet, Michel Forget, Raymond Cloutier, Paul Dion, Carl Béchard, Maka Kotto, Dorothée Berryman, Marie-Claude Lefebvre, Isabel Richer, David La Haye, Eric Cabana, Lenie Scoffié, Paul Buissonneau, Caroline Néron, JiCi Lauzon, Guy Provost, Andrée Champagne, Claude Léveillée and Bianca Gervais in supporting roles.

The screenplay was written by Poulette and journalist and crime novelist Benoît Dutrizac.

The film premiered at the 1997 Montreal World Film Festival, where it won the award for Best Canadian Film.

Marcel Pothier, Guy Francoeur, Antoine Morin, Viateur Paiement and Myriam Poirier received a Genie Award nomination for Best Sound Editing at the 18th Genie Awards in 1998.
