= Abandoned (2001 film) =

2001 film by Arpád Sopsits

- Torzók
- Directed by: Árpád Sopsits
- Written by: Árpád Sopsits
- Produced by: Ferenc Kardos; László Kántor
- Starring: Tamás Mészáros; Szabolcs Csizmadia; Attila Zsilák; Péter Müller
- Cinematography: Péter Szatmári
- Edited by: Béla Barsi
- Music by: Tamás Görgényi; Peter Pejtsik
- Release date: 1 February 2001 (Hungarian Film Week)
- Running time: 100 minutes
- Country: Hungary
- Language: Hungarian

Abandoned (Hungarian: Torzók) is a 2001 Hungarian film written and directed by Árpád Sopsits. It was Hungary's submission to the 74th Academy Awards for the Academy Award for Best Foreign Language Film, but was not accepted as a nominee.

== Plot ==
Abandoned at an orphanage by his recently divorced father, Aron endures a life full of cruelty and despair, punctuated by beating from the orphanage staff and ridicule from the other boys. His only friend is his classmate Attila, who helps him discover love and gives him strength to fight back.

== See also ==
- Cinema of Hungary
- List of submissions to the 74th Academy Awards for Best Foreign Language Film
