= Curtiz (film) =

2018 film

- CURTIZ – A magyar, aki felforgatta Hollywoodot
- Directed by: Tamás Yvan Topolánszky
- Written by: Zsuzsanna Bak
- Produced by: Tamás Yvan Topolánszky; Claudia Sümeghy; Barnabas Hutlassa
- Starring: Ferenc Lengyel, Evelin Dobos
- Cinematography: Zoltán Dévényi
- Edited by: Eszter Bodoky
- Music by: Gábor Subicz
- Release dates: 1 September 2018 (Montréal World Film Festival); 2020 (Netflix)
- Country: Hungary
- Language: Hungarian / English

Curtiz is a 2018 Hungarian film by Tamás Yvan Topolánszky, based on the making of the 1942 Humphrey Bogart film Casablanca by Hungarian director Michael Curtiz.

That year, America had just entered World War II. Michael Curtiz filmed his iconic multi-Oscar-winning film Casablanca under most unusual circumstances. During the shoot, he had to battle almost daily with political censors who wanted to change the film's script. In addition, Curtiz's troubled relationship with his daughter made this period more difficult for him.

The 2018 film's producers were Tamás Yvan Topolánszky, Claudia Sümeghy, and Barnabas Hutlassa. The Executive Producer was Orian Williams, and the screenwriter was Zsuzsanna Bak.

== Plot ==
The film tells the story of the first Hungarian Academy Award winner, Michael Curtiz (originally known as Mihály Kertész), who won the Best Director Oscar for Casablanca, a romantic film that film critics consider to be one of the best in film history. Curtiz, who is credited with nearly 200 films, was a highly controversial, aggressive, womanizing, selfish, violent and crude personality.

The film about him (the original full Hungarian title is Curtiz – A magyar, aki felforgatta Hollywoodot) was originally made as a TV movie. Its story takes place in 1942, during the filming of Casablanca, when the Japanese had destroyed Pearl Harbor, the Germans had already started bombing the British, and the United States had just entered World War II. Curtiz, meanwhile, could not decide how to finish Casablanca, rewriting the script over and over again as the shooting neared. To make matters worse, to promote war propaganda as much as possible, the state authorities appoint a political official to supervise the film in progress, who tries to pressure Curtiz into making changes to the storyline. In defiance of these political interventions, Curtiz is determined to make his film a success, but he also faces serious family tensions during the shoot. The endangerment of his sister, who has stayed in Hungary, and his troubled relationship with his daughter, who has emerged after a long period of absence, take unexpected turns during the filming of the movie.

The story of the film is based on real events, with dramatized elements. The filmmakers have created the film with the help of a wealth of anecdotes and memoirs. Screenwriter Zsuzsanna Bak said that the story of the film covers 85 percent of the original events.

== Cast ==
- Ferenc Lengyel --- Michael Curtiz
- Evelin Dobos --- Kitty
- Declan Hannigan --- Mr. Johnson
- Scott Alexander Young --- Hal B. Wallis
- Joseph Gyabronka --- S.Z. Sakall
- Nikolett Barabas --- Bess
- Yan Feldman --- Julius Epstein
- Rafael Feldman --- Philip Epstein
- Christopher Krieg --- Conrad Veidt
- Andrew Hefler --- Jack L. Warner
- Ian O'Donnell --- Claude Rains / Captain Louis Renault (voice)
- Lili Bordán --- Irene Lee
- Caroline Boulton --- Louise Fazenda
- Eszter Nagy-Kálózy --- Margit (voice)
- Jeremy Wheeler --- Government Official No. 1

== Awards ==
- It won the Grand Prix des Amériques at the Montreal World Film Festival in 2018. The lead role is played by Ferenc Lengyel, opposite Evelin Dobos.
- At the Riviera International Film Festival, Topolánszky was awarded the prize for Best Film Director.
- At the Boston International Film Festival, Zoltán Dévényi won the Best Cinematography award.

== Release ==
=== Canada ===
1 September 2018 (Montreal World Film Festival)

2 February 2019 (Pendance Film Festival, Toronto)

=== USA ===
5 April 2019 (Phoenix Film Festival)

15 March 2020 (Boston International Film Festival)

=== Italy ===
8 May 2019 (Riviera International Film Festival, Sestri Levante)

=== Hungary ===
12 September 2019

=== Poland ===
11 November 2019 (Camerimage International Film Festival, Torun)

=== Netflix ===
Added to Netflix worldwide on March 25, 2020 for two years with it removed on March 25, 2022.

=== China ===
9 May 2022. (CCTV6)
