= Keiko (film) =

- Film poster
- Directed by: Claude Gagnon
- Written by: Claude Gagnon
- Produced by: Claude Gagnon
- Starring: Junko Wakashiba; Akiko Kitamura
- Cinematography: André Pelletier
- Edited by: Claude Gagnon
- Music by: Jun Fukamachi
- Distributed by: ATG
- Release date: 17 November 1979 (Japan)
- Running time: 119 minutes
- Country: Japan
- Language: Japanese

Keiko is a 1979 Japanese film directed by Claude Gagnon. It won the Special Award at the 1979 Hochi Film Awards.

== Cast ==
- Junko Wakashiba as Keiko
- Akiko Kitamura as Kazuyo
- Takuma Ikeuchi as Masaru
- Toshio Hashimoto as Terayama
- Nobuo Nakanishi as Noguchi

== See also ==
- List of lesbian, gay, bisexual or transgender-related films
