= Árpád Sopsits =

Hungarian film director (1952–2025)

- Born: 2 May 1952; Szeged, Hungary
- Died: 6 March 2025 (aged 72)
- Education: University of Debrecen Academy of Drama and Film in Budapest Institute of Philosophy at Semmelweis University
- Occupations: film director, screenwriter
- Awards: Bergamo Film Meeting (1990, 2002) Chicago International Film Festival, Gold Hugo (1990, 2001) Montréal World Film Festival, Grand Prix des Amériques (2001) Montréal World Film Festival, Prize of the Ecumenical Jury (2001) Prix Europa, Prix Europa Special (2001)

Árpád Sopsits (2 May 1952 – 6 March 2025) was a Hungarian theatre and film director and screenwriter. In 1994 he won the Béla Balázs Award.

== Life and career ==
Sopsits started his studies at the Faculty of Humanities of the University of Debrecen, Cours of Folk Culture and Library. Between 1975 and 1979 he studied directing at the Academy of Drama and Film in Buadapest the class of Károly Makk. From 1974 he worked at the Institute of Philosophy at Semmelweis University, and later as a scriptwriter for Mafilm. In 1994 he was awarded the Béla Balázs Prize.

He worked at the Budapesti Kamaraszínház (2001–2004, 2008, 2011), the Gyulai Várszínház (2002, 2010), the Új Színház (2003), the Szabadkai Népszínház (2005), the National Theatre (2006, 2009), the Merlin Theatre (2011), the Vígszínház (2012) and at the Szekszárdi Német Színház (2013).

Sopsits died on 6 March 2025, at the age of 72.

== Theatrical works ==
A number of performances are registered in the Színházi Adattár; as author: 5, as actor: 2, as director: 19; as set designer: 9; as costume designer: 2.

=== Author ===
- Sopsits: Dosztojevszkij: Bűn és bűnhődés a rácsok mögött (2001)
- Gogol-Sopsits: Egy őrült naplója (2003)
- Brestyánszki-Sopsits: Álomlakó (2005)
- Sopsits: Fekete angyal (2008)
- Gyulay-Sopsits: Psyché (2010)
- Sopsits: Die Verwandlung (2013)

=== Actor ===
- Brestyánszki-Sopsits: Álomlakó....Aranyarc
- Barfuss: Szüleink szexuális neurózisai, avagy Dora élettörténete....Dora apja

=== Director, designer ===
Designer means: scenographer (s) or/and costume designer (cd)

- Sposits: Dosztojevszkij: Bűn és bűnhődés a rácsok mögött (2001) (cd)
- William Shakespeare: Falstaff (IV. Henrik) (2002)
- Ghelderode: Kószál a nagy kaszás (2002)
- Gogol-Sopsits: Egy őrült naplója (2003) (s, cd)
- Shepard: Hazug képzelet (2003)
- Büchner: A létező (2004)
- Büchner: Woyzeck (2004)
- Brestyánszki-Sopsits: Álomlakó (2005) (s)
- Szophoklész: Oidipusz király (2006)
- Szophoklész: Oidipusz Kolónoszban (2006)
- Sopsits: Fekete angyal (2008) (s, cd)
- Williams: Orpheusz alászáll (2009)
- Gyulay-Sopsits: Psyché (2010) (s)
- Barfuss: Szüleink szexuális neurózisai, avagy Dora élettörténete (2011) (s)
- Marber: Közelebb! (Closer) (2011) (s)
- Oksanen: Tisztogatás (2011)
- Esterházy Péter: Csokonai Lili – Tizenhét hattyúk (2012)
- Kafka: Die Verwandlung (2013) (s)

== Filmography ==
- Szabadjegy a bombatölcsérbe (1978)
- Niagara Nagykávéház (1980)
- Céllövölde (1990)
- Video Blues (1992)
- Félelem és reszketés (1994)
- Rítus (1995)
- Derengő (1996)
- Légyfogó (1998)
- A negatív ember (1998)
- Abandoned (Torzók) (2001)
- Tálentum (2001)
- Harasztÿ István (2003)
- Ritmusok (2004)
- Forgás (2005)
- Kocsmakoncert (2006)
- A hetedik kör (2008)
- Strangled (A martfűi rém) (2016)

== Awards ==
=== Showing all 17 wins and 3 nominations ===
==== Annonay International Festival of films ====
1991	Winner Special Mention	Céllövölde (1990)

==== Bergamo Film Meeting ====
2002	Winner Silver Rosa Camuna	Abandoned / Torzók (2001)
1990	Winner Bronze Rosa Camuna	Céllövölde (1990) Tied with Warten in der Dämmerung (1989) and _Gorod Zero (1988)_.

==== Annonay International Festival of First films ====
2002	Winner Camério	Best Film Torzók (2001)
2002	Winner Camério	Best Screenplay Torzók (2001)
2002	Winner C.I.F.E.J. Award	Torzók (2001)

==== Castellinaria International Festival of Young Cinema ====
2002	Winner Environment and Health Award	Torzók (2001)

==== Chicago International Film Festival ====
2001	Nominee Gold Hugo	Best Feature Torzók (2001)
1990	Nominee Gold Hugo	Best Feature Céllövölde (1990)

==== Hungarian Film Critics Awards ====
2002	Winner Film Critics Award	Best Director Torzók (2001)

==== Hungarian Film Week ====
2017	Winner Best Visual Design	Best Production Design A martfüi rém (2016) Shared with: Rita Dévényi
2017	Winner Best Director	Long Feature Competition A martfüi rém (2016)
2017	Winner Best Director	Long Feature Competition A martfüi rém (2016) ( (feature film))
2017	Winner Best Production Design	Best Production Design A martfüi rém (2016) Shared with: Rita Dévényi (production designer)
2001	Winner Best Director	Torzók (2001)

==== Locarno International Film Festival ====
1992	Nominee Golden Leopard	Video Blues (1992)

==== Montréal World Film Festival ====
Winner Grand Prix des Amériques	Torzók (2001) Tied with Baran (2001).
Winner Prize of the Ecumenical Jury	Torzók (2001)

==== Parma International Music Film Festival, IT ====
2017	Winner Silver Violet (Violetta dArgento)	Best Film A martfüi rém (2016)

==== Prix Europa ====
2001	Winner Prix Europa Special	TV Fiction Torzók (2001) Shared with: László Kántor Péter Szatmári

== Bibliography ==
- MTI Who's Who 2009. Ed. Péter Hermann. Budapest: MTI. 2008. ISBN 978-963-1787-283
