= Kristóf Deák =

Hungarian film director, screenwriter, film producer and editor

- Born: 7 June 1982 (age 43); Budapest, Hungary
- Occupation: Film director
- Years active: 2010–present
- Notable work: Sing (Mindenki)

Kristóf Deák (Hungarian pronunciation: [ˈkriʃtoːf ˈdɛaːk]; born June 7, 1982) is a Hungarian film director, screenwriter, film producer and editor who is best known for his work on Sing, which earned him critical appraisal and recognition including the Academy Award for Best Live Action Short Film at the 89th Academy Awards in 2017.

== Life ==
Starting his studies in electrical engineering at the Budapest University of Technology and Economics, he later switched to the University of Theater and Film's film production course. During this time, he learned editing from his classmates, and subsequently worked as a freelance editor. In 2010, he completed the MA in Film and TV Directing course at the University of Westminster.

In 2011, he directed episodes of the popular Hungarian television series Hacktion.

In 2017, his short film Sing won the Academy Award for Best Live Action Short Film.

== Filmography ==
| Year | Title | Country | Genre/type | Director | Screenwriter | Other |
|---|---|---|---|---|---|---|
| 2022 | The Grandson | Hungary | Action | Yes | Yes | |
| 2016 | Sing (Mindenki) | Hungary | Short | Yes | Yes | Producer |
| 2015 | Beverley | UK | Short | | | Editor |
| 2014 | The Roof | UK | Short | | | Editor |
| 2013 | The Hummingbird | Spain-UK | Short | | | Editor |
| 2013 | The UnDream | UK | Short | | | Editor, assistant director |
| 2012 | The Boss | UK | Short | Yes | | Editor |
| 2012 | Losing It | UK | Short | Yes | | script editor, producer |
| 2010 | Golf with a Shotgun | UK | Short | Yes | Yes | script editor |

== Television ==
| Year | Title | Country | Genre/type | Director | Other |
|---|---|---|---|---|---|
| 2011–2012 | Hacktion | Hungary | TV series | Yes (12 episodes) | Editor (2 episodes) |

== Awards and honors ==
- Audience Award – 32nd Festival du Cinéma Européen de Lille (Sing, 2016)
- Audience Award – Festival Internacional de Cine Lanzarote (Sing, 2016)
- People's Choice Award – Toronto International Film Festival, TIFF Kids (Sing, 2016)
- Daazo.com Special Award – Budapest Friss Hús Fesztivál (Sing, 2016)
- Grand Prix and Best Short Award – International Competition – Short Shorts Film Festival & Asia (Sing, 2016)
- Audience Award – Sapporo Shortsfest, Japan (Sing, 2016)
- Adult Jury Prize—Live-action Short Film – 34th Chicago International Children's Film Festival (Sing, 2016)
- Best Short Fiction Film – 19th Olympia International Film Festival for Children and Young People (Sing, 2016)
- Best Short Film for Children 2nd Prize – Interfilm KUKI + TeenScreen Berlin (Sing, 2016)
- Lovas Nándor Award (for the best film plan on the pitchforum) – Friss Hús Festival (A legjobb játék, 2016)
- Academy Award for Best Live Action Short Film – 89th Academy Awards (Sing, 2016)
- Béla Balázs Award (2017)
