= Voro (author) =

Canadian comics creator, both artis and writer (born 1975)

VoRo
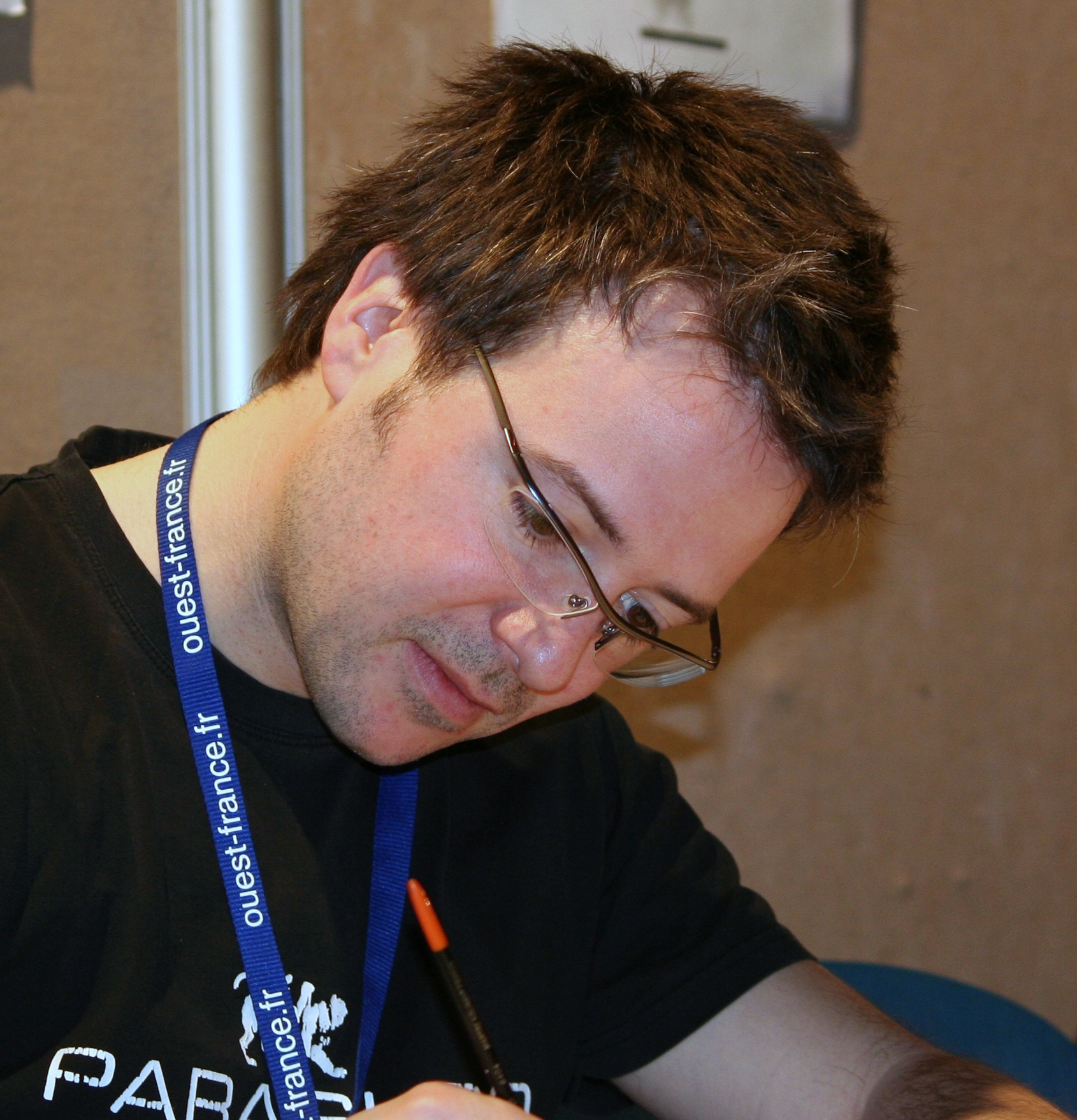
- VoRo at the Festival of Planks and Cows in Hérouville-Saint-Clair, France, in April 2009
- Born: Vincent Rioux; June 9, 1975 (age 50) Le Bic, Quebec, Canada
- Occupation: Screenwriter, comic book artist, comic book writer, colorist
- Language: French
- Education: Cégep de Rivière-du-Loup
- Years active: 2001 – present

VoRo (born Vincent Rioux on June 9, 1975) is a Canadian comic book creator (both artist and writer).

== Biography ==
VoRo earned a DCE in graphic design at the Cégep de Rivière-du-Loup in Rivière-du-Loup, Quebec. Several fanzines published him while he worked in a graphic-design workshop to finance a trip to Europe.

He left for Belgium where he spent a few months at the Institut Saint-Luc in Brussels to learn the basics of the cartoonist profession. However, VoRo returned to Quebec after spending a little over a year in Belgium.

He then produced an album, pre-published in the Quebec magazine Zine Zag, entitled La Mare au diable published by Éditions Mille-Îles, which won the Bédélys Québec Prize, the Réal-Fillion Prize from the Québec BD Festival and the BD Québec 2001 Grand Prize. The album was subsequently distributed in Europe by Les 400 coups France.

Then, VoRo worked on the project Tard dans la nuit published by Vents d'Ouest (three volumes), which he produced in collaboration with Djian, a French screenwriter and Jocelyne Charrance on color. The plot of the story is built around the controversy surrounding the Duplessis Orphans.

VoRo also produced L'été 63 in two volumes with Marc Bourgne on the screenplay. The first volume was released in June 2009 in Europe by Vents d'Ouest, and the second in 2012.

In 2017, VoRo was the lead illustrator on the collective historical work 1792 - À main levée, which traces the parliamentary history of Lower Canada.

In 2019, he produced the drawings for the album L'Espion de trop, which was released by Glénat Quebec, with the help of Frédéric Antoine (screenwriter) and Kamiken (colorist). The album received a favorable reception from the media.

== Publications ==
Albums

- La Mare au Diable (drawing and screenplay based on the novel of the same name by George Sand), Les 400 Coups, 2001.
- Tard dans la nuit, in three volumes: La révolte (2004), Ménage de printemps (2005), Les orphelins (2007) as illustrator and co-writer (screenplay by Djian, colors by Jocelyne Charrance), Vents d'Ouest
- Tard dans la nuit (complete), Vents d'Ouest, 2010
- L'été 63, in two volumes as illustrator and colourist, script by Marc Bourgne, Vents d'Ouest, 2009 and 2012.
- Un moment d'impatience !, 2014 (collective work for the benefit of an organization), Les Impatients.
- 1792 À main levée, 2017 (collective historical work), as principal illustrator (drawings and colours by Vincent Giard, drawings and screenplay by Réal Godbout, drawings by VAN, historical text by Christian Blais and Magali Paquin, ...), Quebec Publications.
- L'Espion de trop, 2019 as designer (screenplay by Frédéric Antoine, colors by Kamiken), Glénat Quebec.

== Distinctions ==
- Bédélys Prize (2001), awarded by the non-profit organization Promo 9e Art (Montreal);
- Bédéis Causa Prize (2001), awarded to the Quebec Francophone Comics Festival;
- BD Quebec Prize (2001), provided by the defunct information and news site on Quebec comics BD Québec.
- Prix Jovette-Bernier (2004)

== See also ==
- Quebec comics

== Bibliography ==
- Falardeau, Mira (2008). Histoire de la bande dessinée au Québec [History of Comics in Quebec]. Études québécoises (Quebec studies) (in French). Montreal, Quebec, Canada: VLB. ISBN 978-2-89649-011-0. OCLC 231835142. (Wikipedia article: History of Comics in Quebec; total number of pages: 192)
- (in French) Interview de VoRo sur La Fabrique culturelle [Interview with VoRo on La Fabrique culturelle] (video), March 2014
