= Quebec comics =

French language comic produced in Quebec

- Earliest publications: 19th century
- Publishers: Éditions Mille-Îles; La Pastèque; Mécanique Générale; Les 400 coups; Glénat Québec
- Publications: Croc; Safarir
- Creators: Albert Chartier; Julie Doucet; Michel Rabagliati
- Series and characters: Onésime; Les Nombrils; Baptiste Ladébauche
- Languages: French

Related articles

Quebec comics (French: bande dessinée québécoise [bɑ̃d dɛ.si.ne ke.be.kwaz] or BDQ) are French language comics produced primarily in the Canadian province of Quebec, and read both within and outside Canada, particularly in French-speaking Europe.

In contrast to English language comics in Canada, which largely follow the American model, Quebec comics are influenced mainly by the trends in Franco-Belgian comics. There is little crossover between the French and English comics worlds in Canada.

== Overview ==
The majority language of Quebec is French, and Quebec comics refers to those comics published in French—English-language comics are considered part of the English-language part of Canadian comics history. The two traditions have little crossover, with the English tradition following mainly American trends, and the French tradition following mainly European ones, especially the French language Franco-Belgian trends. However, newspaper comic strips have tended to be French translations of syndicated American strips.

In the early 2000s, most comics consumed within Quebec were of European or American origin, with local comics only making up 5% of the total market, which had been true since the early 1970s. However, several comics of Québécois origin have found success overseas, like Michel Rabagliati's Paul series and Maryse Dubuc's Les Nombrils (The Bellybuttons), some of these cartoonists have had success with English translations, as when Montreal-based English publisher Drawn & Quarterly picked up Julie Doucet's Dirty Plotte, which won acclaim and awards in the English-speaking comics world.

== History ==
Native Quebec comics have had a long up-and-down history, alternating between periods of flourishing and periods languishing under the deluge of foreign comics.

=== 19th century ===
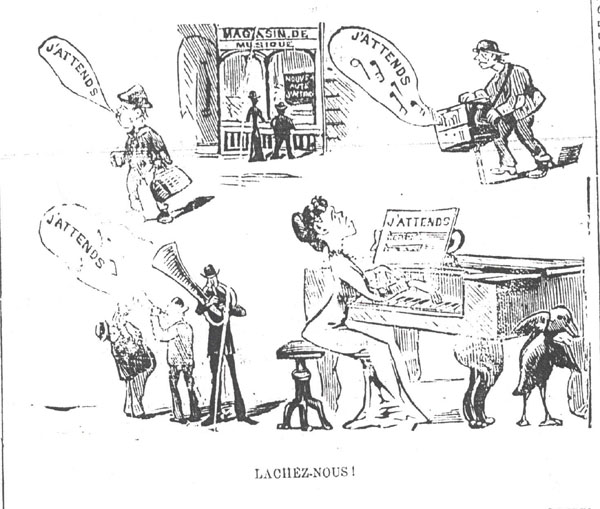
"J'attends!" (anonymous, 1883), the oldest known comic strip using a speech balloon

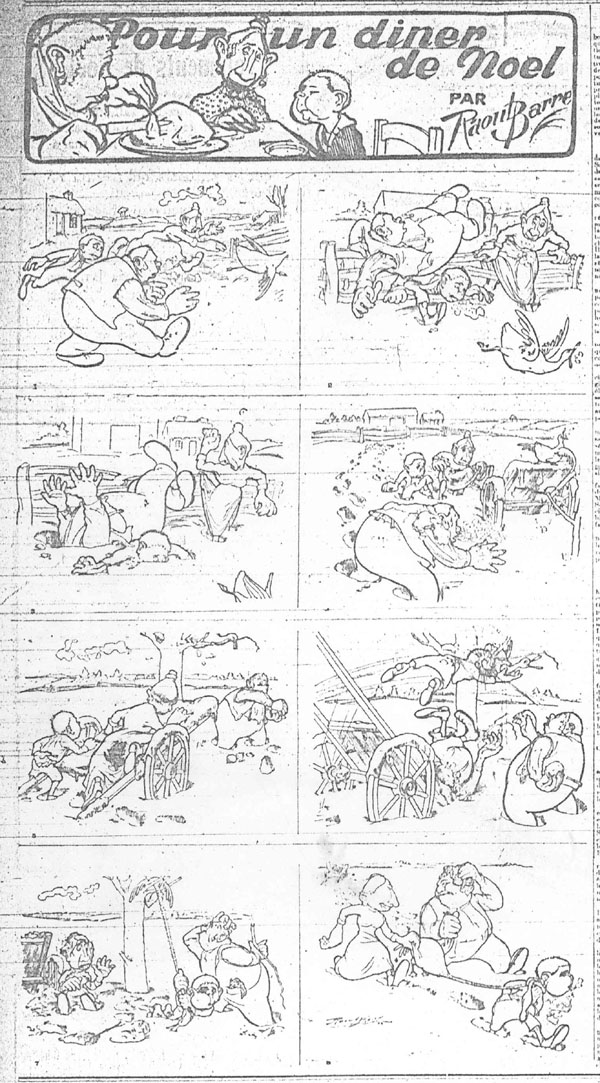
"Pour un dîner de Noël" (Raoul Barré, 1902), the first comic strip to appear in a daily Quebec newspaper. Barré demonstrates an interest in movement, which he would develop later as a pioneer in animation

Caricatures have appeared in newspapers in Quebec since at least the 18th century. A political poster using speech balloons from 1792 has been attested. Most were anonymous, but one, titled "La Ménagerie annexionniste", by William Augustus Leggo was another early francophone use of speech balloons. Later, speech balloons became more common in caricatures and advertising, and humorous and satirical publications proliferated.

By the end of the century, one could buy compilations of these cartoons and illustrations—the roots of comic albums in Quebec. Between 1878 and 1884, Henri Julien published two books of political caricatures, L’album drolatique du journal Le Farceur. In 1900, Morissette published Petit chien sauvage et savant, and in 1901 Raoul Barré put out En roulant ma boule. Following this, the number of cartoonists in newspapers in Quebec City and Montreal increased.

What has been called the first comic strip in Quebec appeared in 1866. The woodcut serial strip was called Baptiste Pacôt and has been attributed to the sculptor Jean-Baptiste Côté. A number of other pantomime or captioned strips appeared throughout the rest of the century. In 1902, Raoul Barré drew the captioned eight-panel strip, "Pour un dîner de Noël", which was the first known strip to appear in a daily Quebec newspaper. Barré created a strip called Noah's Ark in 1912 for the New York-based McClure Syndicate, which he brought to La Patrie the next year in French. Soon after he moved into animation and became an innovative pioneer in the field.

Hector Berthelot was a cartoonist and the publisher of Le Canard, where Berthelot started running satirical material signed Père Ladébauche ("Father Debauchery") starting in 1878. Berthelot would bring Ladébauche with him from newspaper to newspaper, and in 1904, Joseph Charlebois's comic strip version of Le Père Ladébauche debuted in La Presse, a popular strip that would last until 1957. Le Canard published the works of a number of other notable cartoonists, such as Henri Julien, and it was there that the oldest known comic strip using a speech balloon appeared, an unsigned strip printed on 22 September 1883.

=== Early 20th century comic strips ===
Albert Chartier's Onésime was the longest-running comic strip in Quebec. It replaced the popular American strip The Captain and the Kids when it first appeared

The popular press began to flourish at the turn of the century, and, as photographic reproduction was still in its infancy, the papers hired cartoonists and illustrators to liven up their pages, with the Montreal Star employing up to eight artists. La Patrie had convinced Albéric Bourgeois to give up his job at the Boston Globe and create comic strips for them back in Quebec. 1904 saw, in La Patrie, the publication of his Les Aventures de Timothée (The Adventures of Timothée), said to be the first French-language comic to feature speech balloons consistently. This began what historian Michel Viau calls "The Golden Age of the BDQ".

La Presse, in response to La Patrie's success with Timothée, added a weekly children's section, "La Ruche enfantine", which included comic strips. Charlebois's Père Ladébauche had begun, and after 43 instalments was taken over by Bourgeois, who continued to create other strips as well for La Presse, to which he soon moved and stayed with until his 1955 retirement. Théophile Busnel took over Timothée and continued it until his sudden death in 1908. It was replaced with a translation of American Richard F. Outcault's Buster Brown. Soon, other native strips were being replaced with translations of popular American strips, and by 1909, the "Golden Age" that had started in 1904 had come to an end. Native strips didn't disappear entirely, but those that remained lost the distinct flavour of contemporary life in Quebec, and began to imitate the silent films and vaudeville that were inundating popular culture in the province.

Québécois cartoonists would unsuccessfully propose a number of strips to compete with the American strips that dominated the Sundays and dailies. The native Quebec presence on those pages would become more dominant after 1940, however, with the introduction of the War Exchange Conservation Act, which restricted the import of foreign strips. Comic strips disappeared more-or-less from the dailies during World War I, and didn't really return until Arthur Lemay revived Timothée for a number of years starting in 1920. Weekend supplements grew, some to as many as 40 pages, but were filled with translations of American strips, which were well-distributed by the growing syndicates, as well as some strips from France. Some native strips continued to appear, however, and in 1935 Albert Chartier made his cartooning debut with a strip called Bouboule. In 1943, he created the comical character Onésime, a strip that would have the longest run of any in Quebec, and which replaced The Captain and the Kids when it first appeared. It starred a naïve and clumsy country person and his plump and authoritarian wife.

While the adventure strip flourished in the 1930s, papers in Quebec were unwilling to pay local artists more than what they would pay for a syndicated American strip, which made it hard for local artists to survive, due to the economies of scale that made it cheaper for them to buy the American strips. A few commissioned propaganda works and adaptations of "novels of the homeland" appeared. Rodolphe and Odette Vincent, under the banner of Éditions Vincent, produced some adaptations of adventure novels that they managed to sell to some papers, and were collected into albums by Quebec Éditions de l'A. B. After the end of World War II, however, Éditions Vincent found themselves unable to compete with the flood of American comics that returned after trade restrictions were loosened. The longest-running of the adventure strips was Les Aventures de Robert et Roland by Roberto Wilson, which debuted in 1956 and lasted until 1965.

Paulin Lessard, at the age of sixteen, had his Les Deux Petits Nains published in Le Progrès du Saguenay in 1947 and 1948. This was the first science fiction BDQ, about two brothers who were only a few centimetres tall, but were endowed with enormous strength, and met with people of other minuscule races.

=== Post-war era ===
The end of World War II brought with it a loosening in trade restrictions with the US, and American comics came flooding into the province. Whereas in English Canada this had meant the death toll for the local industry, in Quebec local production was paradoxically stimulated by the influx of foreign material. At the height of the "Great Darkness", a time of conservative government policies mixed with close government ties with the Catholic Church, the violence in many American comics at the time led to a belief that they promoted juvenile delinquency, and as it had in English Canada and the US, the belief prompted the authorities and concerned parents to crack down on comics. Gérard Tessier, with the support of Cardinal Paul-Émile Léger, published Face à l'imprimé obscène in 1955, in the vein of Fredric Wertham's Seduction of the Innocent.

Catholic comics reached their highest point at this time. The Centrale de la Jeunesse étudiante catholique ("The Centre for Young Catholic Students") put out the biweekly François beginning in 1943, printing mostly humorous strips. It was joined by Claire in 1957, the girls' version of François, which was almost identical in content. Hérauts began in 1944, at first printing translations of American strips from the religious Timeless Topix. The publication, which had a circulation of 100,000, had a mission to battle the "bad" American comics, and was distributed in schools starting in 1947, which resulted in fewer comics being included in its pages. Hérauts was also the first BDQ to be exported to the European market, although only briefly. By the mid-1950s, Hérauts was publishing local comics by the likes of Gabriel de Beney and Maurice Petitdidier. Almost all the strips from Hérauts, Québécois and American, were reprinted in comics albums during this time, and they also launched a younger version called Le Petit Hérauts in 1958, in which Petitdidier's Fanchon et Jean-Lou was particularly popular.

BDQ of this period flourished only between 1955 and 1960. After this time, the Catholic magazines once again took to reprinting American comics, and the market was flooded with glossy, full-colour Franco-Belgian comics magazines like Tintin, Spirou, Vaillant, Pif, and Pilote. By the mid-1960s, the Catholic publications were gone.

=== Spring of BDQ ===
The revolutionary 1960s and the Quiet Revolution in Quebec saw new vigour in BDQ. The so-called printemps de la BD québécoise ("Spring of Quebec comics") is said to have begun in 1968 with the creation of the group Chiendent, who published in La Presse and Dimanche-Magazine. Jacques Hurtubise (Zyx), Réal Godbout, Gilles Thibault ("Tibo"), and Jacques Boivin were particularly notable cartoonists, and publications appeared with names like Ma®de in Québec, L'Hydrocéphale illustré, La Pulpe, B.D., and L'Écran. The comics no longer focused on younger audiences, instead seeking confrontation or experimenting with graphics. The first modern Quebec comic book is said to be Oror 70 (Celle qui en a marre tire) by André Philibert, which dealt with countercultural topics like what were being seen in the underground comix of Robert Crumb and Gilbert Shelton. During the 1970s, BDQ were sometimes called "BDK", bande dessinée kébécoise.

Numerous short-lived, small press titles popped up here and there throughout the province. The artists who made them set out to challenge society, and the comics abounded in taboos, like sex and drugs. Lack of distribution, irregular publishing scales, and a relatively small market led eventually to the demise of these publications. Albums, on the other hand, had become incredibly popular, and large European publishers began to open Quebec divisions to deal with the demand for titles like The Adventures of Tintin, Asterix and Blueberry. Quebec publishers scrambled to get in on the boom, and published a number of albums, many based on TV characters, some aimed at adults.

This period saw an increased interest in Quebec of local comics, and a number of events were first held: the Salon international de la caricature de Montréal added a comic strip section to their annual exhibit in 1971; Festival de la bande dessinée de Montréal ("Festival of Comics of Montreal") was held for four years starting in 1975 at the University of Montreal; and the Musée d'art contemporain de Montréal mounted its first major retrospective of Quebec comics, presented at the Angoulême International Comics Festival in France. Richard Langlois developed a course called "Bande dessinée et figuration narrative" in Sherbrooke that was offered in post-secondary schools throughout the province, which sparked a number of other practical and theoretical courses to be offered in colleges and universities. (Note: In Canada, the words "university" and "college" have different meanings—both are post-secondary institutions, but, in general, a "university" is a school which grant degrees, while a "college" is a vocational school. See Education in Canada#Post-secondary education.) An issue of the literary journal La Barre du Jour dedicated an entire 260-page issue to Quebec comics, and certain arts and sociological magazines ran articles on the subject, as well as some popular newspapers and periodicals. A fanzine called B.D.K., published by Michel Ouellette and dedicated exclusively to Quebec comics, ran for three years beginning in 1975. Increasingly over this period, comics became increasingly deeply analyzed, and began to be taken seriously and scholarly as an artform. (Note: "Little by little, the original fans gave way to a new generation of more scholarly researchers. Historians, sociologists and semiologists took an interest in the comic strip, as being typical of the 20th century. Encyclopaedic, historical and pedagogic works appeared. The visual grammar and syntax of the comics were scrutinized, analyzed and examined in all their forms."—Michel Viau, 2002, writing about the period of 1971–1978)

In 1979, with the help of an $80,000 grant from the ministère des Affaires culturelles du Québec ("Quebec Ministry of Cultural Affairs"), Jacques Hurtubise, Pierre Huet and Hélène Fleury would establish the long-lived, satirical Croc ("Fang" in French), which published many leading talents of the era, many of whom were able to launch their careers through the magazine's help. Croc begat another magazine, Titanic, dedicated entirely to comics, and in 1987, Safarir (a pun, which combines "safari" with ça fait rire—"it makes you laugh"), a Mad-like publication patterned after the French Hara-Kiri, rose in competition with Croc, eventually putting the older magazine out of business. By the mid-1980s, a number of professional comics publishers began to flourish.

Adult and Underground comics of the time began to multiply, with notable titles including Cocktail, Tchiize! présente, Tchiize! bis, and the fanzine Iceberg appearing in the early 1980s, giving an outlet to young cartoonists like Henriette Valium and Julie Doucet. Fanzines, which had earlier focused on superheroes, now began to feature science fiction instead.

=== Since the 1990s ===
In Montreal in the 1980s and 1990s, in parallel to mainstream humour magazines, a healthy underground scene developed, and self-published fanzines proliferated. Julie Doucet, Henriette Valium, Luc Giard, Éric Thériault, Gavin McInnes and Siris were among the names that were discovered in the small press publications.

In the 21st century, some Québécois cartoonists who have seen success in Canada and abroad are Michel Rabagliati and his semi-autobiographical Paul series, Maryse Dubuc and Delaf's Les Nombrils (The Bellybuttons), aimed at teenaged girls, and Guy Delisle with various travelogue comics. All of these series have seen English translations. An increasing number of cartoonists also took to online webcomics.

Around the turn of the century, the government of Quebec mandated La Fondation du 9e art ("The 9th Art Foundation") to promote francophone cartoonists in North America. There have also emerged events such as the Festival de la bande dessinée francophone de Québec in Quebec City and la Zone internationale du neuvième art (ZINA).

== Publication, promotion and distribution ==
Comics publications tend to follow the Franco-Belgian model, with books printed as albums with either soft- or hardcovers. When aimed at children, they are usually in full-colour, while comics aimed at adults are often in black-and-white and have softcovers.

Traditionally, comics publishing in Quebec has centred in Montreal, Quebec City, Sherbrooke and, since the 1990s, in Gatineau. Fanzines are also produced throughout the province. There are a number of French-language comics publishers based in Quebec, such as Éditions Mille-Îles, La Pastèque, Les 400 coups, Mécanique Générale, and Glénat Québec, the Quebec arm of the France-based publisher Glénat. Translations into English of Québécois comics such as Michel Rabagliati's Paul series have been published by the English-language, Montreal-based Drawn & Quarterly, and Conundrum Press, also based in Montreal, has put much of its focus on publishing translations of Quebec comics.

The Prix Bédélys ("Bédélys Prize") has been awarded to French language comics since 2000. It comes with bursaries for the Prix Bédélys Québec for Best Book from Quebec and the Prix Bédélys Fanzine. The Joe Shuster Awards are open to all Canadian comics in any language, not limited to either French or English, and a number of francophone comics and publishers have won the awards.

The government of Quebec mandated La Fondation du 9e art ("The 9th Art Foundation") to promote francophone cartoonists in North America. Events such as the Festival de la bande dessinée francophone de Québec in Quebec City and la Zone internationale du neuvième art (ZINA) celebrate francophone comics in Quebec.

== See also ==
- List of Canadian comics creators
- Culture of Quebec
- Montreal Comiccon
