= MensuHell =

Canadian comics fanzine

- Editor: Steve Requin; Francis Hervieux.
- Categories: Comics fanzine
- Frequency: Monthly
- First issue: December 1999
- Final issue: December 2008
- Company: Éditions Les Publications Requin Roll
- Country: Canada
- Based in: Montréal
- ISSN: 1912-9769

MensuHell is a Canadian comics fanzine published in Montréal in Québec from December 1999 to December 2008.

With 109 issues, MensuHell is probably the Québec comics fanzine which has the longest run. The name MensuHell is a sound-alike portmanteau of the French word "mensuel" (monthly), and the English word "hell".

== Description of the content ==
The content of the periodical publication MensuHell is principally made of original material of bandes dessinées, with some editorial texts and historical ones.

MensuHell has been steadily presenting an average of 40 pages of comics in every issue, alongside articles on Quebec comics by comics historians Michel Viau and Marc Jetté.

The contributors are from Canada and are mostly francophones. Some of the comics are published in English.

== History ==
The founder of MensuHell is the comics artist Steve Requin who was also its former editor, but ownership has since been passed to the comics fan Francis Hervieux in 2002.

MensuHell was sold in Montréal and in Québec City, in specialized comics stores.

With 109 issues, MensuHell enjoys one of the longest run for a fanzine published in Quebec.

== Contributors ==
Some of these artists work under a pseudonym.

=== Comics artists ===
The Québec comics artists are usually complete artists : they make the script, the pencils, the inks and the letters of their comics pages. It happens that they work with a writer.

- 4in
- Al+Flag (Alain Gosselin)
- Avary (Jean-François April)
- Kurt Beaulieu
- Mathieu Benoît
- Jacques Boivin
- Guillaume Boucher
- Guy Boutin
- David Carles
- Julien Chung
- Pierre-Yves Clerson
- Antoine Corriveau
- Duy
- Leanne Franson
- Gag (André Gagnon)
- Richard Gagnon
- Laurent Gautreau
- Luc Giard
- Philippe Gonyea
- Guert
- Arnaud Hilmarcher
- Marc Jetté
- Noée Joanisse
- Benoît Joly
- Karl Dupéré-Richer
- Michel Lacombe
- Félix Laflamme
- Michèle Laframboise
- Mathieu Quesnel
- Billy Mavreas
- Valérie Morency
- Luis Neves
- Marc Pageau
- Patrofskynoff
- Éric Piccoli
- Nicolas Plamondon
- Steve Requin
- Louis Rémillard
- Jack Ruttan
- Salgood Sam (Max Douglas)
- Sirkowski (Sébastien Fréchette)
- Éric Thériault
- Jane Tremblay
- Zviane

== See also ==
- Franco-Belgian comics
- Canadian comics
- Quebec comic strips

== Sources ==
- Michel Viau, BDQ, Répertoire des publications de bandes dessinées au Québec des origines à nos jours, éditions Mille-Îles, 1999 (in French)
- Mira Falardeau, Histoire de la bande dessinée au Québec, VLB éditeur, 2008 (in French)
