= Éric Thériault =

Canadian comics artist, writer, illustrator and blogger

- Born: Éric Thériault; 1967 (age 58–59)
- Areas: Writer, Penciller, Artist, Inker, Editor, Publisher, Letterer, Colourist
- Notable works: Veena; Captain Canuck; Johnny Dollar
- Awards: Prix Solaris, second prize (comics section), 1993 Daytime Emmy Awards for Outstanding Children's Animated Program, Arthur (PBS) 1998,1999

Éric Thériault (born 1967 in Trois-Rivières, Quebec) is a Canadian comics artist, writer, illustrator and blogger living in Montreal, Quebec, Canada.

== Biography ==
Éric Thériault began as a teenager publishing comics in a fanzine called Meteor in 1982, created with the help of Stéphane Sicard. This fanzine specialized in science fiction and superheroes.

Among his works include his self-published comic book Veena, published intermittently since 1991, initially as a minicomic, then later as an alternative comic book, and in recent years as a webcomic. He also created John Star, published in the Veena comic book and in Mensuhell. He published various short stories in many anthologies like Real Stuff, Duplex Planet (both at Fantagraphics Books), Legal Action Comics, and 9-11: Emergency Relief (Alternative Comics).

He also worked in mainstream and alternative comics on titles such as Captain Canuck, Terra Obscura, Tales of the Teenage Mutant Ninja Turtles and on a Johnny Dollar adaptation for Moonstone Books in 2003.

He has also pursued a career as a book illustrator and as a designer for the cartoon industry on series such as Arthur, Animal Crackers, Caillou, Treasure, F Is for Family, Walter and Tandoori and others.

== Bibliography ==
=== Albums ===
- L'Univers Rockefeller, 1989, éditions du Phylactère, Montreal.
- Veena et les Spectres du Temps, 2010, Éditions 400 Coups Rotor label, Montreal.
- Veena: detective dello strano ed insolito, 2011, E.F.edizioni, Italy.

=== Group albums ===
- Écran D'arrêt, 1991, A.C.I.B.D., Montreal ;
- Rêves, 1992, Éditions du Phylactère/Paje éditeur/A.C.I.B.D. Montreal ;
- Cœur de Glace, 2009, Éditions 400 Coups Rotor label, Montreal.
- Frankenstein Réassemblé, 2010, Éditions 400 Coups Rotor label, Montreal.

=== Periodical publications ===
Magazines

- Zeppelin, Quebec city comics magazine, 1992–1993 ;
- Solaris, Quebec's science fiction and fantasy magazine, 1993 ;
- Zine Zag, 100% comics, 1998–2004 ;
- Safarir, Quebec's illustrated humour magazine, 2003–2010.

Fanzines

- Météor, science fiction comics, 1982 ;
- Laser, science fiction comics, 1982–1984 ;
- Bédézine, BD de science-fiction, 1983 ;
- Empire, science fiction comics, 1984 ;
- Krypton, science fiction comics, 1985–1988 ;
- Rectangle, experimental comics, 1987–1989 ;
- XL5, science fiction comics, 1989–1990 ;
- Veena and the Time Machine, science fiction comics, 1991–1993 ;
- MensuHell, Montreal underground comics, 2000–2009.

== Exhibitions ==
=== Group exhibitions ===
- 1985: Festival de la caricature et de la bande dessinée, CEGEP de Trois-Rivières, Trois-Rivières ;
- 1991: Écran D'arrêt, CEGEP du Vieux-Montreal, 6th Festival international de bande dessinée de Montréal, Montreal ;
- 1992: Rêves, CEGEP du Vieux-Montréal, 7th Festival international de bande dessinée de Montréal, Montreal ;
- 1992: Cadres, BD actuelle au Québec, Les Foufounes Électriques, 7th Festival international de bande dessinée de Montréal, Montreal ;
- 1993: Dessinateurs du Québec, Centre belge de la bande dessinée, Bruxelles (Belgique).

== Awards ==
- 1993: Prix Solaris comics section, second prize for the comic short story Balmoral published in the magazine Solaris (issue number 106, August 1993).
- 1998, 1999: Daytime Emmy Awards for Outstanding Children's Animated Program, Arthur (PBS) (contributor)

== Bibliography and sources ==
- Le Phylactère maudit, interview by Michel Pleau, in Zine Zag, issue number 2, May 1999, éditions Publika, Saint-Martin (in French)
- Bernard Dubois, Bande dessinée québécoise : répertoire bibliographique à suivre, éditions D.B.K., 1996 (in French)
- Michel Viau, BDQ, Répertoire des publications de bandes dessinées au Québec des origines à nos jours, éditions Mille-Îles, 1999 (in French)
- Mira Falardeau, Histoire de la bande dessinée au Québec, VLB éditeur, 2008 (in French)

== See also ==
- Bande dessinée
- Canadian comics
- Quebec comic strips
