= Steve Requin =

Canadian cartoonist

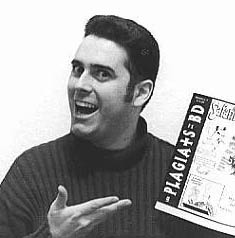
- Born: Stéphane Johnson; July 21, 1968 (age 58) Montreal, Quebec, Canada
- Areas: Writer, Penciller, Artist, Inker, Editor, Publisher, Letterer, Colorist
- Notable works: The Eight; Artiztech College; Safarir; MensuHell

Steve Requin (born Stéphane Johnson, July 21, 1968) is a Canadian cartoonist from Beloeil, Quebec.

== Biography ==
Steve Requin started publishing comics in 1988 for a French Canadian pop music magazine called Wow !, comics that he signed under the pseudonym Jon-Son.

In December 1994 he adopted the name Steve Requin and founded Les Publications Requin Roll for which he created and published many underground magazines such as Requin Roll and Les Plagiats de la BD. In 1999, he founded MensuHell, Québec's longest monthly underground comics magazine. MensuHell's ownership has been passed to Francis Hervieux in 2002, who kept publishing it until issue No. 109, dated December 2008.

From November 2001 to November 2008, Steve has been a writer and artist for Safarir, Québec's answer to the American magazine Mad. He mostly wrote and/or drew parodies of TV shows and movies, but he is also known for comics series such as Malice (drawn by Serge Boisvert DeNevers) and Konar.

In 2017, at the Festival de la bande dessinée francophone de Québec, he received the Jacques-Hurtubise award for his comic project, La Clique Vidéo.

In 2023, he published Le sucre rouge de Duplessis at Éditions du Tullinois. It is an essay about the beet sugar industry in the Province of Quebec under the reign of Quebec's Prime Minister Maurice Duplessis.

In 2025, he published L'Amour est dans le champ de patates at Les éditions de l'Apothéose.

He is the Great-grand nephew of writer and historian Ægidius Fauteux.

== Bibliography ==
=== Periodical publications ===
Magazines

- Wow !, pop music magazine, 1988–1989
- Zine Zag, 100% comics, 1998–2004
- Safarir, Québec's illustrated humour magazine, 2001–2008

Fanzines

- MensuHell, Montréal underground comics 1999–2002
- Requin Roll, Montréal underground comics 1994–1999
- Les Plagiats de la BD, Montréal underground comics 1997–1999

== See also ==
- Bande dessinée
- Canadian comics
- Quebec comic strips
