= Pierre Fournier (comics) =

Comic creator (1949–2022)

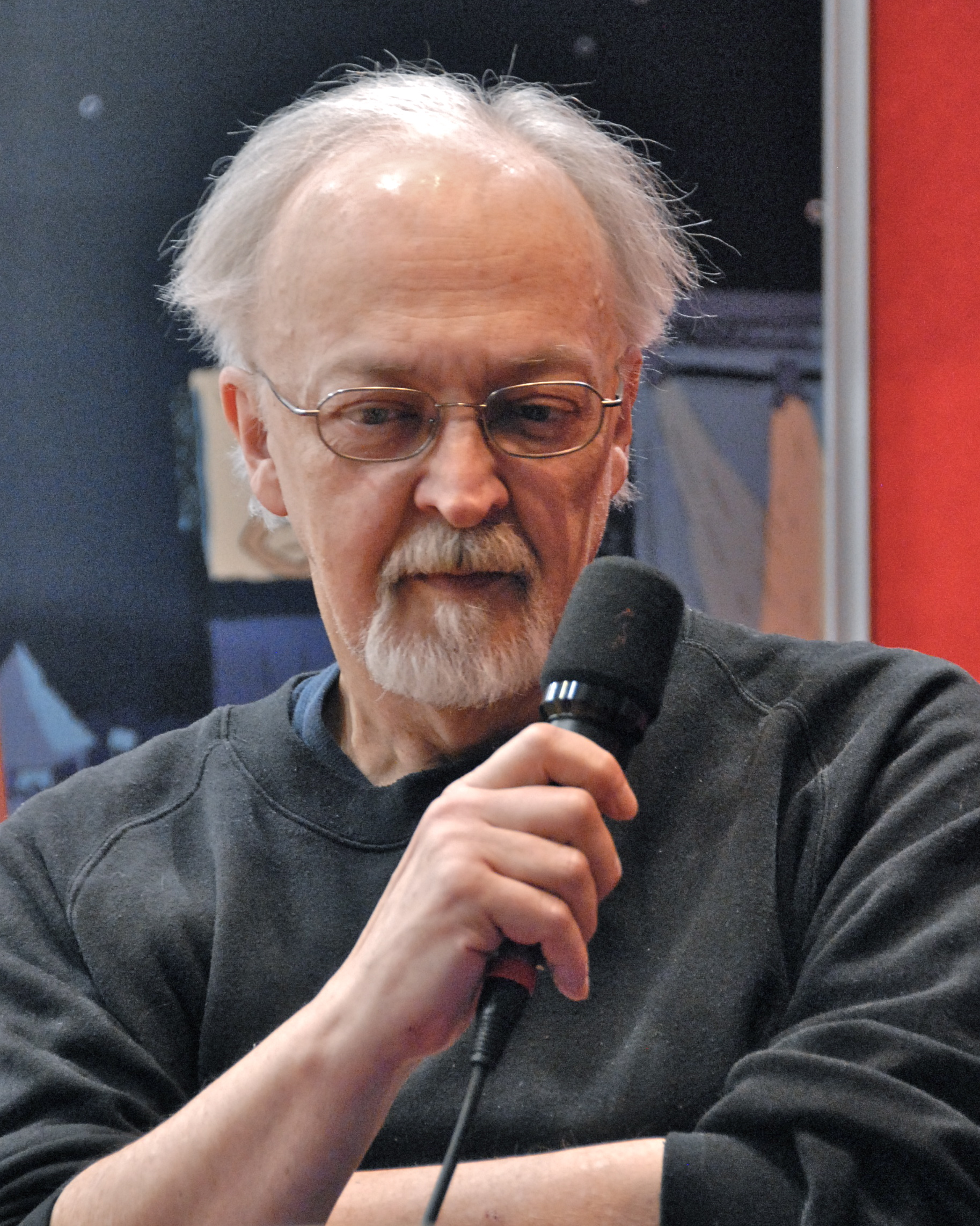
- Fournier in 2012
- Born: 8 December 1949; Montreal, Quebec, Canada
- Died: 12 November 2022 (aged 72)
- Occupations: Writer and illustrator
- Years active: 1970–2022
- Website: frankensteinia.blogspot.ca

Pierre Fournier (8 December 1949 – 12 November 2022) was a Canadian comic book writer, artist, editor, promoter and publisher. He was best known for his Michel Risque and Red Ketchup series which he co-created with his long-time friend Réal Godbout.

== Biography ==
Fournier's satirical superhero comic, Les Aventures du Capitaine Kébec, debuted in 1973 and was important to the "Springtime of Comics" movement that saw a new generation of artists creating comic books in Québec. Fournier was involved as a writer/artist, editor, art director, publisher and a passionate promoter. In 1974, he organized Québecomics, the first exhibition of its kind, shown in New York, Eastern Canada and Europe. In 1975–76, Fournier produced and hosted a popular television series, Les Amis du Capitaine Kébec, entirely devoted to comics.

Fournier contributed to every issue of the humor magazine Croc (1979-1995) either illustrating his own strips or writing for a who's who of Québec artists. With his longtime friend and collaborator, artist Réal Godbout, Fournier co-created and co-scripted the now legendary Michel Risque and Red Ketchup strips serialized over a period of fifteen years in Croc and Titanic magazines.

In 1986, Fournier was the founding president of the ACIBD, an association of comic art professionals. In 1991, he was presented with the prestigious Albert Chartier Award for his outstanding contributions to comics.

In the late 1980s, Fournier worked as an inker for Marvel Comics and he was an editor and art director for the English-language Matrix Comics of Montréal. In 1990–91, he contributed to the Québec edition of Mad Magazine and edited Anormal, a humor and comics magazine aimed at young teens. In recent years, Pierre Fournier has written extensively for screen and television. He is also an authority on classic horror films and writes the Rondo-nominated blog, Frankensteinia.

The Michel Risque and Red Ketchup series are currently enjoying a critically acclaimed and best-selling revival, all fourteen graphic novels being published by La Pastèque of Montreal. In February 2008, Fournier's Capitaine Kébec character was chosen as the most iconic image of Québec comics and featured as the cover of Mira Falardeau's Histoire de la bande dessinée au Québec, a history of Québec comics spanning the mid-1800s to today.

In 2008, Fournier was inducted into the Canadian Comic Book Creator Hall of Fame.

Fournier died on November 12, 2022, at the age of 72. Leading up to his death, he was working on the story for an animated series based on Red Ketchup, along with his co-creator Réal Godbout and director Martin Villeneuve.
