= Zyx (cartoonist) =

French-Canadian cartoonist and publisher

Jacques Hurtubise
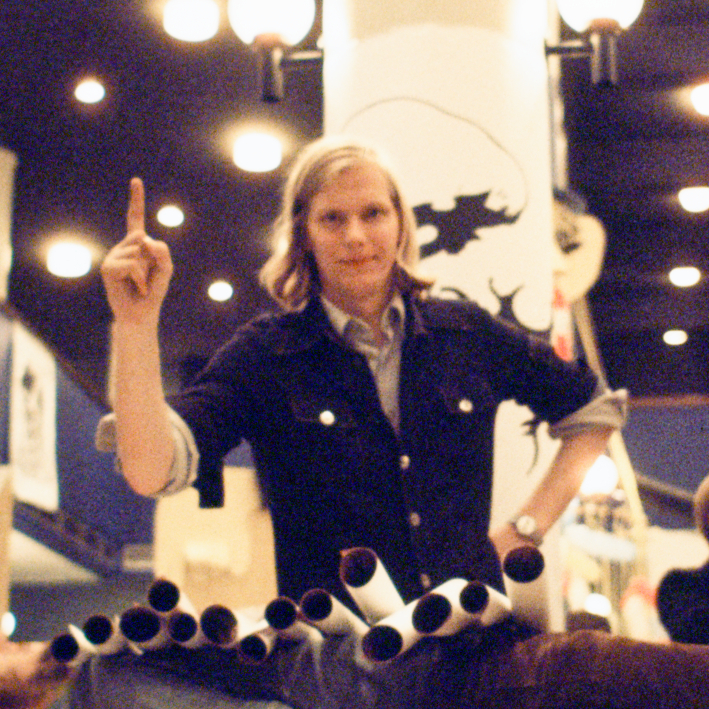
- Jacques Hurtubise in 1973
- Born: 1950; Ottawa, Ontario, Canada
- Died: 11 December 2015 (aged 65); Montreal, Quebec, Canada
- Other names: Zyx
- Occupation(s): cartoonist and publisher
- Known for: Croc magazine
- Awards: Joe Shuster Award 2007

Jacques Hurtubise (November 1950 – 11 December 2015) was a Canadian cartoonist and publisher. He was one of the founders of Croc magazine and is considered one of the most prominent figures in Quebec comics of the 1970s and 1980s.

He was born in Ottawa. Hurtubise's earliest work appeared in his first attempt at a comics magazine was L'Hydrocéphale Illustré in November 1971, in collaboration with Gilles Desjardins and Françoise Barrette. It was not a success. Following it, he founded a group of young Canadian artists called the Coopérative des Petits Dessins. Throughout the 1970s he produced over 200 comic strips for the newspaper Le Jour. In these strips appeared the characters le Sombre Vilain and his sidekick Bill, the gluttonous boa constrictor who loved to eat pizza delivery men. These adventures continued in the humorous magazine Croc, which he founded in 1979 with Hélène Fleury and Roch Côté.

Hurtubise is one of only two Québécois cartoonists, with Albert Chartier, to appear in Le Dictionnaire mondial de la Bande Dessinée and The World Encyclopedia of Comics. In 2007 he won the Joe Shuster Award, an award for Canadian cartoonists. His works and letters are kept in the Bibliothèque et Archives nationales du Québec.

Hurtubise was also the Rhinoceros Party candidate in 1979 for the Papineau riding. On 11 December 2015, he died in Montreal at the age of 65.
