= Võro =

Võro may refer to:

- Võro people, an ethnic group of Estonia
- Võro language, a language belonging to the Baltic-Finnic branch of the Finno-Ugric languages of Estonia
- Võro Institute, the governing organization of the Võro language
- Õilme Võro (born 1996), Estonian sprinter

Voro may refer to:

- Voro language (Adamawa), spoken in Nigeria
- Voro (author) (born 1975), Canadian comic book author
- Voro (footballer) (born 1963), Spanish footballer
- Gairo Voro (born 2003), Papua New Guinean rugby league player

== See also ==
- Voru (disambiguation)
