= Pierre Huet =

Pierre Huet may refer to:

- Pierre Daniel Huet (1630–1721), French prelate and scholar
- Pierre Huet, songwriter for the Québec bands Beau Dommage and Offenbach (band) and for many other singers, and also editor-in-chief and co-founder of Québec humour magazine Croc (magazine)
