= Red Ketchup =

Comic book and 2023 animated series

Red Ketchup is a French Canadian comic book series created in 1982 by Pierre Fournier and Réal Godbout. The series follows the exploits of Steve "Red" Ketchup, a crazed FBI rogue agent.

An animated series, directed by Martin Villeneuve and produced by Sphere Media, premiered in 2023.

== The character ==
Steve "Red" Ketchup — an albino empowered by chemical means — is a former police officer, now FBI agent. Ruthless and violent, a combatant skilled in both armed and unarmed fighting techniques, he appears to be invulnerable, apparently through a combination of being incredibly fit, having a high pain threshold, and drug overdose. Ketchup is a veteran of the Vietnam War.

Red Ketchup's real name is Steve Kecziupelski, and his parents are of Polish origin. His childhood neighborhood seen in the flashbacks is located in Hamtramck, a city in Wayne County in the U.S. state of Michigan, near Detroit and Highland Park, but Ketchup was born by accident on the other side of the border, in Windsor, Ontario.

== History of the graphic novels ==
Red Ketchup first appeared in 1982 as a supporting character in the Michel Risque comics series by Pierre Fournier and Réal Godbout, published as a monthly serial in the humor magazine Croc. The early Red Ketchup adventures were first collected into graphic novels in the late 80's by Croc Publishing of Montreal and Dargaud of France. The entire collection is currently in print for the French-speaking world from La Pastèque of Montreal.

In La Vie en rouge ("Seeing Red"), Ketchup is recruited by a secret society of Knights Templar with world domination in mind, and Kamarade Ultra ("Komrade Ultra") takes Red from the frozen wastes of Antarctica to the streets of Soviet-era Moscow, visiting mayhem and provoking diplomatic incidents along the way.

In Red Ketchup contre Red Ketchup ("Red Ketchup vs. Red Ketchup"), the hero goes up against an army of killer clones of himself, unleashed by an ex-Nazi scientist bent on kicking off the Fourth Reich.

In Red Ketchup s'est échappé ("Red Ketchup has Escaped!"), the hero quits the FBI and establishes himself as a private detective and bodyguard in Los Angeles. He is soon hired as stuntman in a harebrained grade-Z film loosely based on his own life, gets embroiled in a sordid case of human trafficking and he reunites with his sister Sally, whom he hasn't seen in 25 years.

In Le Couteau aztèque ("The Aztec Knife"), a catatonic Red Ketchup is led by his sister Sally to a South American shaman who, to shock Ketchup back to his senses, sends him back and forth through time, riding a magical jaguar. Ketchup's timeslips has him interacting with Moses, Attila the Hun, Napoleon and the emperor Montezuma, and repeatedly upsetting the very course of history.

In L'Oiseau aux sept surfaces ("The Bird with Seven Faces"), Ketchup, back with the FBI, is given a bogus mission, basically meant to keep him out of trouble. Tasked with saving the all-American Thanksgiving turkey from foreign threats, Ketchup somehow ends up in Japan investigating sightings of Godzilla-size farm animals. In Échec au King ("Viva Las Ketchup"), Red is charged with probing paranormal and cryptozoological mysteries, and the Search for Elvis.

In Red Ketchup en Enfer ("Red Ketchup Goes to Hell"), Ketchup dies again, this time seemingly forever. Landing in the afterlife, he is banished to Hell where Lucifer himself hires him to bring some semblance of order to the chaos of Hades. Soon, harried denizens of the Infernal Regions begin leaving for The Surface and start popping up on Earth.

In Elixir X, Ketchup's archenemy Doctor Künt (previously seen in Kamarade Ultra, Red Ketchup contre Red Ketchup and L'Oiseau aux sept surfaces) has stumbled upon a possible Fountain of Youth, merchandized as a face cream by a reckless pharmaceutical company. The anti-wrinkle formula is a runaway success, but has the unfortunate side effect of users to go into sudden, uncontrollable and murderous rages.

In The Orange Agent, Red Ketchup enters the conflict with Donald Trump.

Pierre Fournier and Réal Godbout have both been inducted into the Canadian Comic Book Creator Hall of Fame, in 2008 and 2009, respectively.

=== Albums ===
1. La Vie en rouge ("Seeing Red"), volume 1, La Pastèque (2007)
2. Kamarade Ultra, Croc Albums (1988) / reprint, volume 2, La Pastèque (2008)
3. Red Ketchup contre Red Ketchup ("Red Ketchup vs. Red Ketchup"), Croc Albums (1992) / reprint, volume 3, La Pastèque (2009)
4. Red Ketchup s'est échappé! ("Red Ketchup has Escaped!"), Croc Albums (1994) / reprint, volume 4, La Pastèque (2010)
5. Le couteau Aztèque ("The Aztec Knife"), volume 5, La Pastèque (2012)
6. L'oiseau aux sept surfaces ("The Bird with Seven Faces"), volume 6, La Pastèque (2013)
7. Échec au King ("Viva Las Ketchup"), volume 7, La Pastèque (2015)
8. Red Ketchup en Enfer ("Red Ketchup Goes to Hell"), volume 8, La Pastèque (2016)
9. Élixir X ("Elixir X"), volume 9, La Pastèque (2017)
10. L'Agent orange ("The Orange Agent"), volume 10, La Pastèque (2024)

== Animated series ==
An animated series adaptation of the comic was released in April 2023, and premiered in French on Télétoon (via Télétoon la nuit), and in English on Adult Swim. The show was directed by Martin Villeneuve and produced by Sphere Media.

=== Production ===
Red Ketchup originated from a successful pitch to Télétoon in 2020, where director Martin Villeneuve received immediate approval for the project, after dedicating years to crafting the series bible. Despite various attempts to adapt Red Ketchup into different media, including a proposed live-action film, the animated series became the first successful adaptation. Co-creator Pierre Fournier contributed to the early development of the animated series before his death in 2022. Réal Godbout supervised the production design of the series, and also participated in the writing. Both Fournier and Godbout are credited as "creative consultants" on all 20 episodes. Set in 1986 during the Cold War, the animated series closely follows the genre-shifting nature of the original comics, incorporating political satire, science fiction, fantasy, adventure, and parody of classic films. The adaptation expands the relatively brief serialized stories into a twenty-episode arc, primarily drawn from the content of the initial three comic book albums, with a focus on developing the lives of the supporting cast. The series retains its relevance by addressing Cold War themes, which still resonate in the contemporary context. The character Red Ketchup, a hard-nosed agent with a high tolerance for pain and drugs, is portrayed as a complex figure with limits, such as refusing to harm women or children and advocating for the underdog.

The series became the most-watched show on Télétoon la nuit, with the airing of its first 10 episodes even surpassing The Simpsons in Quebec. The channel experienced a 23% growth in 2023 due to the broadcast of this series featuring the crazed FBI agent. Red Ketchup was listed in Bubbleblabber's "Top 10" of the best adult animated series of 2023 on an international level.

=== Casting ===
In the English version of the series, Michael Kash assumed the role of Red Ketchup, while Benoît Brière portrayed the character in French. Peter Plywood, Red Ketchup's field partner, was loosely inspired from Maxwell Smart in Get Smart. Kintaro Akiyama provided the voice for Plywood in English, while Gabriel Lessard performed it on French. France Castel, who voices Sally Ketchup in French, shares an identical voice with Jana Peck, the English performer of the character. Sally, Red's sister, an ultra-feminist with a dry wit and colorful vocabulary, is described as a blend of Janis Joplin and Julianne Moore's Maude character in The Big Lebowski. In the French version, writer-director Martin Villeneuve lent his voice to the character of Bill Bélisle, a journalist and Sally Ketchup's former lover. Villeneuve, who previously starred as Imelda in The 12 Tasks of Imelda, auditioned for the role. In English, Bill Bélisle is portrayed by veteran voice actor John Stocker. Red Ketchup's arch-nemesis, Dr. K, whose full name is Otto Künt, is a malevolent scientist who strikes deals with international enemies to fund his dubious experiments. Notably, he creates replicas of Red Ketchup to form a mini army and develops a formula to enlarge humans into killing giants. Above all, Dr. K seeks immortality. His deceased lover, Pandora, is replicated as a blow-up doll, and he genuinely believes she is alive, conversing with her as he would with his wife. Dr. K is voiced by Benedict Campbell in English and by Alain Zouvi in French. In the English edition, Nicole Bauman, also serving as production manager at Sphere Animation, provided the voice for the Russian Olga Dynamo, Red's female counterpart. In the French version, Quebec actress Émilie Bibeau lent her voice to Olga.

=== Episodes ===
Episode 1: Ketchup on Ice: Rogue FBI agent Red Ketchup is sent to Antarctica on a bogus mission, but he uncovers a Soviet plot involving his archenemy, Dr. Otto K.

Episode 2: Cold War: As his investigation in Antarctica continues, Red Ketchup teams up with a disgruntled Soviet scientist, who turns out to be Soviet agent Olga Dynamo.

Episode 3: Finding Dr. K: Red Ketchup finds himself in Moscow, where his old enemy Dr. K puts him through a mind and body-control experiment.

Episode 4: Red Sees Red: After escaping from the Komrade Ultra program, Red Ketchup runs amok in Moscow.

Episode 5: Better Dead than Red: When Red visits a comic book convention in New York on another bogus mission, he uncovers a plot by Dr. K to attack the world with clones of Red.

Episode 6: Rat Ketchup: While searching the New York subway system for his clone, Red discovers that Dr. K is planning a worldwide attack using Red Ketchup clones.

Episode 7: Apocalypse Red: When Red travels to Vietnam to find more evidence of Dr. K's clones, he finds himself entangled with a faux-fashion maven and her twin sister, while trying to stop a plot to kill the Canadian Prime Minister.

Episode 8: Toronto the Red: Toronto the Good does not know what hit it when Red Ketchup comes to town on the hunt for a clone who is determined to blow up the CN Tower.

Episode 9: Dope and the Red Pope: Red travels to Rome, where one of his identical clones has just been elected pope.

Episode 10: Hot Cuban Ketchup: Red travels to Cuba to confront Dr. K and end his evil clone plot once and for all.

Episode 11: Red Templar: Red Ketchup is recruited by the Solemn Order of Templars to find the Seven Cups of the Apocalypse, beginning with the one hidden in the Amazon jungle.

Episode 12: The Red Side of the Moon: Red Ketchup and Peter Plywood travel to the dark side of the Moon with Olga Dynamo to locate the 2nd Cup of the Apocalypse.

Episode 13: Full Metal Ketchup: Red Ketchup and Peter Plywood return to Vietnam, eventually at a POW camp making drugs for corrupt Soviets.

Episode 14: The Hunt for Red Titanic: Red Ketchup dives to the Titanic to find the next Cup of the Apocalypse and faces a lunatic Templar, is attacked by a Soviet submarine, and gets swallowed by a whale.

Episode 15: The Guardian of the Ketchupalypse: Red Ketchup goes back to Toronto to retrieve the 5th Cup of the Apocalypse, but soon discovers that the cups have a supernatural protector.

Episode 16: Red Pops Art: While trying to steal the 6th Cup of the Apocalypse from a party at Mandy Norwal's underground art space, Red Ketchup runs afoul of a gang of subterranean mole people.

Episode 17: Wenceslas the Red: Red Ketchup travels back to the 13th century and enlists the help of Knight Wenceslas the Red to foil a medieval world-domination plot by Dr. K's ancestor, Septimus Maximus.

Episode 18: The Red Ketchup Triangle: Just as Red Ketchup's search for the Seven Cups appears to be over, he finds himself trapped inside the Bermuda Triangle.

Episode 19: Ketchup with a Ketchup Chaser: When Sally Ketchup steals the Seven Cups of the Apocalypse, her brother Red must team up with an old friend to get them back.

Episode 20: Ketchup on Fire: Red Ketchup delivers seven cups worth of mayhem to the Templars, and finally ends the case of the Seven Cups of the Apocalypse.
