= Pierre Fournier (disambiguation) =

Pierre Fournier (1906–1986) was a French cellist.

Pierre Fournier may also refer to:

- Pierre Simon Fournier (1712–1768), French typographer and printer
- Pierre Fournier (comics) (1949–2022), French-Canadian comic book artist and writer
- Makyo (comics) (born 1952), French comics writer and artist
