= La Pastèque =

French Canadian comics publisher

- Status: Active
- Founded: July 1998
- Founder: Martin Brault; Frédéric Gauthier
- Country of origin: Canada
- Headquarters location: Montreal, Quebec
- Distribution: Canada and Europe
- Publication types: French-language comics
- Official website: www.lapasteque.com

La Pastèque is a French Canadian publisher of comics, based in Montreal, Quebec.

== Overview ==
La Pastèque ("The Watermelon" in English) was founded by Martin Brault and Frédéric Gauthier in Montreal, Quebec in July 1998, and their first publication, the first volume of Spoutnik, appeared that December.

The establishment publisher arose from talks between Brault and Gauthier about the state of comics in Quebec around 1997. Things seemed pessimistic, and it seemed unlikely that the small market in the province could sustain itself. The two wanted to invigorate comics publishing in Québec, and chose to adopt a different approach to that of Franco-Belgian or American comics by publishing artists who had more personal work. They are the main French-language publisher of a number of artists such as Michel Rabagliati, and have also revived older albums, such as Jean-Paul Eid's Jérôme Bigras and Réal Godbout & Pierre Fournier's Red Ketchup.

== Recognition ==
La Pastèque has received support from the Canada Council for the Arts, the Société de développement des entreprises culturelles ("Society for the Development of Cultural Enterprises") and the Government of Quebec's tax credit program for support of book publishers. In 2010, La Pastèque won the Joe Shuster Award for Outstanding Publisher.

== Published work ==
- Red Ketchup
- The Postman from Space

== See also ==
- Canadian comics
- Quebec comics
- Culture of Quebec
