= Voru =

Voru may refer to:

== Places ==
- Võru County, Estonia
  - Võru, a town and municipality, capital of the county
  - Võru Parish, a rural municipality in the county
- Voru, Razavi Khorasan, Iran, a village
- Voru, Tajikistan, a village and jamoat

== Other uses ==
- Võru JK, a former football club based in Võru, Estonia
- Võru railway station, Võru, Estonia

== See also ==
- Voro (disambiguation)
