= Henriette Valium =

Canadian artist (1959–2021)

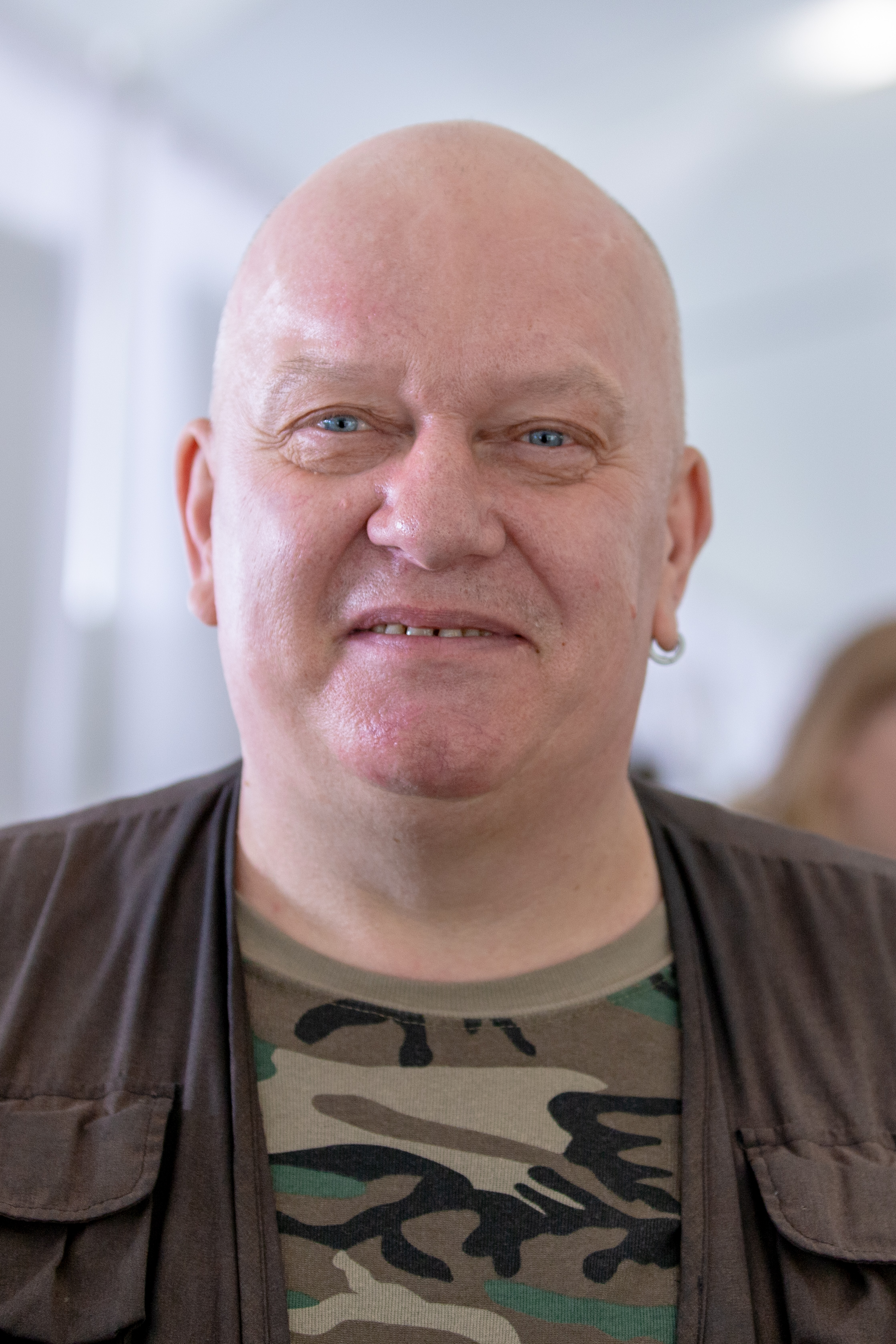
- Valium in 2019
- Born: Patrick Henley; May 4, 1959
- Died: September 3, 2021 (aged 62)
- Known for: Drawing
- Movement: Montreal Comix Scene

Patrick Henley (May 4, 1959 – September 3, 2021), known professionally as Henriette Valium, was a Canadian comic book artist and painter based in Montreal, Quebec.

== Career ==
In March 2013, some of Valium's art pieces were shown at Espace Robert Poulin in Montreal.

Valium won the Pigskin Peters Award at the 2017 Doug Wright Awards for his Palace of Champions graphic novel (Conundrum, 2016).
