= Réal Godbout =

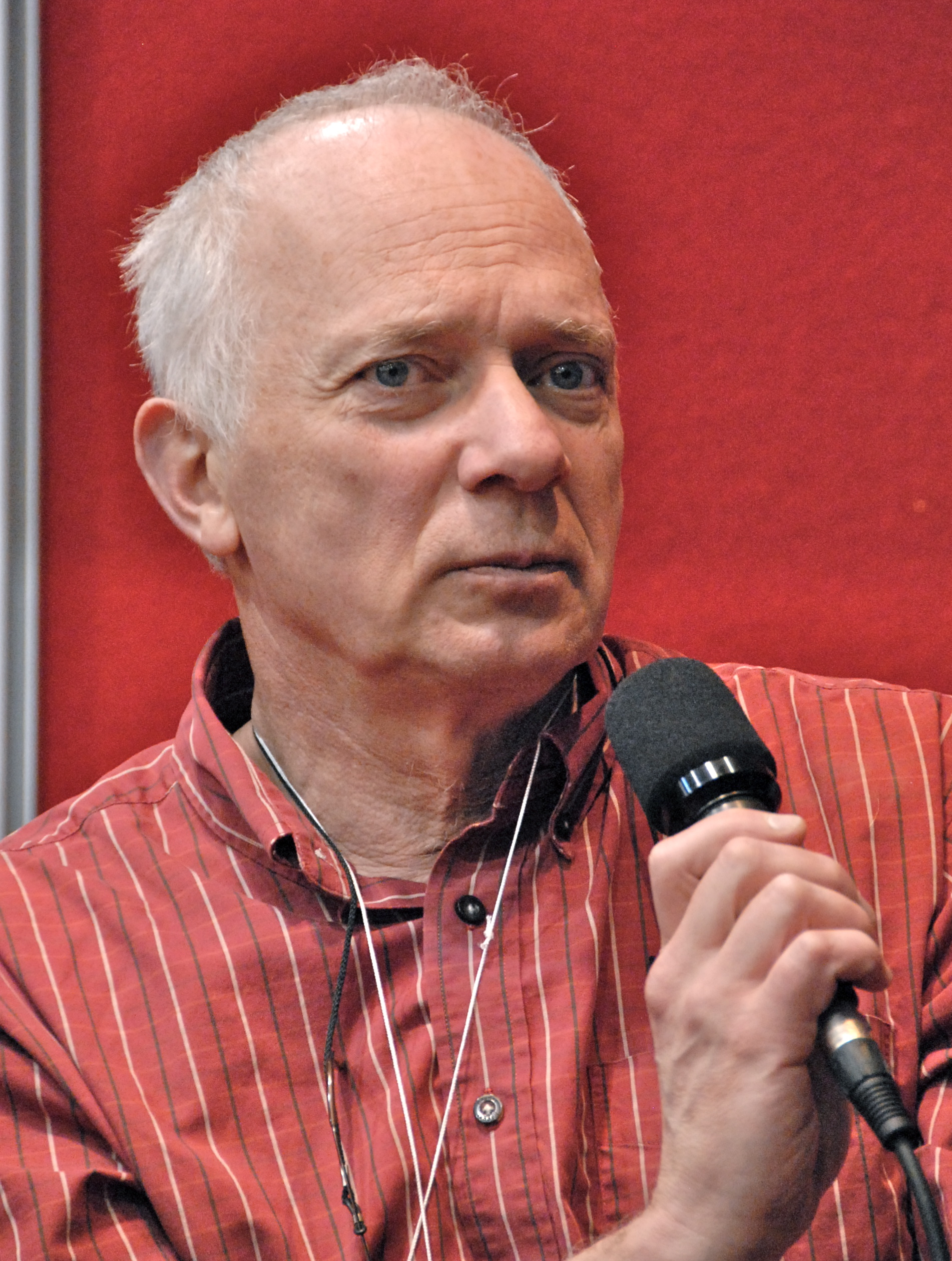
- Réal Godbout in 2012
- Born: Réal Godbout; Montreal, Quebec
- Occupations: Writer and illustrator
- Years active: 1970–present

Réal Godbout is a Quebec writer and comic book illustrator, best known for his Michel Risque and Red Ketchup series which he co-created with his long-time friend Pierre Fournier.

== Biography ==
In the 70's, Godbout published his comic strips in periodicals such as BD and L’Illustré, and in the daily Le Jour. He joined the magazine Croc with its first issue where, with his friend Pierre Fournier, he co-created, co-wrote and illustrated the Michel Risque and Red Ketchup series. Both series have been reprinted by La Pastèque of Montreal. More recently, his work has contributed educational strips to the young readers’ magazine Les Débrouillards, and he made headlines with his award-winning adaptation of Kafka’s novel Amerika. In 2015, collaborating with his daughter Adèle, Godbout wrote and illustrated a fable, Avant l’Apocalypse, and in 2023, he launched Heureux qui comme Ugo, a graphic novel that he co-created with his son Robin. Godbout was a teacher of comic art at the University of Québec in Outaouais.

Réal Godbout is currently working on the 10th album of Red Ketchup, as well as on the animated series based on the crazed FBI agent, along with director Martin Villeneuve.

== Awards ==
Both Réal Godbout and Pierre Fournier have received the Joe Shuster Award with their induction, individually, into the Canadian Comic Book Creators Hall of Fame. In 2016, they were formally listed among the “100 Indispensable Québec Authors” by the Maison de la Littérature in Québec City.
