= Cégep de Rivière-du-Loup =

Public college in Rivière-du-Loup, Quebec

- Cégep de Rivière-du-Loup
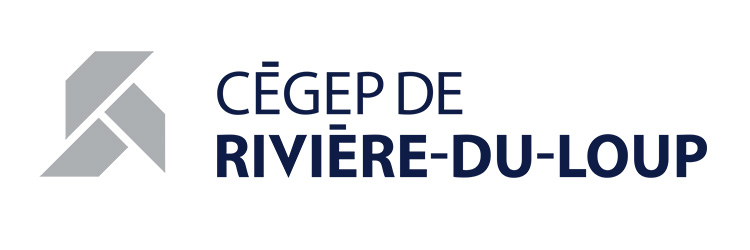
- Established: 1969
- Location: Quebec, Canada
- Website: www.cegep-rdl.qc.ca

The Cégep de Rivière-du-Loup is a college-level educational institution established in 1969 in Rivière-du-Loup, Quebec, Canada.

The institution offers 21 programs, including nursing, Emergency Medical Services and Early Childhood Education. Approximately 1,200 students enroll every year: 30% in the pre-university program, and 70% in the technical program. The college also offers continuing education courses for approximately 1,000 people in the Grand-Portage, Quebec region each year.

At this time, approximately 12,000 people have graduated from the Cégep de Rivière-du-Loup.

== Programs of study ==
=== Pre-university programs ===
- Social sciences and humanities
- Natural sciences
- Culture and communication (Liberal arts)
- Visual arts

=== Technical programs ===
- Nursing
- Emergency medical services
- Industrial electronics
- Early childhood education
- Recreational activities coordinator
- Administration (accounting and management)
- Web development
- Interior design
- Graphic design

== Campus facilities ==
- Student residence
  - Located in the main wing, the residence consists of 211 single and double rooms, some of which are wheelchair accessible.
  - Each room is equipped with an Internet connection, cable TV connection, a telephone, a sink and basic furnishings (bed, dresser, desk). Fridge rentals are available. The front desk is open 24 hours a day, and security staff are on site 24 hours a day. There is also a residence life advisor.
  - Residents have access to common areas such as a TV lounge, game room, laundry room, kitchens, storage space, mailboxes, and bike storage.
  - 9 ½ month leases are available.
- Cultural centre: a performance hall with close to 1,000 seats
- Eight-lane semi-Olympic sized swimming pool
- Athletic centre that includes gymnasiums, a fitness centre with weightlifting and cardio equipment, and rooms for dance classes, combat sports and racquetball
- Student café called "Le Carrefour"
- Library with audiovisual materials and a computer lab
- Centre for borrowing photographic and audiovisual equipment
- Childcare centre
- Coopsco for buying books and school supplies
- Art supply store offering student rates

=== Related articles ===
- CEGEP
- Rivière-du-Loup

=== External links ===
- Cégep de Rivière-du-Loup official website (in French)
