= The Bellybuttons =

French-Canadian comic book series

The Bellybuttons Les Nombrils
- Issue 3802 (February 2011) of Spirou magazine, featuring (left to right) Jenny, Karine (in her new look) and Vicky

Publication information
- Publisher: Dupuis (French); Cinebook (English)
- Format: Ongoing series, serialised in Safarir and Spirou magazines
- Genre: Graphic chick lit for Young adults
- Publication date: 2004 – 2018
- No. of issues: Number of albums: 8

Creative team
- Created by: Delaf and Dubuc
- Written by: Dubuc (Maryse Dubuc)
- Artist: Delaf (Marc Delafontaine)

The Bellybuttons (French: Les Nombrils, [le nɔ̃bʁil]) is a Canadian comics series written by Maryse Dubuc (credited as "Dubuc") and illustrated by her then husband, Marc "Delaf" Delafontaine. Dubuc and Delafontaine are based in Sherbrooke, Quebec.

== History ==
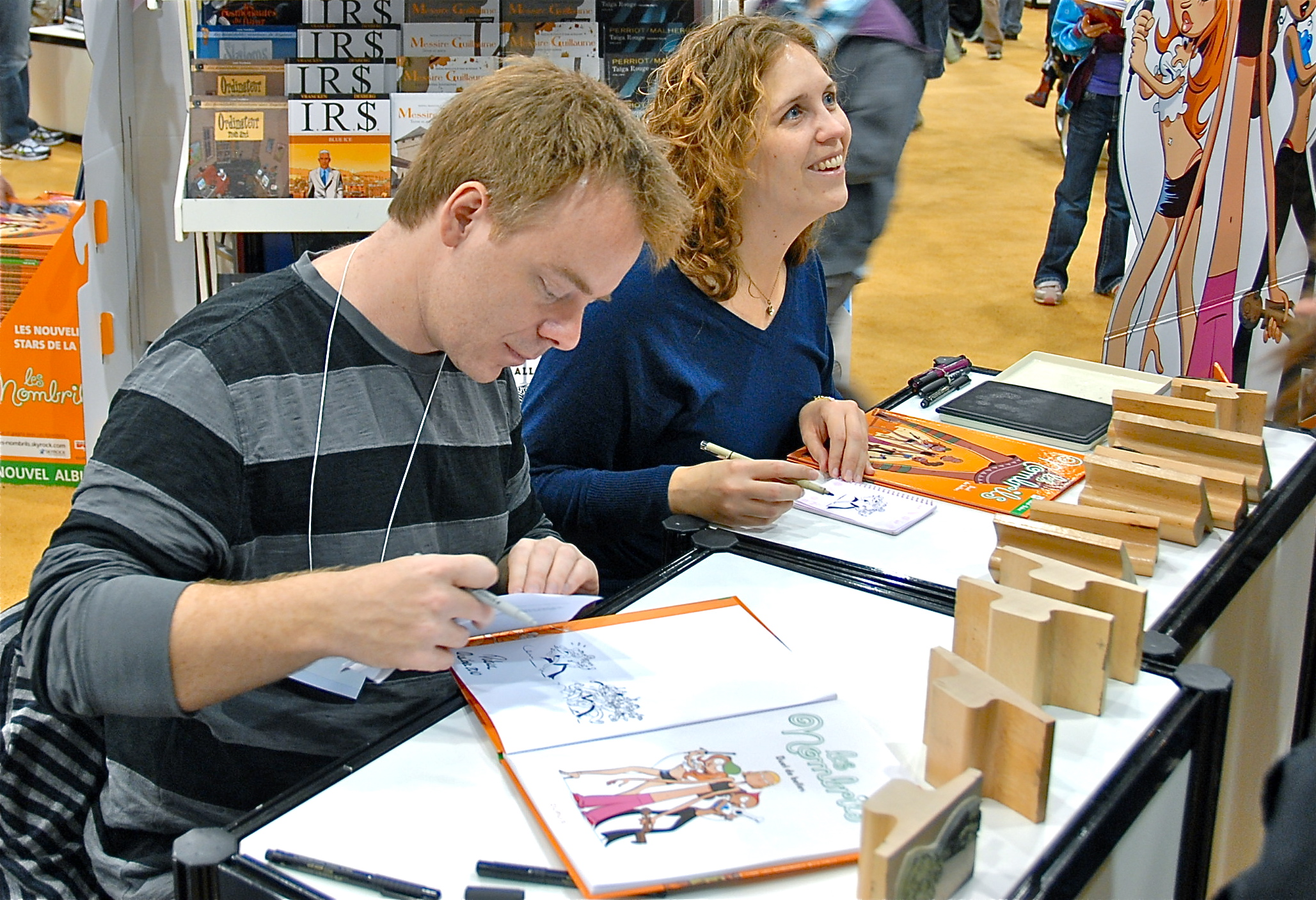
Artist Delaf (left) and writer Dubuc (right) at Salon international du livre de Québec in Quebec City, 2010

As Les Nombrils, the series was introduced in 2004 in issue #188 of the Québécois humour magazine Safarir; it was later picked up in 2005 by the Franco-Belgian comics magazine, Spirou. Spirou's publisher, Dupuis, published its first BD album, Pour qui tu te prends?, in 2006.

An English version of the series, with its title directly translated to The Bellybuttons, was introduced in 2009 by British publisher Cinebook.

By 2009, Les Nombrils has become one of the best-selling BD album titles on the market, with its third volume, Les liens de l'amitié, having sold over 220,000 copies.

The series was on hiatus from late 2009 until February 2011, when Les Nombrils returned to Spirou in issue 3802.

== Format ==
The series, characterized as "chick lit in graphic novel format" by Cinebook, focuses on three girls—two glamorous and vain, and one homely and down-to-earth—who test their friendships against popularity, boys and jealousy. To each other, they are considered frenemies—at times they help each other out, while at other times they compete for the same man.

In both languages, the name of the series is derived from the body piercing jewelry that the main characters Jenny and Vicky wear in their bellybuttons. The title also refers to Jenny and Vicky referring themselves as the "world's bellybutton".

The tagline for the series is "Life is Cruel. Deal with it." In the original French version, "La vie est cruelle. Et puis après ?" (Life is cruel. So what?)

== Characters ==
=== Main characters ===
Cover of the first "Bellybuttons" volume, Who do you think you are?: Jenny, Vicky and Karine (in her old look)

- Jenny is a redhead who dresses herself in glamorous and revealing clothes, which she generally acquires by stealing. She thinks that the world revolves around her and her looks. She is also not too smart, often turning to reference material to find answers to even the simplest questions. She also considers pets to be more fashion accessories than living beings. Unlike Vicky, Jenny isn't necessarily mean on purpose. It's more likely she simply doesn't realize she's hurting others. Her shallowness, pride, and obsession with looks, which stems from her mother's high standards, later causes her to face some life-changing decisions. Despite her glamour, Jenny lives with an impoverished family in a broken home—her mother is an alcoholic; her father's whereabouts are unknown when he is divorced or deceased; and so Jenny and her two younger siblings (Jenna and Willy) are left to look after themselves. Throughout the books she gets all boyfriends - John John, Fred, Jean Franky, and most recently Hugo, who, unlike the former three, is neither athletic nor attractive, but is the only one Jenny has truly loved.
- Vicky is an affluent Black brunette. She is supposedly less attractive than Jenny, but all the more spiteful and narcissistic. Where Jenny lacks in intelligence, Vicky lacks in compassion. However, this comes as no surprise once we get to know Vicky's family; her father is a successful bilingual businessman and a cheat, her mother a liar and a golddigger, and her older sister a spoiled bully. In her family of narcissists, Vicky is at the bottom of the hierarchy, as she still hasn't learned to speak English (French in the English version of the comics) fluently, even after spending almost every Summer at English camp, where she got bullied for her weight and hair. This emotional neglect from her abusive family and rejection by her surroundings left Vicky deeply scarred. In later volumes, she gets sent to the camp once again, this time along with the daughter of their new neighbours, the rebellious Mégane. At first she only hangs out with Mégane for her handsome brother James, who she has nothing in common with but wants to date for his wealth and status, as this would finally put her above her sister. But eventually, Vicky comes to realize it isn't James who she loves, but Mégane. However, for fear of being rejected by her parents again she denies and hides her feelings towards her, but this year, her parents finalized their divorce after her father was unfaithful and cheated on her, and after meeting the new wife (Jenny's mother) when they both moved out of the house.
- Karine is a very tall, thin, blonde-haired girl who's often the foil in Jenny and Vicky's jokes. She's very kind, smart, and hardworking, albeit naive and easily exploitable. Jenny and Vicky often ask her to do their homework for them, even going as far as guilt-tripping Karine into doing it, when she first refuses. During the first book, Karine finds herself a boyfriend, Dan, who Jenny and Vicky try to steal or at least keep away from her, in fear of losing her as their punching bag. Dan actively tries to convince Karine of her friends' toxic behaviour, but is mostly unsuccessful. After the events of book 4 that were exceptionally cruel to her, and with the help of her new boyfriend Albin, Karine drastically changes her look; dyeing her hair black and switching to a more-fashionable black colour scheme. And with her looks she changes her personality, gaining self-esteem and assertiveness. She also joins Albin's group as the lead singer, and later temporarily takes over. She devotes most of her free time to the band, which quickly grows in popularity, supposedly to compensate for all the time she spent living in Jenny and Vicky's shadows. Under Albin's influence she refuses to give the people who hurt her a second chance, such as Dan. She rejects whatever Dan tries to make up for his mistakes, but later it's revealed she still has feelings for him. This causes her relationship with Albin to hit a rough patch, which she tries to fix during volume 7. That's when she learns what Albin's been really doing to girls like her and their relationship possibly ends that time for good.

=== Supporting characters ===
- Dan is Karine's boyfriend in the first three volumes, who along with Karine is a target of Jenny and Vicky's schemes, as they attempt to pursue Dan away from Karine and more towards them. This of course isn't necessarily because the girls would want Dan for themselves, instead they do it because they don't want Karine to have any other friends besides them, especially not someone who realizes the girls treat Karine badly and might cut the ties between them. In attempt to show Karine there are better girls to be friends with, Dan turns to Mélanie. This sets off a series of events after which Dan is left confused and alone. With Karine getting a new boyfriend, Albin, and changing radically, Dan desperately tries to make things go back to how they were. He can't accept Karine's transformation and tries to prove Albin's intentions aren't as pure as he pretends they are. However, he's only right for all the wrong reasons and never manages to back his claims convincingly enough. After Albin manipulates Karine into a selfish act on Dan's expense, he gives up on trying and decides to go live with his father in New York, USA.
- John John is a male motorcyclist who Jenny and Vicky are obsessed with; he is rumoured not to know how to read, which is later debunked as he indeed does know how to read and write, albeit with extreme spelling errors, but chooses to pretend he can't to be able to stay at school longer. He is never seen without his motorcyclist helmet on. And for a good reason—John John is a Siamese twin, with part of his twin's head fused onto his own. Jenny and Vicky don't know the truth, but Karine does, as John John has decided to show her. She then tries to convince him to come clean, which he refuses and leaves the town for good.
- Murphy is a geekish, teenage boy, not treated well by puberty: his face is plagued with a bad case of acne, he talks with a hoarse voice (as indicated by fonts), and he always threatens suicide when he doesn't get his way—usually in the form of going out with Karine, who is too nice and naive to know he's guilt-tripping her. He's quite selfish and perverted, often harassing Jenny and Vicky and blackmailing them into kissing him. He's also a very good student, excelling both at Math and English, which Vicky uses to her advantage and has him do her English homework for her. However, Murphy never does anything just from the goodness of his heart and uses this opportunity as a way to blackmail Vicky again.
- Mélanie is a blonde-haired popular girl who devotes her life to charitable work and eco-activism. She seems to be kind at first but later we learn she is even more manipulative than Jenny and Vicky combined. She successfully pursues Dan into joining her on a study trip to Africa to help building a well there and the two get together. Originally, it was Karine who was supposed to come along, but Mélanie had an eye on Dan and decided to steal him for herself. Later, she keeps on silently tormenting Karine, who is desperate to explain her side of the argument, while hiding her true motives so well that nobody ever notices. And when the truth is close to being revealed she even goes so far as poisoning herself and framing Karine for it. Eventually though, with the help of Vicky and Jenny, Karine manages to prove Mélanie framed her and shows Dan what really happened, ridding herself of Mélanie once and for all. She then comes back again in later volumes, this time only playing a small part in the plot.
- Albin (Alain Delon) was originally an albino street musician who played original, personalized songs on his guitar. Following Karine's breakup with Dan, Albin becomes her new boyfriend and gets rewritten to be the leader of a four-piece member band named "Albin and the Albinos". He "helps" Karine get her life back together, turning her from a shy girl into a confident woman. He is also far more dedicated than Dan to cut Vicky out of Karine's life, going so far as to threaten her, which he denies in Karine's presence. Later Dan and Vicky, who don't approve of Albin, discover, that he used to be nicknamed "Le démon blanc" ("The White Devil"), as he was accused in the past, perhaps wrongly, of the murder of his classmates in a fire at a cottage one winter. Two of the survivors of the fire heard Albin say "Je vais faire un monde meilleur" ("I'm making the world a better place"); however, Albin and the survivor, who later became a member of Albin's band, said that it wasn't true. Vicky then gets targeted by a serial killer and the main suspect is Albin, as Mélanie, who was pushed of a bridge by said killer, reveals, that the murderer used the phrase "I'm making the world a better place." Albin is eventually cleared of the accusations and the real culprit is caught. In the final volume, we discover that Albin's turning Karine into a confident goth was no coincidence, but rather a habit Albin has, and that Karine was #12 on his list of "victims". This further damages the two's relationship, which was already very fragile after it turned out Karine still loved Dan.
- Mégane is a rebellious daughter of a wealthy family that moves into the house next to Vicky's. She is defiant, wears bold, punk clothes and talks back at her parents, which Vicky admires. She gets sent to the same camp as Vicky, where the two bond over being the only two teenage girls there. Mégane playfully teases Vicky, calling her "Barbie", which invigorates her, but she puts up with it to get closer to Mégane's brother, James. One night at the camp the two girls go for a dip in the river and Mégane ends up kissing Vicky, who rejects her, denying her feelings. Their friendship ends there and Vicky continues to pursue James. Mégane tries to convince her a few more times before easing down and joining Karine's band, befriending her in the meantime.
- James is Mégane's older brother. He's blond, tall, handsome, and dresses in a sophisticated fashion that matches his status. Vicky and her sister Rebecca compete over which of them will date him and despite Rebecca getting a head start, Vicky is the one eventually succeeding, using her mother's most valuable tool - lying. She pretends to share the same interests as him and James falls for it. Dating him gets consecutively more difficult as Vicky realizes who her heart's truly pining for.
- Jean Franky is Jenny's luscious boyfriend in volumes 6 and 7. He is as hot as he is stupid, possibly taking over Jenny's spot as the dullest character. He never wears a shirt, not even to high-end restaurant, constantly showing off his six-pack. His and Jenny's relationship is based on shallowness and pride and that makes Jenny deeply unhappy, however much she tries to deny it. After Jenny falls in love with Hugo, Jean Franky serves merely as her public boyfriend.
- Hugo was first introduced in volume 4 as the school's vice president and best friend of Fred, the school's president, and gets a much larger role in volumes 6 and 7. He's an overweight blond with a heart of gold and a loving, caring family. He was initially only attracted to Jenny for her looks, but after learning about Jenny's family situation and realizing there's so much more to Jenny than the eye meets, he truly falls in love with her. Jenny falls in love with him, too, but to keep her reputation she demands seeing him in secret. At first Hugo is fine with it, but later it begins to wear him down and he confronts Jenny in public. Unfortunately for both of them, Jenny's ego is stronger than her love for him.

== Awards ==
In 2010, Dubuc won the Joe Shuster Award in the "Outstanding Writer" category for her work in the fourth Les Nombrils album, "Duel de belles"; she was the first francophone winner in this category since the awards were created in 2005. She was first nominated in 2009 in the "Outstanding Writer" and "Outstanding Colourist" categories for her work in Les liens de l'amitié.

In 2011, this volume was chosen by Communication-Jeunesse as the book most-preferred by Québécois readers aged 12 to 17.

In 2012, Delaf and Dubuc were nominated for that year's Joe Shuster Award for the fifth volume, Un Couple D’enfer - Delaf for the Artist category, and Dubuc for the Writer category; neither won that year.

In October 2012, Delaf and Dubuc won the top prize in the Meilleur Album Jeunesse (Best Album for Young Readers) category for Un Couple D’enfer at the Festival Chambéry BD in Chambéry, France.

== Other languages ==
In addition to English, Les Nombrils has been translated into these languages. Unless specified, all translate to "Bellybuttons".

Language	Local Title	Publisher	Source
Czech	Pupíky	Albatros Media / CooBoo	
Slovak	Pupčeky	Albatros Media / CooBoo	
Danish	Navlerne	Egmont Serieforlaget (backup feature in "Tempo" magazine) -- Zoom Forlag	
Dutch	Mooie Navels ("Pretty Belly buttons")	Dupuis	
Icelandic	Skvísur	Froskur útgáfa	
Italian	Le Ombeliche		
Norwegian	Jentelus ("Cooties", lit. "girl lice")		
Spanish (Spain)	Ombligos	Dibbuks	
Swedish	Navelskådarna ("The Navel-gazers")	Mooz	

== Volumes ==
As of October 2013:

=== English ===
- The Bellybuttons: 1 - Who Do You Think You Are? (ISBN 9781905460885) May 2009
- The Bellybuttons: 2 - It's Ugly Out There! (ISBN 9781849180177) Feb. 2010
- The Bellybuttons: 3 - The Bonds of Friendship (ISBN 9781849180702) Feb. 2011
- The Bellybuttons: 4 - Clash of the Beauties (ISBN 9781849186780) May 2013
- The Bellybuttons: 5 - One Hell of a Couple (ISBN 9782800150222)
- The Bellybuttons: 6 - A Summer to Die For (ISBN 9782800157160)
- The Bellybuttons: 7 - An Almost Perfect Happiness (ISBN 9782800163536) September 2015
- The Bellybuttons: 8 - Ex, Dates and Rock'n'roll! (ISBN 9782800171579) November 2018

=== French ===
^{, unless specified.}

- Les Nombrils: 1 - Pour qui tu te prends ? (2006) (ISBN 9782800144122)
- Les Nombrils: 2 - Sale temps pour les moches (2007) (ISBN 9782800138749)
- Les Nombrils: 3 - Les liens de l'amitié (2008) (ISBN 9782800140315)
- Les Nombrils: 4 - Duel de belles (2009) (ISBN 9782800144122)
- Les Nombrils: Jeunes belles et vaches (2010) (ISBN 9782800148823) (omnibus volume; collects the first four albums)
- Les Nombrils: 5 - Un couple d'enfer (2011) (ISBN 978-2800150222) Available as a traditional album and as a three-part series:
  - Les Nombrils: 5, 1^{er} partie - Noir cauchemar (ISBN 978-2800149899)
  - Les Nombrils: 5, 2^{e} partie - Rouge enfer (ISBN 978-2800150284)
  - Les Nombrils: 5, 3^{e} partie - Blanc albinos (ISBN 978-2800150376)
- Les Nombrils: 6 - Une été trop mortel! (2013)
- Les Nombrils: 7 - Un bonheur presque parfait (2015)
- Les Nombrils: 8 - Ex, drogue et rock'n'roll ! (2018)
