= Maryse Dubuc =

Canadian comics writer

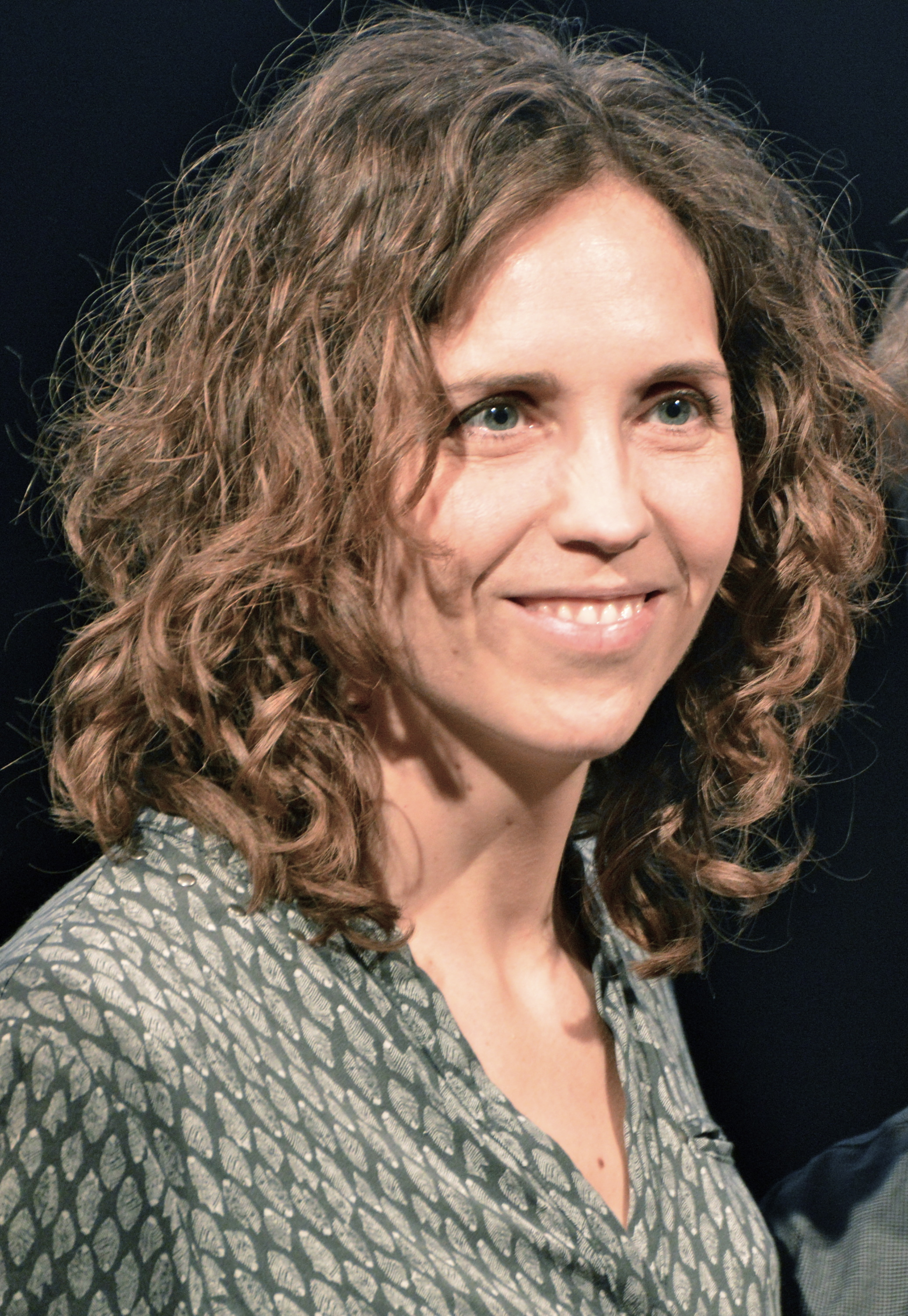
- Born: October 21, 1977 (age 49) Compton, Quebec, Canada
- Area: writer
- Notable works: The Bellybuttons
- Awards: full list

Maryse Dubuc (French pronunciation: [maʁiz dybyk]; born 21 October 1977) is a Canadian comics writer, known particularly for The Bellybuttons which she created with Marc Delafontaine ("Delaf").

== Early life ==
Maryse Dubuc was born in Compton, Quebec, growing up at a dairy farm. She studied French literature at the Cégep de Sherbrooke, and communication at the Université du Québec à Montréal. She would later meet Delaf in Sherbrooke.

== Career ==
Dubuc started working as a colourist, working with publishers like Vents d'Ouest and Editions 400 Coups.

At the same time, she wrote novels for young readers for Bayard Presse and Pierre Tisseyre.

With Delaf, she created the comic series The Bellybuttons (French title: Les Nombrils) for Safarir, a Québécois humour magazine, and Spirou, the weekly Franco-Belgian comics magazine published by Dupuis that later picked up the comic series. So far, eight albums and one intégrale compilation have appeared. Translated albums have appeared in Dutch (Dupuis), English (Cinebook) and Czech (Cooboo), and translations in magazines exist in Italian (in Cioè), Danish (Tempo), Greek (Katerina) and Norwegian (Girls). By 2009, the French edition of the 3rd album of Les Nombrils sold over 220,000 copies.

== Bibliography ==
=== Comics ===
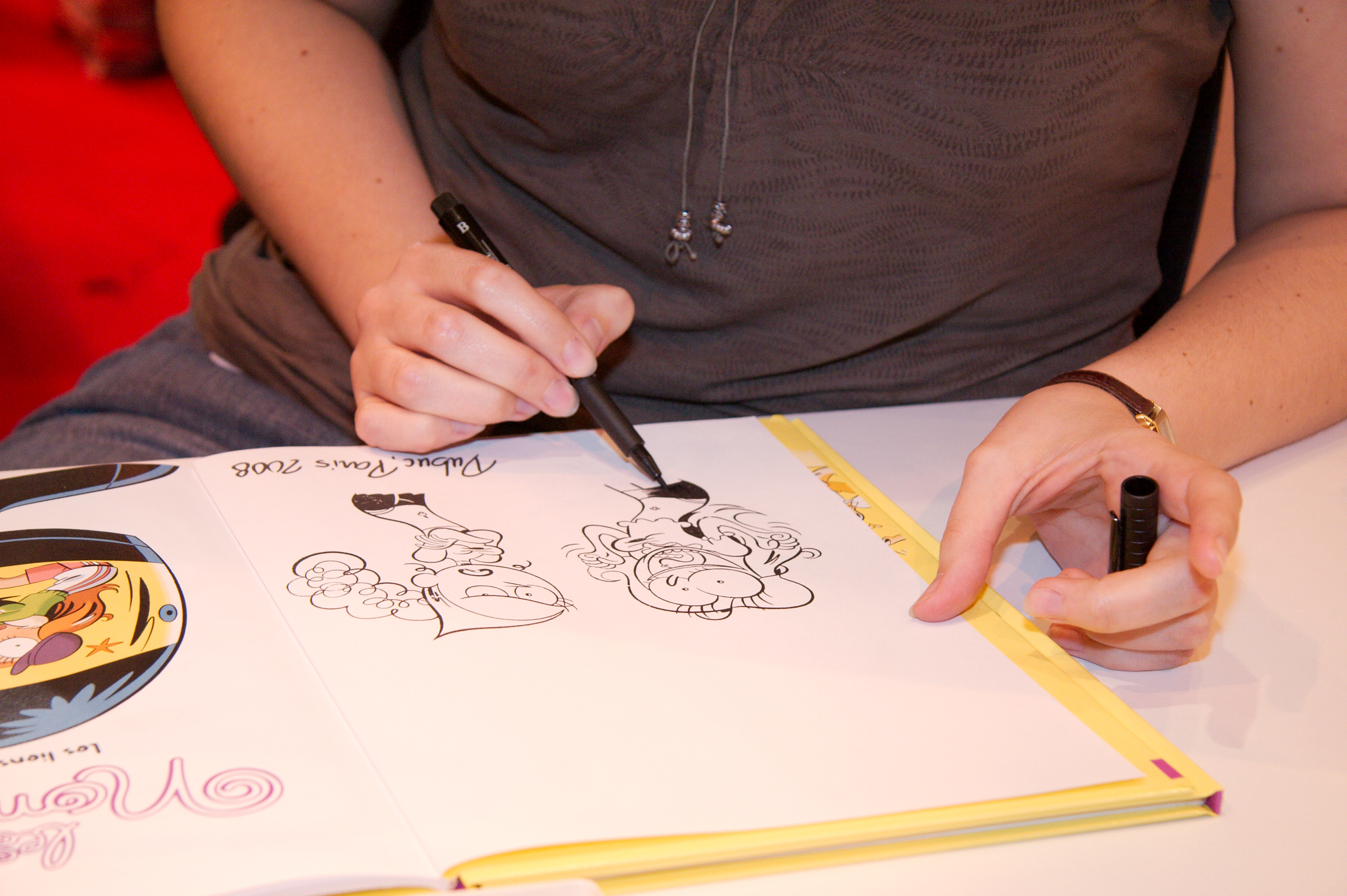
Dubuc signing a Les Nombrils album at the Salon du livre 2008 (Paris, France)

- Pete Kevlar (one-shot album, 1999, Mille-Îles), colours by Dubuc, art by Makoello, writing by Jean-Louis Roy
- Le guide junior pour bien élever les parents (one-shot album, 2005, Vents d'Ouest): colours by Dubuc, art by Delaf, writing by Jacky Goupil
- Les Nombrils (8 albums, 2006–2018, Dupuis): writing and colouring by Dubuc, art by Delaf

=== Books ===
- Lexibul (4 booklets, 2002, Modulo)
- La fille parfaite (2003, Vents d'Ouest)
- Le Gâteau gobe-chagrin (2004; Pierre Tisseyre)
- Ma Voisine est une vedette (2004, Vents d'Ouest)
- Vert Avril (2005, Vents d'Ouest)
- La deuxième vie d'Alligato, (2005, Pierre Tisseyre)
- Le père Noël qui ne croyait plus aux enfants (2006, Bayard)
- Aventurier intergalactique (2006, Bayard)
- Aventurier des mers (2007, Bayard)

== Awards ==
- 2007: Prix Bédéis Causa - Albéric Bourgeois from the Festival de la BD francophone de Québec for Les Nombrils 1: Pour qui tu te prends ?
- 2007: Livres préférés des jeunes, Communication-Jeunesse, Réseau CJ for Les Nombrils 1
- 2008: Livres préférés des jeunes, Communication-Jeunesse, Réseau CJ for Les Nombrils 2: Sale temps pour les moches
- 2008: Nominated for the Joe Shuster Awards for Outstanding Writer and Outstanding Colorist for Les Nombrils 2
- 2009: Prix Bédéis Causa - Albéric Bourgeois from the Festival de la BD francophone de Québec for Les Nombrils 3: Les liens de l'amitié
- 2009: Nominated for the Joe Shuster Awards for Outstanding Writer and Outstanding Colourist for Les Nombrils 3
- 2010: Joe Shuster Award for Outstanding Writer for Les Nombrils 4: Duel de belles. Also nominated for best cover and best colouring.
- 2010: Livres préférés des jeunes, Communication-Jeunesse, Réseau CJ for Les Nombrils 3
