= Delaf =

Comics writer and illustrator (born 1973)

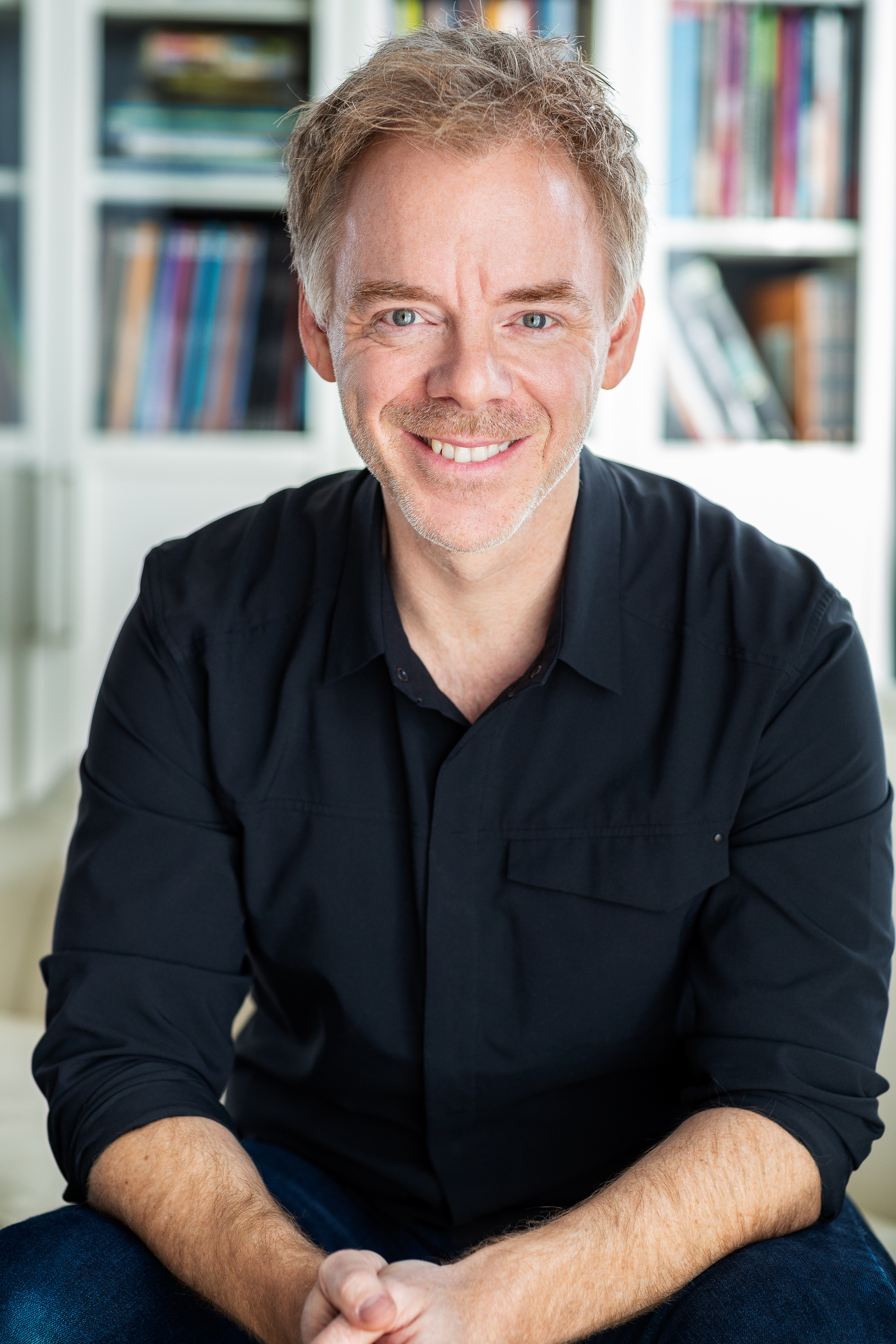
- Delaf, photographed in 2022
- Born: Marc Delafontaine; October 9, 1973 (age 53) Sherbrooke, Quebec, Canada
- Areas: Writer, illustrator, animator, storyboard artist
- Notable works: The Bellybuttons
- Collaborators: Maryse Dubuc
- Spouse: Maryse Dubuc (separated 2021)

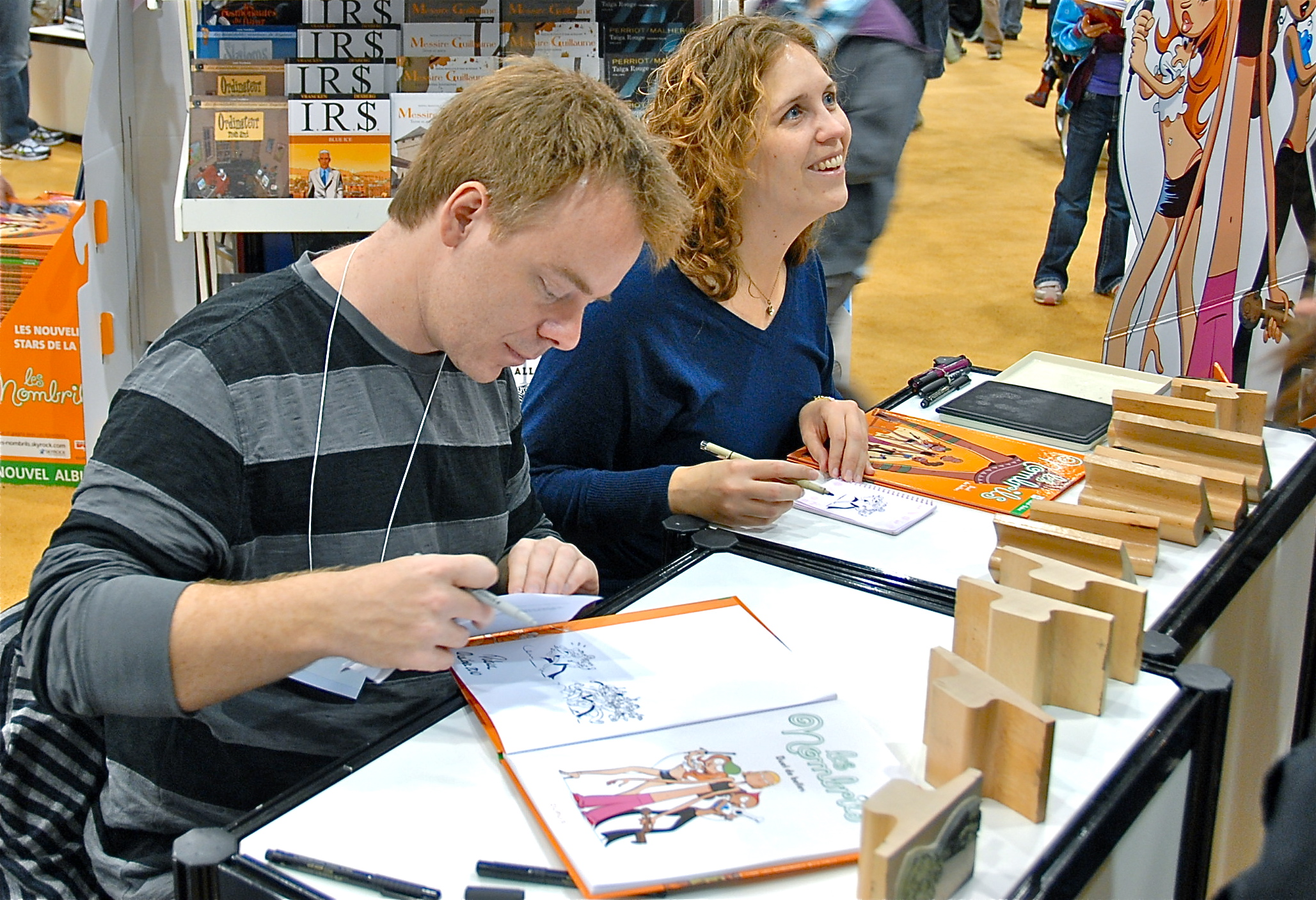
Delaf (left) and Dubuc (right) at Salon international du livre de Québec in Quebec City, 2010

Delaf (the pen name of Marc Delafontaine, born October 9, 1973) is a Québécois comic strip writer, cartoonist, animator and scriptwriter. His is best known for his work in The Bellybuttons (Les Nombrils), a comics feature that he co-created with his then wife, Maryse Dubuc.

== Biography ==
Born in Quebec in 1973, Marc Delafontaine initially began his career working for the animation studio CINAR as an animator, layout artist and storyboarder for such shows as Caillou and The Little Lulu Show Afterwards, he would later move on to working as an illustrator, illustrating brochures meant to teach French as a second language.

In 2004, Delaf and Dubuc would co-create Les Nombrils, a comic strip that focuses on the social life of three teenage girls, for the Québécois humour magazine, Safarir. The following year, Spirou, a Franco-Belgian comics magazine, would pick up the strip, which they carried ever since. However, in 2021, production on the comic came to a halt when coauthor Dubuc separated from Delaf, thus leaving the comic on an indefinite hiatus.

=== Gaston Lagaffe Reboot ===
At the 2022 Angouleme Festival, publisher Dupuis announced that they were rebooting the Gaston Lagaffe comic with Delaf as writer. A new album with a print run of over a million copies was scheduled for October 2022. Although André Franquin, the original author, transferred the rights to the character to his company Marsu Productions in 1992, Dupuis bought the rights in 2013. In March 2022, Isabelle Franquin, André’s daughter and curator of his estate, went to the courts of Brussels to oppose the new comic, which she considered to be an act of fraudulent plagiarism. This would later be settled out of court.

== Bibliography ==
=== Comics series ===
- The Bellybuttons (Les Nombrils), written and coloured by Dubuc (2004–2021)
- Gaston Lagaffe (Gomer Goof), (2022-present)

=== Contributions ===
- Le Guide junior pour bien élever ses parents, Goupil & Douyé & Dubuc, Éditions Vents d'Ouest, Collection Le guide junior (March 2005) (ISBN 2749302137)
- Le père Noël qui ne croyait plus aux enfants, written by Dubuc, Éditions Vents d'Ouest (ISBN 978-2-89579-104-1, 2-89579-104-X)
