= Albert Chartier =

French-Canadian cartoonist and illustrator

- Born: 16 June 1912 Montreal, Quebec, Canada
- Died: February 21, 2004 (aged 91) Joliette, Quebec, Canada
- Area: Cartoonist
- Notable works: Onésime

Albert Chartier (16 June 1912 – 25 February 2004) was a French-Canadian cartoonist and illustrator, best known for having created the comic strip Onésime.

== Biography ==
Albert Chartier was the son of Joseph Chartier, a traveling salesman who lived in the United States, an employee of the company Lowney's. He inherited his father's innate sense for business practice and perfect command of English which enabled him to become a comic artist of international caliber. Boasting a bilingual family, Albert Chartier decided to perfect his English by entering the Montreal High School because, in the late 1920s, English was an essential tool for any young person who dreamed of escaping poverty that touched so many Canadian homes. After high school, he made an attempt at the offices of an insurance company to find out after one day that paperwork was not for him.

Charles Maillard, Director of the School of Fine Arts in Montreal, was a regular at the Chartier home and encouraged the young Albert to pursue the arts. Early in his classes, Chartier appreciated the rigor and perfectionism of his teachers as they responded very well to his expectations. But he soon discovered that the more traditional medium of fine art did not suit him. In this conservative and elitist environment, illustration and comics were rather seen as popular art forms, not of artistic value. At fifteen years of the Refus Global, which would seriously shake the art scene and question many concepts, the middle of Fine Arts was largely conservative and Chartier accommodated its evil. His penchant for illustration were already being felt, he lamented that they did not even mention in his courses some of the modern artistic techniques as applied to figurative art that particularly interested him.

On 25 October 1935, Chartier landed his first professional contract with his first comic, the Sunday BouBoule, published in La Patrie until 21 March 1937, scripted by journalist René Boivin.

In 1940, Chartier left Québec for New York for almost two years, producing humorous cartoons on a freelance basis, including for Big Shot Comics magazine published by Columbia Comics. After the attack on Pearl Harbor, the United States entered the World War and, as his renewed work permit meant he could be forced to join the U.S. Army, Chartier decided to return home, where offers were not long to wait for. The first contract was from the Wartime Information Board in Ottawa in which he made comics and panel gags in government publications distributed to entertain the soldiers.

Chartier's Onésime was the longest-lived Québec comic strip

In 1943, one of his cousins offered Chartier the chance to appear in the Bulletin des agriculteurs ("Farmers' Bulletin") as an illustrator. He then engaged in illustrating the stories of Gabrielle Roy, as well as novels and short stories. In November that year, he was offered the opportunity to create a comic strip. Chartier's comic strip Onésime lasted 59 years, from November 1943 until June 2002. He also created Séraphin for the same paper. In 1991, Onésime was to be dropped following the sale of the magazine to Maclean Hunter, but an outcry arose among the sales representatives and especially among the public of the Bulletin, and the idea was quickly abandoned. Inspired by the rural audience targeted by the magazine, his own family and social experiences of the picturesque Saint-Jean-de-Matha, with Onésime Chartier created a chronicle of country life and, implicitly, a history of the evolution of the mentality and society of Québec.

From 1963 to 1964, Chartier's Les Canadiens was distributed by the Toronto Telegram News Service across Ontario and Québec. This was a bilingual, historical strip. He also contributed a weekly gag cartoon to the Radio-monde for about twenty years, and did about 100 full-colour painted covers for Le Samedi and La Revue in the 1940s and 1950s.

Chartier died 25 February 2004.

== Bibliography ==
- (in French) Les aventures d'un Québécois typique - Onésime, tome 1. Éditions de L'aurore, 1974
- (in French) Les aventures d'un Québécois typique - Onésime, tome 2. Éditions de L'aurore, 1974
- (in French) Ses plus amusantes aventures publiées dans le bulletin des agriculteurs ces derniers 40 ans - Onésime. Éditions La compagnie de publication rurale inc., 1983
- (in French) Une piquante petite brunette. Les 400 coups, 2008. (collected comic strips)
- (in French) Séraphin illustré, in collaboration with Claude-Henri Grignon. Les 400 coups, 2010
- (in French) Onésime : Les meilleures pages. Les 400 coups, 2011
