= Safarir =

Former Canadian periodical

- Editor in Chief: Michel Bouchard
- Categories: Comics; Humour
- Frequency: Monthly
- Publisher: Éditions Les Artistocrates
- Founder: Sylvain Bolduc; Serge Boisvert DeNevers
- Founded: 1987
- First issue: October 1987
- Final issue: July 2016
- Country: Canada
- Based in: Montreal
- Language: French
- Website: www.safarir.com
- ISSN: 0835-7919

Safarir is a defunct Canadian French-language humour magazine. The name is derived from "safari" and French "ça fait rire", "it makes you laugh". It was in circulation between 1987 and 2016

== History and profile ==
Safarir was established in 1987 by Serge Boisvert deNevers and Sylvain Bolduc. It was published monthly in Quebec City from October 1987 until 2001, and thereafter in Montreal by Éditions Les Artistocrates.

Notable writers and artists who contributed to Safarir included Éric Thériault; and Delaf and Dubuc, whose Les Nombrils was introduced in Safarir in 2004. The magazine ceased publication in July 2016.

In 1997, Safarir was published in English all around North America under the name NUTS.

== See also ==
- Canadian comics
- Quebec comics
