= Mira Falardeau =

French Canadian historian, professor and author of comic strips

- Born: 1948 (age 77–78); Ottawa, Ontario, Canada
- Education: Laval University (M.A.); University of Paris (Ph.D.)
- Occupations: Historian, professor, comic writer

Mira Falardeau (born 1948) is a French Canadian historian, professor, and author of comic strips (French: bande dessinée, BD). Falardeau has devoted works to Québec animated films, Québec comic strips and caricatures in Québec, focusing on visual humour in all its forms. She taught as a professor of cinema and communication at Laval University and the University of Ottawa. Falardeau has also curated exhibitions in the visual arts and operated a small publishing house.

== Biography ==
Falardeau graduated with a master's degree in art history from Laval University in Québec in 1978. Her thesis was L'Humour visuel: un modèle d'analyse visuelle des images comiques (English: Visual Humour: A Model for Visual Analysis of Comic Images).

As a comic book author, Falardeau began in 1974 by publishing in the Québec newspaper Mainbasse and the following year in its supplement, Perspectives. From 1976 to 1980, she produced a monthly strip in the Montréal magazine Châtelaine and continued her collaborations with Le Fil des événements (Québec) and CWS / CF Les cahiers de la femme (Toronto). In 1982, she collaborated on the magazine Le Temps fou (Montréal) and from 1984 to 1987 with La Vie en rose. magazine.

In 1981, Falardeau obtained her Ph.D. from the Institute of Aesthetics and Art Sciences at the University of Paris (a.k.a. The Sorbonne). Her thesis was La bande dessinée faite par les femmes en France et au Québec depuis 1960 (The comics made by women in France and Québec since 1960).

Falardeau was a professor of cinema, communication and French at Laval University (1975–1976 and 1992), the University of Ottawa (1983–1984), at Cégep de Sainte-Foy (1987–1989) and Cégep de Limoilou (1997–2005).

Falardeau has published several articles on the subject of comics in various newspapers and magazines. Falardeau helped found the Société des créateur(trice)s et ami(e)s de la bande dessinée (Society of Creators and Friends of Comics, ScaBD) in 1985, and was the organization's president and spokesperson for several years. She is also a member of the Observatoire de l'humor, a group dedicated to research on humour in all its forms.

In 1993, she founded Éditions Falardeau, a small publishing house that published most of her husband's collections, author André-Philippe Côté. It ceased operations in 1998, after selling its fund to Éditions Soulières.

Falardeau has worked to legitimize comics as a recognized art form and as a tool for democracy and peace. She curated many exhibitions, including Les aventures de la bande dessinée québécoise au musée du Québec (The Adventures of the Québec Comic Strip at the Québec Museum) on the 100th anniversary of Québec comics (1997).

Her Histoire de la caricature au Québec (History of Caricature in Québec), co-written with Robert Aird, received two awards in 2010: the 3rd prize of the political book of the presidency of the National Assembly of Quebec in April and the grand prize of the National Assembly awarded by Revue d'histoire de l'Amérique française in October.

Since 2008, Falardeau has devoted herself to humorous carvings on wood and mixed mediums.

== Major works ==
=== Comic strips ===
- Publications in the magazines Châtelaine (1970s) and La Vie en rose (1980s).
- Falardeau, Mira (1985). Et vlan! On s'expose... [And wham! We're exposing ourselves...] (in French). ScaBD.
- Falardeau, Mira (2000). La Mercière assassinée [The murdered Mercière] (in French). Montréal: Soullères.

=== Books ===
- Falardeau, Mira (1994). La bande dessinée au Québec [Comics in Québec] (in French). Montréal: Editions du Boréal.
  - Augmented and updated reissue under the title Histoire de la bande dessinée au Québec [History of Comics in Québec] (in French). Montréal: VLB. 2008. p. 192.
- Falardeau, Mira (2006). Histoire du cinéma d'animation au Québec [History of animated cinema in Québec] (in French). Montréal: VLB.
- Falardeau, Mira; Aird, Robert (2009). Histoire de la caricature au Québec [History of Caricature in Québec] (in French). Montréal: VLB.
- Falardeau, Mira (2014). Femmes et humour [Women and Humour] (in French). University of Laval Press.
- Falardeau, Mira (2015). Humour et liberté d'expressio [Humor and Freedom of Expression] (in French). University of Laval Press. p. 184.

Falardeau, Mira (2020). L'art de la bande dessinée actuelle au Québec, Quebec, University of Laval Press

Falardeau, Mira (2020). A History of Women Cartoonists, Toronto, Mosaic Press. Augmented and updated reissue under the title Femmes et humour.

=== Exhibitions as guest curator ===
- Les Aventures de la bande dessinée québécoise, Museum of Québec, 1997–1998
- André-Philippe Côté, du bon côté, Maison Hamel-Bruneau, 2003
- Les débuts de la bande dessinée québécoise de 1904 à 1908, Bibliothèque et Archives nationales du Québec, 2004
- Dessine-moi un jeu- des jeux dans les journaux aux jeux vidéo, Le Grand Rire, 2006
- André-Philippe Côté, un certain côté de Québec, Bibliothèque de Charlesbourg, 2007
- Les histoires en images: ancêtres de la BD, Grande Bibliothèque de Montréal, 2008
- Manga: art du mouvement et Raconte-moi un manga, Grande Bibliothèque de Montréal, 2011–2013
- L'arme du rire: Caricature et liberté d'expression, Bibliothèque Gabrielle-Roy, Québec, 2015

== See also ==
- Female comics creators
- Quebec comics
