= Les 400 coups (publisher) =

Canadian publisher

- Founded: 1995
- Country of origin: Canada
- Headquarters location: Montréal, Québec
- Publication types: Books, Comics
- Imprints: Mécanique générale Coups de tête
- Official website: https://www.editions400coups.com/

Éditions Les 400 Coups is a French-language publisher of books for children. It was founded in 1995 and is based in Montréal, Québec, Canada.

In 2020, Les 400 Coups won the Bologna Prize for the Best Children's Publishers of the Year for North America.
