= Éditions Mille-Îles =

Canadian French-language comics publisher

- Founded: 1988
- Country of origin: Canada
- Headquarters location: Québec
- Publication types: Books, Comic books

Éditions Mille-Îles (French pronunciation: [edisjɔ̃ mil il]) is a Canadian French-language publisher of comics founded in 1988.

== History ==
Mille-Îles began in 1988 with Tristan Demers' Gargouille, a series for children, and the adult comics album La Vie qu'on mène by Line Arsenault. They have since expanded into a wide variety of genres, and have a number of imprints. By the beginning of the 21st century, they had become the largest Québec-based publisher of comics.

== Imprints ==
Mille-Îles has a number of imprints:

- BD Mille-Îles – specializes in children's comics
- Coup de Griffe – specializes in humour
- Dérive (later Fondation)
- Zone Convective – founded by Yves Millet, bought by Mille-Îles in 1999

== See also ==
- Canadian comics
  - Quebec comics
