= Croc (magazine) =

Canadian French-language humour magazine

- Editor in Chief: Pierre Huet
- Categories: Comics, Humour
- Frequency: Monthly
- Publisher: Éditions Ludcom
- Founder: Jacques Hurtubise
- First issue: October 1979
- Final issue: April 1995
- Country: Canada
- Based in: Montreal
- Language: French
- ISSN: 0226-6083

Croc was a French-language humour magazine published monthly in Montreal, Quebec, Canada from 1979 until 1995.

== Publication history ==
Croc ("Fang" in French) was begun in October 1979 by Jacques Hurtubise, Hélène Fleury, and Roch Côté, with the help of an $80,000 grant from the ministère des Affaires culturelles du Québec ("Québec Ministry of Cultural Affairs"). It printed the work of many leading cartoonists of the era, many of whom were able to launch their careers through the magazine's help, including animator Claude Cloutier.

Croc begat another magazine, Titanic, dedicated entirely to comics. Croc's publishers briefly distributed a localised edition of MAD magazine from 1991 to 1992, which adapted and translated existing MAD articles by replacing New York City references with Montreal ones.

For a number of reasons, Croc ceased publication in April 1995 after 189 issues.

== See also ==
- Canadian comics
- Quebec comics
- Safarir
