= San Francisco Comic Book =

Underground comix anthology series

- Cover of San Francisco Comic Book #1 (San Francisco Comic Book Company, 1970), art by Rory Hayes.

Publication information
- Publisher: San Francisco Comic Book Company; Print Mint; Last Gasp
- Schedule: Irregular
- Format: Standard
- Genre: Underground
- Publication date: Jan. 1970 – March 1983
- No. of issues: 7

Creative team
- Created by: Gary Arlington & Don Donahue
- Artist(s): Joel Beck, Roger Brand, Joel Burnham, Robert Crumb, Kim Deitch, Melinda Gebbie, Justin Green, Rick Griffin, Bill Griffith, Rory Hayes, Greg Irons, Mervinius, Willy Murphy, Dan O'Neill, Jim Osborne, Larry Rippee, Trina Robbins, Barry Siegel & Bruce Simon, Spain Rodriguez, Larry Welz, Robert Williams, S. Clay Wilson
- Editor(s): Gary Arlington

San Francisco Comic Book was an underground comix anthology published between 1970 and 1983. Conceived of and edited by Gary Arlington, the anthology highlighted the work of many of San Francisco's top underground talents, including Bill Griffith, Robert Crumb, Kim Deitch, Justin Green, Rory Hayes, Willy Murphy, Jim Osborne, Trina Robbins, and Spain Rodriguez.

San Francisco Comic Book was the brainchild of Gary Arlington. Over the years the shaky finances of San Francisco Comic Book Company, required him to enlist the help of fellow Bay Area publishers Print Mint and Last Gasp in getting the book printed.

== Publication history ==
The first issue of San Francisco Comic Book was published by editor Arlington's own San Francisco Comic Book Company. Issues #2 and #3 were published by the Print Mint "for the San Francisco Comic Book Company". Issue #4 was published by the Print Mint.

After a seven-year hiatus, issue #5 was co-published by the Print Mint and Last Gasp (although it was still copyrighted by the San Francisco Comic Book Company). Issue #6 was "produced" by the San Francisco Comic Book Company and published by Last Gasp. Issue #7 was published by Last Gasp.

== Overview ==
Gary Arlington operated the San Francisco Comic Book Company as a retailer and soon enough a publisher. By late 1969, his store was a nexus for local underground talent, and San Francisco was well on its way to becoming a Mecca for underground cartoonists from all over the country. Arlington determined to publish an anthology showcasing the work of the local underground cartooning community, and thus was born San Francisco Comic Book.

Arlington recruited Don Donahue of Apex Novelties to co-edit the first issue of the anthology. The two publishers then recruited cartoonists Rory Hayes, Willy Murphy, Larry Welz, Jack Jackson, and Jim Osborne — all credited as co-editors — to bring in more talent. As a result, issue #1 featured work from four members of the Zap Comix crew: Crumb, S. Clay Wilson, Spain, and Rick Griffin.

Issue #4 featured contributions from three members of the Air Pirates collective: Bobby London, Gary Hallgren, and Ted Richards. The lead Air Pirates instigator, Dan O'Neill, had work in issues #1 and 2. That same issue featured an 8-page supplement called Dogbite Magazine with illustrations of vicious dogs by Spain Rodriguez, Roger Brand, Kim Deitch, Bill Griffith, Jay Lynch, Michael McMillan, Rory Hayes, and Jay Kinney.

== Issue guide ==
#	Date	Publisher	Cover artist	Contributors	Notes
1	Jan. 1970	San Francisco Comic Book Company	Rory Hayes	Rory Hayes, Willy Murphy, Larry Welz, Jaxon, Jim Osborne, Robert Crumb, Ric Sloane, S. Clay Wilson, Dan O'Neill, Leonard Rifas, Dave Sheridan, Spain Rodriguez, Mervinius, Rick Griffin, Robert Dougherty	Donahue, Hayes, Murphy, Welz, Jaxon, and Osborne credited as co-editors.
2	Mar./Apr. 1970	Print Mint	Greg Irons	Rick Griffin, Willy Murphy, Greg Irons, Robert Williams, Kim Deitch, Jim Osborne, Spain Rodriguez, Trina Robbins, Robert Crumb, Dan O'Neill, Larry Welz, Mervinius, S. Clay Wilson	Published "by the Print Mint for the San Francisco Comic Book Company".
3	August 1971	Print Mint	Robert Crumb	Kim Deitch, Greg Irons, George Metzger, Willy Murphy, Trina Robbins, Justin Green, Jim Osborne, Robert Crumb	Co-edited by Deitch, Donahue, Hayes, Murphy, Jaxon, Osborne, and Welz.
4	October 1973	Print Mint	Willy Murphy	Jim Osborne, Jeffery Hayes, Bill Griffith, Justin Green, Larry Rippee, Bobby London, Gary Hallgren, Landon Chesney, Leslie Cabarga, Gary King, Michael McMillan, Joe Schenkman, Ted Richards, Robert Crumb, Rory Hayes	
5	Jan. 1980	Print Mint/Last Gasp	Willy Murphy	Jim Osborne, Larry Todd, John Burnham, Jay Lynch, Trina Robbins, Rory Hayes, Bill Griffith, Joel Beck, Kim Deitch, Robert Williams	
6	Feb. 1981	Last Gasp	Roger Brand	Roger Brand, Barry Siegel & Bruce Simon, Chris Mettz, Larry Rippee, Joel Beck, Spain Rodriguez, John Burnham, Hank Kingfish, Melinda Gebbie, Justin Green	52 pages
7	March 1983	Last Gasp	Spain Rodriguez	Larry Rippee, Terry Boyce, Barry Siegel, Roger Brand, John Burnham, Tom Crow, Melinda Gebbie, Adam Cornford, Steve Mills, Bill Griffith, Spain Rodriguez, Kim Deitch, Dori Seda, Bruce Simon, Steve LeClair, Willy Murphy, Ron Turner, Joel Beck	68 pages
