= Company & Sons =

Underground comix publisher

- Status: defunct, 1973
- Founded: 1970
- Founders: Nick Cohn; John Bagley
- Country of origin: U.S.A.
- Headquarters location: San Francisco, California
- Distribution: Head shops
- Key people: Rory Hayes; Dan O'Neill; Charles Dallas; Vaughn Bodē; Bobby London; Larry Todd
- Publication types: Comic books
- Fiction genres: Underground comix
- Imprints: Cocoanut Comix (an imprint of the Air Pirates collective) Cloud Comix

Company & Sons was an early underground comix publisher based in San Francisco, run as a cooperative. The company operated from 1970 to 1973, publishing a total of 15 titles, all but one of them consisting of a single issue.

Company & Sons was the first publisher of the long-running anthology Young Lust, edited by Jay Kinney & Bill Griffith. Other creators associated with Company & Sons included Rory Hayes, Dan O'Neill, Charles Dallas, Vaughn Bodē, Bobby London, and Larry Todd.

== Company structure ==
Company & Sons operated "with many hats and many roles. [Their] projects include[d] publishing [their] own books, job printing, marketing of novelty items such as incense, hand-screened tee shirts, and essences, and cinema, too...." After hitting hard times in 1973, the cooperative "...attempt[ed] to reorganize in a more businesslike way, using capitalist formalities but avoiding the exploitation its members associated with most businesses." The intention was to "incorporate into a profit-sharing corporation, with emphasis on non-leadership and anarchy in business."

== History ==
Company & Sons burst onto the underground comix scene in 1970 with five titles. First was Rory Hayes' Bogeyman Comics #3 (taking over the title from the San Francisco Comic Book Company), then Wink Boyer's Buzzard, Boyer & Dave Geiser's Honky Tonk, and the anthology Hee Hee Comics (which was produced "in conjunction with The San Francisco Comic Book Co., Gary E. Arlington, prop").

But the company hit pay dirt in October 1970 with Kinney & Griffith's Young Lust, which had been previously turned down by fellow San Francisco-based underground publishers Print Mint, Rip Off Press, and Last Gasp. The first printing of 10,000 copies sold out almost immediately, leading to more printings and more sales. Despite the first issue's success, however, Griffith and Kinney were dubious about Company & Son's accounting practices, so they brought issue #2 to Print Mint. The bulk of Young Lust's run was ultimately published by Last Gasp.

In 1971 Company & Sons published three issues of Dan O'Neill's Comics and Stories and Larry Todd's Tales of the Armorkins. In 1972 the company published the All Duck anthology, Vaughn Bodē's The Collected Cheech Wizard, Bobby London's The Dirty Duck Book, editor Bill Surski's Drool Magazine anthology, the anthology Paranoia, and the first issue of Charles Dallas' Psychotic Adventures Illustrated (issues #2 [Oct. 1973] and #3 [June 1974] were picked up by Last Gasp). In 1973 the company published Paul McKenna's Folk Funnies.

The company went out of business in late 1973; reportedly, publisher Bagley claimed he had a fatal disease. After the demise of Company & Sons, Bagley's partner Michael R. Levy moved to Texas and founded Texas Monthly.

Very little is documented about Bagley other than he was an avid collector of Classics Illustrated. He was seen in 2001 by Last Gasp publisher Ron Turner, where Bagley was making jewelry while based on a farm in Northern California.

== Titles ==
all one issue unless indicated otherwise

- All Duck (1972) — contributors include Tom Hatchman ("Mickey Pickles"), Peter Bramley, Joey Epstein ("Noah Escarole"), Jay Kinney, Ned Sonntag, Denny Hermanson, and Bill Skurks
- Bogeyman Comics #3 (1970) — contributors include Rory Hayes, Jack Jackson, Jay Lynch, Simon Deitch, Spain Rodriguez, Rick Griffin, Geoffrey Hayes, and Greg Irons
- Buzzard (1970)
- The Collected Cheech Wizard (1972) — first two printings by Company & Sons; 3rd printing by Print Mint
- Dan O'Neill's Comics and Stories (3 issues, 1971) — later picked up by Comics and Comix
- The Dirty Duck Book (March 1972)
- Drool Magazine (1972) — contributors include Bill Surski, Tom Hatchman ("Mary Pickles"), Gail Burden, Ralph T. Reese & Larry Hama, Jay Kinney, Peter Bramley, Stephen Barnett, Ned Sonntag, Joey Epstein, Larry Todd, and Chris Rush
- Folk Funnies (1973)
- Hee Hee Comics (1970) — contributors include Larry Rippee, Hector Tellez, D. Angstead, Tom Veitch & Rick Veitch, Leonard Rifas, Roger Wade Boyce, Casey, Al Devoren, and Ric Sloane
- Honky Tonk (1970) — contributors include Dave Geiser, Wink Boyer, and Diana
- Paranoia (1972) — 10,000 copies; contributors include Larry S. Todd, Charles Dallas, Sharon Goodyear, Robert Silverberg, Michael C. Smith, and Patricia Moodian
- Psychotic Adventures Illustrated #1 (1972) — 10,000 copies; contributors include Charles Dallas and Sharon Goodyear; title later continued by Last Gasp
- Tales of the Armorkins (Dec. 1971) — 20,000 copies
- Whizz Comix (1970)
- Young Lust #1 (Oct. 1970) — later issues picked up by the Print Mint
