= Gary Arlington =

Key figure in the underground comix movement

- Born: Gary Edson Arlington; October 7, 1938 San Jose, California, US
- Died: January 16, 2014 (aged 75) San Francisco, California, US
- Areas: Publisher, retailer, artist
- Notable works: San Francisco Comic Book Company; San Francisco Comic Book

Gary Edson Arlington (October 7, 1938 – January 16, 2014) was an American retailer, artist, editor, and publisher, who became a key figure in the underground comix movement of the 1960s and 1970s. As owner of one of America's first comic book stores, the San Francisco Comic Book Company, located in San Francisco's Mission District, Arlington's establishment became a focal point for the Bay Area's underground artists. He published comics under the name San Francisco Comic Book Company, as well as publishing and distributing comics under the name Eric Fromm (not connected to the German critical theorist). Cartoonist Robert Crumb has noted, "Gary made a cultural contribution in San Francisco in the late 1960s, through the '70s, '80s & '90s that was more significant than he realizes."

== Biography ==
=== Early life ===
Julian Guthrie, in the San Francisco Chronicle, described the youthful Arlington's art interests:

The fascination with comic books began when Arlington was six years old. His father, who worked at a lumberyard in Hayward, stopped at a store on Fruitvale Avenue in Oakland and bought ten comic books. There were funny-looking animals, men who looked like melting monsters, and women who were distressed and barely dressed. "I remember the funny animals," he said. "And I remember my mother taking me to a theater where I saw an animated Superman. My mother was really good to me."

=== San Francisco Comic Book Company ===
The San Francisco Comic Book Company logo

In 1968, Arlington was down on his luck, penniless and essentially homeless. The closure of his parents' house forced him to sell his extensive personal comics collection, which included many rare comics from the era's Golden Age as well as a trove of EC Comics. Arlington opened the San Francisco Comic Book Company, located in San Francisco's Mission District at 3339 23rd Street, in April that year. It soon became a focal point for the Bay Area's underground artists. (The Bay Area itself was a Mecca for underground cartoonists from all over the country.) Lambiek's Comiclopedia offers this description of the artistic avenues provided by Arlington:

As guru and "godfather" of underground comics, he encouraged and directed many artists on their path to publication. His tiny 200-square-foot store became the underground nexus where artists met, discussed projects and exchanged ideas. Employees at Arlington's store included Simon Deitch, Rory Hayes, and Flo Steinberg.

Arlington also published some important early underground titles, including the first two issues of Robert Crumb's Mr. Natural. He published a number of experimental minicomics by Art Spiegelman.

Arlington was particularly devoted to the underground anthology San Francisco Comic Book, which featured the work of many of the region's top talents, including Bill Griffith, Robert Crumb, Kim Deitch, Justin Green, Rory Hayes, Willy Murphy, Jim Osborne, Trina Robbins, and Spain Rodriguez. Arlington published the first issue himself and the next two with the assistance of fellow Bay Area publisher the Print Mint. Arlington edited all seven issues of San Francisco Comic Book (the final issue appearing in 1983) even when the title was taken over by Print Mint and later Last Gasp.

As the San Francisco Comic Book Company, Arlington published comics sporadically from 1968 to 1972 and photocopied minicomics from 1970 to c. 1980. One of his last publishing projects (published under the Eric Fromm brand) was Nickel Library, a weekly series of single-page homages to EC Comics by an ever-changing list of contributors from underground comix and the mainstream. 64 pages were produced by 1973 before former EC publisher William M. Gaines sent Arlington a cease-and-desist letter and he was forced to give it up.

Comix creators published by Arlington included Crumb, Spiegelman, Joel Beck, Roger Brand, John Burnham, Melinda Gebbie, Justin Green, Rory Hayes, Hank Kingfish, Chris Mettz, Larry Rippee, Dori Seda, Barry Siegel, Bruce Simon, Spain, Ron Turner, and S. Clay Wilson. Arlington closed his store in 2002.

=== Later life ===
Arlington lived in an apartment at 225 Berry Street in San Francisco before moving to the Mission Creek Senior Community apartment complex for low-income or disabled seniors.

=== Death ===
On January 17, 2014, Arlington's death was announced on the San Francisco Bay Guardian Online website. He was 75 years old and died "from complications of diabetes, heart disease, obesity, and [a previously] crushed leg. Ron Turner, founder of Last Gasp Press, talked about his death, his ailing health, and how "The comic community will remember Gary as founding one of the first comic book stores in America, on 23rd st. in the Mission."

== Books and exhibitions ==
Arlington's art was exhibited in Art Almighty, a group exhibition at the 111 Minna Gallery, San Francisco, in March–April 2011. Arlington's artwork was collected in the book I Am Not of This Planet: The Art of Gary Edson Arlington, published by Last Gasp in 2011.

== Titles published ==
=== Comics ===
- All Stars #2 (1970) — taking over from All Stars #1 (1965, Golden Gates Features); copyright by Marty Arbunich/Bill DuBay
- Bogeyman Comics (2 issues; Fall 1968–1969) — Rory Hayes
- Ebon (January 1970) — Larry Fuller; considered by many to be the first comic book title to star a black superhero (Marvel's Black Panther predating Ebon but not having his own title)
- Hee Hee (1970) — anthology published in conjunction with Company & Sons
- Man from Utopia (1972) — Rick Griffin
- Moonchild Comics #2 (1969) — Nicola Cuti
- Mr. Natural (2 issues; Aug. 1970–Oct. 1971) — Robert Crumb; series later continued by Kitchen Sink Press
- Ric Sloane Comics (1969?) — R. K. Sloane
- San Francisco Comic Book #1 (1970) — series continued by Print Mint; contributors include Rory Hayes, Willy Murphy, Larry Welz, Jack Jackson, Jim Osborne, Robert Crumb, Ric Sloane, S. Clay Wilson, Dan O'Neill, Leonard Rifas, Dave Sheridan, Spain Rodriguez, Mervinius, Rick Griffin, Robert Dougherty
- Thrilling Murder Comics (1971) — contributors include Simon Deitch, Greg Irons, Jim Osborne, S. Clay Wilson, Bill Griffith, Robert Crumb, Kim Deitch, and Spain Rodriguez

=== Zines and minicomics ===
- Armpit of Fear (1972) — Scott Shaw
- Attic Sentinel Prometheus Bound Over (1972) — David Lee Anderson & Nancy Senauke
- Awake! (1972)
- Buck Boy (1976) — Rory Hayes?
- Cholo (1980) — Roger Brand
- Coching Komiks (1976) — Manuel Auad, Danny Bulanadi
- The Compleat Mister Infinity (1970) — minicomic by Art Spiegelman
- Eric Fromm's Comics and Stories (1973) — Leslie Cabarga, Larry Rippee, Trina Robbins
- First Empire Funnies (c. 1973) — Pat Daley ("Kleine Reich Funnies")
- Jam-Jar! (1972) — Larry Bigman, Scott Shaw, David Gibson, John Pound, Roger Freedman, Phil Yeh
- Modern Medical Romances (1972) — 8-p. minicomic by Leslie Cabarga
- No Matter How Thin You Slice It It's Still Baloney! (1972) — minicomic by Larry Rippee
- Nickel Library (1972–1973) — original contributions from Alex Toth, Arnold Roth, Bill Edwards, Bill Griffith, Bill Plimpton, C. C. Beck, Charles Dallas, Cliff Sterrett, Dave Geiser, Disney Studios, Don Towlley, Frank Frazetta, George, Harrison Cady, Harvey Kurtzman, Jack Davis, Jaxon, Jack Kirby, Jay Kinney, Jim Chase, Jim Osborne, Justin Green, Kim Deitch, Larry Todd, Michele Brand, Murphy Anderson, Reed Crandall, Rick Griffin, Robert Crumb, Roger Brand, Rory Hayes, Simon Deitch, Wallace Wood, Will Eisner, Winsor McCay
- Plain Talk (1972) — Leslie Carbaga
- Reefer Madness (1972) — by "Steve Mad" (Stephen Madaio)
- Sally Star Hollywood Gal Sleuth (1972) — Trina Robbins
- Self Destruct: Bulletin of the Suicide Liberation Front (1973?) — Art Spiegelman and Bill Griffith
- Stoned Picture Parade (1975) — random collection of drawing & cartoons by Robert Crumb, Becky Wilson, Spain Rodriguez, Edna Jundis, Will Eisner, Rick Griffin, S. Clay Wilson, and Rory Hayes
- Zip•a•Tunes and Moire Melodies (1972) — Art Spiegelman
