= Arcade (comics magazine) =

Underground comics anthology

Arcade: The Comics Revue
- Arcade #1, artwork by R. Crumb.

Publication information
- Publisher: Print Mint
- Schedule: Quarterly
- Format: Oversize
- Genre: Underground
- Publication date: Spring 1975 – Fall 1976
- No. of issues: 7

Creative team
- Created by: Art Spiegelman & Bill Griffith
- Written by: Steve Anker, Charles Bukowski, William S. Burroughs, Samuel Coleridge, David Cohen, George DiCaprio, Will Fowler, J. Hoberman, Paul Krassner, Jane Lynch, Michael Reynolds
- Artist(s): Robert Armstrong, Mark Beyer, Michele Brand, M. K. Brown, Harrison Cady, Oliver Christianson (aka Revilo), Robert Crumb, Kim Deitch, Justin Green, Bill Griffith, Geoffrey Hayes, Rory Hayes, Gerald Jablonski, Jay Kinney, B. Kliban, Aline Kominsky, George Kuchar, Bill Lynch, Jay Lynch, Curt McDowell, Michael McMillan, Victor Moscoso, Willy Murphy, Diane Noomin, James Osborne, Spain Rodriguez, Gilbert Shelton, Art Spiegelman, Lulu Stanley, Robert Williams, S. Clay Wilson
- Editor(s): Art Spiegelman & Bill Griffith

Arcade: The Comics Revue is a magazine-sized comics anthology created and edited by cartoonists Art Spiegelman and Bill Griffith to showcase underground comix. Published quarterly by the Print Mint, it ran for seven issues between 1975 and 1976. Arriving late in the underground era, Arcade "was conceived as a 'comics magazine for adults' that would showcase the 'best of the old and the best of the new comics'". Many observers credit it with paving the way for the Spiegelman-edited anthology Raw, the flagship publication of the 1980s alternative comics movement.

Well-known creators who contributed to the anthology include R. Crumb, Kim Deitch, Jay Kinney, Aline Kominsky, Jay Lynch, Spain Rodriguez, Gilbert Shelton and S. Clay Wilson.

== Overview ==
By the mid-1970s, the underground comix movement was encountering a slowdown, and Spiegelman and Griffith conceived of Arcade as a "safe berth". It stood out from similar publications by having an ambitious editorial plan, in which Spiegelman and Griffith attempted to show how comics connected to the broader realms of artistic and literary culture. Arcade also introduced comic strips from ages past, as well as contemporary literary pieces by writers such as William S. Burroughs and Charles Bukowski, and illustrated nonfiction pieces by writers like Paul Krassner and J. Hoberman.

== Publication history ==
Spiegelman and Griffith, based in the San Francisco Bay Area — the epicenter of the underground movement — originally conceived of a comics magazine for adults in c. 1971, planning to call it Banana Oil as an homage to Milt Gross (who originated the non-sequitur as a phrase deflating pomposity and posing). The publisher, Company & Sons, they approached about it, but was unable to make it a reality.

Some years later, in Spring 1975, with the help of Print Mint, they were able to launch the magazine as Arcade. Soon after, however, co-editor Spiegelman moved back to his original home of New York City, which put most of the editorial work for Arcade on the shoulders of Griffith and his cartoonist wife, Diane Noomin. This, combined with distribution problems, retailer indifference, and a general failure to find a devoted audience, led to the magazine's 1976 demise.

== Contributors ==
Contributors to every issue of Arcade included Spiegelman, Griffith, Robert Armstrong, Robert Crumb, Justin Green, Aline Kominsky, Michael McMillan, Diane Noomin, and Spain Rodriguez. Crumb illustrated five of the seven front covers. Each issue contained a reprint of work by a cartoonist from the medium's Golden Age, including H. M. Bateman, Harrison Cady, Billy DeBeck, Milt Gross, and George McManus. Each issue's title page contained individual self-portraits by the contributors.

== Issue guide ==
#	Date	Cover artist	Back cover artist	Contributors	Notes
1	Spring 1975	Robert Crumb	Victor Moscoso	Aldo Bobbo (Robert Armstrong), Robert Crumb, Kim Deitch, Will Fowler, Justin Green, Bill Griffith, Jay Kinney, Aline Kominsky, Paul Krassner, George Kuchar, Jay Lynch, Curt McDowell, Michael McMillan, Willy Murphy, Diane Noomin, James Osborne, Spain Rodriguez, Gilbert Shelton, Art Spiegelman, and S. Clay Wilson; plus a Harrison Cady reprint	
2	Summer 1975	Robert Crumb	Art Spiegelman	Armstrong, David Cohen, Crumb, Deitch, Green, Griffith, Rory Hayes, Kinney, Kominsky, Krassner, Kuchar, Lynch, McMillan, Murphy, Noon, Osborne, Shelton, Spain, and Spiegelman; plus a W. E. Hill reprint	
3	Fall 1975	Robert Crumb	Gilbert Shelton	Armstrong, Charles Bukowski/Crumb, Sally Cruikshank, Green, Griffith, Hayes, Denis Kitchen, Kominsky, Kuchar, Jane Lynch, McMillan, Murphy, Noomin, Jim Osborne, Joe Schenkman, Shelton, Spain, Spiegelman, Wilson; plus a Milt Gross reprint	
4	Winter 1975	Robert Crumb	Justin Green	Armstrong, William S. Burroughs, Crumb, Deitch, Green, Griffith, Hayes, J. Hoberman, Kominsky, Bill Lynch, Curt McDowell, McMillan, Murphy, Noomin, Michael Reynolds, Schenkman, Shelton, Spain, Spiegelman, Robert Williams, Wilson; plus a George McManus reprint	
5	Spring 1976	Jay Lynch	Robert Williams	Armstrong, Michele Brand, M. K. Brown, Dirk Burhans, Crumb, Deitch, George DiCaprio, Green, Griffith, Hayes, Hoberman, Kominsky, McDowell, McMillan, Murphy, Noomin, Spain, Spiegelman, Wilson, Williams; plus a Billy DeBeck reprint	
6	Summer 1976	Robert Crumb	Michael McMillan	Armstrong, Mark Beyer, Brown, Crumb, Deitch, Green, Griffith, Geoffrey Hayes, Hayes, Hoberman, Gerald Jablonski, Kominsky, McMillan, Murphy, Noomin, Larry Rippee, Spain, Spiegelman, Wilson; plus a H. M. Bateman reprint	Includes a tribute to the recently deceased Willy Murphy by Ted Richards.
7	Fall 1976	M. K. Brown	B. Kliban	Armstrong, Beyer, Brand, Oliver Christianson (aka Revilo), Crumb, Deitch, Green, Griffith, Rory Hayes, Hoberman, B. Kliban, Kominsky, McMillan, Noomin, Spain, Lulu Stanley, Williams; plus "Sex Comics of the Thirties" (Tijuana bible) section	

== Legacy ==
Although short-lived, Arcade still has admirers. Famed comics writer Alan Moore said it was "the only truly worthwhile material produced during the 1970s". With the general waning of the underground scene, however, Spiegelman despaired that comics for adults might fade away for good. Frustrated with editing his peers because of the tension and jealousies involved, for a time Spiegelman swore he would never edit another magazine. Nonetheless, by 1980, Spiegelman and his wife/collaborator Françoise Mouly launched Raw, a "graphix magazine", hoping their unprecedented approach would bypass readers' prejudices against comics and force them to look at the work with new eyes.
