= Print Mint =

American underground comic book publisher

The Print Mint, Inc.
- Founded: 1965; 61 years ago
- Founder: Don Schenker and Alice Schenker
- Defunct: 1978 (as publisher; continued as a poster shop, Reprint Mint, which closed in 2016)
- Headquarters location: 830 Folger Avenue, Berkeley, California, and San Francisco, California
- Distribution: Self-distribution
- Key people: Bob Rita and Peggy Rita
- Publication types: Comic books, posters
- Nonfiction topics: Social commentary, politics, environmentalism
- Fiction genres: Underground comix

The Print Mint, Inc. was a major publisher and distributor of underground comix based in the San Francisco Bay Area during the genre's late 1960s-early 1970s heyday. Starting as a retailer of psychedelic posters, the Print Mint soon evolved into a publisher, printer, and distributor. It was "ground zero" for the psychedelic poster. The Print Mint was originally owned by poet Don Schenker and his wife Alice, who later partnered in the business with Bob and Peggy Rita.

== History ==
=== Berkeley retailer ===
Don and Alice Schenker started The Print Mint as a picture-framing shop and retailer of posters and fine art reproductions on Telegraph Avenue in Berkeley, California, in December 1965, originally sharing a store with Moe's Books, but later on moving into a separate location down the block.

Moe's Books owner, Moe Moskowitz, and the Schenkers had been friends back in New York City during the 1950s Beat era, so this association was a continuation of that connection. Schenker's first comic book release was a reprint of Joel Beck's self-published Lenny of Laredo, published by the Print Mint in April 1966.

=== Berkeley poster wholesaler ===
The Print Mint soon opened a wholesale division, publishing and distributing posters. The dance venues at The Avalon Ballroom and The Fillmore were advertised by posters designed by artists Stanley Mouse, Rick Griffin, Alton Kelley, Victor Moscoso, and others. These posters were soon in much demand, and The Print Mint distributed many of them along with work by Peter Keymack, Hambly silkscreens, Solo Period posters, M. C. Escher prints, Neon Rose, Bob Frieds Food line, and many others.

=== Haight, San Francisco retailer ===
In December 1966, the Print Mint opened a second store on Haight Street, in the Haight Ashbury district of San Francisco, in a building that Moskowitz had purchased to install a bookstore. The city refused to give Moskowitz a permit to sell used books, so his plan was never realized. 1967 was an eventful time, and the store became a center of neighborhood activities and a main source of countercultural information and creative energy to the huge influx of young people coming into San Francisco that summer. It grew from being a simple retailer into a complex cross-country distribution and then publishing operation. In December, however, Moskowitz forfeited the building and his plans for a second location for Moe's Books, bringing a demise to Print Mint in San Francisco.

=== Berkeley underground comics wholesaler ===
Beginning in 1968, but really getting going in 1969, publishing and distribution of underground comics became The Print Mint's major endeavor. With their partners the Ritas (employees that the Schenkers had offered a partnership to in 1967), Don did the organizing, editing, and layout of the books, working with the artists. Bob and Peggy Rita and Alice handled the distribution and the day-to-day operations of the business. Bob Rita had previously run Third World Distribution out of a Haight Street location. Alice also oversaw the Berkeley store. The company's main office was located at 830 Folger Avenue in Berkeley.

The first comix Print Mint published was the (initially) weekly tabloid Yellow Dog, edited by Don Schenker. They also re-issued Gilbert Shelton's Feds 'n' Heads, which he had initially self-published. Eventually, the Print Mint published such underground comix notables as Robert Crumb, Trina Robbins, Rick Griffin, S. Clay Wilson, Victor Moscoso, Gilbert Shelton, Spain Rodriguez, and Robert Williams. Titles they published included Zap Comix, Junkwaffel, Bijou Funnies, and Moondog. In addition, they published one of the first ecologically themed comics, The Dying Dolphin, a solo effort by rock poster artist Jim Evans with contributions by Ron Cobb and Rick Griffin.

As the first publisher to invest heavily in the underground comix movement (and its distribution), the Print Mint was instrumental in the form's popularity and widespread reach in the late 1960s and early 1970s. As they were growing the market and putting money in the hands of the cartoonists, however, their business practices were called into question by a number of the more popular artists. A few of those, including Gilbert Shelton and Frank Stack, broke off in early 1969 to form their own publisher, Rip Off Press, taking some of the more established cartoonists with them. The 1973–1974 venture Cartoonists Co-Op Press was formed out of a similar motivation. From that point on, the Print Mint focused more on bringing new talent into the burgeoning underground industry.

The Print Mint's bold experiment with Arcade: The Comix Revue, started in 1975 and edited by Art Spiegelman and Bill Griffith, with most issues sporting a cover by R. Crumb, paved the way for RAW! just a few years later.

=== Underground comics "pornography" arrest ===
The Print Mint weathered a lawsuit filed over the publication of Zap Comix, particularly issue No. 4 (published in 1969). The Schenkers were arrested and charged with publishing pornography by the Berkeley Police Department. Previous to that, Simon Lowinsky, owner of the Phoenix Gallery on College Avenue in Berkeley, had organized an exhibition of the Zap collective's original drawings, and had been arrested on the same charge. His case came to trial first. He was acquitted after supportive testimony from Peter Selz, a prominent figure in the art world. At that point, the city dropped the charges against the Print Mint.

=== Retail and wholesale split ===
By 1975 the partnership with the Ritas was not going smoothly. Alice Schenker says that an agreement was made to split the business between retail and wholesale, the Schenkers taking the retail store — "Reprint Mint" — and the Ritas the wholesale and publishing. The Print Mint ceased publishing comics in 1978, with the last two titles published being the comics anthologies Lemme Outta Here, edited by Diane Noomin, and The Human Drama, edited by Jim Madow.

The retail poster shop continued. In 1985 the Schenkers sold the retail store. Reprint Mint closed in late November 2016.

== Titles published ==
- All Girl Thrills (1971) — all female contributors: Trina Robbins, Barbara "Willy" Mendes, and Julie Wood (a.k.a. Jewel and a.k.a. Julie Goodvibes)
- American Flyer Funnies (1972), #1 — anthology title including Larry Welz; #2 published by Last Gasp as American Flyer (1973)
- Arcade (7 issues, 1975–1976) — magazine-sized comics anthology created and edited by Art Spiegelman and Bill Griffith. Contributors included Spain Rodriguez, Justin Green, Kim Deitch, Robert Crumb, and Charles Bukowski.
- Bent (1971) — S. Clay Wilson
- Bijou Funnies #1-4 (1969–1970) — anthology with early work by Jay Lynch, Art Spiegelman, Gilbert Shelton, and Skip Williamson; #1 reprinted from The Bijou Publishing Empire; issues #5-8 picked up by Kitchen Sink Press along with reprints of #1–4
- The Book of Raziel (1969) — John Thompson
- Bum Wad (1971) — Dave Geiser; published by Geiser's Yahoo Productions and distributed by the Print Mint
- The Captain (1972) — Hak Vogrin and Jean Einback Vogrin
- Clowns (1972) – Dave Geiser; published by Geiser's Yahoo productions and distributed by the Print Mint
- Captain Guts (3 issues, 1969–1971) — Larry Welz
- The Collected Cheech Wizard (1972) — Vaughn Bode; reprinted from a Company & Sons title
- Color (1971) - Victor Moscoso
- Coochy Cooty Men's Comics (Dec. 1970) — Robert Williams
- Demented Pervert (1971) — Dave Geiser; published by Geiser's Yahoo Productions and distributed by the Print Mint
- Despair (1969) — Robert Crumb
- Deviant Slice Funnies (2 issues, 1972–1973) — Tom Veitch & Greg Irons
- The Dying Dolphin (1970) — Jim Evans
- El Perfecto (1973) — Timothy Leary Benefit
- Feds 'n' Heads (1968) — reprint of Gilbert Shelton self-published comic
- Girl Fight Comics (2 issues, 1972–1974) — Trina Robbins
- Guano Comix #4 (1973) — anthology title
- Heavy Tragi-Comics (1970) — Greg Irons
- Googiewaumer Comics (1969) — Wendel Allen Pugh and F. Sand Jones
- High-Flyin' Funnies Comix & Stories (1970) – Bill Crawford
- Hit the Road (1972) — Pat Ryan and Russ Rosander
- The Human Drama (1978) — anthology title edited by Jim Madow featuring Spain Rodriguez, Mark Fisher, Leslie Cabarga, Alan Weiss, Howard Hopkirk, Roger Brand, Greg Irons, and Madow
- Illuminations (1971) — psychedelic anthology featuring Willie Mendes, Rory Hayes, Julie Wood, Trina Robbins, and others
- Insect Fear (3 issues, 1970–1973) — horror anthology inspired by EC Comics
- Junkwaffel (4 issues, 1971–1972) — Vaughn Bodē; issue #5 (1973) by Last Gasp
- The Kingdom of Heaven is Within You Comics (1969) — John Thompson
- Kukawy Comics (Dec. 1969) — Ϗύκλωψ / Κύκλωψ = GREEK for Ϗýklops — John Thompson
- Lemme Outa Here (Oct. 1978) — stories of life in mid-century American suburbs edited by Diane Noomin, featuring Noomin, Michael McMillan, Robert Armstrong, Bill Griffith, Robert Crumb, Aline Kominsky, Kim Deitch, Justin Green, Mark Beyer, and M. K. Brown
- Lenny of Laredo (Apr. 1966) — reprint of Joel Beck's 1965 work
- Light Comitragies (June 1971) — mostly Greg Irons
- The Man (1972) — reprint of the 1966 University of Syracuse Student Publications first edition by Vaughn Bodē
- Manhunt #1 (July 1973) — feminist comic with contributors like Aline Kominsky, Trina Robbins, Ted Richards, and Bobby London; 2nd issue published by Cartoonists Co-Op Press
- Mean Bitch Thrills (1971) — Spain Rodriguez
- Meef Comix (2 issues, 1973–1974) — Fred Schrier
- Moondog (1970–1973, 1980) — George Metzger; #4 co-published with Last Gasp
- Occult Laff Parade (1973) — anthology title; featured a story by Jay Kinney and Ned Sonntag entitled "Bud Tuttle and Commander Jesus"
- Saloon (1973) — Dave Geiser; published by Geiser's Yahoo Productions and distributed by the Print Mint
- Radical America Komiks (1969) — reprint of volume III, no. 1 of Radical America
- Real Pulp Comics (2 issues, 1971–1973) — anthology; issue #1 featured first Zippy the Pinhead strip (by Bill Griffith)
- Rubber Duck Tales (2 issues, 1971–1972) — Rob Lawso and Michael J.
- San Francisco Comic Book (1970–1973), #2-4 — anthology title at first published with the San Francisco Comic Book Company; later picked up by Last Gasp
- Savage Humor (1973)
- Show + Tell Comics (Oct. 1973) — Justin Green
- Spaced Out (1972) — sci-fi anthology title ft. Ron Roach, Thomas Byrd, Jim Pinkoski, and Ed Verreaux
- Spiffy Stories (1969) — anthology title
- Sphinx (issue #3, 1973) — Susan Morris; continued from Kitchen Sink
- Suds (1969) — Buckwheat Florida Jr.
- Tales from the Ozone (issue #2, 1970) — anthology title, continued from Russ Gibb Productions (1969)
- Tales from the Tube (1972) — Robert Crumb, Rick Griffin, Harold Ward, Robert Williams, and S. Clay Wilson
- Tales of Sex and Death (1971–1975), #1–2 — anthology title
- Tales of Toad (2 issues, 1970–1971) — Bill Griffith; 3rd issue published by Cartoonists Co-Op Press (1973)
- Truckin' (2 issues, 1972–1974) — George Metzger
- Tuff Shit Comics (Mar. 1972) — anthology title
- Uncle Sham (2 issues, 1970–1971) — Dave Geiser; #2 published by Geiser's Yahoo Productions and distributed by the Print Mint
- Uneeda Comics (1970) — Robert Crumb
- Yellow Dog (22 issues, 1968–1973) — anthology started as a tabloid and then converted into a comics magazine (numbered 1–25, with 9–14 being three double issues rather than six single issues)
- Young Lust (issues #2 & #4, 1971 & 1974) — anthology title co-edited by Bill Griffith and Jay Kinney; contributors included Guy Colwell; continued from Company and Sons, later published by Last Gasp
- Zam (Zap Jam) (1974) — Robert Crumb, Rick Griffin, Victor Moscoso, Robert Williams, S. Clay Wilson
- Zap Comix (issues #4–9, 1968–1978) — R. Crumb-edited anthology; continued from Apex Novelties; later picked up by Last Gasp
