= Comics anthology =

Collection of works in the medium of comics

A comics anthology collects works in the medium of comics, typically from multiple series, and compiles them into an anthology or magazine. The comics in these anthologies range from comic strips that are too short for standalone publication to comic book chapters that might later be compiled into collected comic book volumes (such as manga tankobon and comic albums).

== United States ==
Title	Publisher	First year	Last year	Genre	Notes
Detective Comics	DC Comics	1937	ongoing	detective	anthology aspect dropped in the 1960s
Feature Funnies	Everett M. "Busy" Arnold	1937	1939	humor	with issue #21, became Feature Comics
Adventure Comics	DC Comics	1938	1983	various, mostly superhero	
Action Comics	DC Comics	1938	ongoing	adventure, superhero	anthology aspect dropped in 1959
Fantastic Comics	Fox Feature Syndicate	1939	1941	superhero	
Feature Comics	Quality Comics	1939	1950	superhero, humor	evolved from Feature Funnies
Four Color	Dell Comics	1939	1962	various	successive one-shot comics
Whiz Comics	Fawcett Comics	1940	1953	superhero	
Planet Comics	Fiction House	1940	1953	science fiction	
Big Shot Comics	Columbia Comics	1940	1949	superhero, humor	
Young Love	Crestwood Publications; DC Comics	1947; 1960	1956; 1977	romance	acquired by DC Comics in 1963
Young Romance	Crestwood Publications; DC Comics	1947	1977	romance	acquired by DC Comics in 1963
Adventures into the Unknown	ACG	1948	1967	horror	
Sweethearts	Fawcett Comics; Charlton Comics	1948	1973	romance	acquired by Charlton Comics in 1954
Western Comics	DC Comics	1948	1961	Western	
Wild Western	Marvel Comics	1948	1957	Western	
Prize Comics Western	Prize Comics	1948	1956	Western	
Girls' Love Stories	DC Comics	1949	1973	romance	
Romantic Story	Fawcett Comics; Charlton Comics	1949	1973	romance	acquired by Charlton Comics in 1954
Heart Throbs	Quality Comics	1949	1972	romance	acquired by DC Comics in 1957
First Love Illustrated	Harvey Comics	1949	1963	romance	
Marvel Tales	Marvel Comics	1949	1957	horror	
Strange Worlds	Avon Comics	1950	1955	science fiction	
Strange Adventures	DC Comics	1950	1973	science fiction	
Girls' Romances	DC Comics	1950	1971	romance	
Six-Gun Heroes	Fawcett Comics; Charlton Comics	1950	1965	Western	acquired by Charlton Comics in 1954
Tales From the Crypt	EC Comics	1950	1955	horror	
The Vault of Horror	EC Comics	1950	1955	horror	
The Haunt of Fear	EC Comics	1950	1954	horror	
Weird Fantasy	EC Comics	1950	1953	science fiction	
Weird Science	EC Comics	1950	1953	science fiction	
Mystery in Space	DC Comics	1951	1966	science fiction	
House of Mystery	DC Comics	1951	1983	horror/suspense	
All-Star Western	DC Comics	1951	1961	Western	
Frontline Combat	EC Comics	1951	1954	war	
Strange Tales	Marvel Comics	1952	1968	horror, sci-fi, superhero	
Journey into Mystery	Marvel Comics	1952	1966	horror, sci-fi, superhero	anthology aspect dropped in 1964, becomes Thor
G.I. Combat	Quality Comics; DC Comics	1952	1987	war	acquired by DC Comics in 1957
Space Adventures	Charlton Comics	1952	1979	science fiction	
Our Army at War	DC Comics	1952	1977	war	Becomes Sgt. Rock
Star Spangled War Stories	DC Comics	1952	1977	war	Becomes The Unknown Soldier
Our Fighting Forces	DC Comics	1954	1978	war	
Fightin' Marines	Charlton Comics	1955	1984	war	
I Love You	Charlton Comics	1955	1980	romance	
Fightin' Army	Charlton Comics	1956	1984	war	
House of Secrets	DC Comics	1956	1978	horror/suspense	
Showcase	DC Comics	1956	1970	superhero	
Tales of the Unexpected	DC Comics	1956	1968	science fiction	relaunched as the horror anthology The Unexpected
Brides in Love	Charlton Comics	1956	1965	romance	
Outlaws of the West	Charlton Comics	1957	1980	Western	
Teen-Age Love	Charlton Comics	1958	1973	romance	
Just Married	Charlton Comics	1958	1976	romance	
Love Diary	Charlton Comics	1958	1976	romance	
Strange Worlds	Marvel Comics	1958	1959	science fiction	
Tales to Astonish	Marvel Comics	1958	1968	sci-fi, horror, superhero	anthology aspect dropped in 1964, becomes The Incredible Hulk
Tales of Suspense	Marvel Comics	1959	1968	sci-fi, horror, superhero	anthology aspect dropped in 1964, becomes Captain America
Amazing Adventures	Marvel Comics	1961	1961	fantasy, science fiction, superhero	
Amazing Adult Fantasy	Marvel Comics	1961	1962	sci-fi, fantasy	anthology aspect dropped in 1962, becomes The Amazing Spider-Man
Creepy	Warren Publishing	1964	1983	horror	
witzend	Wally Wood; Wonderful Publishing Company	1966	1985	various	acquired by Bill Pearson (Wonderful Publishing Company) in 1968
Ghostly Tales	Charlton Comics	1966	1984	horror	
Eerie	Warren Publishing	1966	1983	horror	
Weird	Eerie Publications	1966	1981	horror	
The Many Ghosts of Doctor Graves	Charlton Comics	1967	1986	horror	
Zap Comix	Apex Novelties	1968	2005	underground	
The Unexpected	DC Comics	1968	1982	horror	changes genre from science fiction to horror (at Tales of the Unexpected); continues same numbering
The Witching Hour	DC Comics	1969	1978	horror	
Terror Tales	Eerie Publications	1969	1979	horror	
Astonishing Tales	Marvel Comics	1970	1976	Superhero	
Slow Death	Last Gasp	1970	1979, 1992	underground	
San Francisco Comic Book	San Francisco Comic Book Company; Print Mint; Last Gasp	1970	1983	underground	
Marvel Feature vol. 1	Marvel Comics	1971	1973	superheroes	
Marvel Spotlight	Marvel Comics	1971	1977	superheroes	
Weird War Tales	DC Comics	1971	1983	war	
Ghostly Haunts	Charlton Comics	1971	1978	horror/suspense	
Savage Tales	Marvel Comics; Dynamite Entertainment	1971; 2007	1986; 2008	fantasy, various	
Weird Western Tales	DC Comics	1972	1980	Weird Western	
Marvel Premiere	Marvel Comics	1972	1981	superheroes	
Tits & Clits Comix	Nanny Goat Productions; Last Gasp	1972	1987	underground	
Snarf	Kitchen Sink Press	1972	1990	underground	
Wimmen's Comix	Last Gasp; Renegade Press; Rip Off Press	1972	1992	underground	
Superman Family	DC Comics	1974	1982	superhero	
Comix Book	Marvel Comics; Kitchen Sink Press	1974	1976	underground	acquired by Kitchen Sink in 1976
Star Reach	Star*Reach	1974	1979	various, mostly action	
Marvel Feature vol. 2	Marvel Comics	1975	1976	superheroes	
Marvel Presents	Marvel Comics	1975	1977	superheroes	
Secrets of Haunted House	DC Comics	1975	1982	horror/suspense	
Batman Family	DC Comics	1975	1978	superhero	
Arcade	Print Mint	1975	1976	underground	
Heavy Metal	HM Communications; Metal Mammoth	1977	2023	adult fantasy	
Time Warp	DC Comics	1979	1980	science fiction	
Marvel Spotlight	Marvel Comics	1979	1981	superheroes	
Epic Illustrated	Epic Comics	1980	1986	heroic fiction	
Gay Comix	Kitchen Sink Press; Bob Ross	1980	1998	underground	
World War 3 Illustrated	World War 3 Illustrated	1980	ongoing	alternative/political	
RAW	Raw Books & Graphics	1980	1991	alternative	
Weirdo	Last Gasp	1981	1993	underground	
Eclipse Magazine	Eclipse Comics	1981	1983	various	
Marvel Fanfare	Marvel Comics	1982	1997	superhero	
Eclipse Monthly	Eclipse Comics	1983	1984	superheroes	
Dark Horse Presents	Dark Horse Comics	1986	2017	independent	volume 3 ended in 2017
Wasteland	DC Comics	1987	1989	horror	
Marvel Comics Presents	Marvel Comics	1988	1995	superhero	
Taboo	Spiderbaby Grafix & Publications; Kitchen Sink Press	1988	1992, 1995	horror	
A1	Atomeka Press	1989	1992	various	
BLAB!	Kitchen Sink Press; Fantagraphics	1989	2007	alternative	acquired by Fantagraphics in 1997
Cheval Noir	Dark Horse Comics	1989	1994	international	
Drawn & Quarterly	Drawn & Quarterly	1990	ongoing	alternative	
Negative Burn	Caliber Comics	1993	1997	independent	
The Big Book Of	Paradox Press	1994	2000	independent	
Verotika	Verotik	1994	1997	erotic/horror	
Zero Zero	Fantagraphics	1995	2000	underground/alternative	
Keyhole	Millennium Publications; Top Shelf Productions	1996	1998	independent/alternative	
Gangland	Vertigo Comics	1999	2001	crime	
Flinch	Vertigo Comics	1998	1998	horror	
Tomorrow Stories	America's Best Comics/Wildstorm	1999	2002	superheroes	
Little Lit	RAW Junior; HarperCollins/Joanna Cotler Books	2000	2003	alternative/children's	Evolved into Toon Books
Kramers Ergot	Avodah Books; Gingko Press; Buenaventura Press	2000	ongoing	alternative	
Solo	DC Comics	2004	2006	superheroes	
Flight	Image Comics; Ballantine Books	2004	2011	independent	acquired by Ballantine in 2006
MOME	Fantagraphics	2005	2011	alternative	
Popgun	Image Comics	2007	2010	diverse	
Wednesday Comics	DC Comics	2009	2009	weekly showcase	
Robert E. Howard's Savage Sword	Dark Horse Comics	2010	2015	various	Based on Robert E. Howard works and characters
A+X	Marvel Comics	2012	2014	superhero	
Island	Image Comics	2015	2017	various	
Amazing Forest	IDW	2016	2016	various	
Vast Expanse	Township Comics	2016	ongoing	various	

== Asia ==
=== Malaysia ===
Title	Publisher	First year	Last year	Genre	Notes
Garaj Komik	Self-publishing	2015	ongoing	various	successive one-shot comics

=== Thailand ===
Title	Publisher	First year	Last year	Genre	Notes
Thai Comics	Vibulkij publishing	1992	2013	various	anthology for amateur & veteran

== Europe ==
=== Belgium and France ===
Title	Publisher	First year	Last year	Notes
Le Petit Vingtième	Le Vingtième Siècle	1928	1940	
Spirou magazine	Dupuis	1938	ongoing	
Tintin magazine	Le Lombard; Média-Participations	1946	1993	Le Lombard acquired by Média-Participations in 1986.
Pilote magazine	Dargaud	1959	1989	
Pif gadget	French Communist Party	1969; 2004	1994; 2009	
Charlie Hebdo	Gérard Biard	1970; 1992	1981 ongoing	
L'Écho des savanes	Self-published; Albin Michel	1972	2006	Acquired by Albin Michel in 1986
Métal Hurlant	Les Humanoïdes Associés; Humanoids Publishing/DC Comics	1974; 2002	1987 ongoing	
Fluide Glacial	Groupe Flammarion	1975	ongoing	
À Suivre magazine	Casterman	1979	1997	
Lapin	L'Association	1999	ongoing	

=== United Kingdom ===
Britain has a long tradition of publishing comic anthologies, usually weekly (hence The Dandy going past 3,000 published issues).

Title	Publisher	First year	Last year	Notes
Comic Cuts	Amalgamated Press	1890	1953	merged with Golden Penny, Jolly Comic and Larks before finally merging with Knockout
The Dandy		1937	2012	
The Beano		1938	ongoing	
Eagle	Hulton Press; IPC Magazines	1950; 1982	1969; 1994	relaunched by different publisher
Lion		1952	1974	
Bunty		1958	2000	
Buster		1960	2000	
Valiant		1962	1976	
Wham!		1964	1968	
Smash!		1966	1971	
Pow!		1967	1968	
Fantastic		1967	1968	
Terrific		1967	1968	
Action	IPC Magazines	1976	1977	
2000 AD	IPC Magazines; Fleetway; Rebellion Developments	1977	ongoing	merged with Starlord and Tornado
Starlord	IPC Magazines	1978	1978	Merged with 2000AD
Tornado	IPC Magazines	1978	1979	Merged with 2000AD
Warrior	Quality	1982	1985	
Scream!	IPC Magazines	1984	1984	merged with re-launched Eagle
Oink!	IPC Magazines	1986	1988	
Crisis	Fleetway	1988	1991	
Wildcat	Fleetway	1988	1989	stories continued in re-launched Eagle
Deadline		1988	1995	
A1	Atomeka/Epic Comics	1989	1992, 2004	irregular publishing schedule over multiple publishers
Judge Dredd Megazine	Fleetway Publications; Rebellion Developments	1990	ongoing	
Revolver	Fleetway Publications	1990	1991	Dare storyline completed in Crisis following cancellation
Toxic!	Apocalypse Ltd	1991	1991	not related to Toxic
Toxic (magazine)	Egmont Publishing	2002	ongoing	not related to Toxic!
The DFC		2008	2009	
The Phoenix		2012	ongoing	

== See also ==
- British comics, the majority of which are anthologies
- British small press comics, many of which are also anthologies
- History of comics
- List of manga magazines, the majority of which are anthologies
