= Underground comix =

Comics genre

- The cover artwork for the first issue of Zap Comix, featuring the character Mr. Natural.
- Authors: R. Crumb; Kim Deitch; Trina Robbins; Spain Rodriguez; Gilbert Shelton
- Publishers: Apex Novelties; Kitchen Sink Press; Last Gasp; Print Mint; Rip Off Press
- Publications: Zap Comix; Arcade; Bijou Funnies; Fabulous Furry Freak Brothers; Wimmen's Comix

Related genres
- Alternative comics

Underground comix are small press or self-published comic books that are often socially relevant or satirical in nature. They differ from mainstream comics in depicting content forbidden to mainstream publications by the Comics Code Authority, including explicit drug use, sexuality, and violence. They were most popular in the United States and in the United Kingdom in the 1960s and 1970s.

Robert Crumb, Gilbert Shelton, Barbara "Willy" Mendes, Trina Robbins and numerous other cartoonists created underground titles that were popular with readers within the counterculture scene. Punk had its own comic artists like Gary Panter. Long after their heyday, underground comix gained prominence with films and television shows influenced by the movement and with mainstream comic books, but their legacy is most obvious with alternative comics.

== History ==
=== United States ===
The United States underground comics scene emerged in the 1960s, focusing on subjects dear to the counterculture: recreational drug use, politics, rock music, and free love. The underground comix scene had its strongest success in the United States between 1968 and 1975, with titles initially distributed primarily through head shops. Underground comix often featured covers intended to appeal to the drug culture, and imitated LSD-inspired posters to increase sales.

These titles were termed "comix" in order to differentiate them from mainstream publications. The "X" also emphasized the X-rated contents of the publications. Many of the common aspects of the underground comix scene were in response to the strong restrictions forced upon mainstream publications by the Comics Code Authority, which refused publications featuring depictions of violence, sexuality, drug use, and socially relevant content, all of which appeared in greater levels in underground comix. Robert Crumb stated that the appeal of underground comix was their lack of censorship: "People forget that that was what it was all about. That was why we did it. We didn't have anybody standing over us saying 'No, you can't draw this' or 'You can't show that'. We could do whatever we wanted".

==== Antecedents ====
Between the late 1920s and late 1940s, anonymous underground artists produced counterfeit pornographic comic books featuring unauthorized depictions of popular comic strip characters engaging in sexual activities. Often referred to as Tijuana bibles, these books are often considered the predecessors of the underground comix scene.

American comix were strongly influenced by 1950s EC Comics and especially magazines edited by Harvey Kurtzman, including Mad (which first appeared in 1952). Kurtzman's Help! magazine, published from 1960 to 1965, featured the works of artists who would later become well known in the underground comix scene, including R. Crumb and Gilbert Shelton. Other artists published work in college magazines before becoming known in the underground scene.

==== 1962–1968: Early history ====
Early underground comix appeared sporadically in the early- and mid-1960s, but did not begin to appear frequently until after 1967. The first underground comix were personal works produced for friends of the artists. Perhaps the earliest of the underground comic strips was Frank Stack's (under the pseudonym Foolbert Sturgeon) The Adventures of Jesus, begun in 1962 and compiled in photocopied zine form by Gilbert Shelton in 1964. It has been credited as the first underground comic. Shelton's own Wonder Wart-Hog appeared in the college humor magazine Bacchanal #1-2 in 1962. Jack Jackson's God Nose, published in Texas in 1964, has also been given that title. One guide lists two other underground comix from that year, Vaughn Bodē's Das Kampf and Charles Plymell's Robert Ronnie Branaman.

Joel Beck began contributing a full-page comic each week to the underground newspaper the Berkeley Barb and his full-length comic Lenny of Laredo was published in 1965. Another underground paper, the East Village Other, was an important precursor to the underground comix movement, featuring comic strips by artists including Crumb, Shelton, Kim Deitch, Trina Robbins, Spain Rodriguez, and Art Spiegelman before true underground comix emerged from San Francisco with the first issue of Zap Comix. Zap and many of the first true underground comix publications began with reprints of comic strip pages which first appeared in underground papers like the East Village Other, the Berkeley Barb, and Yarrowstalks. (Note: Reprints were popular with publishers because underground artists originally had few claims on their own work. The basis for this was that material originally printed in publications that belonged to the Underground Press Syndicate (such as the Berkeley Barb and the East Village Other) was available to reprint for free by other UPS members. This permission was exploited by some underground comix publishers, bulking up or entirely filling their own magazines with work whose creators didn't receive any payment even when those publishers made a profit.)

==== 1968–1972: Underground's "Golden Age" ====
In February 1968, in San Francisco, Robert Crumb published (with the help of poet Charles Plymell and Don Donahue of Apex Novelties) his first solo comic, Zap Comix. The title was financially successful and almost single-handedly developed a market for underground comix.

Within a few issues, Zap began to feature other cartoonists — including S. Clay Wilson, Robert Williams, Spain Rodriguez, and Gilbert Shelton — and Crumb launched a series of solo titles, including Despair, Uneeda (both published by Print Mint in 1969), Big Ass Comics, R. Crumb's Comics and Stories, Motor City Comics (all published by Rip Off Press in 1969), Home Grown Funnies (Kitchen Sink Press, 1971) and Hytone Comix (Apex Novelties, 1971), in addition to founding the pornographic anthologies Jiz and Snatch (both Apex Novelties, 1969).

The San Francisco Bay Area was an epicenter of the underground comix movement; Crumb and many other underground cartoonists lived in San Francisco's Haight-Ashbury neighborhood in the mid-to-late 1960s. Just as importantly, the major underground publishers were all based in the area: Don Donahue's Apex Novelties, Gary Arlington's San Francisco Comic Book Company, and Rip Off Press were all headquartered in the city, with Ron Turner's Last Gasp and the Print Mint based in Berkeley. Last Gasp later moved to San Francisco.

By the end of the 1960s, there was recognition of the movement by a major American museum when the Corcoran Gallery of Art staged an exhibition, The Phonus Balonus Show (May 20-June 15, 1969). Curated by Bhob Stewart for famed museum director Walter Hopps, it included work by Crumb, Shelton, Vaughn Bodē, Kim Deitch, Jay Lynch and others.

Crumb's best known underground features included Whiteman, Angelfood McSpade, Fritz the Cat, and Mr. Natural. Crumb also drew himself as a character, caricaturing himself as a self-loathing, sex-obsessed intellectual. While Crumb's work was often praised for its social commentary, he was also criticized for the misogyny that appeared within his comics. Trina Robbins said: "It's weird to me how willing people are to overlook the hideous darkness in Crumb's work... What the hell is funny about rape and murder?" Because of his popularity, many underground cartoonists tried to imitate Crumb's work. While Zap was the best-known anthology of the scene, other anthologies appeared, including Bijou Funnies, a Chicago publication edited by Jay Lynch and heavily influenced by Mad. The San Francisco anthology Young Lust (Company & Sons, 1970), which parodied the 1950s romance genre, featured works by Bill Griffith and Art Spiegelman. Another anthology, Bizarre Sex (Kitchen Sink, 1972), was influenced by science fiction comics and included art by Denis Kitchen and Richard "Grass" Green, one of the few African-American comix creators.

Other important underground cartoonists of the era included Shelton, Wilson, Deitch, Rodriguez, Skip Williamson, Rick Griffin, George Metzger, and Victor Moscoso. Shelton became famous for his characters Wonder Wart-Hog, a superhero parody, and The Fabulous Furry Freak Brothers, a strip about a trio of "freaks" whose time is spent attempting to acquire drugs and avoid the police, both of which first appeared in the self-published Feds 'N' Heads in 1968. Wilson's work is permeated by shocking violence and ugly sex; he contributed to Zap and created the infamous The Checkered Demon, a portly, shirtless being who is frequently called upon to kill the various demented bikers, pirates, and rapists who populate Wilson's universe. Spain worked for the East Village Other before becoming known within underground comix for Trashman and his solo titles Zodiac Mindwarp and Subvert. Williamson created his character Snappy Sammy Smoot, appearing in several titles.

Underground horror comics also became popular, with titles such as Skull (Rip Off Press, 1970), Bogeyman (San Francisco Comic Book Company, 1969), Fantagor (Richard Corben, 1970), Insect Fear (Print Mint, 1970), Up From the Deep (Rip Off Press, 1971), Death Rattle (Kitchen Sink, 1972), Gory Stories (Shroud, 1972), Deviant Slice (Print Mint, 1972) and Two Fisted Zombies (Last Gasp, 1973). Many of these were strongly influenced by 1950s EC Comics like Tales from the Crypt.

The male-dominated scene produced many blatantly misogynistic works, but female underground cartoonists made strong marks as well. Edited by Trina Robbins, It Ain't Me, Babe, published by Last Gasp in 1970, was the first all-female underground comic; followed in 1972 by Wimmen's Comix (Last Gasp), an anthology series founded by cartoonist Patricia Moodian that featured (among others) Melinda Gebbie, Lynda Barry, Aline Kominsky, and Shary Flenniken. Joyce Farmer and Lyn Chevli's Tits & Clits Comix all-female anthology debuted in 1972 as well.

==== 1972–1975: Controversy and recognition ====
By 1972–1973, the city's Mission District was "underground headquarters": living and operating out of The Mission in that period were Gary Arlington, Roger Brand, Kim Deitch, Don Donahue, Shary Flenniken, Justin Green, Bill Griffith & Diane Noomin, Rory Hayes, Jay Kinney, Bobby London, Ted Richards, Trina Robbins, Joe Schenkman, Larry Todd, Patricia Moodian and Art Spiegelman.

Mainstream publications such as Playboy and National Lampoon began to publish comics and art similar to that of underground comix. The underground movement also prompted older professional comic book artists to try their hand in the alternate press. Wally Wood published witzend in 1966, soon passing the title on to artist-editor Bill Pearson. In 1969, Wood created Heroes, Inc. Presents Cannon, intended for distribution to armed forces bases. Steve Ditko gave full vent to his Ayn Rand-inspired philosophy in Mr. A and Avenging World (1973). In 1975, Flo Steinberg, Stan Lee's former secretary at Marvel Comics, published Big Apple Comix, featuring underground work by ostensibly "mainstream" artists she knew from Marvel.

Film and television began to reflect the influence of underground comix in the 1970s, starting with the release of Ralph Bakshi's Crumb adaptation, Fritz the Cat, the first animated film to receive an X rating from the MPAA. Further adult-oriented animated films based on or influenced by underground comix followed, including The Nine Lives of Fritz the Cat and Down and Dirty Duck. The influence of underground comix has also been attributed to films such as The Lord of the Rings (1978) and Forbidden Zone (1980). The animation sequences – created by Help! contributor Terry Gilliam – and surrealistic humor of Monty Python's Flying Circus have also been partly attributed to the influence of the underground comix scene.

Despite the form's influence on the culture at large, however, by 1972, only four major underground publishers remained in operation: the Print Mint, Rip Off Press, Last Gasp, and Krupp Comic Works (Kitchen Sink Press). For much of the 1970s, Rip Off Press operated a syndication service, managed by cartoonist and co-owner Gilbert Shelton, that sold weekly comix content to alternative newspapers and student publications. Each Friday, the company sent out a distribution sheet with the strips it was selling, by such cartoonists as Shelton, Joel Beck, Dave Sheridan, Ted Richards, Bill Griffith, and Harry Driggs (as R. Diggs). The syndicate petered out by 1979; much of the material produced for it was eventually published in the company's long-running anthology Rip Off Comix, which had debuted in 1977. Griffith's strip, Zippy, which had debuted in 1976 as a weekly strip with the syndicate, was eventually picked up for daily syndication by King Features Syndicate in 1986.

Critics of the underground comix scene claimed that the publications were socially irresponsible, and glorified violence, sex and drug use. In 1973, the U.S. Supreme Court, in Miller v. California, ruled that local communities could decide their own First Amendment standards with reference to obscenity. In the mid-1970s, sale of drug paraphernalia was outlawed in many places, and the distribution network for these comics (and the underground newspapers) dried up, leaving mail order as the only commercial outlet for underground titles.

In 1974, Marvel launched Comix Book, requesting that underground artists submit significantly less explicit work appropriate for newsstands sales. A number of underground artists agreed to contribute work, including Spiegelman, Robbins and S. Clay Wilson, but Comix Book did not sell well and lasted only five issues. In 1976, Marvel achieved success with Howard the Duck, a satirical comic aimed at adult audiences that was inspired by the underground comix scene. While it did not depict the explicit content that was often featured in underground comix, it was more socially relevant than anything Marvel had previously published.

By the mid-1970s, independent publishers began to release book-length collections of underground comics. Quick Fox/Links Books released two important collections, The Apex Treasury of Underground Comics, published in 1974, and The Best of Bijou Funnies, released in 1975. The Apex Treasury featured work by Crumb, Deitch, Griffith, Spain, Shelton, Spiegelman, Lynch, Shary Flenniken, Justin Green, Bobby London, and Willy Murphy; while the Bijou Funnies book highlighted comics by Lynch, Green, Crumb, Shelton, Spiegelman, Deitch, Skip Williamson, Jay Kinney, Evert Geradts, Rory Hayes, Dan Clyne, and Jim Osborne. Similarly, and around this time, the publishing cooperative And/Or Press published The Young Lust Reader (1974), a "best-of" collection from Griffith and Kinney's Young Lust anthology, and Dave Sheridan and Fred Schrier's The Overland Vegetable Stagecoach presents Mindwarp: An Anthology (1975). And/Or Press later published the first paperback collections of Griffith's Zippy the Pinhead comics.

==== 1975–1982: The underground era comes to a close ====
By this time, some artists, including Art Spiegelman, felt that the underground comix scene had become less creative than it had been in the past. According to Spiegelman: "What had seemed like a revolution simply deflated into a lifestyle. Underground comics were stereotyped as dealing only with Sex, Dope and Cheap Thrills. They got stuffed back into the closet, along with bong pipes and love beads, as Things Started To Get Uglier".

One of the last major underground titles was Arcade: The Comics Revue, co-edited by Spiegelman and Bill Griffith. With the underground movement encountering a slowdown, Spiegelman and Griffith conceived of Arcade as a "safe berth", featuring contributions from such major underground figures as Robert Armstrong, Robert Crumb, Justin Green, Aline Kominsky, Jay Lynch, Spain Rodriguez, Gilbert Shelton, and S. Clay Wilson (as well as Griffith and Spiegelman). Arcade stood out from similar publications by having an editorial plan, in which Spiegelman and Griffith attempted to show how comics connected to the broader realms of artistic and literary culture. Arcade lasted seven issues, from 1975 to 1976.

Autobiographical comics began to come into prominence in 1976, with the premiere of Harvey Pekar's self-published comic American Splendor, which featured art by several cartoonists associated with the underground, including Crumb. Comics critic Jared Gardner asserts that, while underground comix was associated with countercultural iconoclasm, the movement's most enduring legacy was to be autobiography.

In the late 1970s, Marvel and DC Comics agreed to sell their comics on a no-return basis with large discounts to comic book retailers; this led to later deals that helped underground publishers. During this period, underground titles focusing on feminist and Gay Liberation themes began to appear, as well as comics associated with the environmental movement. Anarchy Comics focused on left-wing politics, while Barney Steel's Armageddon focused on anarcho-capitalism. British underground cartoonists also created political titles, but they did not sell as well as American political comics.

Artists influenced by the underground comix scene, who were unable to get work published by better-known underground publications, began self-publishing their own small press, photocopied comic books, known as minicomics. The punk subculture began to influence underground comix.

==== 1982–present ====
In 1982, the distribution of underground comix changed through the emergence of specialty stores.

In response to attempts by mainstream publishers to appeal to adult audiences, alternative comics emerged, focusing on many of the same themes as underground comix, as well as publishing experimental work. Artists formally in the underground comix scene began to associate themselves with alternative comics, including Crumb, Deitch, Griffith, Lynda Barry, and Justin Green.

In the 1980s, sexual comics came into prominence, integrating sex into storylines rather than utilizing sexual explicitness for shock value. The first of these features was Omaha the Cat Dancer, which made its first appearance in an issue of the zine Vootie. Inspired by Fritz the Cat, Omaha the Cat Dancer focused on an anthropomorphic feline stripper. Other comix with a sexual focus included Melody (), based on the life story of Sylvie Rancourt and Cherry, a comedic sex comic featuring art similar in style to that of Archie Comics.

In 1985, Griffith's comic strip Zippy the Pinhead — which originally appeared in underground titles — was syndicated as a daily feature by King Features. Between 1980 and 1991 Spiegelman's graphic novel Maus was serialized in Raw, and published in two volumes in 1986 and 1991. It was followed by an exhibition at the Museum of Modern Art and a Pulitzer Prize for Spiegelman in 1992. The novel originated from a three-page story first published in an underground comic, Funny Aminals [sic], (Apex Novelties, 1972).

Alternative cartoonist Peter Bagge was strongly influenced by underground comics, and was reciprocally admired by Crumb, for whom Bagge edited Weirdo magazine in the 1980s; he could be considered part of a "second generation" of underground-type cartoonists, including such notables as Mike Diana, Johnny Ryan, Bob Fingerman, David Heatley, Danny Hellman, Julie Doucet, Jim Woodring, Ivan Brunetti, Gary Leib, Doug Allen, and Ed Piskor. Many of these artists were published by Fantagraphics Books, which was founded in 1977 and through the 1980s and '90s became a major publisher of alternative and underground cartoonists' work.

As of the 2010s, reprints of early underground comix continue to sell alongside modern underground publications.

The 2010s Foreskin Man, a comic book published to protest against circumcision, has been referred to as "comix" by some reviewers.

=== United Kingdom ===
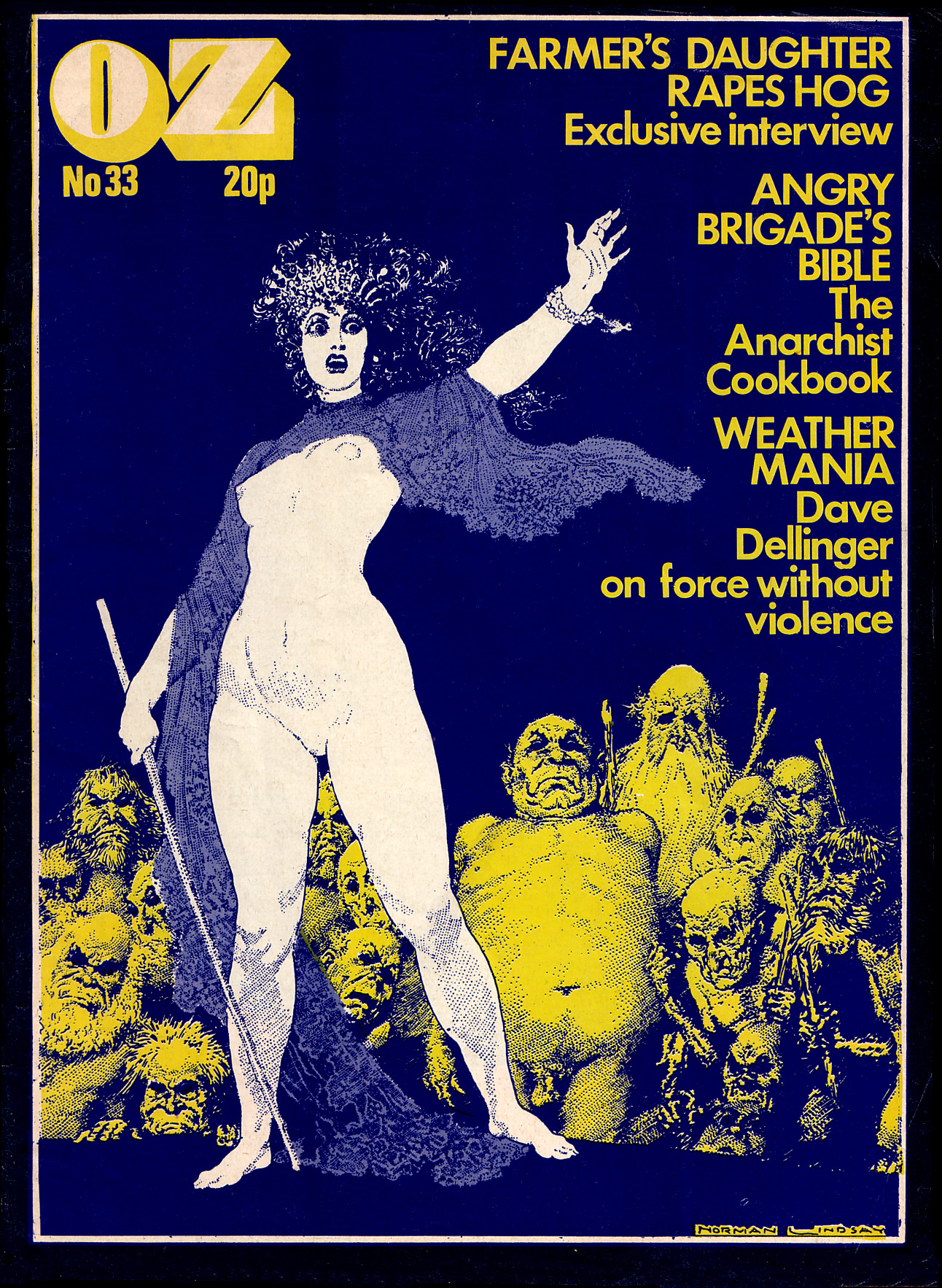
OZ London, No.33, February 1971; art by Norman Lindsay

British cartoonists were introduced in the underground publications International Times (IT), founded in 1966, and Oz founded in 1967, which reprinted some American material. During a visit to London, American comics artist Larry Hama created original material for IT.

The first UK comix mag was Cyclops, started in July 1970 by IT staff members. In a bid to alleviate its ongoing financial problems, IT brought out Nasty Tales (1971), which was soon prosecuted for obscenity. Despite appearing before the censorious Old Bailey Judge Alan King-Hamilton, the publishers were acquitted by the jury.

In the wake of its own high-profile obscenity trial, Oz launched cOZmic Comics in 1972, printing a mixture of new British underground strips and old American work. When Oz closed down the following year cOZmic Comics was continued by fledgling media tycoon Felix Dennis and his company, Cozmic Comics/H. Bunch Associates, which published from 1972 to 1975.

While the American underground comix scene was beginning to decline, the British scene came into prominence between 1973 and 1974, but soon faced the same kind of criticism that American underground comix received. UK-based underground cartoonists included Chris Welch, Edward Barker, Michael J. Weller, Malcolm Livingstone, William Rankin (aka Wyndham Raine), Dave Gibbons, Joe Petagno, Bryan Talbot, and the team of Martin Sudden, Jay Jeff Jones and Brian Bolland.

The last UK underground comix series of note was Brainstorm Comix (1975–1978), which featured only original British strips (mostly by Bryan Talbot).

Hassle Free Press was founded in London in 1975 by Tony and Carol Bennett as a publisher and distributor of underground books and comics. Now known as Knockabout Comics, the company has a long-standing relationship with underground comix pioneers Gilbert Shelton and Robert Crumb, as well as British creators like Hunt Emerson and Bryan Talbot. Knockabout has frequently suffered from prosecutions from UK customs, who have seized work by creators such as Crumb and Melinda Gebbie, claiming it to be obscene.

The 1990s witnessed a renaissance in the genre in the United Kingdom, through titles like Brain Damage, Viz, and others.

== Archives ==
After the death of King Features Syndicate editor Jay Kennedy, his personal underground comix collection was acquired by the Billy Ireland Cartoon Library & Museum in Ohio.

The University of California, Berkeley's Bancroft Library has a large underground comix collection, especially related to Bay Area publications; much of it was built by a deposit account at Gary Arlington's San Francisco Comic Book Store. The collection also includes titles from New York, Los Angeles, and elsewhere.

The Rhode Island School of Design's Fleet Library acquired a thousand-item collection of underground comix through a donation by Bill Adler in 2021.

== See also ==
- Keep On Truckin'
- Doujinshi, self-published manga
- Silver Age of Comic Books
- Bronze Age of Comic Books

== Bibliography ==
- Estren, Mark James. A History of Underground Comics (Straight Arrow Books/Simon and Schuster, 1974; revised ed., Ronin publishing, 1992)
- Kennedy, Jay. The Underground and New Wave Comix Price Guide. Cambridge, Massachusetts: Boatner Norton Press, 1982.
- Rosenkranz, Patrick. Rebel Visions: the Underground Comix Revolution, 1963–1975 Fantagraphics Books, 2002. ISBN 1-56097-464-8
