= Spain Rodriguez =

American cartoonist (1940–2012)

- Born: Manuel Rodriguez; March 2, 1940 Buffalo, New York, U.S.
- Died: November 28, 2012 (aged 72) San Francisco, California, U.S.
- Areas: Cartoonist, Artist
- Pseudonym: Algernon Backwash
- Notable works: Trashman
- Awards: 2013 Will Eisner Hall of Fame Award
- Spouse: Susan Stern

United Cartoon Workers of America
- United Cartoon Workers of America shirt design by cartoonist Yossarian (née Alan Shenker)
- Simon Deitch wearing United Cartoon Workers of America T-shirt at the Berkeley Comix Convention, 1972

Manuel Rodriguez (March 2, 1940 – November 28, 2012), better known as Spain or Spain Rodriguez, was an American underground cartoonist who created the character Trashman.

== Early life ==
"I would go back to Buffalo periodically and I would take photos. It's interesting. Hardly any of those buildings are there now. My old neighborhood is a freeway interchange. Whenever I run into people from that time period they all remember those days. I thought it was me. I thought it was some personal quirk remembering Buffalo in those days but in Buffalo itself there's a whole cult around that." - Manuel Spain Rodriguez

Manuel Rodriguez was born March 2, 1940, in Buffalo, New York. He picked up the nickname Spain as a child, when he heard some kids in the neighborhood bragging about their Irish ancestry, and he defiantly claimed Spain was just as good as Ireland. Rodriguez studied at the Silvermine Guild Art School in New Canaan, Connecticut alongside cartoonist M.K. Brown.

"When Manuel Spain Rodriguez ditched art school in 1959, the decision came easily. The Silvermine Guild School of Art professors didn't appreciate his representational drawings, an alcoholic landlord threatened his life, and he'd witnessed a good friend commit suicide. So he returned to his hometown of Buffalo, New York, where he painted, took a janitor job (at the Western Electric plant for five years), became invested in left wing politics, and joined an outlaw motorcycle gang. Rodriguez's experiences as a member of the Road Vultures Motorcycle Club later manifested in black-and-white illustrations when he moved to Manhattan."

== Career ==
Zodiac Mindwarp cover art by Rodriguez

In New York City, during the late 1960s, he became a contributor to the underground newspaper the East Village Other, which published his own comics tabloid, Zodiac Mindwarp (1968). Trashman's first appearance was as a full-page serial in the East Village Other. He covered the 1968 Democratic National Convention in Chicago as a reporter for the East Village Other, adventures which were chronicled in My True Story (Fantagraphics Books, 1994). One of his earliest strips, "Manning," featured a hard-boiled, over-the-top cop and was later cited as an influence on the British comics character Judge Dredd.

"When I met him, he struck me as an archetypal character. Somewhere between a crazy artist crossed with a left wing radical, crossed with a working class Latino hood" - Robert Crumb

Rodriguez was a co-founder (with Nancy Griffith, Bill Griffith, Robert Crumb, Justin Green, Art Spiegelman, Roger Brand, and Michele Brand) of the United Cartoon Workers of America, The U.C.W. of A. brand appeared on a number of comix of that era.

"In November 1970, Simon Deitch, Rory Hayes, and Spain Rodriguez organized a meeting at Rodriguez's home to debate the foundation of a movement that could, if need be, attach itself to the IWW. From this first meeting came the name of the association, "United Cartoon Workers of America" (UCWA), but no other concrete decisions were made. The following month, over the course of a second meeting that assembled a greater number of participants with assistance from Rip Off Press, the creators placed their own status in underground publishing on the table. As independent creators, they circulated in a restricted network of small publishing houses, none of which realized any particularly elevated profits at the expense of the creators. In the eyes of some, like Roger Brand, this working situation did not justify the existence of a union. The third meeting was more didactic: Albert Morse, the lawyer for Zap Comix (and for Robert Crumb), wrote a report on the topic of royalties, Greg Irons explained how to buy art supplies in bulk, and Bill Griffith dissected the costs of printing and distribution. The creators present at this meeting agreed on a general page rate of twenty-five to thirty dollars a page, and on the royalties of about one thousand dollars for twenty thousand copies of a thirty-six-page comic book sold for fifty cents. Subsequent meetings took place but no union saw the light of day."

Rodriguez contributed to numerous underground comics in the 1960s–2000s, including San Francisco Comic Book, Young Lust, Arcade, Bijou Funnies, Weirdo, and Harvey Pekar's American Splendor. Rodriguez joined the Zap Comix collective in issue #4 (August 1969), and contributed stories to every issue from then until the comic's end in 2005. In Rodriguez's Mean Bitch Thrills (Print Mint, 1971), women are depicted as raunchy and explicitly sexual, occasionally expressing macho sadomasochistic themes.

"Spain Rodriguez's work stands above that of all the other male artists in this creation of sexually explicit comics art, both because he was so prolific and popular, and because he strove to show his sympathy toward women's passions and struggles. Admittedly, he did so in ways that were distinctively his own."

"The tall, leggy, often half-naked "Big Bitch" is a raunchy, explicitly sexual Rodriguez character who appears in She Comics in stories that often incorporate macho, sadomasochistic themes."

After moving from New York City to San Francisco in 1970, Rodriguez's Subvert Comics series (1970–1976) featured "three full length Trashman: Agent of the Sixth International stories." Trashman later appeared in such publications as High Times, Heavy Metal, Weirdo, San Francisco magazine, Zap #11–13, and the Fantagraphics anthology Zero Zero #2.

From 1976 to 1998, Rodriguez contributed cover art to more than a dozen issues of the popular pornographic magazine Screw.

From 1998 to 1999, Rodriguez drew the continuing graphic story, The Dark Hotel, which ran on the website Salon

Rodriguez drew Sherlock Holmes' Strangest Cases based on Arthur Conan Doyle's stories: "The Adventure of the Engineer's Thumb," "The Adventure of the Musgrave Ritual," "The Adventure of the Devil's Foot," "The Adventure of the Speckled Band," and "The Adventure of Black Peter."

Rodriguez's later work included an illustrated biography of Marxist revolutionary Ernesto "Che" Guevara, Che: A Graphic Biography (Verso Books, 2008). Published in several different languages, it was described by cartoonist Art Spiegelman as "brilliant and radical." His history of the California farm worker movement, Farmworker Comix was published posthumously in 2014 by the California Federation of Teachers.

Rodriguez designed at least five posters for the San Francisco Mime Troupe, a political satirist theatre company.

Rodriguez taught art classes at Mission Cultural Center for Latino Arts for many years, and he supported the creation of murals in the Mission District. Spain did color xerox postcards and prints in the late '70s/early '80s at Galería de la Raza.

== Personal life ==
Rodriguez married a daughter of Adele and Robert Stern, Susan Stern, a poet, an Oakland Tribune and KPIX investigative journalist in Boston and the San Francisco Bay Area, and the director of the films Barbie Nation: An Unauthorized Tour, The Self-Made Man and Bad Attitude: The Art of Spain Rodriguez. They have a daughter, a New York-based artist. Susan's documentary films are about her daughter's dolls, her father, and her husband.

Rodriguez died at his home in San Francisco on November 28, 2012, after battling cancer for six years.

== Influences and Legacy ==
His experiences on the road with the motorcycle club, the Road Vultures M.C., provided inspiration for his work, as did his left-wing politics. Strongly influenced by 1950s EC Comics illustrator Wally Wood, Rodriguez pushed Wood's sharp, crisp black shadows and hard-edged black outlines into a more simplified, stylized direction. His work also extended the eroticism of Wood's female characters. Robert Crumb and Rodriguez share influences.

In 2012, an anonymous seven-panel graffiti tribute mural was spray-painted on a former warehouse and shipping platform of the Railway Express Agency owned by the City of Buffalo, near Buffalo Central Terminal and a package containing a CD of images and a note: "Included are photos of an illegal mural – a dedication to Spain Rodriguez, located in Buffalo's East-Side, at the Central Terminal, please use these photos and your powers to get the mural some shine … or just throw the CD out.", photos of which circulated on Facebook.

In 2013, Ian De Beer directed a team of street artists to spray-paint a graffiti tribute mural in the style of Spain Rodriguez on a parking lot wall of a convenience store at Allen and College streets, in the Allentown, Buffalo neighborhood, inspired by a Spain Rodriguez comic about a fight he got into at a bar, across the street from the mural.

In 2021, Bad Attitude: The Art of Spain Rodriguez a documentary, was directed by his wife, filmmaker Susan Stern.

== Awards ==
In July 2013, during San Diego Comic-Con, Rodriguez was one of six inductees into the Will Eisner Hall of Fame. The award was presented posthumously by Mad magazine cartoonist and Groo the Wanderer creator Sergio Aragonés. The other inductees were Lee Falk, Al Jaffee, Mort Meskin, Joe Sinnott, and Trina Robbins.

== Exhibitions ==
- 1988 (June 27 – August 10) Galería Esquina de la Libertad (San Francisco) — "Spain : a View from the Bottom: Posters, Comic Strips, Caricatures and More"
- 2012 (September 14, 2012 – January 13, 2013) Burchfield Penney Art Center at Buffalo State College (Buffalo, NY) — "Spain: Rock, Roll, Rumbles, Rebels & Revolution"

== Bibliography ==
- Subvert Comics #1–2 (Rip Off Press, 1970–1972); #3 (Saving Grace, 1976)
- Mean Bitch Thrills (Print Mint, Sept. 1971)
- Food Price Blackmail: Who's Behind the High Cost of Eating, text by Margaret Lobenstein & John Schommer. United Front Press, 1973.
- Trashman Lives!: The Collected Stories from 1968 to 1985 (Fantagraphics, 1989).
- She: Anthology of Big Bitch (with Susie Bright). San Francisco: Last Gasp, 1993.
- My True Story. Seattle: Fantagraphics Books, 1994.
- Nothing in This Book Is True, But It's Exactly How Things Are, text by Bob Frissell. Berkeley: Frog Ltd., 1994.
- Alien Apocalypse 2006 (with Kathy Glass and Harold S. Robbins). Berkeley: Frog Ltd., 2000.
- Sherlock Holmes' Strangest Cases by Sir Arthur Conan Doyle. San Francisco: Word Play Publications, 2001.
- Nightmare Alley by William Lindsay Gresham. Seattle: Fantagraphics Books, 2003. ISBN 1-56097-511-3
- You Are a Spiritual Being Having a Human Experience, text by Bob Frissell. Berkeley: Frog Ltd., 2003.
- Che: A Graphic Biography, edited by Paul Buhle. London/New York: Verso, 2008.
- Devil Dog: the Amazing True Story of the Man Who Saved America, text by David Talbot. Simon & Schuster, 2010.
- Cruisin' with the Hound (Fantagraphics Books, 2012).
- Farmworker Comix: a History of the Farm Labor Struggle in California, text by Bill Morgan. (California Federation of Teachers, 2014).
- Dies Irae: One Man Against the American Empire (A Graphic Story of 9/11), text by Wolcott Wheeler. Independently Published, 2003,2018.
