= Young Lust (comics) =

Underground comix anthology

- The cover of Young Lust #1 (Oct. 1970), art by Bill Griffith and Jay Kinney.

Publication information
- Publisher: Company & Sons (1970); Print Mint (1971; 1973); Last Gasp (1972; 1977–1993)
- Schedule: Varied
- Format: Ongoing series
- Publication date: October 1970 – 1993
- No. of issues: 8

Creative team
- Created by: Bill Griffith and Jay Kinney
- Artist(s): Bill Griffith, Jay Kinney, Justin Green, Art Spiegelman, Roger Brand, Spain Rodriguez, Diane Noomin, Kim Deitch, Paul Mavrides, Phoebe Gloeckner, Harry S. Robins, Carol Lay, Jennifer Camper, Daniel Clowes, Charles Burns, Terry LaBan, Lloyd Dangle
- Editor(s): Bill Griffith and Jay Kinney

Young Lust is an underground comix anthology that was published sporadically from 1970 to 1993. The title, which parodied 1950s romance comics such as Young Love, was noted for its explicit depictions of sex. Unlike many other sex-fueled underground comix, Young Lust was generally not perceived as misogynistic. Founding editors Bill Griffith and Jay Kinney gradually morphed the title into a satire of societal mores. According to Kinney, Young Lust "became one of the top three best-selling underground comix, along with Zap Comix and The Fabulous Furry Freak Brothers".

Young Lust featured an all-star lineup of underground, and later alternative, cartoonists. Besides Griffith and Kinney, other frequent contributors included Justin Green, Roger Brand, Spain Rodriguez, Diane Noomin, Kim Deitch, Paul Mavrides, Michael McMillan, Ned Sonntag, Phoebe Gloeckner, and Harry S. Robins. In later years, the title was a showcase for female cartoonists like Gloeckner, M. K. Brown, Carol Lay, and Jennifer Camper; as well as rising alt-comics creators like Daniel Clowes, Charles Burns, Terry LaBan, and Lloyd Dangle.

== Publication history ==
Young Lust had multiple publishers. The comic was initially rejected by local underground publishers the Print Mint, Rip Off Press, and Last Gasp. Ultimately issue #1 (October 1970) was published by Company & Sons, an early underground press founded by John Bagley. The first printing of 10,000 copies sold out almost immediately, leading to more printings and more sales.

Despite the first issue's success, Griffith and Kinney were dubious about Company & Son's accounting practices, so they brought issue #2 to Print Mint (which later also published issue #4). Issues #3 and #5–8 were published by Last Gasp under their "Sexploitation Comics Group" imprint. Early issues were in high demand and underwent many additional printings; The Young Lust Reader (And/Or Press, 1974) collected stories from the first three issues of Young Lust. There was a ten-year gap between issues #6 (published December 1980) and #7 (published 1990).

== Issues ==
1. (Company & Sons, Oct. 1970) — contributors: Bill Griffith, Jay Kinney, Art Spiegelman (as many as 12 later printings by Last Gasp.
2. (Print Mint, July 1971) — contributors: Griffith, Kinney, Justin Green, Roger Brand (7 later printings).
3. (Last Gasp, June 1972) — contributors: Griffith, Kinney, Green, Brand, Spain Rodriguez (5 later printings).
4. (Print Mint, Nov. 1974) — full color; contributors: Griffith, Kinney, Green, Brand, Spiegelman, Spain, Robert Crumb, Kim Deitch, Diane Noomin, Ned Sonntag
5. (Last Gasp, March 1977) — contributors: Griffith, Kinney, Spain, Sonntag, Guy Colwell, Michael McMillan, Paul Mavrides (5 later printings).
6. (Last Gasp, Dec. 1980) — The "Taboo Issue": magazine-sized; contributors: Griffith, Kinney, Mavrides, Spain, McMillan, Noomin, Deitch, Phoebe Gloeckner, Gary Panter, Tom De Haven, Greg Irons, Mary Wilshire, Melinda Gebbie, Mary K. Brown, Robert Schwartz
7. (Last Gasp, 1990) — contributors: Griffith, Kinney, Mavrides, McMillan, Noomin, Gloeckner, Green, Spain, Daniel Clowes, Clare Briggs (1926 reprint), Susie Bright, Harry S. Robins, Lee Binswanger, Jennifer Camper
8. (Last Gasp, 1993) — "Sex Wars": magazine-sized; contributors: Griffith, Kinney, Robins, Sonntag, Green, Noomin, Spain, Charles Burns, Terry LaBan, Robert Triptow, Angela Bocage, Ace Backwards, Carol Lay, Jon Bailiff, Nenslo, Lloyd Dangle
