= Diane Noomin =

American comics artist (1947–2022)

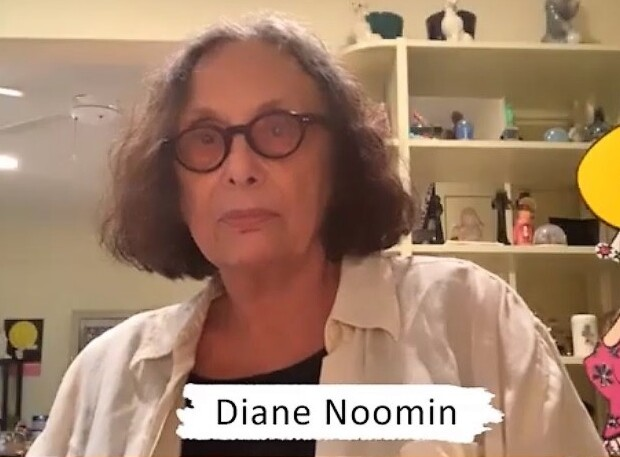
- Noomin speaks at Small Press Expo 2020
- Born: Diane Robin Rosenblatt; May 13, 1947 Brooklyn, New York, U.S.
- Died: September 1, 2022 (aged 75) Hadlyme, Connecticut, U.S.
- Areas: Cartoonist, Editor
- Notable works: Twisted Sisters; Wimmen's Comix; Glitz-2-Go
- Awards: Inkpot Award, 1992
- Spouses: Alan Newman (m. 1968; div. 1972) Bill Griffith (m. 1980)

Diane Robin Noomin (née Rosenblatt, May 13, 1947 – September 1, 2022) was an American comics artist associated with the underground comics movement. She is best known for her character DiDi Glitz, who addresses transgressive social issues such as feminism, female masturbation, body image, and miscarriages.

Noomin was the editor of the anthology series Twisted Sisters, and published comix stories in many underground titles, including Wimmen's Comix, Young Lust, Arcade, and Weirdo. She also did theatrical work, creating a stage adaptation of DiDi Glitz.

== Early life and career ==
Noomin was born the elder of two sisters in Canarsie, Brooklyn, New York City to non-observant Jewish parents. The family moved to Hempstead, Long Island, in 1952, and then back to Canarsie in 1960. She attended The High School of Music & Art, Brooklyn College, and the Pratt Institute.

Noomin's first comics work was published in 1973 in Wimmen's Comix #2, and soon after had stories in Young Lust and El Perfecto. The first DiDi Glitz story, "Restless Reverie", appeared in Short Order Comix #2 (Family Fun, 1974). Noomin's work appeared in all seven issues of Arcade, co-edited by Bill Griffith and Art Spiegelman.

In 1975, Noomin and Aline Kominsky left the Wimmen's Comix collective due to internal conflicts that were both aesthetic and political. Kominsky and Noomin put together a 36-page one-shot issue of Twisted Sisters in 1976, published by Last Gasp, which featured their own humorous and "self-deprecating" stories and art.

In 1978, Noomin edited the Print Mint one-shot Lemme Outa Here, a comics collection of stories of life in mid-century American suburbs, featuring Noomin, Michael McMillan, Robert Armstrong, Griffith, Robert Crumb, Aline Kominsky, Kim Deitch, Justin Green, Mark Beyer, and M. K. Brown.

In 1980, Noomin collaborated with Les Nickelettes, a San Francisco-based women's theater group, to produce a musical comedy based on DiDi Glitz. I'd Rather Be Doing Something Else — The DiDi Glitz Story featured Noomin's costumes and scenery, and sets by Deitch, Paul Mavrides, and Griffith. A cabaret version of the show, titled Anarchy in High Heels, was later performed at New York City's Westbeth Artists Community.

In 1984, after a ten-year hiatus, Noomin returned to the pages of Wimmen's Comix; her work appeared in almost every issue from that point forward. She was also a regular contributor to Weirdo from 1985–1993 (a period in which Weirdo was edited by Kominsky-Crumb, whose editorial tenure was informally known as "Twisted Sisters").

In 1991, Noomin edited and put together a 260-page trade paperback anthology which she called Twisted Sisters: A Collection of Bad Girl Art (Viking Penguin), featuring the work of herself, Kominsky-Crumb, and 13 other female cartoonists, including many former Wimmen's Comix contributors. All the work in the collection had been previously published, most of it in anthologies such as Weirdo and Wimmen's Comix. The success of that book led to Kitchen Sink Press publishing a four-issue Twisted Sisters Comix limited series in 1994, also edited by Noomin, with each issue featuring 44 pages of new comics by a number of female contributors. The limited series was subsequently collected in 1995 as Twisted Sisters, vol. 2: Drawing the Line.

== Personal life and death ==
Noomin's first marriage was to photographer Alan Newman; it lasted four years. Her pen name, "Noomin", was derived from her original married name.

Noomin was long involved with cartoonist Bill Griffith, whom she first met at a New Year's Eve party in San Francisco in 1972. She and Griffith lived together in San Francisco from 1972 to 1998, first in an apartment on Fair Oaks Street, and then their own house on 25th Street in Diamond Heights. They were married in Las Vegas in 1980. They lived together in Hadlyme, Connecticut, where they moved in 1998 after many years in San Francisco.

She died from uterine cancer on September 1, 2022 at the age of 75. A memorial service, hosted by the School of Visual Arts, was held for Noomin on November 10; speakers included Griffith, Art Spiegelman, Phoebe Gloeckner, Hillary Chute, Jennifer Camper, and others.

In July 2023, she was posthumously inducted into the Will Eisner Hall of Fame for her body of work.

== Awards ==
Noomin was presented with an Inkpot Award in 1992.

The Twisted Sisters anthologies were nominated for Eisner Awards for Best Anthology in 1992 and 1995.

== Bibliography ==
Cover of comix collection Glitz-2-Go

=== Books and solo works ===
- Twisted Sisters (1976–1994) — first published as a two-woman anthology (with Aline Kominsky), published by Last Gasp; later revived in various forms (anthology, limited series) edited by Noomin, published by Viking Penguin and Kitchen Sink Press
- True Glitz (Rip Off Press, 1990) — one-shot collection of DiDi Glitz comics
- Glitz-2-Go (Fantagraphics, 2012) – DiDi Glitz collection

=== Comics stories ===
==== DiDi Glitz ====
- "Restless Reverie", Short Order Comix #2 (Family Fun, 1974) — later collected in Titters: the First Collection of Humor by Women (Macmillan, 1976).
- "She Chose Crime", Wimmen's Comix #4 (Last Gasp, 1974).
- (with Bill Griffith) "Bottoms Up!" (Claude 'n DiDi), Young Lust #4 (Last Gasp, 1974).
- "Bingo Bondage", Arcade, the Comics Revue #1 (Print Mint, Spring 1975).
- "A Bitter Pill", Arcade #2 (Print Mint, Summer 1975).
- (with Aline Kominsky) "DiDi 'n Bunch in Hot Air", Twisted Sisters (Last Gasp, 1976).
- "The Fabulous World of DiDi Glitz", Twisted Sisters (Last Gasp, 1976).
- "DiDi Glitz and the 3 Bears", Arcade #5 (Print Mint, Spring 1976).
- "A Perfectly Divine Vision with DiDi Glitz", Arcade #6 (Print Mint, Summer 1976).
- "I'd Rather Be Doing Something Else" (The DiDi Glitz Story), Lemme Outa Here!: Growing Up Inside the American Dream (Print Mint, 1978).
- "Stupid Cupid", Young Lust #6 (Last Gasp, 1980).
- "Mix & Match", After/Shock: Bulletins from Ground Zero (Last Gasp, 1981).
- "Utterly Private Eye", Wimmen's Comix #9 (Last Gasp, May 1984).
- "Puttin' On the Glitz", Weirdo #13 (Last Gasp, Summer 1985).
- "DiDi Has an Orgasm", Weirdo #17 (Last Gasp, Summer 1986).
- "Glitz to Go", Weirdo #18 (Last Gasp, Fall 1986).
- "Glitz Tips", Wimmen's Comix #11 (Renegade Press, Apr. 1987).
- "A Blonde Grows in Brooklyn", Wimmen's Comics #12 (Renegade Press, Nov. 1987).
- "Don't Ask", Wimmen's Comix #14 (Rip Off Press, 1989).
- "I Had to Advertise for Love", Young Lust #7 (Last Gasp, 1990).
- "Lesbo-a-Go-Go with DiDi Glitz", Real Girl #1 (Fantagraphics, Oct. 1990).
- "I Married a Hypochondriac", Wimmin's Comics #17 (Rip Off Press, 1992).
- "Lava My Life", Young Lust #8 (Last Gasp, 1993).
- "Baby Talk: A Tale of 4 Miscarriages", Twisted Sisters #4 (Kitchen Sink, 1994).
- "Back to the Bagel Belt, with DiDi Glitz", Weirdo #28 (Last Gasp, Summer 1993).

==== Other stories ====
- "Home Agin", Wimmen's Comix #2 (Last Gasp, 1973).
- "The Agony and the Ecstasy of a Shayna Madel", Wimmen's Comix #3 (Last Gasp, 1973).
- "The Happy Couple Take Acid, or, Higamous, Hogamous, Love is Lobotomous", El Perfecto Comics (Print Mint, 1973).
- "Frozen Creeps in Space", Arcade #3 (Print Mint, Fall 1975).
- "Brillo 'n Burma", Arcade #4 (Print Mint, Winter 1975).
- "Some of My Best Friends Are", Arcade #7 (Print Mint, Fall 1976).
- "Rubberware", Wimmen's Comix #10 (Last Gasp, Oct. 1985).
- "Bare Despair" (Brillo & Burma), Weirdo #16 (Last Gasp, Spring 1986).
- "What Big Girls are Made Of", Weirdo #18 (Last Gasp, Fall 1986).
- Cover and paper dolls illustration, "Puttin' on the Glitz" (2 p.), Wimmen's Comix #11 (Renegade Press, Apr. 1987).
- "Coming of Age in Canarsie", Wimmen's Comix #15 (Rip Off Press, 1989).
- "Meet Marvin Mensch", Wimmen's Comix #16 (Rip Off Press, 1990).
- "The C Word", CHOICES (Angry Isis Press, 1990).
- "From Jawbreakers to Lawbreaker", Mind Riot: Coming of Age in Comix (Simon and Schuster, Apr. 1997).
- "I Was a Red Diaper Baby" (The Comics Journal Winter Special, 2003).

=== Editor ===
- —, ed. (Oct 1978). Lemme Outa Here. Print Mint. — contributors included Noomin, Griffith, Michael McMillan, Robert Armstrong, Robert Crumb, Aline Kominsky, Kim Deitch, Justin Green, Mark Beyer, and Mary K. Brown
- —, ed. (2019). Drawing Power: Women's Stories of Sexual Violence, Harassment, and Survival. Abrams Books. ISBN 9781419736193.
