= Zippy the Pinhead =

Fictional character in an American comic strip

- The title panel from the comic strip

Publication information
- Publisher: Print Mint; Last Gasp; King Features Syndicate; Dutton; Fantagraphics
- First appearance: Real Pulp Comics #1 (Print Mint, March 1971)
- Created by: Bill Griffith

In-story information
- Species: human or possibly alien or possibly android
- Place of origin: Earth or possibly another planet; also Dingburg
- Partnerships: Zerbina
- Abilities: philosophical non sequiturs, verbal free association

Zippy the Pinhead is the fictional protagonist of Zippy, an American comic strip created by Bill Griffith. Zippy's most famous quotation, "Are we having fun yet?", became a catchphrase. He almost always wears a yellow muumuu/clown suit with large red polka dots, and puffy, white clown shoes.

Other forms of attire may be seen when appropriate to the context, e.g. a toga. Although in name and appearance, Zippy is a microcephalic, he is distinctive not so much for his skull shape, or for any identifiable form of brain damage, but for his enthusiasm for philosophical non sequiturs ("All life is a blur of Republicans and meat!"), verbal free association, and pursuit of popular culture ephemera. His wholehearted devotion to random artifacts satirizes the excesses of consumerism.

The character of Zippy the Pinhead initially appeared in underground publications during the 1970s. The Zippy comic is distributed by King Features Syndicate to more than 100 newspapers, and Griffith self-syndicates strips to college newspapers and alternative weeklies. The strip is unique among syndicated multi-panel dailies for its characteristics of literary nonsense, including a near-absence of either straightforward gags or continuous narrative, and for its unusually intricate artwork, which is reminiscent of the style of Griffith's 1970s underground comix.

== Origin ==
Zippy made his first appearance in Real Pulp Comics #1 in March 1971, published by Print Mint.

The strip began in the Berkeley Barb in 1976 and was syndicated nationally soon after (by Rip Off Press), originally as a weekly strip. When William Randolph Hearst III took over the San Francisco Examiner in 1985, he offered Griffith an opportunity to do Zippy as a daily strip. Several months later, it was picked up for worldwide daily distribution by King Features Syndicate in 1986, appearing in 60 daily papers by 1988.

The Sunday Zippy debuted in 1990. When the San Francisco Chronicle canceled Zippy briefly in 2002, the newspaper received thousands of letters of protest, including one from Robert Crumb, who called Zippy "by far the very best daily comic strip that exists in America." The Chronicle quickly restored the strip but dropped it again in 2004, leading to more protests as well as grateful letters from non-fans.

Zippy first said "Are we having fun yet" in 1979; it was added to Bartlett's Familiar Quotations in 1992.

The strip has developed a cult following and continues to be syndicated in many newspapers.

== Characters and story ==
Zippy's original appearance was partly inspired by the microcephalic Schlitzie, from the film Freaks, which was enjoying something of a cult revival at the time, and P. T. Barnum's sideshow performer Zip the Pinhead, who may not have been a microcephalic but was nevertheless billed as one.

Griffith has never committed himself to a set origin story or time period for Zippy; no fewer than five have appeared:

- a strange visitor from another planet
- a pinhead who wandered away from the circus
- an android whose inventor didn't live to see its imperfections
- the secret identity of a jaded heir to a fortune who decided to apply Zen to everyday life
- a college student who inexplicably turned into a pinhead

Zippy's favorite foods are taco sauce and Ding Dongs. He sometimes snacks on Polysorbate 80.

Zippy's signature expression of surprise is "Yow!" Zippy's unpredictable behavior sometimes causes severe difficulty for others, but never for himself. (For example, drug dealers tried to use him as a drug mule, but lost their stash or were jailed.)

He is married to a nearly identical pinhead named Zerbina, has two children, Fuelrod (a boy) and Meltdown (a girl), both apparently in their early teens, and owns a cat named Dingy. His parents, Ebb and Flo, originally from Kansas, live in Florida. Zippy's angst-ridden twin brother Lippy also frequently appears. He is portrayed as Zippy's total opposite, often dressed in a conservative suit, thinking sequentially, and avoiding his brother's penchant for non-sequiturs. In a daily strip dated 8 March 2005, he is depicted as being deeply moved by the poetry of Leonard Cohen, the landscape paintings of Maxfield Parrish, and the music of John Tesh.

He has four close friends:

- Claude Funston, a hapless working man
- Griffy, a stand-in for Bill Griffith, who often appears in the strip to complain about various aspects of modern life to Zippy, who encourages him to mellow out
- Shelf-Life, a fast-talking schemer always looking for "the next big thing"
- Vizeen Nurney, a 20-something lounge singer who, despite her rebellious image, has an optimistic and sympathetic nature

A humanoid toad, Mr. Toad (less commonly "Mr. the Toad") who embodies blind greed and selfishness, appears occasionally (along with his wife, Mrs. Toad, and their children, Mustang and Blazer), as do The Toadettes, a group of mindless and interchangeable amphibians, who pop up here and there; and the Stupidity Patrol, described by Bill Griffith as "cruising the streets of L.A., correcting the behavior of insensitive louts". (Mr. Toad first appeared in underground strips done by Griffith in 1969.)

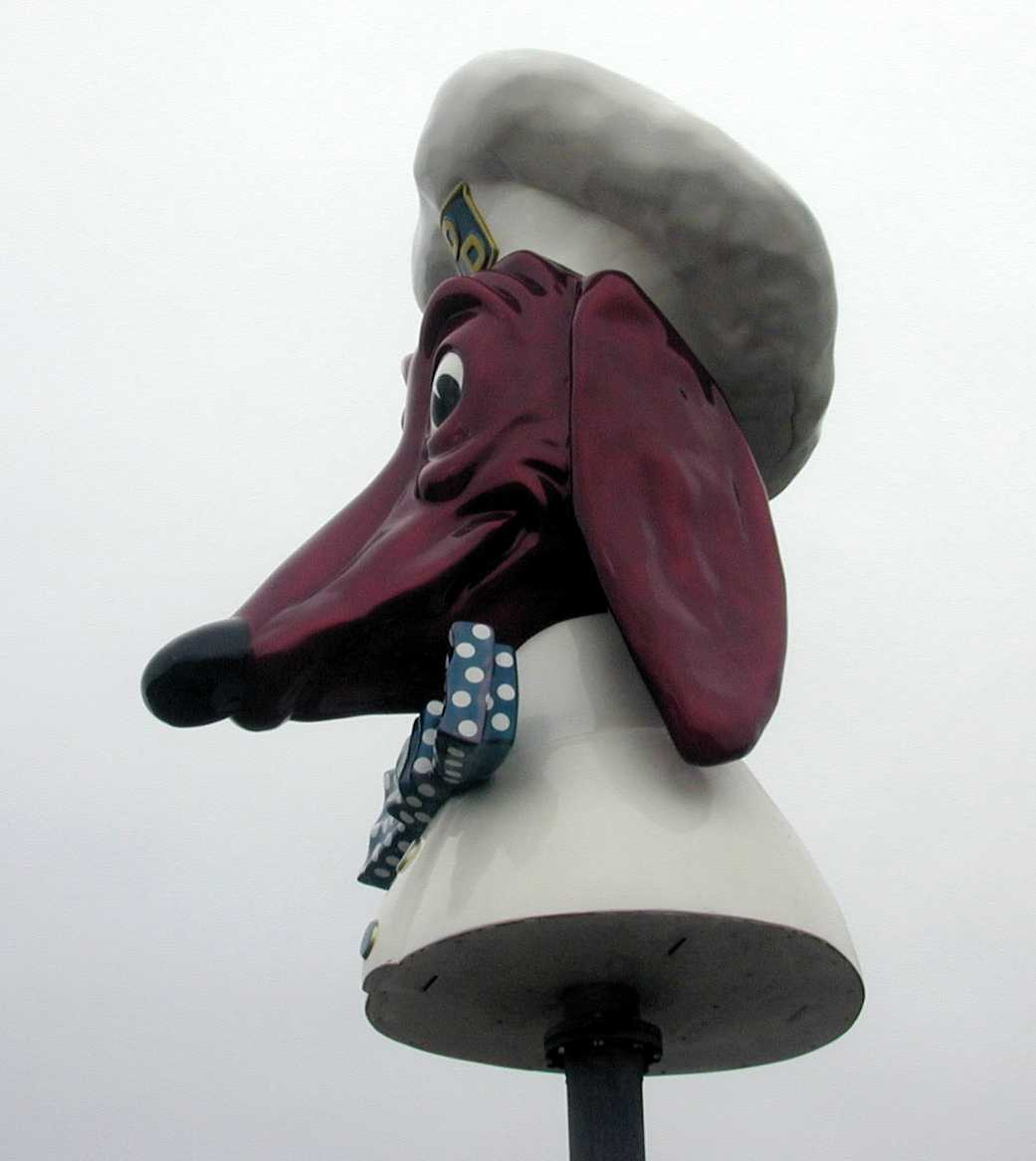
The actual sign for the San Francisco Doggie Diner, commonly portrayed in the comic strip as one of Zippy's conversational foils

Another occasionally occurring character is God, appearing either as a disembodied head or a head superimposed on various peoples' bodies. He is depicted as either conversing with Zippy on various philosophical topics, or commenting on humanity in general. Griffith's representation of God is sampled from late-1950s print advertisements for Stanback Analgesic Powders.

In his daily-strip incarnation, Zippy spends much of his time traveling and commenting on interesting places; recent strips focus on his fascination with roadside icons featuring giant beings; Zippy also frequently participates in his long-running conversation with the giant fiberglass doggie mascot of San Francisco's Doggie Diner chain (later, the Carousel diner near the San Francisco Zoo). For a while the Zippy website encouraged people to send photos of interesting places for Zippy to visit in the strip.

In 2007, Griffith began to focus his daily strip on the fictional city of Dingburg, Maryland, Zippy's "birthplace" which, according to the cartoonist, is located "17 miles west of Baltimore."

== Appearances elsewhere ==
Comedian Jim Turner appeared as Zippy on college campuses as well as in several live-action short videos alongside Diane Noomin, in character as DiDi Glitz, for a satirical campaign during the 1980 presidential election, which Griffith wrote 8 episodes of that aired on local San Francisco station KQED.

Zippy appears in the February 1984 "All Comics" issue of National Lampoon.

Following years of a Zippy movie project that was never made between 1984 and 1995, Griffith devoted dozens of strips to his real and imagined dealings with Hollywood. An animated television series, to be produced by Film Roman and co-written by Diane Noomin, was in negotiations from 1996 to 2001, but fell through after Film Roman failed to find funding.

On July 9, 2004, Zippy made his stage debut in San Francisco in Fun: The Concept at the Dark Room Theatre. Bill Griffith approved of the adaptation, though he did not work on the project. Fun: The Concept was adapted by Denzil J. Meyers with Jim Fourniadis.

A collection of about 1,000 Zippy quotes was formerly packaged and distributed with the Emacs text editor. Some installations of the "fortune" command, available on most Unix-type systems, also contain this collection. This gives Zippy a very wide audience, since most Emacs users can have a random Zippy quote printed on their screen by typing "M-x yow" and most Linux or BSD users can get a random quote by typing "fortune zippy" in a shell. However, as a result of a decision by Richard Stallman prompted by FSF lawyer Eben Moglen, motivated by copyright concerns, these quotes were erased in GNU Emacs 22. Zippy under emacs now will only say "Yow! Legally-imposed CULTURE-reduction is CABBAGE-BRAINED!". Zippy can be restored by replacing the yow file with one from an older Emacs.

After Griffith criticized Scott Adams' comic Dilbert for being "a kind of childish, depleted shell of a once-vibrant medium," Adams responded a year and half later on May 18, 1998, with a comic strip called Pippy the Ziphead, "cramming as much artwork in as possible so no one will notice there's only one joke... [and] it's on the reader." Dilbert notes that the strip is "nothing but a clown with a small head who says random things" and Dogbert responds that he is "maintaining his artistic integrity by creating a comic that no one will enjoy."

Zippy also makes an appearance in the 1995 round-robin work The Narrative Corpse where he takes the stick figure protagonist to Croatia for "peace and quiet". Another appearance can be found in the Ramones' comic book-themed 2005 compilation Weird Tales of the Ramones, consisting of Zippy asking to play "air glockenspiel" for the band.

Zippy appears in several issues of the Red Anvil Comics 2011 comic book series War of the Independents.

== Books ==
- Zippy Stories. Berkeley: And/Or Press, 1981. ISBN 0-915904-58-6. San Francisco: Last Gasp, 1986. ISBN 0-86719-325-5.
- Nation of Pinheads. Berkeley: And/Or Press, 1982. ISBN 0-915904-71-3. Reprinted, San Francisco: Last Gasp, 1987. ISBN 0-86719-365-4. Zippy strips, 1979–1982.
- Pointed Behavior. San Francisco: Last Gasp, 1984. ISBN 0-86719-315-8. Zippy strips, 1983–1984.
- Are We Having Fun Yet? Zippy the Pinhead's 29 Day Guide to Random Activities and Arbitrary Donuts. New York: Dutton, 1985. ISBN 0-525-48184-2. Reprinted, Seattle: Fantagraphics, 1994. ISBN 1-56097-149-5.
- Pindemonium. San Francisco: Last Gasp, 1986. ISBN 0-86719-348-4. Zippy strips, 1985–1986.
- King Pin: New Zippy Strips. New York: Dutton, 1987. ISBN 0-525-48330-6. Zippy strips, 1986–7.
- Pinhead's Progress: More Zippy Strips. New York: Dutton, 1989. ISBN 0-525-48468-X. Zippy strips, 1987–8.
- From A to Zippy: Getting There Is All the Fun. New York: Penguin Books, 1991. ISBN 0-14-014988-0. Zippy strips, 1988–90.
- Zippy's House of Fun: 54 Months of Sundays. Seattle: Fantagraphics, 1995. ISBN 1-56097-162-2. (Color strips, May 1990 – September 1994.)
- Zippy and Beyond: A Pinhead's Progress—Comic Strips, Stories, Travel Sketches and Animation Material. San Francisco: Cartoon Art Museum, 1997.
- Zippy Quarterly (eighteen collections, published from January, 1993 until March, 1998)—no ISBN identification for these publications.
- Zippy Annual: A Millennial Melange of Microcephalic Malapropisms and Metaphysical Muzak. ("Vol. 1", "Impressions Based on Random Data".) Seattle: Fantagraphics, 2000. ISBN 1-56097-351-X.
- Zippy Annual 2001. ("Vol. 2", "April 2001 – September 2001".) Seattle: Fantagraphics, 2001. ISBN 1-56097-472-9.
- Zippy Annual 2002. ("Vol. 3", "September 2001 – October 2002".) Seattle: Fantagraphics, 2002. ISBN 1-56097-505-9.
- Zippy Annual 2003. ("Vol. 4", "October 2002 – October 2003".) Seattle: Fantagraphics, 2003. ISBN 1-56097-563-6.
- Zippy: From Here to Absurdity. ("Vol. 5", "November 2003 – November 2004".) Seattle: Fantagraphics, 2004. ISBN 1-56097-618-7.
- Type Z Personality. ("Vol. 6", "December 2004 – December 2005".) Seattle: Fantagraphics, 2005, ISBN 1-56097-698-5.
- Connect the Polka Dots. ("Vol. 7", December 2005 – August 2006".) Seattle: Fantagraphics, 2006. ISBN 978-1-56097-777-3.
- Walk a Mile in My Muu-Muu. Seattle: Fantagraphics, 2007. ISBN 978-1-56097-877-0.
- Welcome to Dingburg. Seattle: Fantagraphics, 2008. ISBN 978-1-56097-963-0.
- Ding Dong Daddy from Dingburg. Seattle: Fantagraphics, 2010. ISBN 978-1-60699-389-7.
- Zippy the Pinhead: The Dingburg Diaries. Seattle: Fantagraphics, 2013. ISBN 978-1606996416.
