= Rory Hayes =

American cartoonist

- Born: August 8, 1949 San Francisco, California, U.S.
- Died: August 29, 1983 (aged 34) San Francisco, California
- Area: Cartoonist
- Notable works: Bogeyman; Cunt Comics; Arcade; Bijou Funnies

Rory Hayes (August 8, 1949 – August 29, 1983) was an American underground cartoonist in the late 1960s and early 1970s. His comics were drawn in an expressionistic, primitivist style and usually dealt with grim subject matter such as paranoia, violent crime, and drug abuse. In addition to his own titles, Bogeyman and Cunt Comics, he was published in many of the most prominent comics in the underground scene, including Bijou Funnies and Arcade.

== Biography ==
Hayes was born with esotropia in his left eye; later treatment was ineffective and as an adult he had mostly lost the sight in that eye. Growing up in San Francisco, Hayes moved homes frequently with his family; by the time he was ten years old the family had moved ten times. At around ten years old, Hayes began exhibiting strange behavior, possibly related to an undiagnosed personality disorder. (Others have suggested Hayes may have been on the autism spectrum.)

Hayes and his older brother Geoffrey were into popular culture and comic books, including Little Lulu, Uncle Scrooge, Sugar and Spike, Dick Tracy, and, later, EC Comics. Together, they published homemade comics, which were encouraged by their mother. All through their teens the boys continued to make comics, home-made movies, and later, fanzines, including Rory's titles Monsters and Ghouls and The Dolls Weekly. He favored drawing monsters and animals (bears, especially) over people in his work.

Hayes dropped out of high school after his sophomore year, shortly thereafter moving to New York City with Geoffrey, who was pursuing a career as an illustrator and cartoonist. (Geoffrey Hayes became a successful comic book writer and children's book artist). Moving back to San Francisco at about eighteen years old, Hayes worked as an employee at Gary Arlington's San Francisco Comic Book Company, which soon released his first published comic, Bogeyman.

Bogeyman gained Hayes some notoriety in San Francisco during this era, and he began getting illustrations gigs and other opportunities to do comics. In 1969 Hayes produced his most notorious creation, Cunt Comics, a 24-page explosion of violent, pornographic drawings (with contributions from Jay Lynch and Kim Deitch). From 1969–1976, Hayes was a regular contributor to underground anthologies such as Bijou Funnies, Snatch Comics, Skull, Insect Fear, and especially Arcade. He also began using recreational drugs, including amphetamines and LSD.

Hayes is listed as the associate editor of one of San Francisco Comic Book Company's last published projects, 1976's Buck Boy.

He was a landscape painter from 1976 until his death from a drug overdose in 1983.

== Bibliography ==
=== Creator series and collections ===
- Bogeyman #1–3 (San Francisco Comic Book Company/Company & Sons, 1969–1970) – issue #1 entirely by Hayes; issues #2-3 omnibus edited by Hayes
- Cunt Comics #1 (Apex Novelties, 1969)
- Laugh in the Dark (Last Gasp Eco-Funnies, 1971)
- Where Demented Wented: The Art and Comics of Rory Hayes (Fantagraphics, 2008) – posthumous collection of his work

=== Stories elsewhere ===
- Bijou Funnies #2 (Print Mint, 1969) – "Pober Saltine"
- Bijou Funnies #3 (Print Mint, 1969) – "Granny Crackbaggy in Stoned Again"
- Radical America Komiks (Radical America, 1969; published by Students for a Democratic Society) – "Change"
- Snatch Comics #2 (Apex Novelties, 1969) – 6 pages
- Snatch Comics #3 (Apex Novelties, 1969) – "Snot Nose Harold" (2 pp.)
- All Stars (San Francisco Comic Book Company, 1970)
- Ebon (San Francisco Comic Book Company, Jan. 1970) – 2 pages
- Skull #1 (Rip Off Press, 1970) – "Lorz"
- Slow Death Funnies #1 (Last Gasp, 1970) – "Chance for Survival" (art by Rory Hayes [as R. Hayes]; story by Geoffrey Hayes [G. Hayes])
- Hydrogen Bomb and Biochemical Warfare Funnies (Rip Off Press, 1970)
- Insect Fear #2 (Print Mint, 1972) – "The Wrath of Mazor Storn"
- Insect Fear #3 (Print Mint, Winter, 1972) – "The Midnight Monster"
- Arcade #2 (Summer 1975) – "Bleeorp! Gaggg"
- Arcade #4 (Winter 1975) – "Freak Circus"
- Arcade #5 (Spring 1976) – "Terror from the Grave"
- Arcade #6 (Summer 1976) – p. 34 "AGE of REASON" & p. 48 "A FEAR of Froaks" (art by Rory Hayes [as R. Hayes]; story by Geoffrey Hayes)
- Arcade #7 (Fall 1976) – "Dark Night"
- Weirdo #12 (Last Gasp, 1993) – 9-page story, "Popoff Hayes the Drug Fiend" (published posthumously)
