= Roger Brand =

American cartoonist

- Born: January 5, 1943 New Mexico
- Died: November 23, 1985 (aged 42) Contra Costa County, California
- Areas: Cartoonist, Writer, Penciller
- Spouse: Michele Robinson

Roger Brand (January 5, 1943 – November 23, 1985) was an American cartoonist who created stories for both mainstream and underground comic books. His work showed a fascination with horror and eroticism, often combining the two.

== Biography ==
=== Early life and education ===
Born in New Mexico, Brand grand grew up in El Sobrante, California, where he was friends with cartoonist Joel Beck. Brand and Beck were classmates at De Anza High School, and they remained lifelong friends.

=== Comics ===
Some of Brand's earliest comics work appeared in the early 1960s in the University of California, Berkeley's California Pelican humor magazine, alongside drawings by Beck.

In 1966, Brand and his wife Michele moved from Oakland, California, to New York City, specifically to break into the comics business. Brand began as an assistant to Gil Kane and Wally Wood, contributing to Wood's witzend and moving on to such publications as Creepy, Eerie, Jungle Jim and Web of Horror.

Dan Adkins, who also had been Wally Wood's assistant, remembered working with Brand:

I did a story called "The Haunted Sky." I'm not sure if that's a Creepy or Eerie story — but it was in one of the books, and I penciled the splash, and . . . because . . . I had to do something for Marvel . . . I gave it to Roger to finish. So "The Haunted Sky" . . . is my splash, a story Archie [Goodwin] wrote for me about planes . . . and Roger finished the story. . . . He helped me on that anniversary issue, the 100th issue of "Sub-Mariner versus the Hulk", Tales to Astonish, I guess. Roger helped me ink that, we inked nine pages in a week. . . . I don't know how I met Roger. Bill Pearson used to have an apartment that wasn't too far from Wally Wood. . . . You'd meet all kinds of people over at Bill's place. I probably met Roger, because I also knew Michelle, his wife. So I met her over there.

=== Underground comics ===
Tales of Sex and Death #1 (Print Mint, Apr. 1971), with cover art by Brand

By the late 1960s Roger and Michele were back in the San Francisco Bay Area.

Entering the underground comix field, Brand initially did comics for the tabloid Gothic Blimp Works, and later for such titles as Banzai!, Candid Press, Insect Fear, Tales of the Leather Nun, Yellow Dog, and Young Lust.

Brand edited and contributed to Tales of Sex and Death (two issues, 1971–1975) and Real Pulp Comics (two issues, 1971–1973). Real Pulp became a springboard for cartoonist Bill Griffith's Zippy the Pinhead. As Griffith recalled, "In San Francisco in 1970, I was asked to contribute a few pages to Real Pulp Comics #1, edited by cartoonist Roger Brand. His only guideline was to say, 'Maybe do some kind of love story, but with really weird people.' I never imagined I'd still be putting words into Zippy's fast-moving mouth some 38 years later."

In late 1976, while renting a room in Gary Arlington's house in the Mission District, Brand began working at Robert Beerbohm's comic book store Best of Two Worlds, located at 1709 Haight Street in San Francisco. When Beerbohm opened a second location at 2512 Telegraph Avenue in Berkeley in May 1977, Brand began working in that location as well, alongside Kim Deitch, Bruce Simon, and others. By then Brand had developed a severe alcohol problem coupled with the overuse of "speed".

== Personal life and death ==
Brand's wife Michele (1941–2015) was also involved in underground comix, contributing stories to such publications as It Ain't Me, Babe, Wimmen's Comix, and Arcade. Brand and Michele divorced c. 1974. She later married comics artist Bernie Wrightson and continued for many years working behind the scenes in the comics industry.

Brand died of liver failure at age 42, on November 23, 1985, in San Francisco, at Joel Beck's house, where he had been living for some time.

== Exhibitions ==
- Underground Classics: The Transformation of Comics into Comix, 1963-1990, Chazen Museum of Art (Madison, Wisconsin), May 2 to July 12, 2009.
