= Robert Williams (artist) =

American painter and cartoonist

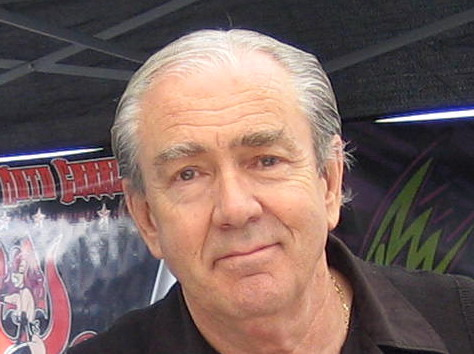
- Williams in 2007
- Born: Robert L. Williams II; March 2, 1943 (age 83); Albuquerque, New Mexico, U.S.
- Education: Los Angeles City College, California Institute of the Arts
- Known for: Painter, cartoonist
- Notable work: Appetite for Destruction, Zap Comix, Coochy Cooty
- Movement: Lowbrow art, Feral Art
- Spouse: Suzanne
- Website: robtwilliamsstudio.com

Robert L. Williams, often styled Robt. Williams (born March 2, 1943), is an American painter, cartoonist, and founder of Juxtapoz Art & Culture Magazine. Williams was one of the group of artists who produced Zap Comix, along with other underground cartoonists, such as Robert Crumb, Rick Griffin, S. Clay Wilson, and Gilbert Shelton. His mix of California car culture, cinematic apocalypticism, and film noir helped to create a new genre of psychedelic imagery.

== Early life and education ==
Robert L. Williams II was born on March 2, 1943, in Albuquerque, New Mexico, to Robert Wandell Williams and Betty Jane Spink. At a very early age he displayed an interest in drawing and in watercolor painting. He was enrolled in the Stark Military Academy in the first grade. When he was around fourteen years old, he was a member of the Albuquerque Unicycle Club.

Williams was instilled at an early age with a love for car culture. His father owned The Parkmore, a drive-in restaurant complete with carhops, which was frequented by hot rodders. Williams received his first car at twelve years old as a gift from his father: a 1934 Ford five-window coupe. References to his childhood environment can be seen throughout Williams' work, as well as in the custom hot rods which he would later build himself. He became so skillful at painting specular reflection from chromed auto parts that he later drew the chrome parts for other comix artists, who then drew the rest of the auto.

The Williams household was unstable, as his parents married each other a total of four times. During his early childhood, Williams was shuttled between Albuquerque, New Mexico, and his father's home in Montgomery, Alabama. His parents' final separation occurred in 1956, after which 12-year-old Robert lived with his mother in Albuquerque. He became a delinquent, immersing himself in hot rods, hi-jinx, and street gangs; this led to him being expelled from public school in the eleventh grade.

To avoid the possibility of jail time, Williams moved to Los Angeles in 1963 when he was twenty years old. There, he enrolled in art courses at Los Angeles City College, where he contributed artwork to the school's paper, The Collegiate, and met Suzanne Chorna, his future wife.

After that, he briefly attended the California Institute of the Arts (formerly the Chouinard Art Institute), where he was branded an "illustrator" in derogatory fashion. Now married, Williams left art school and became a professional artist in search of work. He worked for Black Belt magazine and designed containers for the Weyerhaeuser Corporation, before he found his dream job in 1965 working with Ed "Big Daddy" Roth.

== Career ==
In the late 1960s, while doing advertisements and graphics for Roth, Williams was also a productive oil painter. It was during this period that he created his "Super Cartoon" paintings. These included Appetite for Destruction (which depicts a robotic rapist about to be punished by a metal avenger) and In the Land of Retinal Delights. These paintings were meticulously created in the style of the old masters, using hand-made paints and multiple layers of varnish. The "Super Cartoon" works sold well but were very time-consuming to produce, sometimes requiring more than a year.

In 1969 Williams joined the Zap Comix collective of artists with the infamous issue number 4 of Zap Comix. He flourished within the non-conformist, anti-establishment art movement of that time, along with Robert Crumb, S. Clay Wilson, Gilbert Shelton, Spain Rodriguez, Rick Griffin, and Victor Moscoso. That same year he created Coochy Cooty, his seminal underground comix antihero. His creation was unleashed in 1970 in Coochy Cooty Men's Comics and in many issues of Zap Comix, and is still alive today in Williams's oil paintings. 1970 was also the last year of Williams employment with Roth studios.

Many of Williams' comix and "Super Cartoon" paintings were included in his first book, The Lowbrow Art of Robt. Williams, which was published in 1982 by Rip Off Press. The title of the book was meant as a statement to the highbrow tone of the art world, which was antithetical to Williams's artwork.

In the 1980s, Williams became involved with the punk rock movement and found his next audience. During this period, he published Zombie Mystery Paintings, which influenced and inspired a multitude of artists with its vibrant, sexy, and ultra-violent images. These works were done quickly, on rough canvas, and were sold via a waiting list due to heavy demand. In addition to Williams's books, the popularity of his work was established in galleries known for lowbrow art, such as Billy Shire's La Luz de Jesus Gallery, 01 Gallery, and the Tamara Bane Gallery.

Visual Addiction was Williams's next book of paintings. The works it contained were more tightly rendered and began to contain detailed background elements and vignettes. This book also contained Williams's "Rubberneck Manifesto," which stated that "Something dead in the street commands more measured units of visual investigation than 100 Mona Lisas!"

Williams published several more books as his work progressed in content, style, and size. His paintings moved from "zombie sex" to quantum mechanics and had sold-out shows on both coasts, generating demand for them from around the world. He influenced other artists and gave them a voice through publications such as Art? Alternatives in 1992, and later, Juxtapoz Art & Culture Magazine. Williams founded Juxtapoz in 1994; the magazine propelled many new artists to fame and rose to become one of the most-circulated art magazines.

The year 1997 saw the publication of the retrospective Malicious Resplendence and his one-man show at the Shafrazi Gallery in New York. Two more Shafrazi shows followed, in 2000 and 2003. These works were published in Through Prehensile Eyes in 2005.

His next one-man show was in 2009, once again at the Shafrazi Gallery; it was titled "Conceptual Realism: In the Service of the Hypothetical." A catalog of the same title was published. This exhibition moved to California State University, Northridge in 2010, where Williams provided a tour of the works, as well as a lecture defining his art movement, Colloquial or Exploratory Realism (Feral Art).

In 2010, Williams was busy with his inclusion in the Whitney Biennial at the Whitney Museum of American Art in New York and with the release of a feature-length documentary film about himself. This was titled Robert Williams, Mr. Bitchin and premiered on June 16, 2010, at the Los Angeles County Museum of Art, where it received a standing ovation. The film was produced by Rhino Films and Foundation Films and documents Williams's rise to fame from his car-culture and underground-comix roots.

On October 9, 2010, Williams was given a lifetime achievement award as part of the Beyond Eden Fair in Hollywood.

In 2011, Williams took part in the Los Angeles Art Fair and delivered another lecture on his art movement. His work was also included in the "Two Schools of Cool" show at the Orange County Museum of Art.

Williams has participated with other artists in "The Art Boys," a venture which included such notables as Gary Panter, Matt Groening, The PIZZ, Mike Kelley, Neon Park, and Mark Mothersbaugh.

In 2015, Williams achieved a 51-year goal. After attending the 1964 Salvador Dalí exhibition at the Los Angeles Municipal Art Gallery, Williams vowed to have his own work displayed in the same institution. This vision was realized in "Robt. Williams: Slang Aesthetics," which ran from February 22 thru April 19, 2015, setting the highest recorded attendance at over 20,000 visitors. The exhibition included new paintings and sculptures as well as a retrospective of past works, and was accompanied by a catalog of the same name as well as a 20-year anniversary group show for Juxtapoz magazine. Thematically, Williams postulates that slang is a valid form of communication: "In fact, slang represents freedom from pretension allowing artists to function as they please."

October 2019, Williams released a career-spanning book showcasing all of his paintings, drawings, and sculptures to date. "Robert Williams: The Father of Exponential Imagination", comprising 484 pages and weighing over 10 pounds, was also accompanied by a full retrospective exhibition of the same name at the Bellevue Arts Museum from October 4, 2019 to March 8, 2020. Of exponential imagination, Williams states: "...In the case of exponential creativity, previously existing compounded ideas pursue irrational directions as they metastasize with unmanageable poetic abstraction. In other words: a calculable explosive aberration, sometimes in the guise of art..."

== Personal life ==
Williams currently lives in the San Fernando Valley in California with his wife Suzanne, who is also a professional artist.

He is also a unicyclist.

== In popular culture ==
Robert Williams was referenced in the 1991 Red Hot Chili Peppers' song "Mellowship Slinky in B Major" on the album Blood Sugar Sex Magik.

Williams's art and personal rat rod were featured in the music video for the song "Who Was in My Room Last Night?" from the Butthole Surfers' 1993 album Independent Worm Saloon.

Williams's painting Appetite for Destruction was used as the cover art on Guns N' Roses' debut album which was also given the same name as the painting after Williams approved. Later public outrage forced Geffen Records to move the image to the inside sleeve.

Another of William's paintings is the album cover for Boogie Down Productions' last record Sex and Violence.

== Critical reception ==
The antics of Coochy Cooty and such paintings as Oscar Wilde in Leadville and Appetite for Destruction caused controversy. Here is Williams's response, excerpted from a 1992 interview:

I do not believe that my representation of females aids in their oppression. It is my artistic right to render the images of woman as my imagination sees fit. Remember, I will gladly accept the title "Bad Person" to continue my expression. In other words, nothing short of death will stop me from painting nekkid ladies.

Of his paintings, Williams has stated, "My paintings are not designed to entertain you; they are meant to trap you, to hold you before them while you try to rationalize what elements of the picture are making you stand there."

Of the term "lowbrow," Williams steadfastly denies that the term was ever meant to define his work, saying that it was merely used in the title of his first book (The Lowbrow Art of Robert Williams): "There was never any intention to make the title of my book the name of a fledging art movement, but over time, that seems to be what has transpired." And on being the driving force of the Lowbrow/Pop Surrealism art movement, he said, "It's been called Lowbrow Art and Pop Surrealism and a bunch of different names, but it's a feral art. It's an art that raised itself in the wilderness." In a 2015 phone interview, Williams emphasized: "The art movement I go by is 'Colloquial' or 'Exploratory Realism'... 'Feral Art'."

== Exhibitions and collections ==
Williams has exhibited in galleries known for lowbrow art such as Billy Shire's La Luz de Jesus Gallery, 01 Gallery, and the Tamara Bane Gallery. Known collectors of his art include Nicolas Cage, Leonardo DiCaprio, Artie Shaw, Debbie Harry, Anthony Kiedis, Von Dutch, Stanislav Szukalski, Ed Ruscha, and Timothy Leary.

- 1970-80 "Robert Williams" Jim Brucker's Movie World (Buena Park, California)
- 1980 "Robert Williams" California Alternative Gallery, (Los Angeles, California)
- 1982 "Zombie Mystery Paintings" Zomo Gallery, (Los Angeles, California)
- 1984 "Art Boys Open Class" Graffiti Gallery, (Los Angeles, California)
- 1985 "Thinking Eye", (Los Angeles, California)
- 1986 "Robert Williams" Psychedelic Solution, (New York, New York)
- 1987 "Robert Williams" La Luz De Jesus Gallery, (Los Angeles, California)
- 1987 "Messages From A Drunken Broom" Psychedelic Solution, (New York, New York)
- 1988 "Felonious Demeanor" Psychedelic Solution, (New York, New York)
- 1989 "Robert Williams" La Luz De Jesus Gallery, (Los Angeles, California)
- 1990 "Robert Williams" Tamara Bane Gallery, (Los Angeles, California)
- 1992 "Robert Williams Paintings" Bess Cutler Gallery, (New York, New York)
- 1995 "Psychopathia Aesthetica" Mambo Gallery, (Sydney, Australia)
- 1995 "Visions In The Venracular" Tamara Bane Gallery, (Los Angeles, California)
- 1997 "Malicious Resplendence" Shafrazi Gallery (New York City)
- 1998 "Robert Williams: New York" Huntington Beach art Center, (Huntington Beach, California)
- 2000 "Best Intentions" Shafrazi Gallery (New York City)
- 2005 "Robert Williams, Through Prehensile Eyes" Otis College Of Art + Design (Los Angeles, California)
- 2009 "Conceptual Realism: In the Service of the Hypothetical," Shafrazi Gallery (New York City)
- 2010 "Conceptual Realism: In the Service of the Hypothetical," California State University, Northridge
- 2010 Whitney Biennial, Whitney Museum of American Art (New York City)
- 2011 Los Angeles Art Fair (Los Angeles, California)
- 2011 "Two Schools of Cool," Orange County Museum of Art (Newport Beach, California)
- 2015 "Robt. Williams: Slang Aesthetics," Los Angeles Municipal Art Gallery (Los Angeles, California)
- 2015 "Robt. Williams: Slang Aesthetics," Museum of Sonoma County (Santa Rosa, California)
- 2016 "Robt. Williams: Slang Aesthetics," Santa Fe Museum Of Contemporary Art (Santa Fe, New Mexico)
- 2017 "Robt. Williams: Slang Aesthetics," Fort Wayne Museum Of Art (Fort Wayne, Indiana)
- 2018 "Robt. Williams: Slang Aesthetics," Louisiana State University Museum Of Art (Baton Rouge, Louisiana)
- 2019 "Robert Williams: The Father Of Exponential Imagination" Bellevue Arts Museum (Bellevue, Washington)

== Publications ==
- The Lowbrow Art of Robt. Williams (Rip Off Press, 1981; re-issued by Last Gasp, 1994)
- Zombie Mystery Paintings by Robt. Williams (Blackthorne Publishing, 1986) — introduction by Robert Crumb
- Visual Addiction: The Art of Robt. Williams (Last Gasp, 1989) — out of print
- Views from a Tortured Libido (Last Gasp, 1993)
- Malicious Resplendence (Fantagraphics, 1997)
- Hysteria in Remission (Fantagraphics, 2002)
- Through Prehensile Eyes (Last Gasp, 2005) — nominated for the Locus Award for Best Art Book
- The Hot Rod World of Robt. Williams, by Mike LaVella (Motorbooks, 2006)
- Conceptual Realism: In the Service of the Hypothetical (Fantagraphics, 2009)
- Slang Aesthetics (Baby Tattoo Books, 2015)
- Robert Williams: The Father Of Exponential Imagination (Fantagraphics, 2019)
