= Rick Griffin =

American artist (1944–1991)

- Born: Richard Alden Griffin; June 18, 1944 Palos Verdes, California, U.S.
- Died: August 18, 1991 (aged 47) Petaluma, California, U.S.
- Areas: Underground Comix, Psychedelic Posters, Album Covers, Paintings
- Notable works: Flying Eyeball, Aoxomoxoa, Pow Wow: A Gathering of the Tribes, Tales From The Tube, Man From Utopia, Zap Comix
- Awards: Inkpot Award (1976)

Richard Alden Griffin (June 18, 1944 – August 18, 1991) was an American artist and one of the leading designers of psychedelic posters in the 1960s. He was a key figure in the underground comix movement as a founding member of the Zap Comix collective. Griffin was closely identified with the Grateful Dead, designing some of their best-known posters and album covers including Aoxomoxoa. His work within the surfing subculture included both film posters and his comic strip, Murphy.

== Early life ==
Griffin was born near Palos Verdes amidst the surfing culture of southern California. Griffin biographer Tim Stephenson notes:

"His father was an engineer and amateur archaeologist and as a boy Rick accompanied him on digs in the Southwest. It was during this time that Rick was exposed to the Native American and ghost town artifacts that were to influence his later work. Rick was taught to surf by Randy Nauert at the age of 14 at Torrance Beach. The pair had met at Alexander Flemming [sic] Jr. High, and were to become lifelong friends, Rick producing much of the artwork for Randy's future band, the Challengers."

While attending Nathaniel Narbonne High School in the Harbor City area of Los Angeles, he produced numerous surfer drawings, which led to his surfing comic strip, "Murphy" for Surfer magazine in 1961, with Griffin's character featured on the front cover the following year. In 1964, he left Surfer and briefly attended Chouinard Art Institute (now CalArts), where he met his future wife, artist Ida Pfefferle as well as the Jook Savages, a group of artist-musicians with whom he took part in Ken Kesey's Watts Acid Tests on February 12, 1966. Griffin was intrigued by the psychedelic rock posters being designed by Stanley Mouse and Alton Kelley so after taking time out for a Mexican surfing trip, Rick and Ida headed to San Francisco to check out the scene.

== Career ==
=== Posters ===
Griffin and the Jook Savages arranged an art show, celebrating the one-year anniversary of the Psychedelic Shop on Haight Street for which Griffin designed his first psychedelic poster. Organizers for the Human Be-In saw his work and asked him to design a poster for their January 1967 event. Chet Helms was also impressed by Griffin's work and asked him to design posters for the Family Dog dance concerts at the Avalon Ballroom, and later for The Family Dog Denver ballroom in Denver, CO.. In 1967, Griffin, Kelley, Mouse, Victor Moscoso and Wes Wilson teamed with photographer Bob Seidemann as the founders of Berkeley Bonaparte, a company that created and marketed psychedelic posters. In February 1968 Griffin began to design posters for Bill Graham shows, first at The Fillmore Auditorium and later at the Fillmore West. The first of these posters was to become one of his best known works, the "Flying Eyeball" poster for Jimi Hendrix.

=== Comics ===
Griffin was a key figure and founding member of the Zap Comix collective. Man from Utopia (1972), Tales from the Tube (1972), and his Zap pages are considered to be his most notable comic works.

==== Comic Bibliography ====
- Zap Comix #2-9, 11, 12, 14 (The Print Mint, 1968–1998)
- Yellow Dog #2 (The Print Mint, 1968 June)
- Yellow Dog #8 (The Print Mint, 1969 February)
- Bogeyman #2 (San Francisco Comic Book Company, 1969)
- Bogeyman #3 (Company & Sons, 1970
- Changes #3 (Harbinger University Press, 1969)
- Jiz Comics (Apex Novelties, 1969)
- King Bee (Apex Novelties, 1969)
- Promethean Enterprises #1-5 (Bud Plant, 1969–1974)
- Radical America Komiks (Paul Buhle, 1969)
- Snatch Comics #2 (Apex Novelties, 1969)
- All Stars #2 (San Francisco Comic Book Co., 1970)
- The Dying Dolphin (The Print Mint, 1970)
- San Francisco Comic Book #1 (San Francisco Comic Book Company, 1970)
- San Francisco Comic Book #2 (The Print Mint, 1970)
- Man from Utopia (San Francisco Comic Book Company, 1972)
- Tales from the Tube (Surfer Publications, 1972)
- Berkeley Con Program Book (Rip Off Press, 1973)
- Eternal Comics (Last Gasp, 1973)
- Occult Laff-Parade (The Print Mint, 1973)
- Tales from the Berkeley-Con (Rip Off Press / Last Gasp, 1974)
- Zam (Zap Jam) (The Print Mint, 1974)
- Foopgoop Frolics Frantic Funnies Folio (Glenn Bray, 1975)
- Stoned Picture Parade #1 (San Francisco Comic Book Company, 1975)
- Heebie Jeebie Funnies #1 (Joel Milke, 1976)
- The Portfolio of Underground Art (Schanes & Schanes, 1980)

=== The Gospel of John ===
Griffin became a born again Christian in November 1970, which led to fundamental changes in his lifestyle and in the style and content of his art. His 1973 painting Sail on Sailor for the band Mustard Seed Faith is an example of his fine art painting from this period. His most significant 1970s project was the creation of hundreds of paintings and drawings for The Gospel of John, published by the Christian record label Maranatha! Music. He also produced much album art for Maranatha! during the 1970s and 1980s.

== Death and legacy ==
Rick Griffin died shortly after a motorcycle accident on August 15, 1991, in Petaluma, California. He was thrown from his Harley-Davidson motorcycle when he collided with a van that suddenly turned left as he attempted to pass it. He was not wearing a helmet and sustained major head injuries. He died three days later, on August 18, in nearby Santa Rosa Memorial Hospital, at the age of 47.

His work has been cited as an inspiration by well-known artist Roger Dean, known for his designs for bands such as Yes and Asia, and by Mark Wilkinson, known for his designs for bands such as Marillion, Judas Priest and Iron Maiden.

== Books ==
- McClelland, Gordon. The Art of Rick Griffin. Perigee Paper Tiger, 1980. Reprinted by Last Gasp, 2001.
- Harvey, Doug, edited by Susan Anderson. Heart and Torch: Rick Griffin's Transcendence. Laguna Art Museum, Gingko Press, 2007.
