= Jay Kinney =

American author, editor and cartoonist

- Born: 1950 (age 75–76)
- Areas: Writer, cartoonist, editor
- Notable works: Bijou Funnies; Young Lust; Anarchy Comics

Jay Kinney (born 1950) is an American author, editor, and former underground cartoonist. Kinney has been noted for "adding new dimensions to the political comic" in the underground comix press of the 1970s and '80s.

== Career ==
Kinney was a member, along with Skip Williamson, Jay Lynch and R. Crumb, of the original Bijou Funnies crew. Bijou Funnies was heavily influenced by Mad magazine, and, along with Zap Comix, is considered one of the titles to launch the underground comix movement. Kinney contributed to the first four issues (1968–1970), as well as the eighth and final issue (1973).

Next, Kinney and Bill Griffith co-edited Young Lust, an underground comix anthology published sporadically from 1970 to 1993. The title, which parodied 1950s romance comics such as Young Love, was noted for its explicit depictions of sex. Unlike many other sex-fueled underground comix, Young Lust was generally not perceived as misogynistic. Griffith and Kinney gradually morphed the title into a satire of societal mores. According to Kinney, Young Lust "became one of the top three best-selling underground comix, along with Zap Comix and Gilbert Shelton's The Fabulous Furry Freak Brothers". Kinney contributed comics stories to all eight issues of Young Lust.

In the mid-1970s, Kinney began working with fellow comics artist Paul Mavrides on "Cover-Up Lowdown", originally a weekly panel cartoon that was collected and published by Rip Off Press in November 1977. "Cover-Up Lowdown" satirized political cover-ups of the day, as well as those of recent history, such as the assassination of John F. Kennedy. Kinney and Mavrides then collaborated on the political anthology Anarchy Comics, which was published sporadically by Last Gasp between 1978 and 1987. Kinney founded, edited, and contributed to all four issues of Anarchy Comics.

Though a member of the first wave of the American underground comix movement, Kinney largely moved away from cartooning after the 1980s, first as editor of CoEvolution Quarterly from 1983 to 1984, and then as publisher and editor in chief of the magazine Gnosis from 1985 to 1999. Since the end of Gnosis, Kinney has written two books and edited an anthology, all focusing on aspects of Western esoteric traditions.

== Books ==
- The Best of Bijou Funnies (Quick Fox, 1975)
- Hidden Wisdom: A Guide to the Western Inner Traditions, with Richard Smoley (Quest Books, 2006)
- The Inner West: An Introduction to the Hidden Wisdom of the West (Tarcher/Penguin, 2004)
- The Masonic Myth: Unlocking the Truth about the Symbols, Secret Rites, and History of Freemasonry (HarperOne, 2009)
- Anarchy Comics: The Complete Collection (PM Press, 2013)
