= Justin Green (cartoonist) =

American cartoonist (1945–2022)

- Green in Married to Comics, a documentary about him and his wife Carol
- Born: Justin Considine Green; July 27, 1945 Boston, Massachusetts, U.S.
- Died: April 23, 2022 (aged 76) Cincinnati, Ohio, U.S.
- Area: Cartoonist
- Notable works: Binky Brown Meets the Holy Virgin Mary
- Awards: Eisner Hall of Fame (2023) Inkpot Award (2018)
- Spouse: Carol Tyler

Justin Considine Green (July 25, 1945 – April 23, 2022) was an American cartoonist who is known as the "father of autobiographical comics". A key figure and pioneer in the 1970s generation of underground comics artists, he is best known for his 1972 comic book Binky Brown Meets the Holy Virgin Mary.

== Biography ==
Green was born in Boston, Massachusetts, but grew up in Chicago, Illinois, the son of a Jewish father and Catholic mother; he was raised Catholic. As a child he at first attended a Catholic parochial school, and later transferred to a school where most students were Jews. He rejected the Catholic faith in 1958 as he believed it caused him "compulsive neurosis" that decades later was diagnosed as obsessive–compulsive disorder (OCD).

Green was studying painting at the Rhode Island School of Design when in 1967 he discovered the work of Robert Crumb and turned to cartooning, attracted to what he called Crumb's "harsh drawing stuffed into crookedly-drawn panels". He experimented with his artwork to find what he called an "inherent and automatic style as a conduit for the chimerical forms in [his] own psyche". He dropped out of an MFA program at Syracuse University when in 1968 he felt a "call to arms" to move to San Francisco, where the nascent underground comix scene was blossoming amid the counterculture there.

Green's short comics pieces appeared in various titles and anthologies including Art Spiegelman's and Bill Griffith's anthologies Arcade and Young Lust. But in 1972, he was overwhelmed by an urgent desire to tell the story of his personal anxieties. Binky Brown Meets the Holy Virgin Mary is a solo comic book that details Green's struggle with a form of OCD known as scrupulosity, within the framework of growing up Catholic in 1950s Chicago. Intense graphic depiction of personal torment had never appeared in comic book form before, and it had a profound effect on other cartoonists and the future direction of comics as literature. Art Spiegelman was so inspired by Binky Brown that he thought he'd try his own memoir-type story, a strip he called "Maus" which some years later became the seed of Maus.

Green was also a master sign painter, which he described during the 1980s in his monthly comic strip for the trade publication Signs of the Times, that later became a book entitled Justin Green's Sign Game (Last Gasp, June 1995).

In the 1990s, Green focused his cartooning attention on a series of visual biographies for Pulse!, the in-house magazine for Tower Records. It ran for ten years, later collected into an anthology known as Musical Legends (Last Gasp, 2004 ISBN 978-0867196214).

Green still made comics the way he did when he started, by dipping a pen nib into an ink bottle.

Justin and his wife Carol Tyler are the subject of the documentary film "Married to Comics" which presented in 2023 at the Small Press Expo event feature at the AFI Silver Theater and Culture Center.

== Personal life ==
Green's younger brother Keith Green (c. 1951–1996) was also involved in the underground comix movement, as an underground distributor from c. 1968–1975, and publishing comics under the name Keith Green Industrial Realities (as well as the imprint Saving Grace) in the period c. 1971–1977. He later became an art dealer. Keith Green died in 1996.

Justin Green lived in Cincinnati, and was married to fellow cartoonist Carol Tyler. Green and Tyler met in San Francisco in the early 1980s; they have a daughter together, Julia, who is also an artist.

Green also has a daughter Catlin (b. 1976) and was first cousins with film director William Friedkin (Green's father and Friedkin's mother are siblings).

== Death ==
Green died on April 23, 2022, in Cincinnati. His death was announced by Carol Tyler on her Facebook page.

== Bibliography ==
The following is a list of books by Justin Green.

BOOK	YEAR	PUBLISHER	NOTES
Binky Brown Meets the Holy Virgin Mary	1972	Last Gasp	Reprinted twice. First in Justin Green's Binky Brown Sampler in 1995, then by McSweeney's in 2009. ISBN 193478155X
Justin Green's Sign Game	1994	Last Gasp	Collection of comics originally published in Signs of the Times magazine. ISBN 0-944094-14-7
Justin Green's Binky Brown Sampler	1995	Last Gasp	ISBN 0-86719-332-8
Musical Legends: The Collected Comics from Pulse Magazine	2004	Last Gasp	Collection of comics originally published in Pulse! Magazine ISBN 0-86719-587-8
