= Rip Off Comix =

Underground comix anthology

- The cover of Rip Off Comix #11 (Fall 1982), when the title converted to magazine format; art by Gilbert Shelton and Paul Mavrides.

Publication information
- Publisher: Rip Off Press
- Schedule: bi-annually (1977–1983); quarterly (1987–1991)
- Format: standard (issues #1-10); magazine (issues #11–31)
- Genre: Underground
- Publication date: Apr. 1977 – 1991
- No. of issues: 30
- Main character(s): Wonder Wart-Hog; The Fabulous Furry Freak Brothers

Creative team
- Artist(s): Gilbert Shelton, Bill Griffith, Ted Richards, Justin Green, Joel Beck, Mack White, Frank Stack, Dave Sheridan, Fred Schrier, Paul Mavrides, Jean-Christophe Menu, Joe Lee, Dori Seda, Guy Colwell, Larry Todd, Spain Rodriguez, Dennis Worden, Frank Margerin, Charlie Schlingo, Mary Fleener, Bernard Willem Holtrop, Trina Robbins, Larry Welz, Mark Bodé, Joshua Quagmire, J. R. Williams, Carol Lay, Richard Sala, Nina Paley, Paul Ollswang
- Editor(s): Gilbert Shelton (c. 1982–1983); Kathe Todd (c. 1987–1991)

Rip Off Comix was an underground comix anthology published between 1977 and 1991 by Rip Off Press. As time passed, the sensibility of the anthology changed from underground to alternative comics.

The anthology was originally a byproduct of the Rip Off Press syndication service, which, starting in the early 1970s, sold weekly content to alternative newspapers and student publications. The syndication service was discontinued by 1979, but strips produced by such cartoonists as Gilbert Shelton, Joel Beck, Dave Sheridan, Ted Richards, Bill Griffith, and Harry Driggs (as R. Diggs) were published in early issues of Rip Off Comix. For much of its run, the series served as a vehicle for Shelton's work, particularly Wonder Wart-Hog and The Fabulous Furry Freak Brothers.

For a period, Rip Off Comix was billed as "the International Journal of Humor and Cartoon Art", and became a showcase for the work of European cartoonists.

== Publication history ==
The first ten issues of Rip Off Comix were standard comic book size and were published approximately every 6 months. From issue #11 onward Rip Off Comix was published magazine-size.

The title suffered a four-year hiatus between issue #12 (1983) and the next issue, #14 (1987); issue #13 was skipped in the numbering. From that point forward the title was published quarterly until it was canceled in 1991. As a result of skipping issue #13, even though the series ended with issue #31, only 30 issues were published in total.

Running for 14 years, Rip Off Comix was the second-longest-running title of any published by Rip Off Press (trailing only The Fabulous Furry Freak Brothers title).

== Overview ==
Gilbert Shelton's Wonder Wart-Hog was a recurring character in issues #1-12 (1977–1983) (with the exception of issue #7). Shelton, Tony Bell, and Joe E. Brown, Jr. collaborated on the Wonder Wart-Hog storyline "Battle of the Titans", chapters 1–5, published in issues #8-12, a collaboration that spanned 20 years from the start to the finish of the story. Wonder Wart-Hog's last appearance in the title was in issue #22, published in 1989.

Shelton's The Fabulous Furry Freak Brothers were also frequently featured in early issues, appearing in issues #1–14 (skipping only issue #7).

In addition to strips by Shelton, Beck, Sheridan, Richards, and Driggs; work by Frank Stack, and Griffith's strip "Griffith Observatory" were constants of early issues as well. One of Fred Schrier's last comics pieces appeared in issue #3 (Mar. 1978).

With issue #8 (Apr. 1981), Rip Off Comix opened the doors of the anthology to European contributors with a new feature called "Cartoonists of the World". That issue featured a section on British cartoonists, including Alan Moore, Leo Baxendale, Edwin Pouncey, Steve Moore, Edward Barker, and Terry Gilliam. Issue #9 highlighted "comix from France", including Jean-Marc Reiser, Bernard Willem Holtrop, Florence Cestac, and Charlie Schlingo.

Issue #10 had a special section on Spanish cartoonists, including Guillem Cifré, Juan Mediavilla, Miguel Gallardo, Sento, Marti Riera Ferrer (Martí), Francesc Capdevila (Max), Joaquim Aubert Puigarnau (Kim), Nazario Luque, Javier Montesol, and Simonides. Issue #11 devoted a section to Dutch cartoonists, including Joost Swarte, Kamagurka, Peter Pontiac, and Evert Geradts.

Shelton edited issues #11–12. With issue #11 (Fall 1982), Rip Off Comix converted to magazine format, adding text features as well as comix. It also began billing itself as "the International Journal of Humor and Cartoon Art". Shelton and Paul Mavrides began serializing "The Fabulous Furry Freak Brothers in The Idiots Abroad" in issues #11 and 12. Issue #12 featured Danish cartoonists, including Storm Petersen, Freddy Milton, Claus Deleuran, Ole Pihl, Peter Kielland-Brandt, Mardon Smet, Henning Kure, Sussi Bech, and Joergen Nielsen.

Spain Rodriguez and Larry Todd contributed to issue #14; issue #15 featured a number of Franco-Belgian cartoonists, including Jean-Michel Thiriet, Frank Margerin, Philippe Vuillemin, Pierre Ouin, Jean-Christophe Menu, Paul Carali, Charlie Schlingo, and Ray Goossens.

Larry Marder and Don Simpson contributed a story to issue #17.

Gilbert Shelton and the French cartoonist Pic's Not Quite Dead characters first appeared on the cover of issue #19 (Summer 1988), with their first adventure occurring in issue #25 (Winter 1989).

Regular contributors in the late 1980s-early 1990s included such notable names as Mary Fleener, Dennis Worden, Trina Robbins, Larry Welz, Mark Bodé, Joshua Quagmire, J. R. Williams, Paul Ollswang, Ace Backwords, Carol Lay, and Nina Paley, as well as R. L. Crabb, Ronn Foss, Bruce Bolinger, Wayne Honath, Douglas Michael, Lindsay Arnold, The Pizz, George Parsons, and Lyndal Ferguson.

Mack White's first professionally published story, "El Bandito Muerto", appeared in issue #26 (March 1990).

== See also ==
- Raw
- Weirdo
