= Grateful Dead Comix =

Comic book series about the Grateful Dead

- Grateful Dead Comix No. 4

Publication information
- Publisher: Kitchen Sink
- Publication date: 1991 – 1994
- No. of issues: 9

Grateful Dead Comix was a comic book title published by Kitchen Sink Press in the 1990s. The comics included lyrics from Grateful Dead songs adapted into stories, as well as material about the band itself. A total of 9 issues were published from 1991 to 1994.

Issues 1 through 7 were published in a larger, magazine format in 1991 and 1992. Volume 2 issues 1 and 2 were published in standard comic book format in 1993 and 1994.

Timothy Truman drew a number of the stories in the comic series. Nina Paley drew adaptations of the songs "Casey Jones" and "Truckin'". Other artists whose work was published in Grateful Dead Comix include Dan Steffan, Rand Holmes, Terry LaBan, Dan Burr, Mary Fleener, Gilbert Shelton, Paul Mavrides, Reed Waller, Kate Worley, Hilary Barta, William Stout, Paul Ollswang, James Vance, and Jean Giraud.

== See also ==
- Grateful Dead Origins – a 2020 graphic novel about the rock band the Grateful Dead
