= Fred Schrier =

American cartoonist

- Born: 1945 (age 80–81) Ohio
- Areas: Cartoonist, illustrator, animator
- Pseudonym: Overland Vegetable Stagecoach (with Dave Sheridan)
- Notable works: Mother's Oats Comix; Meef Comix
- Collaborators: Dave Sheridan

Fred Schrier (born 1945 in Ohio) is an artist, writer, and animator, best known as partner to the underground comic book artist Dave Sheridan. Together, using the name "Overland Vegetable Stagecoach," they worked on Mother's Oats Comix, published by Rip Off Press from 1970 to 1976.

Schrier's work was also featured in Meef Comix (Print Mint) and The Balloon Vendor (Rip Off Press), and the anti-Nixon comics pamphlets Silent Majority Comics and Uncle Sam Takes LSD (both published by Rip Off Press). Schrier's solo appeared in Slow Death Funnies #1 (with J. Osborne and Gilbert Shelton), published by Last Gasp, Skull Comics #1 (Rip Off Press), and Yellow Dog #19, published in 1971 by The Print Mint.

Schrier served with the Peace Corps in Afghanistan in the mid-1970s and the focus of his work changed afterward.

Sheridan died of cancer at the age of 38 in 1982. An obituary by Schrier was published in the ACE periodical Changeling Times, illustrated with their artwork.

Schrier has also been an illustrator of children's books such as Let's Jump!, written by Donna Lugg Pape and published by Houghton Mifflin, "Amazing Science Tricks" (published in Boys' Life), and was the animator for the Cleveland Indians stadium scoreboard, winning him a "thanks" credit in the 1994 motion picture Major League II.

== Bibliography ==
=== Solo titles ===
- Silent Majority Comics (Rip Off Press, 1970) — photocopied minicomic
- Uncle Sam Takes LSD (Rip Off Press, 1972) — photocopied minicomic

=== Overland Vegetable Stagecoach ===
- Mother's Oats Comix #1 (Rip Off Press, 1969)
- Mother's Oats Comix #2 (Rip Off Press, 1970)
- Mindwarp: An Anthology by Sheridan & Schrier (And/Or Press, 1974)
- Mother's Oats Comix #3 (Rip Off Press, 1976)

=== Other comix ===
- Slow Death Funnies #1 (Last Gasp, 1970) — with Sheridan, Jim Osborne, Gilbert Shelton, and others
- Skull Comics #1 (Rip Off Press 1970) — with Dave Sheridan, Greg Irons, Jack Jackson and Rory Hayes
- Hydrogen Bomb and Biochemical Warfare Funnies (Rip Off Press, 1970)
- Yellow Dog #19 (Print Mint, 1971)
- The Rip Off Review of Western Culture (Rip Off Press, 1972)
- The Balloon Vendor (Rip Off Press, 1971) — with Sheridan
- Meef Comix #1 (Print Mint,1972)
- Meef Comix #2 (Print Mint, 1973)
- Rip Off Comix #3 (Rip Off Press, Mar. 1978)

=== Children's books & stories ===
- (with writer Donna Lugg Pape) Let's Jump! (Houghton Mifflin, 1991) — part of the Read Alone Books series Wild Animals, Come Out!
- "Amazing Science Tricks" (Boys' Life, April 2004)
