= DiCaprio (surname) =

DiCaprio or Di Caprio is an Italian surname. Notable people with the surname include:

- George DiCaprio (born 1943), American writer, editor, publisher, distributor, and former performance artist
- Leonardo DiCaprio (born 1974), American actor and film producer

== See also ==
- DiCaprio (disambiguation)
