= Slow Death (comics) =

Underground comix anthology series, 1970-1992

- Slow Death Funnies #1, 1970. Artwork by Greg Irons.

Publication information
- Publisher: Last Gasp
- Schedule: annual
- Format: Ongoing series
- Publication date: 1970 - 1992
- No. of issues: 11

Creative team
- Written by: Ron Turner, Tom Veitch, George DiCaprio, Alan Moore
- Artist(s): Gary Grimshaw, Dave Sheridan, Jim Evans, Greg Irons, Gilbert Shelton, Fred Schrier, Rory Hayes, Jaxon, Kim Deitch, Robert Crumb, Tony Auth, Richard Corben, Larry Welz, George Metzger, Rand Holmes, William Stout, William York Wray, Melinda Gebbie, Michael T. Gilbert, Roger Brand, Guy Colwell, Bryan Talbot, Graham Manley, Wally Wood
- Editor: Ron Turner

Slow Death is an underground comix anthology published by Last Gasp, the first title published by the San Francisco Bay Area-based press. Conceived as an ecologically themed comics magazine (in conjunction with the first Earth Day), the title's "underlying theme was always about what the human race was doing to damage the native planet." Frequent contributors to Slow Death included Greg Irons, Jaxon, Dave Sheridan, Richard Corben, Jim Osborne, Tom Veitch, and Dennis Ellefson. Released sporadically from 1970 to 1992, 11 issues were published in all.

== Publication history ==
The first issue, titled Slow Death Funnies, was produced by San Francisco State University graduate student Ron Turner as a benefit for a local ecology center. Turner borrowed $2,500, and with the help of San Francisco Comic Book Company's Gary Arlington, printed 20,000 copies, which were published on April 15, 1970. The first issue was copyrighted by the "Visual Yoyo Tribe," a Berkeley-based collective of which Turner was a member.

New issues, now simply titled Slow Death, were published annually through 1974, when the title went on hiatus until 1976. Two issues were published in 1977 and then the title went annual again through 1979. After a 13-year gap, the final issue in the series, Slow Death #11, was published in 1992.

== Themes and contributors ==
Slow Death Funnies #1 featured underground comix stars such as Robert Crumb, Kim Deitch, Jaxon, Rory Hayes, Fred Schrier, Dave Sheridan, Gilbert Shelton, Gary Grimshaw, Greg Irons, and Jim Evans taking on such targets as the auto industry, corporate polluters, litterers, and other perceived abusers of the planet. The second issue took on a post-apocalyptic science fiction theme, with dark stories by Jaxon, Dave Sheridan, Jim Osborne, and Richard Corben.

Science fiction stories continued throughout the series, but with issue #5, each issue's theme became connected to real-world issues: Richard Nixon, true war stories, Greenpeace, nuclear power, cancer, and other topics.

The final issue, published 13 years after issue #10, and focused on energy conservation, featuring stories by (among others) Alan Moore & Bryan Talbot, Graham Manley, and Wally Wood. Greg Irons contributed to 8 of the 11 issues, while Jaxon had stories in 6 issue overall.

== Issues ==
1. (Apr. 1970) — contributors: Gary Grimshaw, Dave Sheridan, Jim Osborne, Jim Evans, Greg Irons, Gilbert Shelton, Fred Schrier, Rory Hayes/Jeffery Hayes, R. Cobb, Jaxon, Kim Deitch, Robert Crumb, Tony Auth, Randy Tuten
2. (Dec. 1970) — contributors: Jaxon, Sheridan, Osborne, Richard Corben
3. (Nov. 1971) — contributors: Corben, Sheridan, Osborne, Jaxon, Larry Welz, Irons
4. (Nov. 1972) — contributors: Corben, Sheridan, George Metzger, Tom Veitch/Irons, Jaxon, Eric Kimball
5. (Apr. 1973) — "We agree Nix--un!" issue; contributors: Rand Holmes, Sheridan, Veitch/Irons, Charles Dallas, Corben
6. (Jan. 1974) — "Call of the Wild" issue; contributors: Holmes, Ron Turner/Holmes, Dallas, Metzger, Jaxon
7. (Winter 1976/1977) — "True War Tales" issue; contributors: William Stout, Jaxon, Irons, George DiCaprio/John Edgar, William York Wray, Errol McCarthy, Melinda Gebbie, Irons
8. (July 1977) — Greenpeace issue; contributors: Stout, Irons, Brenda Bernu, Michael J. Becker, Doug Hansen, Michael T. Gilbert, Sam Wray, Roger Brand, Shelby Sampson, Dennis Ellefson, Tim Boxell
9. (Aug. 1978) — "Our Friend Mr. Atom" issue; contributors: Irons, Becker, Ellefson, McCarthy, Boxell
10. (Nov. 1979) — "Cancer special"; contributors: Irons, Ellefson, Guy Colwell, DiCaprio/Warren Greenwood, Janet Abbey/Irons, Boxell
11. (1992) — "Energy!" issue; contributors: Irons, Veitch/Irons, Alan Moore/Bryan Talbot, Peter Sinclair, Graham Manley, R. Waldmire, Edgar, Greenwood, Wally Wood
