= Pat Ryan (artist) =

American poster artist

- Born: 1941; New Rochelle, New York, U.S.
- Education: Art Center School
- Occupation: Poster artist
- Years active: 1970s–
- Website: pat-ryan-art.com

Pat Ryan (born 1941) is an American poster artist and cartoonist. He is known for his 1970s poster art for albums, concerts, and parody.

Marie Thomas McNaughton of The Press Democrat of Santa Rosa, California, wrote that Ryan is "best known for: images of American Indians, historical paintings, Prairie Sun calendars. .... If Pat Ryan of Rohnert Park had not deconstructed and reconstructed the images and typography of the Old West, could sepia have become hip or the graphic image of the American Indian become dignified, colorful, and contemporary?"

== Early life and education ==
Ryan was raised on Long Island, New York. He later moved to California and attended Art Center School in Los Angeles.

== Poster art ==
Ryan was one of the founders of the "Artista Gang" artist collective.

Paul Liberatore of the Marin Independent Journal wrote that, "Ryan may best be remembered for the produce crate art he began creating in the '70s for fictional marijuana brands like Humboldt Honey, Super Skunk, Stupor Farms, and the ever-popular Muy Blastido." He co-created the art with cartoonist Dave Sheridan, and worked with him at C.O.D. Graphix.

Lincoln Cushing, author of Chinese Posters: Art from the Great Proletarian Cultural Revolution, wrote that Ryan's posters are an example of art that was either a homage to, or a parody of, Chinese Communist Party propaganda posters that became "fodder ... for the U.S. counterculture".

== Comics ==
Ryan contributed to the four-issue Tales of the World Famous Drive Thru Bud. He also contributed to the one-shot underground comic Tales from the Leather Nun, published in 1973.

== Bibliography ==
- Ryan, Pat (2011). Sinsemilla Sinsations: Cannabis-Inspired Art Spanning Four Decades. San Francisco: Last Gasp. OCLC 726821689.
