= Wonder Wart-Hog =

- Wonder Wart-Hog: the Hog of Steel #1 (Millar Publishing Company, 1967).

Publication information
- Publisher: Millar Publishing Company; Print Mint; Rip Off Press; Last Gasp
- First appearance: "Fearless, Fighting, Foulmouthed Wonder Wart-Hog" in Bacchanal (Mar. 1962)
- First comic appearance: Feds 'N' Heads (1968)
- Created by: Gilbert Shelton & Tony Bell

In-story information
- Alter ego: Philbert Desanex
- Species: Phacochoerus
- Place of origin: Squootpeep
- Notable aliases: The Hog of Steel
- Abilities: Flight, super strength, invulnerability

Wonder Wart-Hog (the "Hog of Steel") is an underground comic book character, a porcine parody of Superman, created by American cartoonist Gilbert Shelton and first published in 1962. Over the years, Shelton has worked on the strip in collaboration with various writers and artists, including fellow UT Austin alums Tony Bell, Bill Killeen, and Joe E. Brown Jr.

The humor of Wonder Wart-Hog works on many levels. Fundamentally, it is slapstick comedy in which excessive force is a constant theme, but it also parodies the McCarthyism and violence of the far right. Wonder Wart-Hog is a pro-establishment, law and order type personality, often gone overboard. For example, he's willing to kill a lady driver talking on her cell phone because she might cause an accident.

Wonder Wart-Hog's rogues gallery includes "Super-Fool, Super-Hypnotist, the Masked Meanie, Super-Patriot, the Plastic Man, the Granny of Gruntville, the Bad Brainbender, Pie Man, the International Order of Bomb-Flinging Fiends, the Amazing Meanie Fuel, the Famous Rushin' Bear, Evil Weevil, the Mafia, the Zymotic Zookeeper, Smiling Sergeant Death, the Elusive Chimerical Chameleon, and the Pigs from Uranus, among others".

The zany showdowns involve contests such as backward motorcycle races (who can go the slowest) or exposing some villain running a fraud scheme such as comet insurance. Wonder Wart-Hog dispatches his enemies in various ways, such as grinding them into sausage, flinging them into orbit, or crushing them with his immense bulk. But on one occasion he punished a lynch mob by giving them Cadillacs and TV sets, and then banishing them to Mississippi.

Gilbert's humor occasionally crosses the line into violence of a sexual nature, but the emphasis is more on the absurdity of the situation than the act itself.

== Fictional character biography ==
Wonder Wart-Hog is the son of the rulers of the planet Squootpeep, sent to Earth by rocket when Squootpeep's scientists predict the planet will soon explode (in fact it does not). The infant porker is raised in America by hillbillies, not out of affection, but because his invulnerability prevents his being killed and cooked.

His secret identity is the mild-mannered reporter Philbert DeSanex, who works for the Muthalode Morning Mungpie. Instead of being a human disguised as a rubber-masked monster, Wonder Wart-Hog is a pig-faced monster who disguises himself as a rubber-faced human. Occasionally, however, Shelton has depicted Wonder Wart-Hog and DeSanex as two distinct individuals, with Wonder Wart-Hog residing inside the reporter's body.

Wonder Wart-Hog's one-time love interest is Lois Lamebrain — an analog of Lois Lane — whom he rapes with his snout and kills accidentally when he sneezes.

== Origin and publication history ==
The idea for Wonder Wart-Hog came to Gilbert Shelton in 1961, while he was living in New York. The following year, Shelton moved back to Texas to enroll in graduate school and get student deferment from the draft. The first two Wonder Wart-Hog stories appeared in Bacchanal, a short-lived college humor magazine produced by former staffers at UT's humor magazine The Texas Ranger, in the winter/spring of 1962. Shelton then became editor of The Texas Ranger (where he had first published work in 1959) and published more Wonder Wart-Hog stories. The character attracted the attention of Mademoiselle, which wrote about Wonder Wart-Hog in the August 1962 "College" issue. Harvey Kurtzman's Help! also published a few of the Hog of Steel's adventures in 1964–1965.

=== Drag Cartoons ===
Pete Millar's Drag Cartoons magazine published a Wonder Wart-Hog strip in the early 1960s. The first ongoing publication of Wonder Wart-Hog was in Drag Cartoons issues #25-49 (1966–1968); several of those also featured another Shelton strip called Bull O'Fuzz. Issue #45 boasted several strips by Shelton, including a parody of West Side Story called "Vice Squad Story".

Many of these strips were reprinted in 1968, when Millar Publishing Company released two issues of a quarterly Wonder Wart-Hog Magazine. 140,000 copies of each were printed, but distributors did not pick up the magazine and only 40,000 of each were sold.

The following stories from Drag Cartoons have never been reprinted:

- #26 "Constructs a Wheelie-Turnin’ Toronado" (Apr. 1966)
- #27 "Goes to Viet Nam" (May 1966)
- #28 "Meets the Menace of the Plastic Man" (June 1966)
- #30 "Meets The Granny of Gruntville" (Aug. 1966)
- #31 "Masked Meanie's Marine Malfeasance" (Sept. 1966)
- #32 "Meets the Bad Brainbender" (Oct. 1966)
- #33 "Pie Man's Funny Car" (Nov. 1966)
- #34 "Meets The Dread Nazi Menace" (Dec. 1966)
- #40 "Meets Evil Weevil" (June 1967)
- #41 "Becomes an Ace Photographer" (July 1967)
- #42 "Gets a Flame Suit!" (Aug. 1967)

=== Underground comix ===
Wonder Wart-Hog's adventures were serialized in comic strip form in many underground newspapers and college newspapers from the mid-1960s through 1977.

In 1968, while still living in Austin, Texas, Gilbert self-published Feds 'N' Heads, which featured Wonder Wart-Hog as well as Shelton's other creation, The Fabulous Furry Freak Brothers. Feds 'N' Heads was later reprinted multiple times by the Bay Area underground publisher Print Mint.

Beginning late 1968, Wonder Wart-Hog began appearing in Zap Comix; he ultimately appeared in issue #3-5, 13, and 15 (the latter comic, published by Last Gasp in 2005, is the most recent appearance of the "Hog of Steel").

A Wonder Wart-Hog story also appeared in Radical America Komiks (Students for a Democratic Society, 1969), vol. III, #1 of Radical America, an SDS magazine.

=== Rip Off Press ===
By 1969, Shelton had moved to San Francisco, and that year he co-founded the underground publisher Rip Off Press with three friends from Texas: fellow cartoonist Jack Jackson, Fred Todd, and Dave Moriaty. Rip Off Press published the bulk of all later Wonder Wart-Hog comics. The character appeared in Rip Off Comix #1-12 (1977–1983) (with the exception of issue #7) and in several of the magazine-sized issues of Rip Off. His last new appearance in Rip Off Comix was in the 20th anniversary issue (#21) 1988.

Many of the Wonder Wart-Hog stories from Rip Off Comix were collected in three comic books from Rip Off Press in the mid-1970s, (Not Only) The Best of Wonder Wart-Hog. These three issues reprint all of the Rip Off stories (but not all of the covers and single page appearances) except for the following:

- "Battle of the Titans" chapters 3–5 (Rip Off #10-12) — also released as a stand-alone comic; a collaboration among Shelton, Bell, and Joe E. Brown, Jr. that spanned 20 years from the start to the finish of the story.
- "Philbert Dessanex and the Street Entertainer" (Rip Off #14).

In addition, the story from Radical America Komiks was reprinted in Wonder Wart-Hog and the Nurds of November, a trade paperback published by Rip Off Press in 1980, which included a large collection of earlier material. That story was also released as a stand-alone comic book version in 1988.

Wonder Wart-Hog also appeared in the following one-shot Rip Off Press titles:

- Underground Classics #5: "Wonder Wart-Hog Vol. 1" (1987)
- Underground Classics #7: "Wonder Wart-Hog Vol. 2" (1988)
- Underground Classics #12: Gilbert Shelton in 3D (1990)

Three stories about Philbert Desanex from the trade paperback collection were released as a stand-alone comic, Philbert Desanex' Dreams (Rip Off Press, 1993). The stories center almost entirely around Wonder Wart-Hog's alter ego, with only a brief appearance by the Hog of Steel.

== In popular culture ==
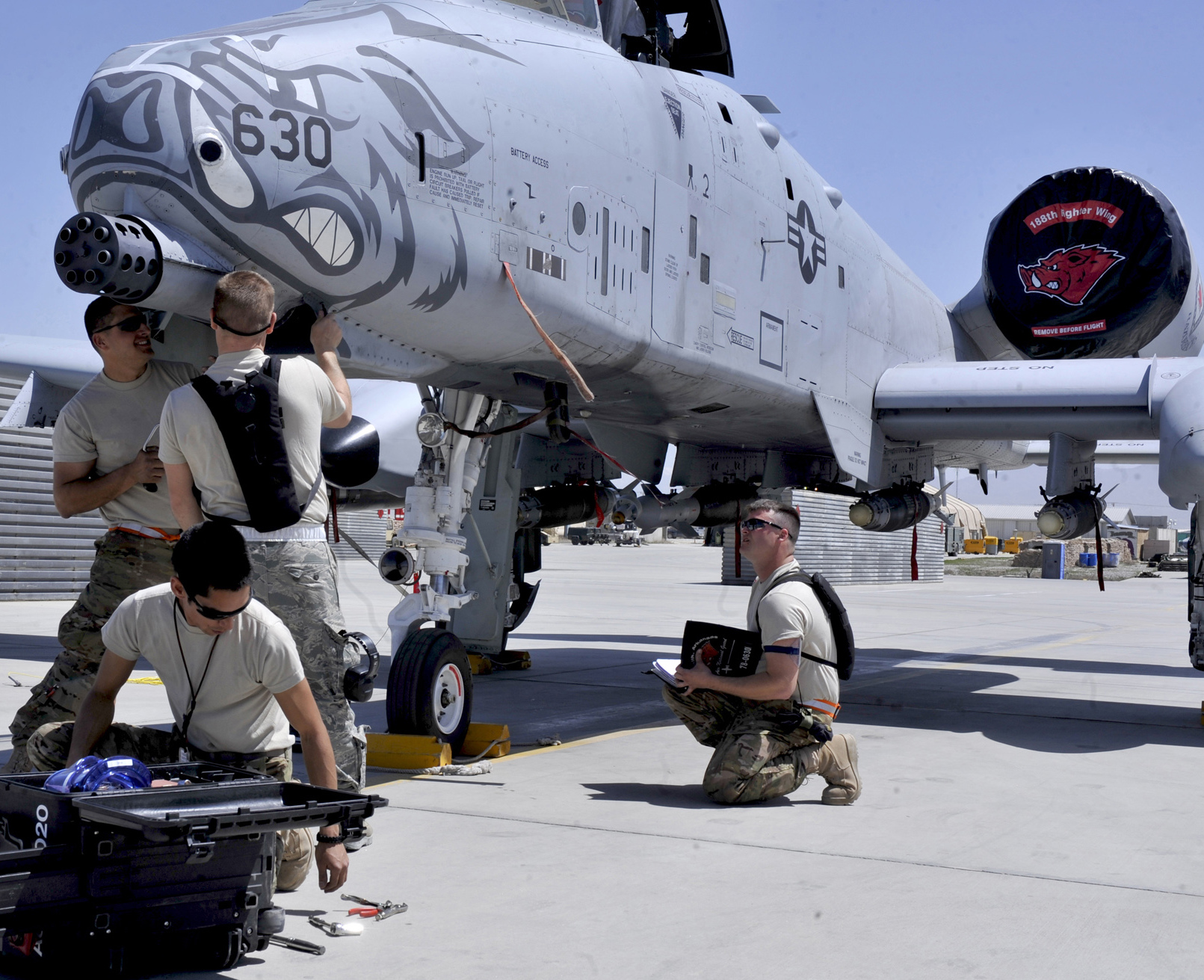
The USAF A-10 Warthog dates to the mid-1970s, the Wonder Warthog era.

Australian cartoonist Tony Edwards's best-known creation, Captain Goodvibes, was inspired by Wonder Wart-Hog.

The lyrics for the Pink Fairies' "Pigs Of Uranus" (from the 1972 album What a Bunch of Sweeties) are taken from "Wonder Warthog and the Invasion of the Pigs from Uranus!" (Hydrogen Bomb and Biochemical Warfare Funnies, Rip Off Press, 1970).

== Bibliography ==
- Shelton, Gilbert (1980). Wonder Wart-Hog and the Nurds of November (1st ed.). San Francisco: Rip Off Press. ISBN 0-89620-083-3.
