= The Rip Off Review of Western Culture =

- The Rip Off Review of Western Culture #1 (June/July 1972). Cover photo by Michael Heinichen.
- Editor: J. David Moriaty; Bob Follett; Dave Sheridan; Jane T. Gaynor, and Ramsey Wiggins
- Categories: underground comic magazine
- Frequency: Bi-monthly
- Publisher: Rip Off Press
- First issue: June/July 1972
- Final issue: Nov./Dec. 1972
- Country: United States
- Language: English

The Rip Off Review of Western Culture was an underground comics magazine published by Rip Off Press and produced out of San Francisco, California. It published three issues in 1972. The publication was historically significant in that it brought together the work of many noteworthy underground artists and writers.

== Publication history ==
J. David Moriaty conceived of The Rip Off Review of Western Culture in 1971, desiring to publish a real magazine with writing, photographs, and comics. Moriaty asked Robert Follett to serve as the magazine's editorial director, a job which entailed contributing interviews and editing the magazine. Dave Sheridan, already a well-known cartoonist and underground comic artist, was given the title of art editor.

Follett and a couple of others managed to publish first issue of The Rip Off Review of Western Culture in June 1972. A magazine and comic book mix, the artists, writers, and photographers contributed many different styles and stories to the magazine. The magazine was distributed through various underground outlets, with a limited amount of money.

Ramsey Wiggins stepped in as the managing editor on the second issue and was asked to write a column and a few of the editorials.

== Issues ==
=== #1 (June/July 1972) ===
- Editor and Publisher: J. David Moriaty
- Editorial Director: Robert Follett
- Art Editor: Dave Sheridan
- Managing Editor: Janie T. Gaynor
- "Editor at Sea": Billy Lee Brammer

The first issue was 84 pages, and contained very few ads. The editorial staff, along with Bruce Jackson, a photographer from New York, had determined to keep the total production of the magazine in house for absolute control of quality and costs. The cover for the first issue, features Dave Sheridan, taken by photographer Michael Heinichen. It was the most difficult cover to print, which required large areas of solid black ink. J. David Moriaty had worked hard with the staff to save this difficult run. After many long days, he managed to print the covers without too many defects to the magazine. This saved the first issue, due to the lack of money Rip Off Press had in their budget.

The artist Monjett Graham originally from Nebraska, wrote a regular column on culture for The Sun Reporter, an African-American newspaper, located in San Francisco. This was about the time he was approached by the Rip Off Review of Western Culture staff and asked if he would contribute to the magazine. Graham contributed two pieces of artwork to the first issue. The first one, called Urban Mood, appears on page 15. This piece was created with woodcuts and pencil. The second piece, Occupation, is woodcuts only, and features a soldier with a helmet.

- Writers:
- Lewis McAdams and Tom Clark- Texas Years
- Bruce Jackson -"Prison" and "Henry"
- J. David Moriaty -The Great County Prison Expose' Fiasco pg 13
- Jubal Washcloth- The Pleasure Palace of Space pg 18
- Robert Follett- A Little Something for Mom pg 22
- P. J. O'Rourke- A.J. at N.Y.U. pg 26
- James Langdon-Easter Present pg 30
- Fred Schrier, Uncle Sam Takes LSD -insert
- William Ellis- Great Galveston Bay Dope Disaster pg 34
- Bruce Jackson Henry pg 44
- Ron Siegel-Psychedelics Revisited pg 54
- Lennart Bruce- The Whore pg 60
- Artists
- Joel Beck
- Jim Franklin
- Monjett Graham
- Jack Jackson Jaxon
- Victor Moscoso
- Vin Scheihagen
- Fred Schrier, Uncle Sam Takes LSD -insert-
- Larry Welz
- S. Clay Wilson
- Gilbert Shelton
- Photographers
- Elihu Blotnik pg 41
- Michael Heinichen - Cover
- William Irwin pg 35-39
- Bruce Jackson photos of the prison system appeared in the 1st edition. The piece is called "Prison". pg 8-12

=== #2 (Aug./Sept. 1972) ===
Cover art of the second issue, August/September 1972, illustration by Victor Moscoso.

Back cover art of the second issue, August/September 1972, Presidential election ad to vote.

- Editor and Publisher: J. David Moriaty
- Editorial Director: Robert Follett
- Art Editor: Dave Sheridan
- Managing Editor: Ramsey Wiggins
- Southwestern Corespondent: Bill Dormam

The second issue is a collection of articles, stories, pictures, illustrations, and comics. The cover is an illustration by Victor Moscoso, who contributed many others to the magazine. This issue features several articles, such as a two part interview/story on Dennis Hopper called "Acting Strange: Hopper's Nickbag Medicine Show Comes To Dime Box", written by M.D. Shafter; and "The Loan Arranger", a piece of creative nonfiction by Bob Chorush. In addition, featured in this issue was artist/writer Tullio, who contributed a regular column entitled "Mindstream". Cartoonist Frank Stack provided the comic "Jesus Goes To The Faculty Party".

- Writers
- Bob Chorush — "The Loan Arranger" pg 10
- Susan Netzorg — "Funky Fables" pg 13
- Chris Miller — "Hippie" pg 17
- M. D. Shafter — "Acting Strange, featuring Dennis Hopper" pg 18
- Frank Stack — "Jesus Goes to the Faculty Party" pg 25
- Liv Peterson — "Poetry" pg 49
- Tom Pope — "Media Review" pg 60
- Tullio DeSantis — "Mindstream" pg 64
- Artists
- Jack Jackson Jaxon
- Tullio DeSantis
- Gilbert Shelton
- Larry Welz
- S. Clay Wilson
- Victor Moscoso
- Kerry Fitzgerald
- Gary Frutkoff
- Phil Romero
- Frank Stack
- Photographers
- Richie Fiddler
- Peter Gent

=== #3 (Nov./Dec. 1972) ===
Cover art of the third issue, November/December 1972, Painting by Jim Franklin.

- Editor and Publisher: J. David Moriaty
- Editorial Director: Robert Follett
- Art Editor: Dave Sheridan
- Managing Editor: Ramsey Wiggins
- Southwestern Correspondent: Bill Dormam

The third issue consists of an editorial written by J. David Moriaty on the Presidential election of 1972 and the United States consumption of gasoline. On page three of this issue the "Liner Notes" describes the main contributors to "The Rip Off Review of Western Culture". Jim Franklin provided the artwork for the cover, which is a parody of the artist Porfirio Salinas work. Also in this issue is a detailed interview by the editorial director Robert Follett, with S. Clay Wilson, known as one of the best American underground cartoonist in the 1970s. Tom Pope contributed a regular column, entitled "The Morning Stage" along with Tullio DeSantis who winds up the magazine with his regular column known for his cosmic note "Mindsteam".

- Writers
- M.D. Shafer-Acting strange part II pg 12
- Ty Hunt-Armadillo Festival pg18
- Ken Green-Several Final Solutions pg 23
- Pat Ryan and P. Delacorte- Fun and Games pg28
- Ron Siegel-You're Just Another Animal that Turns On
- S. Clay Wilson: An Interview pg 38
- Will Hatcher-Will Hatcher Sells His Soul pg 46
- W.E. Ellis
- Tom Pope-Morning Stage pg 62
- Tullio DeSantis-Mindstream pg 64
- Lieuen Adkins- Craddock's Crusade pg 55
- Mary Carter-Record Reviews pg 61
- David Dean
- Ricky Morsund
- Artists
- Jack Jackson (Jaxon)
- Gilbert Shelton
- S. Clay Wilson
- Tullio DeSantis
- Kerry Fitzgerald also known as Kerry Awn
- Gary Frutkoff
- Jim Cherry
- Pat Ryan
- William Klapp
- Kim Verstraten
- Photographers
- Ike Baruch
- Peter Gent
