= Tales from the Leather Nun =

Underground comic

Publication information
- Publisher: Last Gasp
- Format: Standard
- Genre: Underground
- Publication date: 1973
- No. of issues: 1

Creative team
- Artist(s): Dave Sheridan, Robert Crumb, Spain Rodriguez, Jaxon, Roger Brand, Pat Ryan

Tales from the Leather Nun was an American underground comic published by Last Gasp in 1973. It was a one-shot anthology of bizarre, violent, and perverted stories featuring nuns by Dave Sheridan, Robert Crumb, Spain Rodriguez, Jaxon, Roger Brand, and Pat Ryan.

The complete Leather Nun adventures by Dave Sheridan were reprinted in Dave Sheridan: Life with Dealer McDope, The Leather Nun, and The Fabulous Furry Freak Brothers (Fantagraphics Underground, 2018).

== In popular culture ==
Deborah Harry is seen reading the comic in the 1991 movie Intimate Stranger.
