= Dave Sheridan (cartoonist) =

American cartoonist (1943–1982)

- Sheridan in 1975
- Born: June 7, 1943 Cleveland, Ohio, U.S.
- Died: March 28, 1982 (aged 38) San Francisco, California, U.S.
- Areas: Cartoonist, Writer, Penciller
- Pseudonym: Overland Vegetable Stagecoach (with Fred Schrier)
- Notable works: Dealer McDope; Tales from the Leather Nun; The Fabulous Furry Freak Brothers
- Collaborators: Fred Schrier; Gilbert Shelton
- Awards: Inkpot Award, 1978
- Spouse: Dava Stone (m. 1981)
- Children: 1

Dave Sheridan (June 7, 1943 – March 28, 1982) was an American cartoonist and underground comix artist. He was the creator of Dealer McDope and collaborated with Gilbert Shelton and Paul Mavrides on The Fabulous Furry Freak Brothers. As creative partner with fellow underground creator Fred Schrier, using the name "Overland Vegetable Stagecoach," they worked on Mother's Oats Funnies, published by Rip Off Press from 1970 to 1976.

== Biography ==
Born in 1943 and raised in the Cleveland, Ohio area, Sheridan arrived in San Francisco, California in 1969 after having graduated from the Cleveland Institute of Art and serving time in the military in Ethiopia. In California, he collaborated with fellow midwesterner Fred Schrier as the "Overland Vegetable Stagecoach" on three issues of Mother's Oats Comix, two of Meef Comix, and a one-shot title called The Balloon Vendor, published by Rip Off Press and The Print Mint.

Sheridan was the art editor for three issues of The Rip Off Review of Western Culture in 1972, a magazine published by the Rip Off Press. His solo comix work can be seen in Slow Death, Skull Comix, Hydrogen Bomb and Biochemical Warfare Funnies #1, San Francisco Comic Book #1, Tales from the Leather Nun, Rip Off Comix, and High Times, and in cartoons he made for the Berkeley Barb and Playboy. He also did the art for Weed and Wine, the first mini-album produced by Cleveland area folk singer/songwriter John Bassette, as well as album covers for Carl Oglesby, John Lee Hooker, David Steinberg, and Impulse! Records.The "Black Death Malt Liquor" shirt regularly worn by Howard Hesseman on WKRP in Cincinnati in his role as Dr. Johnny Fever was designed and drawn by Sheridan. His illustrations appeared in Ramparts, and he produced a series of cannabis labels for the fictitious California Homegrowers Association (with cartoonist Pat Ryan).

Sheridan eventually settled in San Anselmo, California. There he became a member of the Artista collective, an artist collective with its own jackets and softball team. During the 1972 Major League Baseball strike, he appointed himself the head of the "Scab League", offering to have his team take the strikers' places for $100 per week and all the beer they could drink. He also befriended and worked closely with comedian Don Novello, drawing the album cover for Novello's Father Guido Sarducci Live at St. Douglas Convent comedy album. A characterization of Sarducci appeared in a Dealer McDope adventure, "20,000 Kilos Beneath the Sea" in Mother's Oats #3.

In 1974, Sheridan began collaborating on Gilbert Shelton's The Fabulous Furry Freak Brothers strips. These were syndicated by Rip Off Press to alternative and college weeklies nationwide, and later collected into comix and anthologies. His first issue of The Fabulous Furry Freak Brothers was #4, with a many-page story-arc entitled The Seventh Voyage of the Fabulous Furry Freak Brothers: escaping the landlady and her demands for rent, the hirsute trio go to Mexico where they encounter far worse perils, including a Carlos Castaneda parody. Sheridan's detailed graphic style lent itself well to the fantastic imagery needed to lampoon Castaneda's drug-related Central American-cum-New Age sorcery. He then continued to collaborate on the Freak Brothers comix series through issues 5, 6 and 7; the team was joined by Paul Mavrides in 1978 for issue #6. In all, Sheridan contributed to 45 Freak Brothers tales.

== Death ==
Sheridan was diagnosed with cancer on March 3, 1982, eight months after his July 4, 1981, marriage to Dava Stone. Sheridan died from a brain hemorrhage on March 28, 1982. He had been in a coma for four days at Mt. Zion Hospital in San Francisco. He was buried at sea at a memorial service the following Friday.

His wife Dava gave birth to their daughter Dori on April 4, 1982, a week after Sheridan died.

== Biography ==
A biography — Dave Sheridan: Life with Dealer McDope, the Leather Nun, and the Fabulous Furry Freak Brothers — which reproduces most of his comix and graphics work, was published by Fantagraphics Books in 2018.

== Bibliography ==
=== Overland Vegetable Stagecoach (with Fred Schrier) ===
- Mother's Oats Comix #1 – San Francisco Comic Book Company/Rip Off Press 1969
- Mother's Oats Comix #2 – San Francisco Comic Book Company/Rip Off Press 1970
- Skull Comics #1 (with Greg Irons, Jack Jackson and Rory Hayes) – San Francisco Comic Book Company/Rip Off Press 1970
- The Balloon Vendor – San Francisco Comic Book Company/Rip Off Press 1971
- Meef Comix #1 – San Francisco Comic Book Company/Rip Off Press 1972
- Meef Comix #2 – San Francisco Comic Book Company/Rip Off Press 1973
- Tales of the Leather Nun #1 – Last Gasp Eco Funnies, 1973
- Mindwarp: An Anthology by Sheridan & Schrier — And/Or Press, 1974
- Mother's Oats Comix #3 – San Francisco Comic Book Company/Rip Off Press 1976

=== Other ===
- Slow Death Funnies #1 (with Fred Schrier, Jim Osborne and Gilbert Shelton) – Last Gasp 1970
- Slow Death Funnies #2 "The Sex Evulsors of Tecnicus" – Last Gasp 1970
- The Food Stamp Gourmet by William Brown, Illustrations by Greg Irons, Gilbert Shelton, and Dave Sheridan — Bellerophon Books, 1971.
- The Legion of Charlies by Tom Veitch, Greg Irons, and Dave Sheridan (Paperback) Last Gasp, 1971
- Light Comitragies – Greg Irons — Print Mint 1971
- Skull Comics No.s 2–5 – San Francisco Comic Book Company/Rip Off Press 1971–1972
- Yellow Dog #19 (with Fred Schrier) – The Print Mint 1971
- Fabulous Furry Freak Brothers issues 4, 5, 6 (with Paul Mavrides), and 7
- Jayzey Lynch's Nard n' Pat No. 1 "We Could Get Any Artist ta Draw Us!" (1974)
- U-Comix Sammelband Nr. 1 (Introduction to Paperback) UPN-Volksverlag (1974)
- U-Comix Sammelband Nr. 2 (Introduction to Paperback) UPN-Volksverlag (1975)
- The Seattle Simpleton (vol. 1 No. 3) "The Mellow Cab Man" (Freewheelin' Frank) and "The Story of Phineas and the Organic Mechanic", both by Shelton & Sheridan. Spring 1976.
- Adventures of Fat Freddy's Cat Books 1–3 – with Gilbert Shelton — Rip Off Press, 1977
- Thoroughly Ripped with the Fabulous Furry Freak Brothers and Fat Freddy's Cat! by Shelton and Sheridan — Rip Off Press, 1978
- Rip Off Comix No.s 3–9 Rip-Off Press 1978–1981
- The Best of High Times Comix, vol. 4 (1983) including Dr. McDope in Peru by Siegel & Sheridan, The Fabulous Furry Freak Brothers by Shelton & Sheridan, The Fabulous Furry Freak Brothers and the Mysterious Visitor by Shelton & Sheridan, and "Notorious Norbert" by Fleagle & Fosdick (AKA Shelton & Sheridan)
- Dealer McDope – Rip Off Press, 1985 (part of Underground Classics No. 2-3)
- Time Twisted Tales Rip Off Press, 1986
- The Collected Fat Freddy's Cat. Vol. 1 by Gilbert Shelton & Dave Sheridan — Rip Off Press, 1989.
- The Freak Brothers Bus Line and Other Tales by Gilbert Shelton, Paul Mavrides and Dave Sheridan — Rip Off Press, 1990
- The Collected Fat Freddy's Cat by Gilbert Shelton & Dave Sheridan — Rip Off Press (April 1990) ISBN 0-89620-096-5, ISBN 978-0-89620-096-8
- The Fabulous Furry Freak Brothers Library by Gilbert Shelton, Dave Sheridan, and Paul Mavrides Rip Off Press, Incorporated (March 1995) ISBN 0-89620-094-9, ISBN 978-0-89620-094-4
- Dave Sheridan: Life with Dealer McDope, The Leather Nun, and the Fabulous Furry Freak Brothers, Fantagraphics Underground, Mark Burstein (editor), ISBN 978-1683961208

=== Game ===
- Dealer McDope Dealing Game (Print Mint, 1971)
