= Studio cards =

Type of greeting card

The first studio cards were created in 1946 by Fred Slavic and Rosalind Welcher, seen here in 2002 at their Mount Monadnock home in New Hampshire.

Studio cards were tall, narrow humorous greeting cards which became popular during the 1950s. The approach was sometimes cutting or caustic, a distinct alternative to the type of mild humor previously employed by the major greeting card companies.

Pioneer publishers of studio cards were Rosalind Welcher, Fred Slavic, Nellie Caroll, Bill Kennedy, and Bill Box. These independent card creators eventually found it difficult to compete after Hallmark Cards bought up shopping mall franchises so only Hallmark Cards would be displayed.

== Panda Prints ==
In 1945, when Slavic was in the Merchant Marine, he and Welcher met in New York at a USO dance, and the following year, they became partners in a greeting card business, Panda Prints, with Welcher doing the artwork and Slavic handling the business and manufacturing aspects. They initially silk screened their cards because they were unable to afford a printing press.

Although the tall card shape was already in existence at other companies, Panda Prints injected fresh cartoon humor into that format, and the studio card was born. Soon Welcher was designing 200 cards a year, many in contrast to the saccharin sentiments expressed by established card companies. Her best-selling card combined the song title "Stay as Sweet as You Are" with a happily sloshed woman drinking herself under the table. Some of her greeting cards are in the print collection of the Metropolitan Museum of Art. Although Panda Prints, feeling the Hallmark squeeze, folded in 1977, Slavic and Welcher are still in business, publishing books written and illustrated by Welcher at their West Hill Press in New Hampshire.

== Bop Cards ==
Bill Kennedy (l.) and Bill Box in 1960.

The cartoonist Bill Box first experimented with his 1951 Bop Cards showing hipster figures on Christmas cards. Although Los Angeles gift shops initially showed little interest, sales soared at the USC and UCLA student stores. His cards were tall, explained Box, because he was more comfortable drawing standing figures and because #10 envelopes were the least expensive he could find.

== Box Cards ==
Bill Kennedy and Box met in 1954 when both were working as Los Angeles parking lot attendants. After they launched Box Cards in the mid-1950s with a few California accounts, they attended the New York Stationery Show, where they added more accounts and acquired representatives. The timing was perfect, since Box Cards introduced humor and vitality to the moribund greeting card industry at the same time Harvey Kurtzman's Mad was making a transition from comic book to magazine. College freshmen who had read Mad while in high school were delighted to find their college bookstores giving a prominent display to Box Cards with such lines as: "Now that you're older... go play in the street." Box designed covers for jazz albums by Vic Feldman, Terry Gibbs, Don Fagerquist, George Wallington and the Ex-Hermanites released by the short-lived West Coast recording company, Mode Records. He also published a syndicated comic strip, "That's the Story Of My Life."

== Nellie Caroll and Joel Beck ==
Nellie Caroll drew her Lady Chatter cartoon panel for the Los Angeles Times from May 9, 1965 to November 15, 1965. Kennedy liked what Caroll had produced for her Nellie Card Company, and she became the first artist hired by Box Cards. Another contributor to Box Cards was the cartoonist Joel Beck, credited as one of the founders of the underground comics movement in the mid-1960s. Only a few years before he first published Penthouse in 1965, Bob Guccione drew cartoons for Box Cards. Other cartoonists who drew Box Cards were Harry Crane, Jerry Lee and Bill Brewer, who had a long career with Hallmark and won the National Cartoonists Society Greeting Cards Award in 2000.

The success of Box Cards did not go unnoticed by the major greeting card companies, and by 1957, Hallmark, American Greetings, Rust Craft, Norcross and Gibson Greetings all were publishing studio cards. In the decades that followed, humorous cards evolved through many different approaches at the major companies and came full circle in 1993 when Gibson made a licensing agreement with Mad to publish a 1994 line of Mad greeting cards with artwork by the Mad cartoonists.

== Beatniks ==
Hallmark labeled their early 1950s line Fancy Free, and American Greetings called theirs Hi Brows. In its official history, American Greetings acknowledges Hi Brows were published in 1957 because the earlier studio cards were a cartooning breakthrough:

Beatniks launched the anti-establishment movement in the 1950s, and Americans began to question tradition. Building on this counterculture momentum, American Greetings introduced a new kind of greeting card - Hi Brows. These irreverent, witty cards were slim and tall. Even the name of the cards was a rebellious parody. The inspiration for Hi Brows came from funny cards being made by Bohemian artists in their Greenwich Village studios. Hi Brows featured short, comic punch lines and cartoon-style artwork, a new generation of greeting cards to help a new generation communicate.

A 1950s Box Card by Bill Box

In 1960, Box Cards were collected into a book, Burn This, with an introduction by Mort Sahl, who wrote:

My initial exposure to the new awareness cards, as I shall refer to them, was not in the area of shock, because I recognized them for what they were. This is a cliché but they were a sign of the times. This isn't so much the beat generation, as Alfred Bester has pointed out, as the hip generation. The greatest disservice we can do ourselves is not to be aware of our times and how things are changing. Now the things we dared not say in the old days, especially when we observed the saccharine reverence of unworthy institutions, has gone the other way. It's gone full circle. People now state their hostility, or if they're much too busy being caught up in the squirrel cage, they let the Box Cards state their hostility for them. This is not to say that I think the work of Bill Box is merely a statement of hostility or anything sick.

With the major card companies taking over, Box looked elsewhere. Leaving the card business, he had a successful career as a comedy writer for top talents, including Jonathan Winters, Steve Allen, Phyllis Diller and George Gobel. His work for television included gagwriting for several Dean Martin Roasts. Box retired in 1985 but occasionally contributes to Duck Press ("America's Golf Greeting Card Company") in Tucson.

== Bernad Creations ==
In 1954, Bernad Creations published Herb Gardner's characters, The Nebbishes, on greeting cards, posters and figurines. The most famous of these showed two slacker Nebbishes relaxing with feet on a table and the line, "Next week we've got to get organized!" First a greeting card and then a poster, it was so popular that the gagline became a national catch phrase. In 1959-60, Gardner did The Nebbishes as a syndicated comic strip, and his autobiographical novel, A Piece of the Action (1958), has a thinly disguised recounting of the creation and marketing of his characters.

Bernad Creations also published cards by The New Yorker cartoonist William Steig. His "People are no damn good!" card earned him $250,000 in royalties.

== Other companies ==
Other studio card publishers in the mid-1950s included:

- Carol Cards
- Country Cousin
- De Mael
- Dolphin Designs
- Jane Jarvis
- Jolie Cards
- Mantice Greetings
- Red Farm Studio
- Saya Studio
- Tessier Studio
- Vasari, Inc.
