= DiCaprio (disambiguation) =

Leonardo DiCaprio (born 1974) is an American actor.

DiCaprio may also refer to:

- Dicaprio Bootle, American football cornerback
- George DiCaprio (born 1943), American writer

== See also ==
- DiCaprio 2, a 2018 album by JID
