= Rand Holmes =

Canadian artist and illustrator

- Panel showing Harold Hedd, Rand Holmes' most well-known creation
- Born: February 22, 1942 Truro, Nova Scotia
- Died: March 15, 2002 (aged 60) Nanaimo, British Columbia
- Area: Cartoonist
- Notable works: Harold Hedd
- Awards: Canadian Cartoonist Hall of Fame; Joe Shuster Hall of Fame

Randolph Holton Holmes (February 22, 1942 – March 15, 2002) was a Canadian artist and illustrator probably best known for his work in underground comix. His work was of a higher level of quality than was seen elsewhere in the field, and is considered comparable to such creations as Gilbert Shelton's The Fabulous Furry Freak Brothers and Robert Crumb's Mr. Natural.

Born in Truro, Nova Scotia, he grew up in Edmonton, Alberta. As a teenager Holmes taught himself to draw by copying comic-strip artists Wally Wood and Will Eisner. Harvey Kurtzman later published two of his drawings in Help! He married young and worked briefly as a sign painter.

== Career in underground comix ==
=== Georgia Straight ===
Holmes moved to Vancouver in 1969 and found work as an illustrator at The Georgia Straight, a weekly underground tabloid. The Straight's publisher, Dan McLeod, would later say of him:

Here was one of the greatest artists in the history of underground comics, living in our building and churning out major satirical work about those who were out to destroy us, turning them into buffoons. He was a sweet, gentle man who helped us to seize the moral high ground when we were feeling beaten.

=== Harold Hedd ===
The Harold Hedd strip lampooned other contemporary personalities, such as Prime Minister Pierre Trudeau and Minister of Finance Edgar Benson.

He drew numerous covers for the Straight and created the Harold Hedd comic strip, which ran in the paper as well as in other publications such as The Body Politic, during the early 1970s. Described by writer Dana Larsen as Holmes's "most well known cartoon creation", the one-page strip was collected in two volumes:

- The Collected Adventures of Harold Hedd (1972) Georgia Straight (1st edition), with a 2nd edition in 1973 by Last Gasp, Berkeley, oversized, 36 p.
- Anus Clenching Adventures with Harold Hedd (1973), Last Gasp, 36 p.
- Harold Hedd: Hitler's Cocaine was Holmes's longest published story (in two issues of 26 and 30 p.), published by Kitchen Sink in 1984. It received notable success among European readers.

=== Other works ===
Holmes's work appeared in various underground comics titles:

- White Lunch Comix #1 (1972, Georgia Straight)
- All Canadian Beaver Comics #1 (1973, Georgia Straight)
- Slow Death #5 (1973, Last Gasp), #6 (1974)
- Fog City Comics #1 (1977), #2 (1978), #3 (1979, Stampart)
- Snarf #11 (1986, Kitchen Sink)

He provided the cover for the debut issue of Gay Comix (1980, Kitchen Sink), and illustrated three horror story scripts for Pacific Comics: Twisted Tales #2, #5 (1983) and Alien Worlds #8 (1984).

== Later life ==
In 1982, Holmes and his second wife Martha left Vancouver and moved to Lasqueti Island. In his last years he concentrated on his meticulous surrealistic oil painting. His reference library included works by René Magritte, Robert Williams, Pablo Picasso and Gilbert Shelton.

Holmes died at Nanaimo, BC, undergoing chemotherapy treatment for Hodgkin's lymphoma.

In 2007, Holmes was inducted into the Giants of the North, and a retrospective of his work was presented at that time at his Gulf Island home. A further exhibition was held in Vancouver in 2011.
