= Yellow Dog (comics) =

Comic newspaper

- The cover to Yellow Dog 1 (May 1968), featuring an illustration by Robert Crumb.

Publication information
- Publisher: Print Mint
- Schedule: weekly, then biannually
- Format: Ongoing series
- Genre: Underground comix
- Publication date: May 1968 – Fall 1973
- No. of issues: 22

Creative team
- Artist(s): Joel Beck, Robert Crumb, Rick Griffin, S. Clay Wilson, Kim Deitch, Gilbert Shelton, Victor Moscoso, Robert Williams, Jay Lynch, Vaughn Bodē, Justin Green, Trina Robbins, Larry Welz, Skip Williamson, Greg Irons, Harvey Kurtzman, George Metzger, Roger Brand, Joel Beck, Bill Griffith, Fred Schrier, Dave Sheridan, Carl Lundgren, Robert Armstrong
- Editor: Don Schencker

Yellow Dog was an underground comix newspaper and later comic book published by the Print Mint in Berkeley, California. It published 22 issues from 1968 to 1973, featuring many of the period's most notable underground cartoonists, including Robert Crumb, Joel Beck, Robert Williams, Rick Griffin, Greg Irons, and Trina Robbins. Other frequent contributors included Andy Martin, Franz Cilensek, John Thompson, Buckwheat Florida, Jr., Jim Osborne, Ronald Lipking, and Hak Vogrin. The founding editor was Print Mint co-publisher Don Schencker.

Yellow Dog has the distinction of having published more issues than any other true underground comix publication.

== Origins ==
There is some disagreement about the impetus for Yellow Dog. Print Mint publisher/editor Don Schencker claims he came up with the idea, wanting to create an underground comix version of the old comics section of the Sunday newspaper. Cartoonist John Thompson claims that he and Joel Beck came up with the idea of a comix newspaper with the title "Puck the Yellow Kid" (a reference to Richard F. Outcault's' pioneering comics strip character The Yellow Kid). Thompson states that after some coaxing by the artists, Schencker agreed to publish the newspaper, but changed the name to Yellow Dog.

== Publication history ==
Yellow Dog started out as a tabloid-size fold-out newsprint broadsheet with black-and-white interiors featuring some yellow spot color. The first issue, published in May 1968, had eight pages, while issues #2–8 had 16 pages each. From issue #9–10 onward, Yellow Dog had at least 32 pages, most commonly running 44 pages long. With issue #13/#14 (July 1969), Yellow Dog switched format from a newspaper broadsheet to standard comic book size and format, with color covers and black-and-white interiors.

The first volume of Yellow Dog included seven issues, all published "as weekly as possible" in 1968. Vol. 2 began with issue #8 in 1969; eight issues were published that year, but three of those issues (#9/#10, #11/#12, and #13/#14) were double issues. Yellow Dog published two issues in 1970, two issues in 1971, three issues in 1972, and two issues in 1973. Yellow Dog ceased publishing after 22 issues, numbered 1-25 because of the three double issues.

The first twelve issues of Yellow Dog were reprinted in 1973 as a fifth anniversary edition, and sold together in a manila envelope.

== Overview ==
The "mascot" of the yellow dog — featured on almost all the covers — was intended to be a sort of underground analogue to Mad magazine's Alfred E. Neuman. The dog appeared on the cover of the first few 11 issues, portrayed as urinating on the leg of Captain Ahab from Moby-Dick. From issue #11 onward, the dog appeared in various places, sometimes part of the actual cover art, although it did not appear at all on issues #15, 18, and 19.

The first few issues of Yellow Dog offered little beyond drug-influenced vignettes, scatological humor, and some work by Robert Crumb. Crumb illustrated many covers for issues #1–13/14 (July 1969), which was the last issue to which he contributed. Highlights from issues #7–12 included Gilbert Shelton's Fabulous Furry Freak Brothers, Crumb's Mr. Natural, and strong contributions from Kim Deitch, and Skip Williamson. Issue #7 featured the first underground published work from Robert Williams.

The first comic-sized issue (#13/14, published in July 1969) featured contributions from Crumb, Greg Irons, Jim Osborne, Larry Welz, Jay Lynch, Hak Vogrin, Kay Rudin, and S. Clay Wilson. As time passed, Yellow Dog became a showcase of sorts for new talent in the underground field, giving a forum to voices like Greg Irons, Justin Green, Trina Robbins, Bill Griffith, Robert Armstrong, and Howard Cruse.

== Issues guide ==
=== Volume 1 ===
#	Date	Cover artist	Contributors	Notes
1	May 1968	Robert Crumb	Joel Beck, Franz Cilensek, Robert Crumb, Phil Gardner, Andy Martin, G. Ratten, John Thompson	
2	June 1968	Robert Crumb	Joel Beck, Franz Cilensek, Robert Crumb, Phil Gardner, Rick Griffin, Andy Martin, Victor Moscoso, John Thompson, Ron White	
3	June 1968	Ron White	Joel Beck, Robert Crumb, Andy Martin, John Thompson, Ron White, S. Clay Wilson	
4	July 1968	Robert Crumb	Joel Beck, Franz Cilensek, Robert Crumb, Steve Hayden, Andy Martin, John Thompson, Peter Webster, Ron White, S. Clay Wilson	
5	July 24, 1968	Andy Martin	S. Brunswick, Franz Cilensek, Robert Crumb, Kim Deitch, Dave Gilson, Andy Martin, Chuck McNaughton, Jim Osborne, John Thompson, Chas White, Ron White, S. Clay Wilson, Charles Winans	
6	July 1968	Robert Crumb	Robert Crumb, Buckwheat Florida Jr., Andy Martin, Jim Osborne, Gilbert Shelton, John Thompson, Peter Webster, Ron White, S. Clay Wilson	
7	December 1968	Victor Moscoso	Joel Beck, Tom P. Cosparcito, Robert Crumb, Buckwheat Florida Jr., Victor Moscoso, Don Schenker, Gilbert Shelton, Robert Williams, S. Clay Wilson	

=== Volume 2 ===
#	Date	Cover artist	Contributors	Notes
8	early 1969	Robert Williams	Joel Beck, Robert Crumb, Buckwheat Florida Jr., Jon Gierlich, Rick Griffin, Andy Martin, Gilbert Shelton, Hak Vorging, Robert Williams, S. Clay Wilson	
9/10	April 1969	Robert Crumb	Peter Almasy, Robert Crumb, Kim Deitch, Buckwheat Florida Jr., Don Grant, Jay Lynch, Dave Manning, Andy Martin, Jim Osborne, Kent Perry, Kay Rudin, Bob Schnepf, Gilbert Shelton, John Thompson, Hak Vogrin, Robert Williams, S. Clay Wilson	Double-issue; Kay Rudin becomes Yellow Dog's first female contributor.
11/12	May 1969	Skip Williamson	Peter Almasy, Joel Beck, Vaughn Bodē, Robert Crumb, Buckwheat Florida Jr., Justin Green, Ronald Lipking, Andy Martin, Jim Osborne, Kent Perry, Trina Robbins, Kay Rudin, Don Schenker, John Thompson, Hak Vogrin, Larry Welz, Skip Williamson, S. Clay Wilson	Double-issue
13/14	July 1969	Robert Crumb	Greg Irons, Jim Osborne, Robert Crumb, Ronald Lipking, Larry Welz, Richard Carse, Jay Lynch, Hak Vogrin, Gill Smitherman, Kay Rudin, S. Clay Wilson, Andy Martin, Peter Almasy	Double-issue; switches format from tabloid to comics magazine.
15	Fall 1969	Greg Irons	Rob Brown, Dan Clyne, Robert Dougherty, Renaud Facade, J. Gaccione, Jim Gardner, Justin Green, Greg Irons, Harvey Kurtzman, Ronald Lipking, Jay Lynch, Ed Newton, Hak Vogrin, Larry Welz	Special Harvey Kurtzman tribute issue, including a reprint of Kurtzman's 1959 12-page story "Compulsion on the Range".
16	Fall 1969	Patrick Cosgrove	Joel Beck, Patrick Cosgrove, Fred Schrier, Hak Vogrin, Kincaid, Tripp Pollard, Ronald Lipking, John Thompson, Dan Clyne, Jim Gardner, J. Gaccione, Wink, Robert Dougherty	
17	March 1970	Larry Welz	Robert Dougherty, Larry Welz, George Metzger, Rick Shubb, Ronald Lipking, Greg Irons, Assid Mic, J. Gaccione, Justin Green, Gill Smitherson, Trina Robbins	
18	November 1970	Greg Irons	Greg Irons, Jim Evans, Jim Gardner, Patrick Cosgrove, Larry Welz, Roger Brand, Joel Beck, Bill Griffith, J. Freeman, J. Gaccione, John Thompson	
19	March 1971	Roger Brand	Greg Irons, Roger Brand, Justin Green, Fred Schrier, J. Gaccione, Bill Griffith, David Webster, Claude Bawls, Trina Robbins, Dave Sheridan, Luis Medina	
20	July 1971	Trina Robbins	Joe Roberts, Trina Robbins, Mervinius, Larry Rippee, Norman Quebedeau, Bill Griffith, Bob Riggs, Jim Gardner, D. Wood, David Webster, Greg Irons	
21	January 1972	Carl Lundgren	R. W. B., Joray, Tom Bird, Justin Green, Rebb C. King, Carl Lundgren, George Metzger, Hak Vogrin	
22	1972	Greg Irons	Joel Beck, Mervinius, Justin Green, Greg Irons, Rebb C. King, Michael McMillan, Joe Roberts, Pat Ryan, Craig A. Stormon	
23	October 1972	Jim Evans	Robert Armstrong, Jim Evans, Willy Mendes, Marty Nelson, Chris Pelletiere, Trina Robbins, Carl Spann, D. Wood	
24	March 1973	Joe Roberts	Tim Boxell, Howard Cruse, Mervinius, Joe Roberts, Pat Ryan, R. Tomasic, D. Wood	
25	Fall 1973	Trina Robbins	Joel Beck, Leslie Cabarga, Robert Cavey, Patrick Cosgrove, Dave Hereth, Rick Pflug, Trina Robbins, Joe Roberts	

== See also ==
- Gothic Blimp Works
