= Paul Mavrides =

American artist (born 1952)

- Born: 1952 (age 73–74)
- Areas: Posters, Comics
- Notable works: The Fabulous Furry Freak Brothers
- Collaborators: Jay Kinney, Gilbert Shelton, Harvey Pekar

Paul Mavrides (born 1952) is an American artist, best known for his critique-laden comics, cartoons, paintings, graphics, performances and writings that encompass a disturbing yet humorous catalog of the social ills and shortcomings of human civilization. Mavrides worked with underground comix pioneer Gilbert Shelton on The Fabulous Furry Freak Brothers from 1978 to 1992. Mavrides has been noted for "adding new dimensions to the political comic" in the underground comix press of the 1970s and '80s.

Mavrides is a founding member of the Church of the SubGenius, having been a member of the organization since its earliest days. He is a co-author of Revelation X: The "Bob" Apocryphon: Hidden Teachings and Deuterocanonical Texts of J.R. "Bob" Dobbs (Fireside Books, 1994).

== Career ==
Mavrides came to the San Francisco Bay Area in 1975, and was soon working with San Francisco-based comics creator Jay Kinney on "Cover-Up Lowdown", originally a weekly panel cartoon which was collected and published by Rip Off Press in November 1977. This strip satirized political cover-ups of the day, as well as those of recent history, such as the assassination of John F. Kennedy. Kinney and Mavrides then collaborated on the political anthology Anarchy Comics, which was published sporadically by Last Gasp between 1978 and 1987. Mavrides contributed comics to all four issues of Anarchy Comics as well as editing the final issue.

Mavrides illustrated several stories for Harvey Pekar in American Splendor. He also had work in such alternative comics titles as Young Lust (Last Gasp), Real War Stories (Eclipse Comics), and the Brought to Light trade paperback (Eclipse).

Mavrides was credited as art director for Grass, a 1999 documentary on marijuana. He designed the record jacket for The Nuclear Beauty Parlor. Mavrides is also a collagist, photographer and painter.

=== The Fabulous Furry Freak Brothers ===
In 1978, Mavrides joined Gilbert Shelton and Dave Sheridan to co-produce Fabulous Furry Freak Brothers comics stories. Together, with Shelton and Mavrides writing, and Mavrides, Sheridan, and Shelton producing the artwork, the three of them produced the comix that were later collected into Freak Brothers issues #6 & 7.

Following Sheridan's death from complications of cancer in 1982, Mavrides became Shelton's steady partner in all further Freak Brothers material. The two of them embarked on an ambitious project (begun in 1982 and serialized in issues #11 and 12 of the Rip Off Comix series, but not published in the comics series The Fabulous Furry Freak Brothers until 1984): a full color, three-volume story arc entitled "The Fabulous Furry Freak Brothers in The Idiots Abroad". In 1984, Shelton, who had spent parts of 1980 and 1981 in Europe, moved back to Europe for good and the Freak Brothers collaboration became a trans-Atlantic affair. The last full issue of new Freak Brothers material came out in 1992.

== Legal battles ==
In 1991, Mavrides protested against a resolution by the State of California to levy a sales tax on comic strips and comic books. He challenged the law in court, with assistance from the Comic Book Legal Defense Fund, arguing that the comic strip is a communications medium that should be classed with books, magazines, and newspapers (which are not subject to sales taxes due to First Amendment provisions). In 1997, a ruling in Mavrides' favor was handed down by the California State Board of Equalization.

== Depictions in other media ==
Science fiction author and mathematician Rudy Rucker created the character Corey Rhizome based on Mavrides. Rhizome features in the novel Freeware as a creator of semi-sentient toys, many of which have deviant or anti-social personality traits based on Rhizome's personality. Rhizome, whom Rucker described as "Mavrides as evil toymaker", is a profligate user of moon grown hybrid marijuana that he smokes via complex vaping hardware.
