= Charlie Schlingo =

French cartoonist and illustrator

- Born: Jean-Charles Ninduab; August 3, 1955 France
- Died: June 17, 2005 (aged 49) Paris, France

Jean-Charles Ninduab (1955–2005), known by his pen name Charlie Schlingo, was a French comics artist and illustrator.

Schlingo was a contributor to Comix 2000, published by L'Association.

He died at age 49 as the result of a fall.

Schlingo's biography, Je voudrais me suicider mais j'ai pas le temps, by Jean Teulé and Florence Cestac, was published by Dargaud in 2009. Since 2009, the Angoulême International Comics Festival has awarded the Schlingo Prize.
