= Paul Ollswang =

American cartoonist

- Born: Paul Andrew Ollswang; 1945
- Died: 1996 (aged 50–51) Monroe, Oregon
- Areas: Cartoonist; Writer; Musician
- Pseudonym: Paul Ollswang
- Notable works: Dreams of a Dog; Tom O' Bedlam; Rube and Slocni; Doofer: Pathway to McEarth; Unfolding of a teahouse

Paul Ollswang was an American underground cartoonist, writer, organizer, radio host, and musician, whose primary working years were spent in Eugene, Oregon.

== Bibliography ==
=== Comics ===
- Dreams of a Dog
- Doofer: Pathway to McEarth

=== Books ===
- The Song of Tom O'Bedlam, 1977

=== Comic publications ===
- Centrifugal Bumble-puppy
- Graphic Story Monthly
- The Comics Journal

=== Magazines and Newspapers ===
- Oregon Cycling
- Comic News
- Willamette Valley Observer
- Rain Magazine
