= Greg Irons =

American artist

- Born: Gregory Rodman Irons; September 29, 1947 Philadelphia, Pennsylvania, U.S.
- Died: November 14, 1984 (aged 37) Bangkok, Thailand
- Areas: Poster artist, underground cartoonist, animator, tattoo artist
- Notable works: Slow Death
- Collaborators: Tom Veitch

Greg Irons (September 29, 1947 – November 14, 1984) was an American poster artist, underground cartoonist, animator and tattoo artist.

== Biography ==
Irons was born in Philadelphia, Pennsylvania. He moved to San Francisco, California, in 1967, where he soon found work designing posters for Bill Graham at The Fillmore Auditorium.

He worked on the film Yellow Submarine, then returned to work for Graham Productions. He soon branched out into album covers and "comix" work for the Print Mint, Last Gasp Eco-Funnies, and other local underground publishers. Irons' collaborations with writer Tom Veitch in the early 1970s (the creative team was known as "GI/TV") included Deviant Slice Funnies, Legion of Charlies. Other contributions to underground comics included Skull Comix and Slow Death. A solo comic entitled Light Comitragies was published in June 1971 by the Print Mint.

In the mid-1970s he began book illustration work, mainly for Bellerophon Books. One of these was a coloring-book format illustration of Chaucer's "The Wife of Bath's Prologue and Tale" which was issued with "The Miller's Tale" illustrated by Gilbert Shelton. In 1979, he illustrated The Official Advanced Dungeons & Dragons Coloring Album which was both a coloring book and a short adventure module authored by Gary Gygax. It was also around this time he began doing tattooing.

On November 14, 1984, while on a working vacation in Bangkok, Thailand, Irons was struck and killed by a bus.

The August 1985 issue of Swamp Thing, vol. 2, issue #39, written by Alan Moore, is dedicated to Greg Irons.
