= Guy Colwell =

American painter

- Born: March 28, 1945 (age 81); Oakland, California, U.S.
- Education: California College of Arts and Crafts
- Known for: Painting, comic book artist, cartoonist
- Notable work: Inner City Romance
- Website: www.atelier9.com

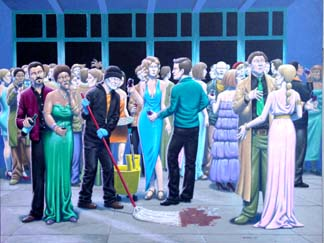
Reception, a painting by Guy Colwell.

Guy Colwell (born March 28, 1945) is an American painter and occasional underground cartoonist. Although not African-American himself, Colwell's comics often portray black people in strong roles in stories of life on the streets. His "Figurative Social Surrealist" paintings reflect on the human condition, economic inequality, injustice, and alienation from the natural world.

== Biography ==
Guy Colwell was on born March 28, 1945, in Oakland, California. Colwell studied art at the California College of Arts and Crafts (now California College of the Arts). After completing two years there, he dropped out to travel and gain life and work experience.

After working an almost two-year stint as a sculptor for Mattel, and as he was preparing his return to college, he was arrested for draft refusal and sentenced to two years in federal prison at McNeil Island Corrections Center, in Washington state. His experiences there and the period after his release were the genesis of his underground comix series Inner City Romance, published by Last Gasp beginning in 1972. He was financially unable to continue art school as planned, but was deeply committed to painting as his life's work, so he was mainly self-taught thereafter.

During the turbulent 1970s scene in San Francisco, Colwell worked as an illustrator for the underground paper Good Times and joined the commune that produced this weekly.

Colwell left the Good Times after the paper ceased publication and concentrated on doing paintings and a few comic books until the mid-1980s. After this creative period which was marred by drug abuse, Colwell worked for Rip Off Press as a colorist, where he contributed stories, artwork, or production to many underground comic book titles and anthologies. He authored a second comic book series under the title Doll and completely stopped using drugs and alcohol while working at Rip Off Press.

In 1986, upon hearing of The Great Peace March for Global Nuclear Disarmament, Colwell took an 18-month leave of absence from Rip Off Press to join what was touted by original Great Peace March organizer David Mixner as a major event in American history. While on the GPM, Colwell helped draw route maps for the marchers as well as creating art depicting marchers in their everyday lives. His route maps and drawings are part of the Swarthmore College Peace Collection.

On returning to Rip Off Press, by 1988, he relocated to Auburn, California, Colwell became strongly influenced by the natural beauty and wildlife of the Sierra Mountains. Nature and animal subject matter would thereafter become much more prominent in his work and inspired a deeper exploration of surrealism. His artwork today is internationally recognized for its social commentary. The images he renders have received praise from art critics, and have been sought after by collectors.

His 2004 painting, The Abuse, is his depiction of the prisoner abuse at Abu Ghraib prison in Iraq. This being Colwell's most controversial work, Lori Haigh, the owner of the San Francisco gallery where it was exhibited received death threats and was physically attacked. Her gallery also received damage from unknown persons, causing it to close permanently.

Examples of Colwell's original works can be seen at the Crocker Art Museum in Sacramento, California, and the Pritikin Museum in San Francisco, which features his magnum opus, Litter Beach. In September 2012, Colwell's work was featured in Juxtapoz magazine. New small works and comic page originals can be seen on the Heritage Auctions website as well as Colwell's own site.

== Personal life ==
Colwell is married and lives in Berkeley, California, where he devotes himself to creating personal and political art.

== Bibliography ==
- Inner City Romance (Last Gasp, 5-issue series, 1972–1978)
- Doll (Rip Off Press, 8-issue series, 1989–1992)
- The Further Adventures of Doll (Kitchen Sink Press, 1989)
- Central Body: The Art of Guy Colwell (Rip Off Press, 1991) — collection of his art between the years 1964-1991
- In Fox's Forest (Fantagraphics, 2016)
- Delights: A Story of Hieronymus Bosch (Fantagraphics, 2025)
