= George DiCaprio =

American comic book author and actor (born 1943)

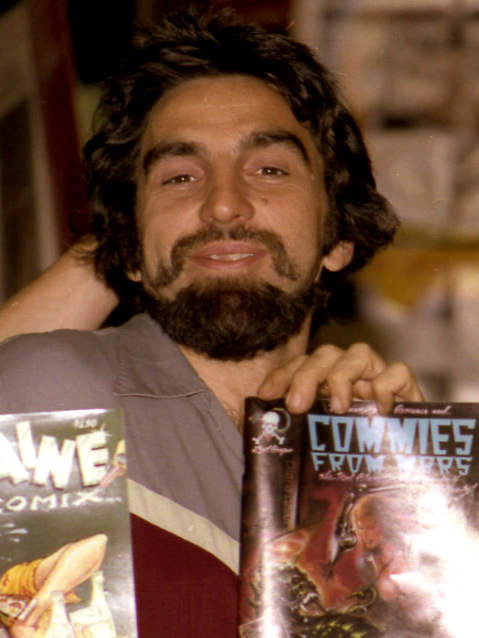
- DiCaprio in 1982
- Born: George Paul DiCaprio; October 2, 1943 (age 83); New York City, U.S.
- Spouses: Irmelin Indenbirken (m. 1964; div. 1975); Peggy Farrar (m. 1995)
- Children: Leonardo DiCaprio

George Paul DiCaprio (born October 2, 1943) is an American comic book author and actor who has collaborated with Timothy Leary and Laurie Anderson. He is the father of actor Leonardo DiCaprio.

== Early life ==
DiCaprio was born George Paul DiCaprio on October 2, 1943, in New York City to George Leon DiCaprio (1902–1965) and Olga Anne Jacobs (1904–1984). His father was the son of Italian immigrants, Salvatore DiCaprio (1866–1966) and Rosina Cassella (1875–1941), and his mother was of German descent.

== Career ==
DiCaprio was active in underground comix throughout the 1970s, as a writer, editor, publisher, and distributor. He is known for such titles as Greaser Comics, Forbidden Knowledge, and Cocaine Comix, collaborating with artists such as Laurie Anderson, Pete von Sholly, and Rich Chidlaw.

DiCaprio's first foray into comix came in 1970 with Baloney Moccasins Comics: A Magazine for the Medieval Mind, a politically themed one-shot densely illustrated by Laurie Anderson. The book was released by DiCaprio's short-lived self-publishing imprint (in partnership with R. Jaccoma), Half-Ass Press. (DiCaprio and Jaccoma had been part of a New York City-based firm known as Cloud Studios.)

In 1979, Last Gasp published the one-shot comic Neurocomics: Timothy Leary. "Evolved from transmissions of Dr. Timothy Leary as filtered through Pete Von Sholly & George DiCaprio", "Neurocomics was written by DiCaprio based on Timothy Leary's extensive ruminations on" life, the brain, and intelligence. As M. Steven Fox of Comix Joint wrote of the project, "though a 32-page book cannot possibly convey the full complexity of an elaborate concept like the eight-circuit model of consciousness, Neurocomics provides a concise primer on the subject."

As a distributor in the 1970s and 1980s, DiCaprio supplied West Coast retailers with underground and independent comics.

DiCaprio was also a performance artist. Comics writer Harvey Pekar details a performance in Los Angeles in February 1988 where DiCaprio claimed that he did "a light show using brine shrimp and worms. I'd hit 'em with cold water and they'd move around and I'd project 'em on a wall magnified. It blew people's minds."

DiCaprio played an important role in his son's early career as an actor. He used to screen scripts for him, and was instrumental in getting Leo to portray Arthur Rimbaud in the 1995 film Total Eclipse.

Since 2008, DiCaprio has worked as an executive producer in the film industry, mainly for documentaries and short films; one of his first assignments was as a co-executive producer of the TV series Greensburg.

In 2021, he made his film acting debut, portraying Mr. Jack in Paul Thomas Anderson's film Licorice Pizza.

== Personal life ==
DiCaprio met Irmelin Indenbirken (born 1945), a German immigrant, in college; the two later married and moved to Los Angeles. The couple had one son, Leonardo DiCaprio, and divorced shortly after, when Leonardo was a year old, so DiCaprio could begin a relationship with another woman named Peggy Farrar. He has a stepson, Adam Farrar, through his marriage to Peggy Farrar. While Leonardo lived mostly with his mother, his parents agreed to live next door to each other so as not to deprive him of his father's presence in his life. His son credits him for providing motivation and guidance on filmmaking.

DiCaprio expressed an interest in pursuing politics in July 2025.

== Comics ==
=== Publisher ===
- Baloney Moccasins Comics: A Magazine for the Medieval Mind (Half-Ass Press, 1970) — also writer
- Greaser Comics #1 (Half-Ass Press, Sept. 1971; series continued by Rip Off Press) — also writer
- Yama Yama/The Ugly Head (1981) – flip book made in response to the work of Gary Panter and the burgeoning punk art scene; Robert Williams illustrated "Yama Yama" while S. Clay Wilson illustrated "The Ugly Head"
- Hoo-Bee-Boo #1 (1982) — features the work of Rick Potts, Christopher Lissner, Tit & Tat, James Cotner, RxCx, Eddii Ruscha, Tomata du Plenty, Kent Moorman, Vincent-Michael Edwards, and the Fuk Boys (Gary Panter and Matt Groening); edited by Will Amato

=== Editor ===
- Baloney Moccasins Comics: A Magazine for the Medieval Mind (Half-Ass Press, 1970)
- Greaser Comics #1–2 (Half-Ass Press, Sept. 1971; Rip Off Press, July 1972)
- Forbidden Knowledge #1–2 (Last Gasp, 1975, 1978) – edited by DiCaprio & Pete von Sholly, with contributions from Robert Williams, Rich Chidlaw, Matt Golden, Brent Boates, Art Vitello, Milt Gray, Jean Paul Laurens, Jim Himes, Icelandic Codpiece Comics Studio, Dennis Ellis, Chris Lane, Warren Greenwood, Doug Hansen, Pete Von X (a.k.a. Pete von Sholly), and Johnny Edgar
- Bicentennial Gross-Outs #1 (Yentzer and Gonif, July 1976) — co-edited with William Stout
- Cocaine Comix #1-4 (Last Gasp, 1976–1982) – co-edited with Rich Chidlaw

=== Writer ===
As writer unless otherwise indicated

- Baloney Moccasins Comics: A Magazine for the Medieval Mind (Half-Ass Press, 1970) — wrote entire issue; illustrated by Laurie Anderson
- "Don't Bite the Bullit!", "El Hypno-Bandito," "Great Moments of the 50's," "Great Balls of Fire!", and "Sexism is Out!", Greaser Comics #1 (Half-Ass Press, Sept. 1971) – stories and art; inks by R. Jaccoma
- Greaser Comics #2 (Rip Off Press, July 1972) – wrote entire issue; stories illustrated by Jim Janes
- "On The Road to Babylon" (art by Rich Chidlaw), Pure Joy Comix #1 (Icelandic Codpiece Comic Studio, Aug. 1975)
- "Computer Date" (art by Jay Kinney), Snarf #6 (Feb. 1976)
  - Translated and republished in El Víbora #39 (Ediciones La Cúpula, Feb. 1983)
- "Anthony and the Temptations" (art by Justin Green), Arcade: The Comics Revue #5 (Print Mint, Spring 1976)
- "Roscoe Pitts - The Man who Changed his Fingerprints!!" (art by Warren Greenwood), Bicentennial Gross-Outs #1 (Yentzer and Gonif, July 1976)
- "Great American Assassins: Dr. Frank Holt" (art by Jim Serpiello), Bicentennial Gross-Outs #1 (Yentzer and Gonif, July 1976)
- "Wildroot: A Year Passes Like Nothing When You Spend Spring On The Floor Part One," "Wildroot: Part Two: House Of Divino," "Wildroot: Godzilla vs. the Cocaine Monster!!", and "Wildroot: Shoot-out at the Hollywood Ranch Market" (all art by Rich Chidlaw), Cocaine Comix #1 (Last Gasp, Feb. 1976)
- "Atomic Follies" with Pete von Sholly and Quinn (art by Warren Greenwood), Forbidden Knowledge #2 (Last Gasp, [July] 1978)
- "The Man They Couldn't Hang!" (art by Warren Greenwood), Forbidden Knowledge #2 (Last Gasp, [July] 1978)
- "Dr. Leary's Evolutionary Deli" and "S.M.I².L.E." with Timothy Leary, Tim Kummero, and Pete von Sholly; illustrated by Pete Von Sholly, Neurocomics (Last Gasp, 1979)
- "The Asbestos Workers' Revenge!!" (art by Warren Greenwood), Slow Death #10 (Last Gasp, Nov 1979)
- "Wildroot: Night of the Nearly Dead" (art by Rich Chidlaw), Cocaine Comix #2 (Last Gasp, 1980)
- "Taste the Base of Nostrilachoo!" (story by Rich Chidlaw), Cocaine Comix #3 (Last Gasp, 1981) — art by DiCaprio
  - Translated and republished in U-Comix #54 (Kunst der Comics / Alpha, 1985)
- "Citizen Caine" (art by Rich Chidlaw), Cocaine Comix #4 (Last Gasp, 1982)
