= Joel Beck =

American cartoonist (1943–1999)

- Born: May 7, 1943 Ross, California, U.S.
- Died: September 14, 1999 (aged 56) Point Richmond, California, U.S.
- Areas: Cartoonist, Artist
- Notable works: Lenny of Laredo

Joel Beck (May 7, 1943 – September 14, 1999) was a San Francisco Bay Area artist and cartoonist. His comic book Lenny of Laredo, one of the earliest underground comic books of the 1960s, was the first underground comic book published on the West Coast.

== Biography ==
=== Early life ===
Born in Ross, California, Beck grew up in El Sobrante, California, as an ill and bedridden child, who battled a combination of tuberculosis and spinal meningitis. In Richmond, California, while attending De Anza High School, he began a lifelong friendship with the cartoonist Roger Brand. Visiting UC Berkeley, he started submitting cartoons to the campus humor magazine, The Pelican, slipping them under the door to editors who believed he was a college student. Soon he dropped out of high school and never graduated. In the early 1960s, he drew studio cards for Box Cards. He lived for several months in Manhattan in 1962 before returning to the West Coast.

=== Underground comix ===
In the early 1960s, Beck moved into a converted closet in a housing unit near the campus of U.C. Berkeley, known as Haste House, and he continued to do cartoons for The Pelican. During that time he published three underground comic books, Lenny of Laredo, Marching Marvin, and The Profit. The San Francisco Chronicle commented:

In 1965, his first full-length comic book, Lenny of Laredo, was published. It was a satire loosely based on the career of embattled comedian Lenny Bruce. Mr. Beck's protagonist, a child named Lenny, achieves fame and fortune by uttering "obscenities" such as "pee-pee thing", only to find his career in the dumps when the public becomes satiated with his naughtiness. Two other books, Marching Marvin and The Profit, followed. All are collector's items today.

In 1965, humor magazine editors voted to choose the nation's top college cartoonist and gave the honor to Beck. In January 1966, The Pelican reprinted much of his previous work and labeled him "Man of the Decade". His cartoons also appeared in the Berkeley Barb, and he penned a number of handbills and posters for the Jabberwock coffeehouse on Telegraph Avenue in Berkeley. In addition, he was a founding member and regular contributor to the underground anthology Yellow Dog, published from 1968 to 1973.

In a detailed 1987 self-portrait, Beck depicted himself in an ecstatic state, high on the act of creation, as he labored at his drawing table late into the night, surrounded by his books, artwork, comics, Pepsi and dog.

=== Fine art ===
Beck was also a traditional artist, working with acrylic, watercolour and oil painting.

=== Death ===
Beck died on September 21, 1999, from complications from alcoholism in Point Richmond, California.

== Tributes ==
Kevin Fagan wrote Beck's obituary for the San Francisco Chronicle:

Joel Beck, whose cutting-edge cartoons in the 1960s in the Berkeley Barb and elsewhere made him one of the founding oddballs of underground comics, died in his sleep of natural causes last week at home in Point Richmond. Mr. Beck, 56, had been ill off and on for years from complications related to tuberculosis and alcoholism, family members said, but he was still inking artworks for fans and advertising clients until the end. The quirky, irreverent humor that spilled from his personality into his pen made him a beloved figure in the tiny Contra Costa County community he had called home for the past two decades. When word of his September 14 death got out, people from all over the area began to show up at Point Richmond's Santa Fe Market, where Mr. Beck often hung out, to drop off mementos. Yesterday, the market's front window was plastered with more than 50 cartoons, letters and articles paying tribute to the artist whose 1960s fame continued to make him a legend long after his career waned. "People just keep bringing this cool stuff in. They loved Joel," said market owner Bob Peckham, a longtime friend. "He was different. He had a great wit."
