= Gilbert Shelton =

American cartoonist (born 1940)

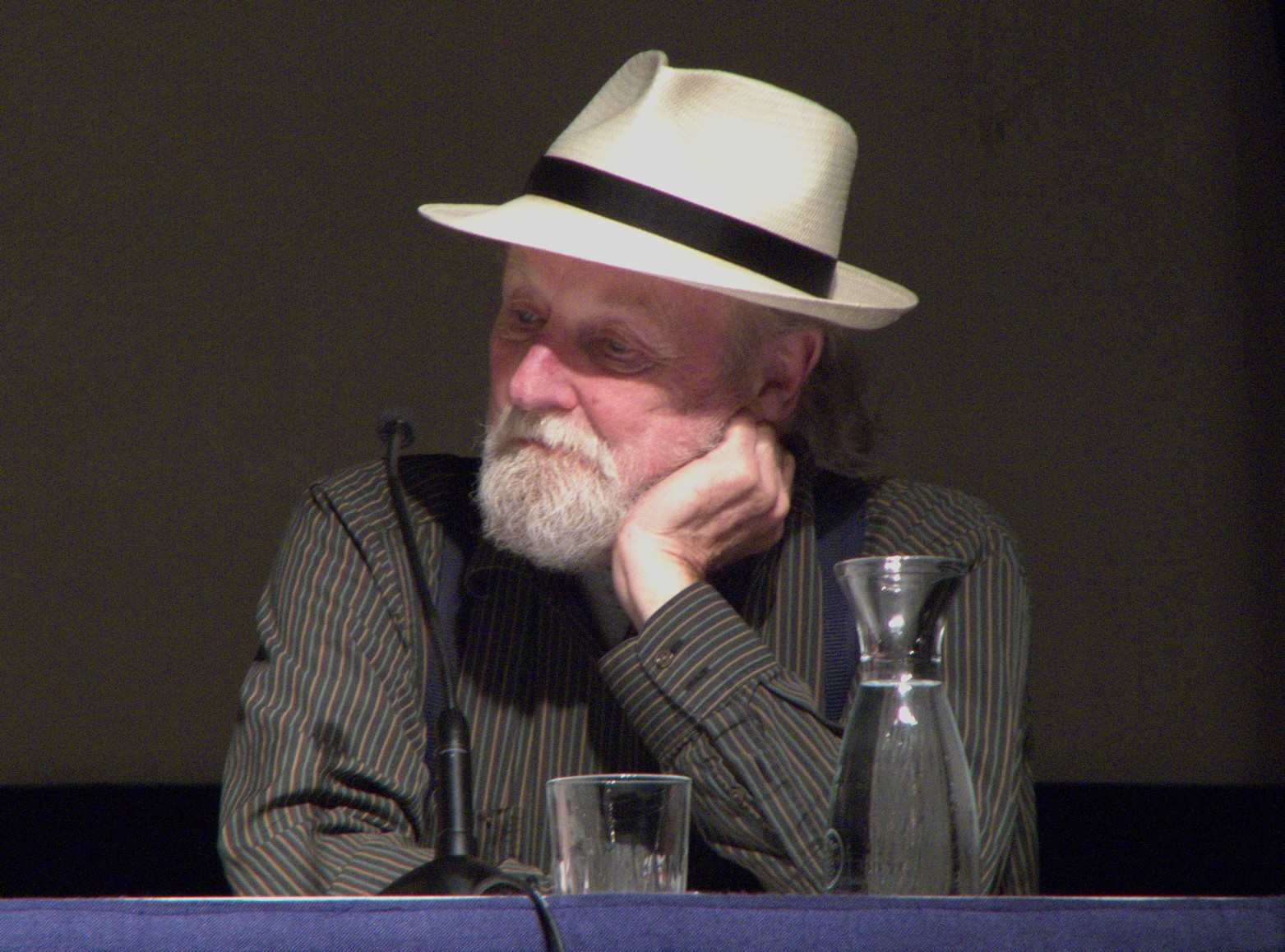
- Shelton at Comicfestival München 2013
- Born: May 31, 1940 (age 86) Dallas, Texas, U.S.
- Area: Cartoonist
- Pseudonym: Ghoulbert Chesterton
- Notable works: The Fabulous Furry Freak Brothers; Fat Freddy's Cat; Wonder Wart-Hog; Not Quite Dead
- Collaborators: Dave Sheridan, Paul Mavrides, Pic
- Awards: Inkpot Award, 1978; Will Eisner Award Hall of Fame, 2012
- Spouse: Lora Fountain

Gilbert Shelton (born May 31, 1940) is an American cartoonist and a key member of the underground comix movement. He is the creator of the iconic underground characters The Fabulous Furry Freak Brothers, Fat Freddy's Cat, and Wonder Wart-Hog.

== Biography ==
=== Early life and education ===
Shelton was born in Dallas, Texas, on May 31, 1940. His father, George Shelton, worked for Firestone, which moved the family around the southeast during the 1940s. They settled in Houston, Texas, where he graduated from Lamar High School. He attended Washington and Lee University, Texas A&M University, and the University of Texas at Austin, where he received his bachelor's degree in the social sciences in 1961. His early cartoons were published in the University of Texas humor magazine The Texas Ranger.

=== Early career ===
Directly after graduation, Shelton moved to New York City and got a job editing automotive magazines, where he would sneak his drawings into print. Early work of his was published in Warren Publishing's Help! The idea for the character of Wonder Wart-Hog, a porcine parody of Superman, came to him in 1961. The following year, Shelton moved back to Texas to enroll in graduate school and get a student deferment from the draft. The first two Wonder Wart-Hog stories appeared in Bacchanal, a short-lived college humor magazine, in the spring of 1962. That same year, he published (in zine form) Frank Stack's The Adventures of Jesus, one of the first underground comix; Stack wrote and drew the comic strip under the name Foolbert Sturgeon.

Shelton then became editor of The Texas Ranger and published more Wonder Wart-Hog stories.

After switching from graduate school to art school (where he befriended singer Janis Joplin) for two years, he was finally drafted, but Army doctors declared him medically unfit after he admitted to taking psychedelic drugs. After this, in 1964 and 1965, he spent some time in Cleveland, where his girlfriend Pat Brown (another UT alum) was studying at the Cleveland Institute of Art. He applied for a job at the Cleveland-based American Greeting Card Company (where a fellow underground comic artist Robert Crumb had worked) but was turned down.

The period of 1965–1968 was an itinerant one for Shelton: he moved to New York to work for the underground paper East Village Other, and to Los Angeles to work for the Los Angeles Free Press. Then Shelton became art director for the Vulcan Gas Company, a rock music venue in Austin, Texas, where he worked with Jim Franklin. He created a number of posters in the style of contemporary California poster artists such as Victor Moscoso and Rick Griffin. After a year of this, he moved to San Francisco in 1968, hopeful that being closer to the action would enable him to do more poster work.

That same year, Millar Publishing Company, who had been publishing regular Wonder Wart-Hog stories since 1966, published two issues of Wonder Wart-Hog. 140,000 copies of each were printed, but distributors did not pick up the magazine, and only 40,000 of each were sold.

=== Underground comix star ===
Also in 1968 Shelton self-published Feds 'n' Heads, a collection of strips first published in the Austin underground paper The Rag. The comic featured Wonder Wart-Hog and what became his most famous strip, The Fabulous Furry Freak Brothers. The first edition of Feds 'N' Heads was hand-collated, folded, and stapled by Shelton in his garage, with an initial print run of 5,000 copies; it proved so popular that it was later re-issued multiple times by the San Francisco-based publisher the Print Mint, selling over 200,000 total copies by 1980.

In 1969, Shelton co-founded Rip Off Press with three fellow "expatriate" Texans: Fred Todd, Dave Moriaty, and cartoonist Jack Jackson. Rip Off Comix published 13 issues of The Fabulous Furry Freak Brothers comic from 1971 to 1997, with many issues undergoing multiple printings. Shelton created a spin-off strip, Fat Freddy's Cat, in 1969.

During this period, Shelton was also a regular contributor to Zap Comix and other underground titles, including Bijou Funnies, Yellow Dog, Arcade, The Rip Off Review of Western Culture, and Anarchy Comics. Along with R. Crumb, S. Clay Wilson, Robert Williams, "Spain" Rodriguez, and two artists with reputations as psychedelic poster designers, Victor Moscoso and Rick Griffin, Shelton became part of the "Zap collective," which remained mostly constant throughout the nearly 50-year history of Zap.

In the 1970s, Shelton managed the Rip Off Press Syndicate, which sold weekly content, including Shelton's own strips, to alternative newspapers and student publications. Much of the material produced for the syndicate was eventually published in the company's long-running anthology Rip Off Comix, which had debuted in 1977.

Shelton designed the cover art for the 1973 album Doug Sahm and Band, as well as The Grateful Dead's 1978 album, Shakedown Street.

He also illustrated the cover of the early classic computer magazine compilation The Best of Creative Computing Volume 2 in 1977.

In 1979, Universal Studios paid Shelton and Rip Off Press $250,000 for the rights to make a live-action Fabulous Furry Freak Brothers film. Shelton used his share (which was the bulk of the money) to finance repeated trips to Europe, and to eventually settle down in France. Meanwhile, the Universal-produced Freak Brothers film never made it to production.

=== Later work ===
Shelton's Not Quite Dead, done in collaboration with French cartoonist Pic, appeared in Rip Off Comix #25 (Winter 1989) and in six Not Quite Dead comic books (1993–1996).

A new Wonder Wart-Hog story appeared in Zap Comix #15 (Last Gasp, 2005), as well as The Complete Zap boxed set (Fantagraphics, 2014) which contained Zap #16; and a new Fabulous Furry Freak Brothers story appeared in Zap #16 as well.

Fifty Freakin' Years with the Fabulous Furry Freak Brothers was published in 2017 by Knockabout Comics. It contains new strips by Shelton, as well as his written introduction.

== Music ==
In 1966 Shelton formed the Gilbert Shelton Ensemble and released a 45 record on ESP Records, "If I Was A Hells Angel," b/w "Southern Stock Car Man," backed by members of the Austin psychedelic rock band The Conqueroo, consisting of Tom Bright, Bob Brown and Ed Guinn.

Since moving to France, Shelton has become part of a rhythm and blues group, the Blum Brothers, featuring Shelton on vocals and piano. The band features fellow cartoonist musician Bruno Blum on vocals and guitar. A Blum-produced album was recorded but not released. The Blum Brothers played at the Jockomo, a New Orleans-style bar in the 11th arrondissement of Paris.

== Personal life ==
Shelton and his wife, literary agent Lora Fountain, left San Francisco in 1979. They were residents of Barcelona, (Catalonia, Spain) in 1980–1981, and moved to France in 1984.

== In popular culture ==
=== Film and TV ===
There have been several attempts to film Shelton's Freak Brothers characters and over the years several film rights options have been taken on his work. None went to production. In 1978, the unauthorized pornographic film Up in Flames was released, which "ripped off the Freak Brothers [and R. Crumb's] Mr. Natural all in one go."

It was reported that Universal's acquisition of the Freak Brothers film rights in 1979 was in order to prevent competition against the Cheech & Chong franchise. Although a script was written, the film was never made.

At one point, the Freak Brothers' antics were reportedly being turned into a Broadway musical after a stop motion animated film, titled Grass Roots and produced by Celluloid Dreams, fell through..

Finally, in 2021, an animated series called Freak Brothers featuring the voices of Pete Davidson, John Goodman and Woody Harrelson, premiered on the streaming service Tubi. It was renewed for a second season, which began in June 2023.

=== Music ===
==== "Set My Chickens Free" ====
Shelton's strip "Set My Chickens Free," published in issue #1 of the Bijou Funnies comic (1968) has been used in multiple music projects:

- In 1969, the words were set to music by The Hub City Movers and recorded as "The Chicken Song"; re-released in 1983 as "Set Your Chickens Free".
- In David Carradine's 1975 album Grasshopper (and 1976 single "Cosmic Joke"), he uses the words in "Chicken Song."
- In 1994, Merle Haggard used the words in his song "Set My Chickens Free," released on his studio album 1994.

=== Literature ===
Shelton's "Set My Chickens Free" cartoon was also published on page 128 of Abbie Hoffman's Steal This Book (1971), illustrating its third section, "Liberate!"

== Bibliography ==
=== Wonder Wart-Hog ===
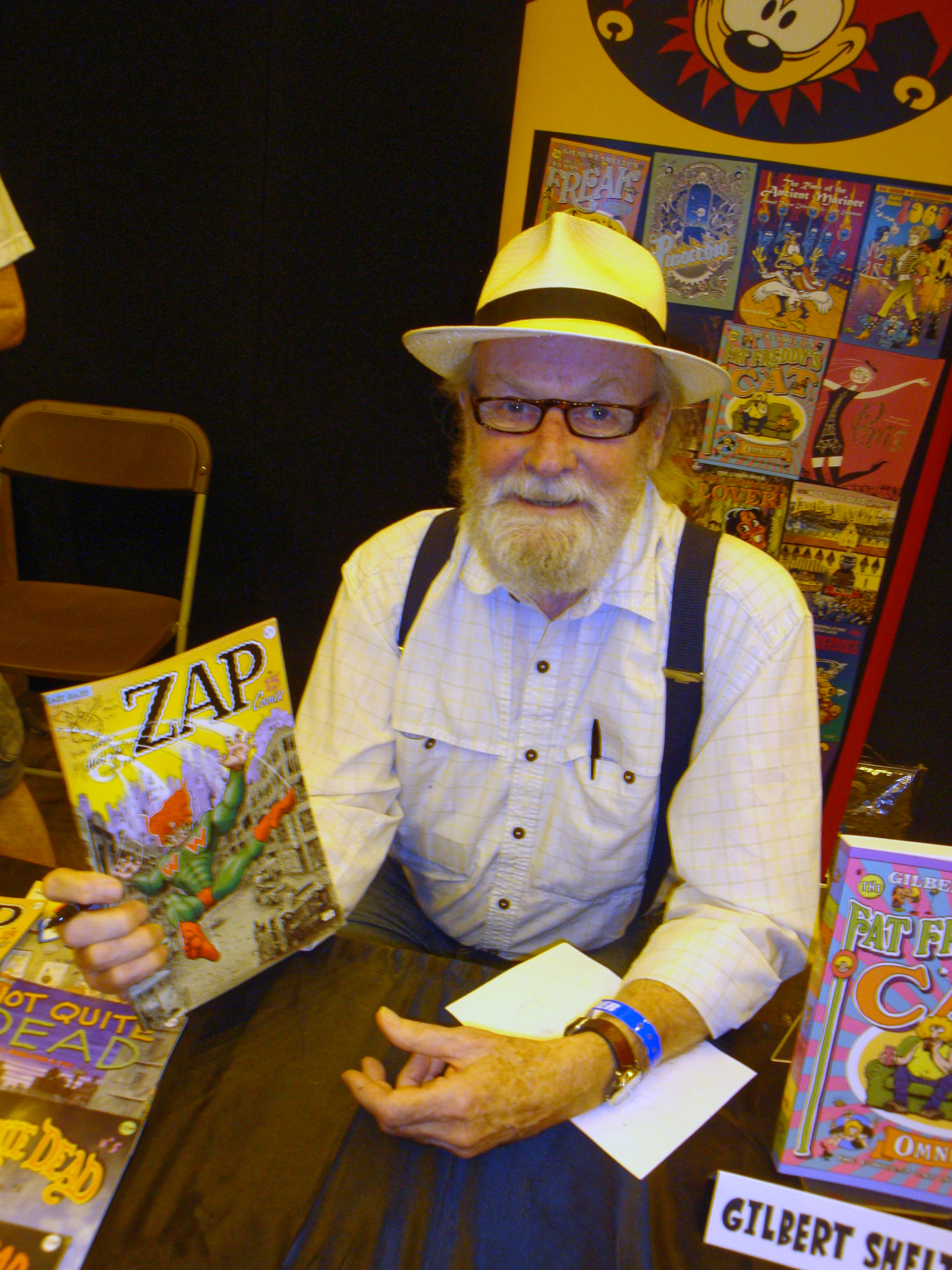
Gilbert Shelton at the London Film and Comic Con in July 2013

- Wonder Wart-Hog (2 issues, Millar Publishing Company, 1967)
- (Not Only) The Best of Wonder Wart-Hog (3 issues, Rip Off Press and the Print Mint, 1973) — issues #1-2 published by Rip Off Press, #3 by the Print Mint
- Wonder Wart-Hog, Hog of Steel (3 issues, Rip Off Press, 1995)
- Wonder Wart-Hog and The Battle of the Titans (Rip Off Press, 1985)
- Underground Classics #5 (Rip Off Press, 1987) —titled "Wonder Wart-Hog Vol. 1"
- Wonder Wart-Hog and the Nurds of November (Rip Off Press, 1988)
- The Best of Wonder Wart-Hog (Knockabout Comix, 2013)

=== The Fabulous Furry Freak Brothers ===
- The Fabulous Furry Freak Brothers (13 issues, Rip Off Press, 1971–1997) — with Dave Sheridan (1974–1982) and Paul Mavrides (1978–1997)
- Thoroughly Ripped with the Fabulous Furry Freak Brothers and Fat Freddy's Cat! (Rip Off Press, 1978) ISBN 9780896200777. There are 2 editions, one with a board game, one without
- Underground Classics #1 (Rip Off Press, 1985) — titled "The Fabulous Furry Freak Brothers #0"
- The Complete Fabulous Furry Freak Brothers, Volume One (Knockabout Comics, 2001) ISBN 0-86166-146-X — reprints The Fabulous Furry Freak Brothers #0–7 and 12
- The Complete Fabulous Furry Freak Brothers, Volume Two (Knockabout Comics, 2003) ISBN 0-86166-149-4 — reprints The Fabulous Furry Freak Brothers #8-11 and 13
- The Fabulous Furry Freak Brothers Omnibus (Knockabout Comics, 2008)
- Fifty Freakin' Years with the Fabulous Furry Freak Brothers (Knockabout Comics, 2017)

=== Fat Freddy's Cat ===
- The Collected Adventures of Fat Freddy's Cat and his Friends (Gilbert Shelton, 1975)
- The Adventures of Fat Freddy's Cat (Knockabout Comics, 1977) ISBN 0-8296-0054-X — reprints the four small Adventures of ... comix except for 4 strips from #2 and 1 strip from #3
- The Adventures of Fat Freddy's Cat Book 1 (Rip Off Press, 1977)
- The Adventures of Fat Freddy's Cat Book 2 (Rip Off Press, 1977)
- The Adventures of Fat Freddy's Cat Book 3 (Rip Off Press, 1977)
- The Adventures of Fat Freddy's Cat Book 4 (Rip Off Press, 1980) — titled "The Burning of Hollywood"
- The Adventures of Fat Freddy's Cat Book 5 (Rip Off Press, 1980)
- More Adventures of Fat Freddy's Cat (Rip Off Press, 1981) ISBN 0-89620-057-4 — reprints 91 one-page strips
- Fat Freddy's Comics & Stories (2 issues, Rip Off Press, 1983–1985)
- The Fat Freddy's Cat Omnibus (Knockabout Comics, 2009) ISBN 0-86166161-3 — reprints The Adventures of Fat Freddy's Cat #1-7, The Fabulous Furry Freak Brothers #1-6

=== Other titles ===
- Feds 'N' Heads (self-published, 1968) — re-issued in multiple printings by the Print Mint
- Give Me Liberty: A Revised History of the American Revolution 1976
- Underground Classics #12: "Gilbert Shelton in 3D" (Rip Off Press, 1990)
- Philbert Desanex' Dreams (Rip Off Press, 1993)
- Not Quite Dead (6 issues, Rip Off Press, 1993–1996; Knockabout Comics, 2005–2010) — with Pic
