= Last Gasp (publisher) =

American publishing company

- Founded: 1970; 56 years ago in Berkeley, California
- Founder: Ron Turner
- Headquarters location: San Francisco, California
- Distribution: SCB Distributors
- Key people: Colin Turner
- Publication types: Books, graphic novels, comics
- Nonfiction topics: Rock music, art, poetry
- Fiction genres: Underground comix
- Imprints: Hell Comics; Cocoanut Comics; Priaprism Press; Sexploitation Comics Group
- Official website: www.lastgasp.com

Last Gasp is a San Francisco–based book publisher with a lowbrow art and counterculture focus. Owned and operated by Ron Turner, for most of its existence Last Gasp was a publisher, distributor, and wholesaler of underground comix and books of all types.

Last Gasp was established in 1970. Although the company came onto the scene a bit later than some of the other underground publishers, Last Gasp continued publishing comics far longer than most of its competitors. In addition to publishing notable original titles like Slow Death, Wimmen's Comix, Binky Brown Meets the Holy Virgin Mary, and Weirdo, it also picked up the publishing reins of important titles—such as Zap Comix and Young Lust—from rivals who had gone out of business.

Although Last Gasp no longer publishes "floppy" comics; the company continues to publish art and photography books, graphic novels, fiction, and poetry, producing 10–15 new titles per year.

== History ==
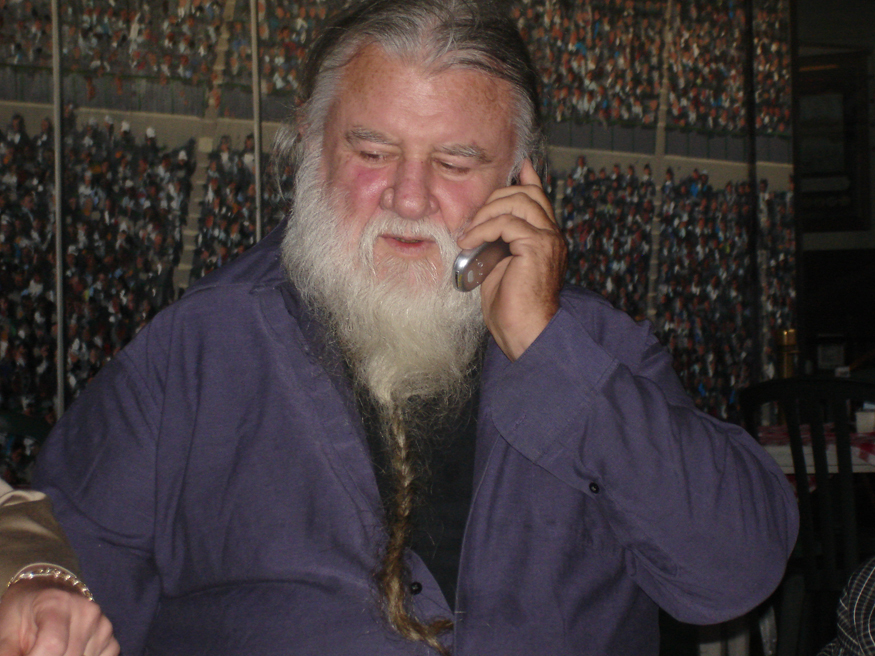
Ron Turner in 2007

Last Gasp Eco Funnies was founded in Berkeley, California, in 1970 by San Francisco State University graduate student Ronald E. Turner, with the help of Gary Arlington, to publish the ecologically-themed comics title Slow Death Funnies (in conjunction with the first Earth Day). Last Gasp followed Slow Death Funnies with the all-female anthology It Ain't Me, Babe, spearheaded by Trina Robbins.

Last Gasp was incorporated on September 11, 1971. In the time period 1971–1973, Last Gasp published Air Pirates Funnies #1–2 and a number of other Air Pirates-related titles, including The Tortoise and the Hare, Dopin' Dan #1–3, and Merton of the Movement. (Turner insists that he only served as an advisor to the Air Pirates collective, despite them crediting his company as "publisher.") Considered to be an "enabler" of the Air Pirates infamous Walt Disney parodies, Turner's name was added to Disney's lawsuit against the collective. Turner quickly settled with Disney, but Air Pirates Dan O'Neill, Bobby London, and Ted Richards continued fighting, in a case that dragged on for years.

The company's success with Slow Death and It Ain't Me, Babe enabled Last Gasp to expand into distribution, in addition to publishing. The company soon became a major part of the underground comix movement. Sociopolitical themes were explored in Last Gasp series such as Guy Colwell's Inner City Romance (1972–1979), which portrayed gritty urban tales; Armageddon (1973), which focused on anarcho-capitalism; and Anarchy Comics (1978), which focused on left-wing politics. In addition to publishing Wimmen's Comix for much of its run, Last Gasp published a number of other comix with feminist themes, including It Ain't Me, Babe, Tits & Clits Comix, Twisted Sisters #1, and Good Girls.

In 1972, Last Gasp published Justin Green's seminal autobiographical comic Binky Brown Meets the Holy Virgin Mary.

Beginning in 1972, Last Gasp began publishing ongoing titles moving over from other companies; beginning with Young Lust, and then Rand Holmes' Harold Hedd. In 1977, the company picked up Joyce Farmer and Lyn Chevely's Tits & Clits Comix, publishing that series until 1987. Last Gasp published the final three issues of San Francisco Comic Book in 1980–1983, and the latter half of Zap Comix' run from 1982 to 2005.

Last Gasp also published Weirdo from 1981 to 1993, and Cherry Poptart from 1982 to 1992.

In the early 1980s Last Gasp published some of the first books about the West Coast punk rock scene, including a number of titles by Peter Belsito.

Last Gasp moved its headquarters from Berkeley to San Francisco in c. 1975. Starting in 1975, Ron Turner began hosting the annual "Burritos, Beer & Cheer" holiday party at the Last Gasp offices, which was also a fundraiser for the Martin de Porres House of Hospitality, a free soup kitchen located in San Francisco. Last Gasp hosted "Burritos, Beer & Cheer" for more than 30 years.

In the period 2004–2010, Last Gasp published English-language compilations of popular manga titles, including Fumiyo Kouno's Town of Evening Calm, Country of Cherry Blossoms; Junko Mizuno's Pure Trance; and Keiji Nakazawa's Barefoot Gen.

In early December 2016, Last Gasp announced it was ending its comics distribution business to focus solely on book publishing. (As one of the last independent distributors, they handled comics distribution from more than 100 small comics publishers.) As a consequence, the company planned to lay off the bulk of its dozen employees by February 2017.

== Creators associated with Last Gasp ==
Notable artists published by Last Gasp include Tim Biskup, Robert Crumb, Richard Corben, Ron English, Camille Rose Garcia, Justin Green, Bill Griffith, John Howard, Greg Irons, Shawna Kenney, Spain Rodriguez, Mark Ryden, Dori Seda, Larry Welz, Robert Williams, Jay Howell, and S. Clay Wilson.

== Titles published (selected) ==
=== Comix ===
- The Adventures of Harold Hedd (1972–Sept. 1973)
- Anarchy Comics (4 issues; 1978–1987)
- Armageddon (3 issues; 1970–1973)
- Binky Brown Meets the Holy Virgin Mary (1972)
- Brain Fantasy (2 issues; May 1972–Jan. 1975)
- Cherry Poptart (13 issues; 1982–1992)
- Harlan Ellison's Chocolate Alphabet (Aug. 1975)
- Cocaine Comix (4 issues; 1975–1982)
- Dirty Laundry (1974, 1978, 1993)
- Dopin' Dan (3 issues; 1972–1979)
- Dr. Atomic (6 issues; Sept. 1972–Apr. 1981)
- Fresca Zizis (1977)
- Good Girls (6 issues; 1987–1991)
- Grim Wit (2 issues; June–Sept. 1973)
- Harold Hedd (3 issues, 1973–1984)
- Horny Biker Slut (13 issues; 1990–1998)
- Hup (4 issues; 1986–1992)
- Inner City Romance (5 issues; 1972–1978)
- It Ain't Me, Babe (July 1970)
- Last Gasp Comix & Stories (5 issues; 1994–1997)
- The Legion of Charlies (Fall 1971) — one-shot by Tom Veitch, Greg Irons, and Dave Sheridan
- Mickey Rat (2 issues; 1980–1982)
- Monolith (1972)
- Neurocomics (Mar. 1979)
- Skull (5 issues; 1970–1972)
- Slow Death Funnies/Slow Death (11 issues; 1970–1992)
- Tales from the Leather Nun (1973)
- Twisted Sisters #1 (1976)
- Weirdo (28 issues; Spring 1981–Summer 1993)
- Wimmen's Comix (10 issues; Spring 1981–Summer 1993)
- Young Lust (5 issues; 1972, 1987–1993)
- Zap Comix (16 issues; 1982–2005)

=== Manga translations ===
- Kouno, Fumiyo. Town of Evening Calm, Country of Cherry Blossoms (2004)
- Mizuno, Junko. Pure Trance (2005)
- Nakazawa, Keiji. Barefoot Gen (10 issues, 2004–2010)

=== Books ===
- Belsito, Peter, Bob Davis, and Marian Kester. StreetArt: The Punk Poster in San Francisco 1977-1981 (1981) ISBN 9780867193008
- Belsito, Peter and Bob Davis. Hardcore California: A History of Punk and New Wave (1983) ISBN 9780867193145
- Belsito, Peter. Notes From the Pop Underground (1985) ISBN 978-0867193374
- Blank, Joani (ed.) Femalia (2nd ed., 2011)
- Cometbus. Despite Everything: A Cometbus Omnibus (2002) ISBN 0-86719-561-4
- Corinne, Tee. The Cunt Coloring Book (1989)
- Davis, Mike. A Blind Man's Journey (2014)
- Griffith, Bill. Zippy Stories (1986). ISBN 0-86719-325-5
- Fitzgerald, F. Stop and Marian Kester. Dead Kennedys: The Unauthorized Version (1983) ISBN 0-86719-312-3
- LeRoy, J. T. with illustrations by Cherry Hood. Labour (2006) ISBN 9780867196542
- Perry, Michael with illustrations by Doug Cunningham. Turntable Timmy (paperback re-issue, 2015)
- Schorr, Todd. American Surreal (2008)

== See also ==
- List of book distributors
