= Marvin Gardens =

Marvin Gardens may refer to:

- Marven Gardens, a neighborhood in Margate City, New Jersey, United States, which is misspelled Marvin Gardens on the American Monopoly game board
- Marvin Gardens (band), an American folk-rock band from San Francisco, active during the late 1960s
- Marvin Gardens, pseudonym used by American singer-songwriter Jimmy Buffett for instrumental credits and for writing "Why Don't We Get Drunk"
- Marvin Gardens, Alberta, Canada, a locality in Strathcona County

== See also ==
- The Clown Died in Marvin Gardens, a 1968 album from the Beacon Street Union
- The King of Marvin Gardens, a 1972 American drama film
