= From A to Z, in the Chocolate Alphabet =

Short story collection by Harlan Ellison

- Short story by Harlan Ellison
- Country: United States
- Language: English
- Genres: Morality, mythology, history, humor

Publication
- Published in: The Magazine of Fantasy and Science Fiction
- Publication type: Periodical
- Publisher: Mercury Publications
- Media type: Magazine
- Publication date: Oct. 1976

"From A to Z, in the Chocolate Alphabet" is a collection by American writer Harlan Ellison, including 26 (one for each letter of the alphabet) extremely short stories on abstract and basically unrelated topics, displaying various aspects of Ellison's preoccupations with morality, mythology, the trivia of history, and humor. He wrote the collection in three days in the window of a bookstore.

"From A to Z, in the Chocolate Alphabet" appeared in the October 1976 issue of The Magazine of Fantasy & Science Fiction, where its genesis is explained in some detail in the afterword. It was reprinted as part of the Ellison collection Strange Wine and then adapted into comic book form by Larry Todd and published by Last Gasp.

== Background ==
The last of ten story titles Ellison had kept on his desk for years, "The Chocolate Alphabet" was used (and expanded to its present title) when Ellison wrote the story in the window of a Los Angeles science fiction bookshop, A Change of Hobbit.

The story was sparked by a painting by underground cartoonist Larry Todd entitled 2 Nemotropin, which Ellison saw in 1974, and around which he promised to write an eight-page comic story illustrated by Todd, and published by "San Francisco underground comix magnate Ron Turner" and his company Last Gasp Eco-Funnies.

Flash-forward to February 1976. Ellison began a week-long stint literally in the front window of A Change of Hobbit, writing a complete story each day for six days as a fund-raiser. (This was the first in a long series of such stunts for other bookstores and in other locations, although Ellison had written short stories to order earlier, notably "O Ye of Little Faith" at the 1965 Westercon in Long Beach, California, to three words — "serape", "polyp", and "minotaur" — provided at an auction by the winning bidder, Larry Niven, whose last name is that of the story's protagonist.) On Monday, February 23, 1976, Ellison wrote the 3000-word story, "Strange Wine," subsequently reprinted (along with other stories written the same week) in his 1978 collection of the same name. On Tuesday, realizing that he could not write an eight-page story for the comic based on Todd's painting, he resolved to write 26 short-short stories, some as brief as one sentence, as a pastiche of Fredric Brown, the master of such brief stories. "From A to Z, in The Chocolate Alphabet" was begun that day and, after writing into the wee hours, was finished on Wednesday, February 25, 1976, at around 1:30 p.m.

The comic book version, Harlan Ellison's Chocolate Alphabet, with cover and art by Larry Todd, appeared in 1978, published by Last Gasp.

== Sequel ==
Ellison wrote a sort of sequel to this entitled, "From A to Z, in the Sarsaparilla Alphabet," on November 10, 1990, at the bookstore Dangerous Visions in Sherman Oaks, California, beginning it in the window and then inside the store with his manual typewriter and completing it after health issues, which interrupted the writing, were addressed. Although a few people had seen it—photocopies were given to those who purchased over $50 worth of books while the story was being written—the story sat unpublished for nearly ten years, because Ellison, highly prolific at the time, had forgotten about marketing it (and even forgot to include it in his latest collection, Slippage).

After "From A to Z, in the Sarsaparilla Alphabet" was published in The Magazine of Fantasy & Science Fiction in 2001, it was nominated for a Bram Stoker Award. And because the 26 short-short stories in this novelette deal with gods and demons, it was subsequently collected in the expanded version of Deathbird Stories, published in 2011 by Subterranean Press.
