= Welcome to Carcass Cuntry =

Studio album by Jeff Walker und Die Flüffers
- Released: May 9, 2006
- Recorded: Sep 2004 – Aug 2005
- Genre: Country metal
- Label: Fractured Transmitter
- Producer: Jeffrey Walker

Welcome to Carcass Cuntry is a country metal album by Jeffrey Walker, of the metal band Carcass. The instrumentation is performed by notable heavy metal musicians, including Faith No More's Billy Gould, H.I.M.'s Ville Valo, Anathema's Danny Cavanagh and Carcass members Bill Steer and Ken Owen. The album cover is by Larry Welz, the creator of Cherry.

== Production ==
The album was recorded between September 2004 and August 2005.

== Music ==
In an interview with Decibel magazine, Walker said "It's really not that original of an idea when you consider that Mike Ness has already done a country-hybrid album. But I don't think anyone from a background like mine has done it, and done it with a bit of respect — not turning it into a piss take."

== Reception ==
Professional ratings
Review scores
Source	Rating
ApeShit	favorable
Dusted Reviews	favorable
Lords of Metal	79/100
Metal Review	(8.1/10)
PopMatters	6/10 stars

PopMatters complimented the album for being "fun".

== Track listing ==
No.	Title	Writer(s)	Length
1.	"The Man Comes Around"	Johnny Cash	4:08
2.	"I Can't Help It (If I'm Still in Love with You)"	Hank Williams	2:52
3.	"You're Still on My Mind"	Luke McDaniel	2:11
4.	"Sunday Mornin' Comin' Down"	Kris Kristofferson	5:25
5.	"Mississippi"	Werner Theunissen	4:30
6.	"I Just Dropped In (To See What Condition My Condition Was In)"	Mickey Newbury	3:33
7.	"I'm So Lonesome I Could Cry"	Hank Williams	3:15
8.	"Once a Day"	Bill Anderson	2:01
9.	"The End of the World"	Arthur Kent, Sylvia Dee	2:55
10.	"Rocky Mountain High"	John Denver	5:31
11.	"Keep On Rocking in the Free World"	Neil Young	5:03

== Personnel ==
- Niclas Etelävuori - Engineer
- Billy Gould - Engineer
- Mika Jussila - Mastering
- Santeri Kallio - Engineer, Mixing
- Tina Korhonen - Photography
- James Murphy - Engineer
- Jeffrey Walker - Mixing, Producer
- Larry Welz - Artwork
