= Croatoan (short story) =

Short story by Harlan Ellison

- Short story by Harlan Ellison
- "Croatoan"'s first publication, in F&SF, featured a cover by Dario Campanile.
- Country: United States
- Language: English

Publication
- Published in: The Magazine of Fantasy & Science Fiction
- Publication type: Magazine
- Publication date: 1975

"Croatoan" is a short story by American writer Harlan Ellison published in 1975 in The Magazine of Fantasy and Science Fiction, and anthologized in Strange Wine; an illustrated version appeared in Heavy Metal in 1978. The story won a Locus Award. The story is also used as a specimen of analysis by Stephen King in Danse Macabre.

== Plot summary ==
Gabe is forced by a hysterical girlfriend to descend into New York City's sewers, into which he has just flushed her aborted fetus. Arriving there, he finds that fetuses populate the sewers, astride similarly disposed-of crocodiles, and the word "Croatoan", crudely lettered on a wall near the entrance to the sewer.

== Reception ==
"Croatoan" won the 1976 Locus Award for Best Short Story and was a finalist for the 1976 Hugo Award for Best Short Story.

== Themes and structure ==
Although abortion figures into the plot of "Croatoan", the issues surrounding abortion are not central themes in the story. In the story's introduction, Ellison states that the story is neither for nor against abortion, but rather a promotion of personal responsibility (he goes on to say that after writing the story he had a vasectomy). The story is character driven, focusing on Gabe's growth beyond the pleasures of sex and casual relationships to embracing fatherhood and maturity. The critic Joseph Patrouch comments that the theme of searching for the responsibilities and maturity of fatherhood present in this story complements the recurring theme of searching for a father figure that is present in much of Ellison's work.

Patrouch also comments that the structure of the story highlights the emphasis on character over actions. Three distinct flashbacks are used at different moments in the narration in order to further develop the character of Gabe. The development of the plot is governed by Gabe's growth rather than external events. The non-linear narrative structure of "Croatoan" is typical of Ellison's style, and is a feature of many of his most famous stories.
