= Strange Wine =

Short story collection

Strange Wine: Fifteen New Stories from the Nightside of the World
- First edition cover
- Author: Harlan Ellison
- Cover artist: Leo and Diane Dillon
- Language: English
- Genre: Speculative fiction
- Published: 1978 (Harper & Row)
- Publication place: United States
- Media type: Print (paperback)
- Pages: 262
- ISBN: 0-06-011113-5
- OCLC: 3446973

Strange Wine is a collection of short stories by American writer Harlan Ellison, published in 1978.

== Contents ==
The book contains the following stories (as well as Ellison's own introduction for each tale):

- "Introduction: Revealed at Last! What Killed the Dinosaurs! And You Don't Look So Terrific Yourself"
- "Croatoan"
- "Working With the Little People"
- "Killing Bernstein"
- "Mom"
- "In Fear of K"
- "Hitler Painted Roses"
- "The Wine Has Been Left Open Too Long and the Memory Has Gone Flat"
- "From A to Z, in the Chocolate Alphabet"
- "Lonely Women are the Vessels of Time"
- "Emissary from Hamelin"
- "The New York Review of Bird"
- "Seeing"
- "The Boulevard of Broken Dreams"
- "Strange Wine"
- "The Diagnosis of Dr. D'arqueAngel"

== Reception ==
Ellison wrote "Strange Wine" (the story) while sitting in the window of Westwood-area science fiction bookstore, A Change of Hobbit.

Stephen King considered this one of the best horror fiction books published between 1950 and 1980 in his 1981 non-fiction book about the horror genre, Danse Macabre, specifically reviewing the stories "Croatoan", "Hitler Painted Roses", "Lonely Women are the Vessels of Time", "Emissary from Hamelin", and "From A to Z, in the Chocolate Alphabet".
