= Octobriana =

Russian comic superheroine

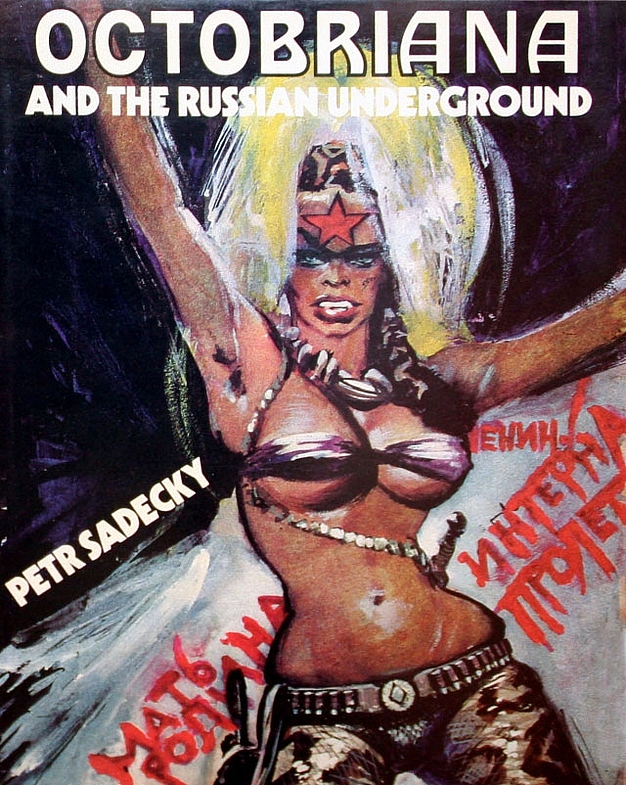
- Cover of Octobriana and the Russian Underground, published in the UK by Tom Stacey Ltd, 1971

Publication information
- Publisher: Tom Stacey Ltd.
- First appearance: Octobriana and the Russian Underground (1971)
- First comic appearance: Near Myths #3 (December 1978)
- Created by: Bohumil Konečný, Zdeněk Burian, Petr Sadecký

In-story information
- Alter ego: Mahari, Amazona
- Notable aliases: Oktobriana

Octobriana is a Russian superhero created by Petr Sadecký by modifying the work of Czech artists Bohumil Konečný and Zdeněk Burian for an unpublished comic book series Sadecký commissioned them to do, under the working title of Amazona.

As a character embodying Communist ideals, Octobriana was said to be usable by anyone, rather than being copyrighted by an author or corporation. This has resulted in the character appearing in various artistic works since her first official published appearance in the political art book Octobriana and the Russian Underground, by Petr Sadecký, published by Tom Stacey in 1971. Petr Sadecký had created a fictitious real life origin for the character, which he presented as true.

== Octobriana and the Russian Underground ==
In Octobriana and the Russian Underground, Sadecký describes the PPP as a loose group of cells, not only in Russia, but throughout the Soviet Union. This group, Sadecký wrote, started around 1957, after the 20th Congress of the Communist Party of the Soviet Union in 1956. At first they called themselves Progressivnaya Politika (Progressive Politics) and tried to go back to the pure principles of the White movement and their Scandinavian roots; the Rus' people. They were descendants of the Vikings.

Later, they put together samizdat comics about the superheroine Octobriana, a character said to embody the principles of the Russian Revolution and battle against both Russian and American oppression. Sadecky provided a history for Octobriana where she is said to be thousands of years old and the child of a Viking and a Toltec princes, whose original name was Mahari (which means "divine maiden" in Sanskrit). She was given radiation treatments that made her immortal and reborn as a superhuman in a radioactive volcano. Her ethnicity has often shifted; the initial Amazona character seems to have been a confused mix of different indigenous backgrounds. In Sadecky's book, she was said to have Mongolian features. Later portrayals have often ignored this and rendered her as white.

Consistent features about her include an Amazonian physique (steely muscles, large breasts, shapely buttocks), long blonde hair tied back with a leopard's tail (which Octobriana tore out of the animal by its roots), a live snake coiled around her right wrist, low-riding snakeskin pants, and either a white crop top or a black band that barely contains her breasts. Her most distinctive feature is a red five-pointed star apparently tattooed on her forehead.

Sadecky portrayed her as a legendary figure who has been sighted throughout history; there are reports from Siberia, Spain in the time of the Spanish Inquisition, Chinese explorer Zhang Qian, and an unpublished book by left wing Moroccan politician Mehdi Ben Barka. She has been called The White She-Dragon, The Girl with the White Face Coming from the Sky, The Mother of the Seven Red Stars, Angelic Maiden who Turned into a Devil, the Avenger.

It is said that she comes from an ancient civilization and was granted immortality by radiation treatments, then underwent an ordeal in a radioactive volcano which transformed her into a superhuman being. She pilots the Wonder Machine, which travels through time and space, crewed by Native Americans. Her weapons and equipment include a Smith & Wesson revolver, a kris knife, and a shark-tooth necklace which can detect radiation.

One story was "The Living Sphinx of the Kamchatka Radioactive Volcano 1934", in which she swims into a radioactive volcano and kills a giant walrus with her kris. Afterwards, she brings the tribesmen of the Koryaks home with a giant flying ball. Another story was titled "Octobriana and the Atomic Suns".

Octobriana in Brian Talbot's The Adventures of Luther Arkwright

== The Octobriana hoax ==
The supposed origin of the character was in actuality Sadecký's own creation. Petr Sadecký, while still in Prague, enlisted the help of two Czech artists, Bohumil Konečný and Zdeněk Burian, in creating a comic centering on the character of "Amazona." Sadecký told the two that he had a buyer interested in the comic, and they worked together on writing and illustrating the Amazona comic.

However, Sadecký betrayed his friends by stealing all the artwork and escaping to the West. When there was no publisher interest after a number of years, Sadecký changed the Amazona strips into a political statement, by adding a red star to the character's forehead, creating an elaborate back story, and renaming her as "Octobriana: the spirit of the October Revolution".

When news reached Konečný, he was shocked that his work had been misused without his consent, and eventually managed to confront Sadecký at the office of the German publishing house that Sadecký was employed by. Under the threat of legal action, some of the stolen artwork was returned, but Sadecký went to the UK shortly afterwards with pages and cover art that he had stolen, finding a sympathetic publisher for his fictional Octobriana story in Tom Stacey, who was unaware of the previous controversy.

Major inconsistencies in the story Sadecký presented in the published Octobriana and the Russian Underground book, and a panel in his book where Octobriana is referred to as "Amazona" (p. 83), lend credence to this story. In addition, Burian and Konečný sued Sadecký in a West German court, winning the case but never recovering all their stolen artwork.

As Octobriana is still widely believed to be the product of dissident cells within the U.S.S.R., she is not copyrighted, and has appeared in a variety of artistic incarnations.

Octobriana: Filling in the Blanks issue 1 from Artful Salamander, November 1997

== Other appearances ==
=== Comics ===
Appearances in other comics include:

The Adventures of Luther Arkwright by Bryan Talbot. Octobriana featured in 'The Firefrost Principle', issue 3 of the Valkyrie Press series, as well as on the cover. Talbot was said to have included Octobriana after first reading about her in a Daily Telegraph article in 1971, publicising the release of the Octobriana and the Russian Underground book in the UK.

Cherry's Jubilee #2, an erotic comic by Larry Welz published by Tundra Publishing in 1992, starring Cherry Poptart. Cherry and her friend Ellie Dee meet, befriend, and get into an orgy with Octobriana. The comic included a two-page text recapping Sadecky's book.

Octobriana ja helvetin X piiri (Octobriana and the Tenth Circle of Hell) by creators Reima Makinen, Petri Tolppanen and Timo Niemi, published in Finland during 1997.

The Octobriana limited series from Revolution Comics is the first time Octobriana appeared in a solo comic book series, which ran for six issues (an issue 0 preceded the main 5 issue series) and was published in the UK and USA between 1996 and 1997. It featured two strips, one written by Stu Taylor and illustrated by Blake O'Farrell with Octobriana and members of the PPP (including Petr Sadecky) set in a 1960s Soviet Union. The second strip - Return of Octobriana - was written by John A. Short and featured a different artist for each of its five chapters, and was set in a contemporary 1990s Russia.

Octobriana Filling in the Blanks - mini-series from Artful Salamander in 1997/8 2 issue comic series written by Stu Taylor and illustrated by Dave Roberts and Mark Woolley.

Octobriana in Poseur Ink's Octobriana

"I Fell In Love With A Russian Devil-Woman" - short story in Romantic Tails anthology issue 1 from Head Press in July 1998. Written by Stu Taylor and illustrated by Dave Roberts and Mark Woolley.

Nikolai Dante: "The Octobriana Seduction", written by Robbie Morrison, drawn by Andy Clarke and published in 2000 AD in 1998.

Armageddon Patrol: The Shot - one-shot from Alchemy Texts in 1998 by John A. Short. Octobriana clashes with the Armageddon Patrol's Maiden America during the Vietnam War.

The Octobriana Special from Alchemy Texts in 2001 - a one-shot comic (with features) written by John A. Short. Including a continuation of Short's Return of Octobriana storyline from the Revolution Comics mini-series with Commie Zombie Dictator from Hell drawn by Shaun Bryan.

She also made an appearance in the Dutch comic strip series Agent 327 by Martin Lodewijk in the album "Cacoïne and Commando's" (2000), where a character that resembles Octobriana is introduced. In the comic strip the character is called "Novembriana", but a reference is made to the samizdat album in which she first appeared.

In 2010, the comic book company Poseur Ink announced a new title based on Octobriana, written by Steve Orlando and illustrated by Chaz Truog (DC Comics, Marvel Comics). In early 2010 the company started a Kickstarter fundraiser to start early pre-orders for the upcoming project.

The noted underground/erotic cartoonist John Linton Roberson is co-starring Octobriana, along with a number of other public domain comics characters including Projunior, in his most recent VLADRUSHKA series in 2012, and has announced she will be revealed to be the title character's long-lost sister.

The New Amazons Preview Special from Kult Creations in September 2013 written by John A. Short and illustrated by Gabrielle Noble, depicting the New Amazons clash with Vladimir Putin. Short later wrote a book on the history of Octobriana, Octobriana: The Underground History, which also contains a new Octobriana story drawn by Noble. On May 9, 2020, Eisner Award-winning cartoonist and graphic designer Jim Rugg launched a Kickstarter campaign for a new Octobriana comic, Octobriana 1976.

Octobriana With Love, an all-new, full colour, comic book celebrating the 50 year anniversary of Octobriana, was announced by Dead Good Comics on 13 January 2021. A Kickstarter campaign followed during April / May 2021. Edited by Stu Taylor and published in November 2021, creators for the graphic novel anthology included Stephanie Phillips, Marc Laming, Simon Fraser, Andrea Towers, Stephen Byrne, Andy Belanger, Joyce Chin, Michael Cho, Nicole Goux, Juni Ba and Marguerite Sauvage.

In 2023, the 264 pages long graphic novel Octobriana was published by the Czech publishing house Labyrint. The authors, Marek Berger and Ondřej Kavalír, explore the origin story of Octobriana as well as ideological, genre and gender stereotypes of the era when the character was created.

=== David Bowie ===
- A film to star Amanda Lear and to be produced by David Bowie was announced in 1974 but was never made. David Bowie allegedly had also written music for the movie.
- David Bowie included Octobriana and the Russian Underground in his Top 100 books list published in October 2013

=== In other media ===
Other appearances include:

- As a tattoo on Billy Idol's arm
- The short Finnish film Octobriana and the Finger of Lenin (2003) starring Noora Piili.
- Recruited to a superhero team on episode 66 of the tabletop RPG podcast Tales of Nowhere. She subsequently appears in 67 and 68.
- The cover of Octobriana and the Russian Underground appeared as a poster during the second episode of British comedy horror web series Truth Seekers, created by Nick Frost, Simon Pegg, James Serafinowicz and Nat Saunders. The series was released on Amazon Prime Video on October 30, 2020.

== Awards ==
- 1997: Won "Best New Comic (British)" National Comics Award, from the 1996 mini-series from Revolution Comics
