= Cherry (comics) =

Erotic comic series by Larry Welz

- logotype

Publication information
- Publisher: Last Gasp; Cherry Comics
- Schedule: Irregular
- Format: Ongoing series
- Genre: Erotic
- Publication date: 1982–2000; 2019-2025
- No. of issues: 24

Creative team
- Created by: Larry Welz

Cherry (originally Cherry Poptart) is an erotic comic book about a sexually adventurous 18-year-old woman and her friends, written and drawn by Larry Welz.

== Creation ==
Cover of the first issue

Welz created Cherry Poptart, first appearing in underground comic Funnybook #1, in 1971. Though the character and subsequent self-titled comic is largely known as an erotic or pornographic book, it does garner critical merit for its humor and occasional political commentary. The Cherry character has also appeared in several free speech/censorship awareness campaigns.

Contrasting the subject matter with more "innocent" connotations, Welz draws the comic in a simple style reminiscent of Dan DeCarlo, whose style was also the basis for the Archie comic book series. The strip so closely followed the "Happy Teenager" genre typified by Archie that lawsuits were threatened, but these failed to stop Welz. The series frequently parodied other pop culture material and current events.

== Publication history ==
The series was first published in 1982 by small press company Last Gasp as Cherry Poptart. The first issue was an anthology, featuring three Cherry Poptart stories, one featuring another Welz character called Trina Tron, and two strips featuring similarly-themed strips from other underground cartoonists – Larry Todd's Vamperotica and Jay Kinney's The Wholesome Twins. This format was dropped for later issues, which largely revolved around Cherry and her friends, though each issue usually featured multiple shorter stories. The Todd and Kinney stories were also dropped from subsequent reprints of the series. From the third issue the book was retitled Cherry; Welz has stated this was in response to threats of legal action by Kellogg's over its Pop-Tarts trademark. Inside the comic the name was still occasionally used for the character, but generally the character was simply referred to as 'Cherry'.

On occasion Welz would search for other artists to help on the title in the hope of moving it to a quarterly schedule, though generally he continued the title as a solo effort. In issue #8 Ellie is prominently featured in an Oz mockery called "Ellie Dee in the Land of Woz"; this was originally planned as a spin-off title (tentatively called Cherry's Pal Ellie Dee in the Land of Woz) but instead ran in the pages of Cherry. The name was also a pun on Apple Computer co-founder Steve Wozniak.

Tundra Publishing also published a spinoff series called Cherry's Jubilee for stories from other creators, ranging from underground comix figures such as Grass Green to mainstream figures like Marv Wolfman. In 1993, Kitchen Sink Press took over from Last Gasp as the series' publisher for Cherry #14 through #19, also reprinting the first 13 issues and taking over Cherry's Jubilee. In 1998, Welz formed his own Cherry Comics, which issued Cherry Deluxe, a planned anthology similar to Cherry's Jubilee; the first issue featured a story by Neil Gaiman. No further issues of Cherry Deluxe followed but Cherry Comics took over publication of the regular series from #20 onwards, again issuing fresh reprints of the previous issues.

The series is among the largest-selling of the underground comics, and is among those titles credited with reviving that genre. As of 2026 no new issues have been released for 1 years.

== Characters ==
- Cherry Poptart: the main character. Cherry Poptart is blonde, liberal, upbeat, promiscuous and insatiable – she will have sexual intercourse with anyone of either sex (including her mother, and any of her female friends) and anything. Cherry does not age, but perpetually has "just turned 18". She is generally a high school student, though this will change without warning to fit in with a story, and rarely keeps a boyfriend outside a single strip.
- Cherry's mom: Pepper Poptart looks and acts much the same as her daughter, though when Cherry travels back in time she finds her mother was originally a straight-laced and prudish young lady. Cherry soon trained her in dressing provocatively, masturbation and lesbian sex before helping get her impregnated by one of George Washington, Davy Crockett, Jesse James or James Dean during a group sex session.
- Ellie Dee: Cherry's best friend, a dark-haired computer expert. Her appearances usually end up with Ellie and/or Cherry having adventures involving technology; in keeping with her stories' themes, her name is a homonym for LED. Despite her nerdish trappings, Ellie is every bit as sexually active as Cherry.
- Lola Palooza: a rich, stuck-up mobster's daughter into bondage and domination. She is sometimes an antagonist of Cherry and sometimes her friend.
- Patty Melt: another of Cherry's friends, Patty is short, buxom, and freckled, and once again has a voracious sexual appetite.
- Cinnamon Poptart: See "Legal issues."

The series also featured occasional cameos by another Welz creation, Captain Guts.

== Legal issues ==
Wary of accusations of creating child pornography, Welz included a disclaimer from Cherry Poptart #2 stating that all the characters were 18 or older. The same issue featured a single-page gag story in which Cherry's 16-year-old sister Cinnamon was indignant about not being allowed to perform any sex acts in the comic, due to being underage; the strip halts abruptly when Cinnamon starts to expose her breasts. Welz explained in The Gauntlet in 1992 that the issue and the character were intended to address the serious concern raised by his publisher that if Cherry was depicted as being under 18, the strip could be classified as child pornography. The strip remains the sole appearance of Cinnamon until the adult Cyn Poptart was featured in the Cherrypocalypse stories of issues 23 and 24. Cyn is now older than Cherry as Cherry and her friends did not age while they were absent from Earth between issues 22 and 23.

On August 30, 1990, Winsor Parker, the owner of Xeno's comic store in Jacksonville, Florida, was arrested after an undercover police officer purchased a copy of Cherry Anthology #1 from the store; the comic was ruled obscene by the judge under the same statute which had befallen recordings by 2 Live Crew. Parker pled not guilty, claiming he was unaware the material had been ruled obscene in Florida. Copies of Cherry were seized by Canadian police from Toronto store Dragon Lady comics in February 1991, along with issues of "Omaha" the Cat Dancer, works by Milo Manara and titles produced by Eros Comics. This and other busts in Canada led to the Comic Legends Legal Defense Fund creating the anthology comic The True North to raise funds for store owners facing legal charges.

Cherry is sometimes featured as a "spokesmodel" for the Comic Book Legal Defense Fund; since the body's formation it has been promoted in turn in the pages of Cherry.

== Stories ==
=== Cherry Poptart/Cherry ===
Issue	Date	Contents	Notes
Cherry Poptart #1	1982	"Hot Rod Boogie": Cherry will do anything to drive Ronnie's hot rod car.; "Vamperonica": wealthy Veronica Towers tries to get back stage to get her false teeth into rock star Mick Jugular. A 1979 strip by Larry Todd.; "The Wholesome Twins": twin sisters Julie and Sue argue over Sue's new job as a typist with the CIA. A 1975 strip by Jay Kinney.; "The Invitation": Cherry and Ellie get distracted getting ready for a party. A 1977 strip.; "'s Cool Daze": well-endowed teacher Mr. Feeney helps Cherry learn. A 1977 strip.; "The Psylicone Psyrcus": Trina Tron takes a stimu-pill. A 1977 strip.	"Vamperonica" and "The Wholesome Twins" were omitted from later print runs.
Cherry Poptart #2	1985	"Pool Cue": Cherry and her mom keep the pool guy sweet.; "Best Friends": Cherry placates her BDSM-enthusiast friend Monica after sleeping with her boyfriend.; "Le's Party!": Cherry throws a house-party, but her mom ends up the centre of attention.; "Down & Dirty": Cherry Coptart helps Captain Guts in a vice sting.; "A Personal Message from Cherry": Cherry breaks the fourth wall to announce her creed to readers.	
Cherry #3	1986	"Good Morning": Cherry wakes and recalls a dream about John Donson.; "Saturday the 8th Part 5 – The Beginning": a masked killer is no match for Cherry and her well-armed friends.; "Cherry Meets Rambone – Second Blood, Part Three": Cherry journeys into the Vietnamese jungle to find John Rambone.; "Vini, Vidi, Visa!": Cherry and Lola take a trip to the mall, causing chaos with their antics.; "Oklahoma Smith and the Lost Temple of the Doomed Raiders": Cherry helps Oklahoma Smith retrieve the Golden Idol.	
Cherry #4	1987	"The Babysitter": Cherry keeps numerous couples happy with her promiscuous babysitting.; "Cherry the Barbarian Chapter 73": Cherry finds a better way to defeat the guardian of a bridge.; "Good Ol' Mom": after nearly getting caught out double-dating, Cherry enlists her mom's help to keep both her visitors happy.; "Ellie Dee in Digitaland": a hacking attempt sees Ellie sucked into a computer world.	
Cherry #5	1987	"The Love Channel": Cherry catches up on the soaps.; "The Job Interview": Cherry's experience as a secretary for Wally Norse and John Wesley Hardon helps her land a job.; "The Clan of the Care Bear": after falling out of a car as a baby, Chayree grows up with a Neanderthal tribe.; "One in Wins Choice": Cherry earns a stuffed bear at the fair.; "Ellie Dee in Deep Shit": Ellie comes up with a device to help her interface with her computer.	The issue is dedicated to the memory of murder victim Sandy Patton.
Cherry #6	1988	"Cherry's Mom Scores Again": Cherry tries to help her mom warm up a date but the pair get distracted by each other.; "Fuckin' Beach Party, Man!": Cherry, Lola and Patty have fun at a beach house.; "Bimbos from Hell": a computer genius summons Cherry, Ellie, Lola and Patty from Hell to fulfil his wishes.; "The Artist in Torment": Cherry helps a frustrated cartoonist to steer clear of thoughtful narrative.; "Dori Seda's Mudwrestling Story": Larry Welz unsuccessfully attempts to get Dori Seda to draw a mud wrestling strip for the issue.	
Cherry #7	1988	"Girl Talk": Cherry, Lola and Patty eye up a new science teacher – who falls for Ellie instead.; "Space Cookie": Cherry is 'Social Director' onboard the space cruiser Cher when it is boarded by Dork Vulgar.; "Hooligan's Island": Cherry visits an island with some eclectic residents.	
Cherry #8	1989	"Ellie Dee in the Land of Woz": Ellie's computer transports her to the land of Woz.; "Nurse's Aid": Cherry's attempts to help an elderly patient backfire.; "Spaghetti-O Western": Cherry brings in outlaw Kitty Starr.	
Cherry #9	1990	"The Phantom Hitchhiker": a trucker has an encounter with Cherry.; "Mom's Closet": Cherry gets inspired by her mom's old clothes.; "Mad Maxine – The Road Whorrior": Madeline Maxine signs on to escort a convoy.; "Grownies (Just Don't Understand)": Cherry gets a lecture from hypocritical school counsellor Ms. Priss.; "Cherry Does Zara Tungi": Cherry meets Penthouse Hot Talk mascot Zara Tungi. By Mark Bodé.; "Ellie Dee in Cyberland": Ellie's computer transports her to an underground vault in the Vatican City.	
Cherry #10	1990	"The New Guy": Johnny Fuckerfaster tries to get a job at Cherry International.; "Honor Farm Girls": Cherry dreams of being arrested by the Comics Police.; "Rebel without a Hardon": Cherry and Zara go drag-racing. By Mark Bodé.; "Hole in One": Cherry and her mom play golf. Collaboration between Welz and Larry Todd.; "The Cherry Duke Show": Cherry and her near-identical cousin Terry get involved in a farce. Story by Dan Fogel, with art by Welz.	
Cherry #11	1990	"Threedy": Cherry extols the virtues of 3-D.; "Good Ol' Mom": 3-D reprint of strip from Cherry #4.; "Nurse's Aid": 3-D reprint of strip from Cherry #8.; "Cherry Closely Encounters Captain Eeyon": Cherry and Ellie meet the genitally-challenged Captain Eeyon.; "The Love Channel": 3-D reprint of strip from Cherry #5.; "I ♥ My Job": Cherry works the register at Burger Tyrant.; "A Personal Message from Cherry": 3-D reprint of strip from Cherry #2.	3-D issue.
Cherry #12	1991	"Cherry Gets It in the End": Cherry and her mom deal with the changing demands of the pornography industry.; "Sgt. Cherry and Her Squealing Commandos": Cherry, Lola, Patty and Ellie deploy in Iraq. Story by Dan Fogel, with art by Welz.; "Slut du Jour": Patty throws a party.; "Winehigh": Cherry goes on a hot air balloon. By Larry Todd.	
Cherry #13	1992	"Slumber Party from Hell": Cherry, Lola and Ellie experiment with a Ouija board.; "The Curse of Lola": A jealous Lola attempts to use magic to get back at Cherry.; "Cherry Popstar": Cherry gets ready for a gig with her band, the Bimbos from Hell.; "Cherry Meets the Vampire Le Stud": Cherry and Ellie investigate a vampire's mansion.	
Cherry #14	February 1993	"Cherry Does the Time Warp": Cherry is sent back in time to make sure she is born and the future Church of Cherry will come into being. She meets her mother and turns her from a prude into a hedonist. She finds out her father might be one of Captain Guts, George Washington, Davy Crockett, Jesse James or James Dean.	First issue published by Kitchen Sink Press.
Cherry #15	November 1993	"Out in the Woods": Cherry deals with bikers, survivalists, Big Foot and the White Male Elite.; "Motorcycles & Dinosaurs": Ellie creates a time-travelling motorcycle that takes her and Cherry forward to the time of lizard men. Collaboration between Welz and Larry Todd.	
Cherry #16	November 1994	"Cherry Meets the Renaissance Dude": Cherry encounters Luccan the magician.; "Motorcycles & Dinosaurs": Ellie creates a time-travelling motorcycle that takes her and Cherry forward to the time of lizard men. Collaboration between Welz and Larry Todd.	
Cherry #17	April 1995	"Young Genetically-Altered Samurai Lizards": May O'Doul meets the Young Genetically-Altered Samurai Lizards. Collaboration between Welz and Mark Bodé.; "Cherry and the Surf Pirates": Another run-in with Luccan turns Cherry's surfing holiday into a pirate encounter.	
Cherry #18	October 1995	"Cherry has an Anxiety Attack": Cherry fantasises about Mr. Le Mort in her World Lit class and helps school counsellor Ms. Renfrew relax.; "Cherry Dances with Dolphins": Cherry makes a breakthrough in human-dolphin communications.	
Cherry #19	November 1996	"Party Girls, or Festive Women": Cherry and Lola are upstaged by the Boobsie Twins.; "Cherry Does Dick": Cherry has a disappointing encounter with star athlete Dick.	
Cherry #20	March 1999	"The Champion": Cherry and Lola try to teach Monique there's more to life than working out.; "Smells Like Team Spirit": Cherry and fellow cheerleaders Lola, Patty and congratulate the school football team for winning a game.	
Cherry #21	August 1999	"The Businesswomen": Cherry's mom and Ellie's mom tell their daughters they are host a Tubberware™ party with a twist. Story by John Nubbin.; "She's So Excited": Monique helps Cherry get ready for a date. Story by C. J. Henderson.	
Cherry #22	April 2000	"Cherry Has Left the Planet": Cherry is abducted by aliens, and Ellie enlists the help of agents Muledeer and Skuzzy to help find her.	
Cherry #23	November 2019	"Cherrypocalypse": Cherrypocalypse Chapter 1. Cherry returns from outer space.; "Attack of the 50 Ft. Cherry": Cherrypocalypse Chapter 2. Cherry grows to giant size. By Mark Bodé.	
Cherry #24	April 2025	"Cherrypocalypse Chapter 3": Part 3 of the Cherrypocalypse.	

=== Cherry's Jubilee ===
Issue	Date	Contents	Notes
Cherry's Jubilee #1	1992	"Consciousness Rising": Cherry attends an anti-porn seminar. Story by Gerard Jones, art by Larry Welz.; "Double Your Trouble": an accident splits Cherry in two – one brazen, one shy. Story by Jim Pitts, art by Chuck Austen.; "A Fistful of Cherry": Cherry stars in a Spaghetti Western. Story by Dan Fogel, art by Greg Espinoza.; "Cherry Meets Roger Fnord": Cherry meets a sex-crazed time-traveller. By S. E. Mills.	
Cherry's Jubilee #2	1992	"Cherry Meets Octobяiaиa": A powerful, promiscuous Russian arrives to help downtrodden American workers. Story by Dan Fogel, art by Larry Welz.; "Swede Chaser": Cherry takes part in a futuristic car race. By Greg Espinoza.; "Hip-Ocracy": Cherry has an affair with President Clit Billton. Story by Dan Fogel, art by Duke Roosevelt.; "Weird Cherry": Commander Cherry Poptart, Science Officer Ellie Dee, First Officer Gar Hanson and Engineer Maple Handle pilot the USS Star-Tang into uncharted space. Story by Dan Fogel, art by Larry Welz.	Includes a history of Octobriana.
Cherry's Jubilee #3	1993	"The Uncommon XXX-Men vs. The Testosterone Titans": Cherry transports her comic-obsessed boyfriend Ned Mylar into a comics universe in time for the arrival of Orgasmus. Story by Marv Wolfman, art by Larry Welz.; "Tunnel of Luv": Dave takes Cherry to a tunnel of love. By Leslie Sternbergh.; "Hobo Hal Meets Cherry": Cherry and Ellie try to cheer up Hobo Hal. By Grass Green; "Pulp-Chritude": Cherry falls asleep while reading. Story by Dan Fogel, art by Duke Roosevelt.; "A Typical Work Day for the Modern Girl": Cherrie in the world of work. By Molly Kiely.	
Cherry's Jubilee #4	April 1994	"Special Handling": Cherry's mom introduces her to the pleasures of home shopping. Story by Kate Worley, art by Larry Welz.; "Shu!": Cherry tries snake-charming. By Forg.; "The Lil' Meremaid": the story of Cherriel. By Larry Todd.; "Vive la Ooh-la-la": Cherry's mom tells her about her Aunt Cheri, a French Resistance fighter in World War II. Story by Dan Fogel, art by Steven Crompton.; "Cherry Does M*yb*rry": Cherry and her mom get arrested speeding through Mayberry. By Lee Terry and Lew Reid.	

=== Cherry Deluxe ===
Issue	Date	Contents	Notes
Cherry Deluxe #1	August 1998	"The Inkeeper's Soul": An angelic Cherry and demonic Lola compete for a villager's soul. Story by Neil Gaiman, art by Larry Welz.; "Talk Radio": Cherry and her mom set out to cheer up a conservative radio host. Story by Kate Murray, art by Larry Welz.	Also includes Tug & Buster stories by Marc Hempel.

== Reception ==
Amazing Heroes reviewer R. A. Jones listed Cherry as one of the ten best titles of 1986, calling it "depraved, disgusting, pornographic, infantile and utterly lacking in any redeeming value", stating "We all need to be offended once in a while" and praising its lampooning of the "saccharine" Archie comics. However, Adam-Troy Castro disagreed in a later issue, feeling that the satirical content was the singular joke of the art's resemblance to Archie material. She was ranked 82nd in Comics Buyer's Guide's "100 Sexiest Women in Comics" list.

== In other media ==
=== Unmade film adaptations ===
During the late 1980s, Welz made a couple of attempts to make a film version of the series. Initially it was planned as a low-budget pornographic film starring Tammy Monroe as Cherry, but Welz withdrew his co-operation after realizing the production was a generic porno. Instead, Berkeley-based company Magic Lightning Productions planned a Cherry Poptart film in 1990, co-produced by Welz and Charles Webb. This was intended to be R-Rated, and reportedly attracted interest from Columbia Pictures and New Line Cinema. Welz also entered negotiations with an animation studio to make direct-to-video Cherry cartoons. However, none of these versions made it into production.

=== Merchandise ===
Welz has produced t-shirts, posters and cigarette lighters featuring Cherry. In 2022, he linked up with Discordia Merchandising to make a resin figure of Cherry.
