= The Other Change of Hobbit =

Science fiction and fantasy bookstore

- Type: Bookstore
- Industry: bookselling
- Genre: Science fiction Fantasy
- Founded: May 1977
- Founder: Dave Nee; Debbie Notkin; Tom Whitmore
- Headquarters: Berkeley, California
- Area served: San Francisco Bay Area; Internet

The Other Change of Hobbit (sometimes abbreviated TOCOH) is a science fiction and fantasy bookstore, formerly located in Berkeley, California and then El Cerrito; it no longer has a physical location. It was founded in 1977, the same weekend that Star Wars opened. It has been the site of numerous author appearances. The founding partners were science fiction fans Dave Nee, Debbie Notkin, and Tom Whitmore. The store is named after the Hobbits from J.R.R. Tolkien's The Hobbit and The Lord of the Rings.

== History ==
Nee, Notkin, and Whitmore had formed The Portable Bookstore in 1974 to sell books to members of the science fiction fan organization named after the fictional Elves, Leprechauns, Gnomes, and Little Men's Chowder & Marching Society. As they sold books at Westercon in 1976, Sherry Gottlieb, founder of A Change of Hobbit (then in Westwood, later in Santa Monica, California), suggested that they open a store in Berkeley. Gottlieb's store was known in fandom for its events—such as hosting Harlan Ellison in its window, writing a story—and Gottlieb offered the store's name to her Berkeley colleagues, so long as it was a little different.

The store opened in a retail arcade off Telegraph Avenue in May 1977, the same weekend that Star Wars opened in theatres. The store moved to Downtown Berkeley in 1993, at 2020 Shattuck near Addison. The Shattuck Avenue store, operated from April 1993 to April 2010, was in a three-story building built around 1905. The second floor, known to the staff as Shelob's lair, was the store office. The main street level was the bookstore and Nee's toy collection. Downstairs in the basement storage were thousands more books. The store window displayed Poul Anderson's typewriter and desk, donated by his wife, Karen Anderson, after Poul's death in 2001. For several years, the window also held Whitmore's Hugo Award for co-chairing Worldcon in 2001.

Notkin dropped out of the partnership in 1994, a year after the store moved to Shattuck Avenue, and Jan Murphy entered the partnership. Whitmore has since also left the partnership.

The store set up a website in January 1995, one of the earliest science fiction/fantasy websites in existence.

The store struggled financially during the economic downturns of the early third millennium, and Nee cited the closing of Alameda Air Station as an additional economic impact on local bookstores. Nee noted the general decline of bookstores in the Berkeley area over the decades: "In 1977, Berkeley had the heaviest density of booksellers in the world—except maybe London! In those days—within three miles of campus. We've watched it all disappear." In 2008, the Bay Area still supported three separate science fiction and fantasy bookstores.

In early 2010, The Other Change of Hobbit received an eviction notice, as the building at 2020 Shattuck had been sold, and the new owners hoped to put a restaurant in the space. In April 2010, the store relocated to a large, single-story building at 3264 Adeline Street. Fantasy writer Peter S. Beagle put together a series of benefit sales, of works related to his novel The Last Unicorn, the film version, and a work by Avram Davidson, to help with the finances of the move.

The store reported receiving an eviction notice in 2013, and relocated again, this time to a site on Kearney Street in El Cerrito.

As of July 16, 2014, the store has vacated the Kearney Street address.

Dave Nee died in August 2026.
