= Cheech Wizard =

- Cheech Wizard, in a characteristic discussion of the search for God; art by Vaughn Bodé.

Publication information
- Publisher: National Lampoon, Last Gasp, Fantagraphics
- First appearance: 1967
- Created by: Vaughn Bodé

In-story information
- Alter ego: unknown
- Partnerships: The Lizard Apprentice

Cheech Wizard is an American underground comics character created by artist Vaughn Bodē. Vaughn created Cheech Wizard on September 26, 1957, at the age of 15. He drew a hat with stars on it with legs sprouting out from beneath the oversized hat. Vaughn spotted a can of Cheechie Nuts on his kitchen table and named the character after the brand. In 1964, Vaughn furthered the character and did an unpublished strip in his journal. In 1967, Cheech appeared in a small self-published black and white comic. The Collected Cheech Wizard was published as a comic by Company and Sons in 1972 (2nd Printing 1976). In 1973, Last Gasp publishers issued the new comic Cheech Wizard Suck my Turnip. From 1972 to 1975, the strips also appeared in National Lampoon. It is said no one knows who is under the hat; however, Vaughn confided in his son Mark (also an artist) that Cheech Wizard was his creator's alter ego and his son Mark was the Lizard apprentice. To look or discover who is under the hat was to look the creator in the eye and would render the viewer forever blind. The Wizard is a bad mouthing, broad balling, fake of a wizard who often is found kicking his Lizard apprentice in the balls on more than one occasion. Cheech Wizard calls it the time distortion trick. The Cheech Wizard has often been copied in graffiti art, and has been referenced in pop music, as in "Mistadobalina" by Del the Funky Homosapien and "Sure Shot" by The Beastie Boys.

== Publication history ==
Though the character was, according to Bodē, created in 1957, Cheech did not appear in print until April 1966 in a small self published black-and-white comic and the "Daily Orange" Syracuse University newspaper with the initial story "Race to the Moon", when he appeared in various publications being produced by the counterculture developing around the Syracuse University campus (where Bodē was attending school).

Cheech Wizard stories ran in the "Funny Pages" of National Lampoon magazine in almost every issue from 1972 to 1975.

The first Cheech Wizard collection was published in 1972 by the San Francisco-based underground publisher Company & Sons. Print Mint and Last Gasp and Rip Off Press. All the Cheech Wizard stories were later collected and reprinted in two volumes by Fantagraphics Books.

Cheech Wizard was revived by Bodē's son Mark Bodé in The Lizard of Oz (Fantagraphics, 2004), a send-up of The Wizard of Oz based on an original concept by Vaughn Bodē.

== Character appearance and personality ==
The Wizard wears a very large yellow Phrygian cap decorated with wizard symbols instead of a wizard's pointed hat, with his legs, clad in what appear to be red tights, visible underneath. His appearance and species have never been revealed. In an early comic, Captured by Morton Frog (1967), Cheech takes off his hat for a police officer, a priest and a political leader. He holds his hat in his hands, away from the rest of his body. The face is hidden by the speech balloon, but there are glimpses of hair on top. All three persons witnessing his face fall into cataleptic states forever. Cheech walks away from their fortress claiming that "their primitive minds couldn't accept da truth". In a later comic, Who is C.W.? (1974), one of Cheech's lovers insists on seeing his true face. Cheech claims that she will die instantly, or go insane. After having her sign a waiver freeing him of legal responsibilities, he agrees to take off his hat. The comic ends abruptly at mid-page with Cheech saying "Okay! Here goes, but I bet you go blind!", followed by a blank (white-out) panel.

Cheech Wizard speaks in an ungrammatical sort of urban dialect. He was generally accompanied by his lizard apprentice, Razzberry. Cheech was depicted as foul-mouthed, often drunk or high on drugs, and constantly on the make. His attitude towards his fellow residents of the magic forest in which he lived was usually one of contempt. His general reaction to anyone who annoys him is to deliver a swift kick to the groin. Mark Bodé claims that the Cheech Wizard was his father's "alter-ego, . . . a bad-mouth hat with no respect for anyone, completely the opposite of Vaughn, who was charismatic but shy".

== In popular culture ==
- In 2007, Puma released a limited-edition shoe and matching hoodie inspired by Cheech Wizard (and designed by Mark Bodé).
- The Beastie Boys songs "The Sounds of Science", from their 1989 album Paul's Boutique; and "Sure Shot", from their 1994 album Ill Communication reference Cheech Wizard.
- Aesop Rock references Bode's Cheech Wizard in his song "Fast Cars" off of the album Fast Cars, Danger, Fire And Knives: "It's A-E-S-O-P-R-O-C-K, the peak twister. Defender of the son of Vaughn Bodé's Cheech Wizard". Another reference appears on "TUFF" from the album The Impossible Kid: "I pay a guy to lean over steepled fingers And convince me to pay him for his teas and tinctures The string cheese dinner kid speak Cheech Wizard For the gone like Gossamer under number 3 clippers".
- Bundy K. Brown references Cheech Wizard in his song "Attention Span Deficit Disorder Disruption" from the 1989 album Post-Global Music.

== Bibliography ==
- The Collected Cheech Wizard (Company & Sons, 1972) — later printings by the Print Mint
- Cheech Wizard, Schizophrenia #1 — Suck My Turnip (Last Gasp, 1973) ASIN B006TODEAE
- Deadbone: the First Testament of Cheech Wizard, the Cartoon Messiah (Northern Comfort Communications, 1975) ISBN 0969050607
- Vaughn Bodé's Cheech Wizard (Northern Comfort Communications, 1976) ISBN 0969050623
- The Complete Cheech Wizard vols. 1-3 (Rip Off Press, 1986)
- Cheech Wizard vol. 1 (Fantagraphics, 1990) ISBN 1560970421
- Cheech Wizard vol. 2 (Fantagraphics, 1991) ASIN B009FQ4TGG
- The Lizard of Oz (Fantagraphics, 2004) ISBN 978-1560975953
