= Cobalt 60 (comics) =

Publication information
- Publisher: Shangri L'Affaires (Shaggy); Epic Illustrated (Marvel Comics); Tundra Publishing; Heavy Metal
- First appearance: Shangri L'Affaires #73 (April 1968)
- Created by: Vaughn Bodē

In-story information
- Species: Human
- Place of origin: Earth
Cobalt 60
- Cover of the 1988 Cobalt 60 Starblaze Graphics book collection. Art by Mark Bodé.
Publication information
- Schedule: (Epic Illustrated) Bimonthly (Tundra) Monthly
- Format: Limited series
- Genre: Apocalyptic science fiction
- Publication date: Dec. 1984 – May 1992
- No. of issues: (Epic Illustrated): 5 (Tundra): 4
- Main character(s): Cobalt 60
Creative team
- Written by: Vaughn Bodē, Larry Todd
- Artist(s): Vaughn Bodē, Mark Bodé
- Letterer(s): Vaughn Bodē, Mark Bodé
- Colorist(s): Mark Bodé
Collected editions
- Cobalt 60: ISBN 978-0898656770

Cobalt 60 is a science fiction comics series created by underground cartoonist Vaughn Bodē. After appearing in one story in 1968, the character lay dormant for almost 20 years. In 1984, Cobalt 60 was revived by Vaughn Bodē's son Mark Bodé and writer Larry Todd.

== Publication history ==
Vaughn Bodē reputedly first drew the character Cobalt 60 on a piece of scratch paper in 1959. Nearly ten years later, in 1968, he wrote and drew a ten-page, black-and-white, pen-and-ink Cobalt 60 story for Ken Rudolph's sci-fi fanzine Shangri L'Affaires (a.k.a. Shaggy) #73. The story did not expound much on the character, instead concentrating on action and a thorough depiction of the story's setting. Bodē wrote a prose follow-up of the story, with pencil illustrations, for Shaggy #74. Bodē won the 1969 Hugo Award for Best Fanzine Artist largely on the strength of Cobalt 60. In addition, the initial ten-page story was later republished in Witzend #7 (April 1970), in the Franco-Belgian comics magazine Metal Hurlant in 1980, and in Epic Illustrated #27 (Dec. 1984).

Although Bodē had created a cast of characters with whom he could populate a more involved story, he never did anything else with the material. (His son Mark Bodé said the project had made him too depressed.)

In 1984, Cobalt 60 was revived via full-color art by Mark Bodé and a story scripted by Larry Todd (a former friend and collaborator of Vaughn Bodē's from the 1960s). These latter-day Cobalt 60 stories were serialized in the magazine Epic Illustrated starting with the December 1984 issue. Although the story included all of Vaughn Bodé's original elements, Mark Bodé said the finished product was more "lighthearted" than what he felt his father would have done.

In 1988, The Donning Company/Starblaze Graphics published a 1988 Cobalt 60 book collection. The separate episodes were later gathered in four magazine-sized comics published in 1992 by Tundra Press.

An additional Cobalt 60 episode by Todd and Mark Bodé, titled "Da Dust Devil," appeared in Heavy Metal Overdrive (a Heavy Metal Special) vol. 9, #1 (1995).

== Plot ==
Cobalt 60 takes place in a post-apocalyptic, Mad Max-like world inhabited by mutants, aliens, and other fantastic creatures. Its titular character embarks on a quest to avenge the death of his parents, murdered by the evil Strontium 90. After he succeeds in his quest, he inherits his father's kingdom, but prefers to return to his wild ways. Cobalt 60 is very violent and quite graphic in its action scenes.

== Characters ==
- Cobalt 60 — carries a high-caliber carbine sniper rifle, a short revolver, and a trench knife
- Strontium 90 — evil murderer who killed Cobalt 60's parents
- Franklin Gothic Green
- General History
- Cordwainer Bigeye
- Radio-men — Cobalt 60's enemies, they are technologically advanced and carry superior firepower, but lack the brutal skills for hand-to-hand combat. They instead rely upon larger mutants called Lopers.

== Influence ==
The visual style of Ralph Bakshi's 1977 animated film Wizards is heavily indebted to Cobalt 60 and other works by Vaughn Bodē.

== Film adaptation ==
On October 25, 2006, The Hollywood Reporter announced that Universal Pictures had acquired the rights to adapt Cobalt 60 into a film with director Zack Snyder attached to the project. The director and Debbie Snyder were also set to produce the film.
