= Larry Welz =

American cartoonist

- Born: November 21, 1948 (age 78) Bakersfield, California, U.S.
- Areas: Cartoonist, writer, editor
- Notable works: Cherry, Captain Guts
- Collaborators: Marvin Gardens
- Spouse: Sharon Welz

Lawrence Edward Welz (born November 21, 1948) is an American cartoonist who created Cherry Poptart (now known simply as Cherry). He was an early contributor to the underground comix movement in the San Francisco area during the late 1960s and early 1970s. He graduated from Bakersfield High School.

== Work ==
From 1969 to 1970, his work appeared regularly in Yellow Dog, a comics anthology published by the Print Mint in Berkeley, California. He also contributed to San Francisco Comic Book, Captain Guts, Funnybook, Bakersfield Kountry Komics, American Flyer Funnies, and Good Eatin' Comix.

In the early 1980s, Welz created Cherry Poptart, a character who evolved from stories in Funnybook and Bakersfield Kountry Komics. Cherry quickly became his most successful and well-known comic book series, with 24 issues and a variety of collections, posters, stickers and tattoos.

Welz has collaborated with several other well-known artists and authors on comic books and other projects over the years, including Mark Bodé, Neil Gaiman, and Larry Todd.

After many years in the San Francisco Bay Area, Welz and his wife Sharon moved to Roswell, New Mexico, and then to Albuquerque, where he continues his involvement in both comics and commercial artwork. In 2006, he drew the cover for Jeff Walker's album Welcome to Carcass Cuntry. In 2016, he drew the front and back covers for Marvin Gardens' album 1968, and contributed an original cartoon to the liner notes.
