= Vaughn Bodē =

American underground cartoonist and illustrator (1941–1975)

- Born: July 22, 1941 Utica, New York, U.S.
- Died: July 18, 1975 (aged 33) San Francisco, California, U.S.
- Area: Cartoonist
- Notable works: Cheech Wizard
- Awards: Hugo Award for Best Fan Artist, 1969; Yellow Kid Award, 1974; Will Eisner Award Hall of Fame, 2006
- Spouse: Barbara Hawkins (m. 1961; div. 1972)
- Children: Mark Bodé

Vaughn Bodē (/boʊˈdiː/; (Note: As explained by Bodē's friend Fred A. Levy Haskell, in the collection Vaughn Bodē's Poem Toons (Tundra Publishing, 1989, ISBN 1-879450-39-9),"the line over the 'e' in Vaughn's signature is not an acute accent, it is a long mark. That is, it was not part of the family name, and is not pronounced as if it were a long 'a'—he added it to his signature to indicate that you are supposed to pronounce the long 'e' at the end of his name.") July 22, 1941 – July 18, 1975) was an American underground cartoonist and illustrator known for his character Cheech Wizard and his artwork depicting voluptuous women. A contemporary of Ralph Bakshi, Bodē has been credited as an influence on Bakshi's animated films Wizards and The Lord of the Rings. Bodē has a huge following among graffiti artists, with his characters remaining a popular subject.

Bodē was inducted into the Will Eisner Award Hall of Fame for comics artists in 2006.

== Career ==
He was born Vaughn Bode on July 22, 1941.

In 1963, at age 21, and while living in Utica, New York, Bodē self-published Das Kämpf, considered one of the first underground comic books. Created after Bodē's stint in the U.S. Army, Das Kampf has been called "a war-themed spoof on Charles Schulz's 1962 book Happiness Is a Warm Puppy." With money borrowed from his brother Vincent, Bodē photocopied about 100 copies of the 52-page book and (mostly unsuccessfully) attempted to sell it around the Utica area.

In the mid 1960s Bodē was living in Syracuse, New York, attending classes at Syracuse University and contributing to The Sword of Damocles, a student-run, though not university-sanctioned, humor magazine similar to The Harvard Lampoon. It was here that Bodē's most famous comic creation, Cheech Wizard, first saw publication. Cheech Wizard (sometimes characterized as a "cartoon messiah") is a wizard whose large yellow hat (decorated with black and red stars) covers his entire body except his legs and his big red feet. Cheech Wizard is constantly in search of a good party, cold beer, and attractive women. Usually depicted without arms, it is never actually revealed what Cheech Wizard looks like under the hat, or exactly what kind of creature he is, although in the episode entitled "The Unmasking of Cheech Wizard", when he "doffs the hat", it is evident that underneath was a low-rent Oz man all along (in an interview, reference is made to the frontal lump in the hat caused by crossed arms). Characters pressing the issue generally are rewarded with a swift kick to the groin by Cheech. After an initial run in The Sword of Damocles, the strip continued for a few more years in The Daily Orange, the student-written newspaper at Syracuse University.

In 1968, Bodē illustrated the cover & interior art for R. A. Lafferty's science fiction novel Space Chantey, published by Ace Double. In the late 1960s and early 1970s, he illustrated covers and interior art for the science fiction digests Amazing Stories, Fantastic, Galaxy Science Fiction, Witzend and Worlds of If.

Discovered by fellow cartoonist Trina Robbins, Bodē moved to Manhattan in 1969 and joined the staff of the underground newspaper the East Village Other. It was here that Bodē met Spain Rodriguez, Robert Crumb and other founders of the quickly expanding underground comics world. At the East Village Other, he helped found Gothic Blimp Works, an underground comics supplement to the magazine, which ran for eight issues, the first two edited by Bodē.

Bodē's post-apocalyptic science fiction action series Cobalt 60 featured an antihero wandering a devastated post-nuclear land, seeking to avenge the murder of his parents. Cobalt-60 debuted as a ten-page black-and-white story in the science fiction fanzine Shangri L'Affaires (a.k.a. Shaggy) #73, published in 1968. Bodē won the 1969 Hugo Award for Best Fan Artist largely on the strength of Cobalt 60, but he never did anything else with the character. (Cobalt-60 was later "completed" in the early 1980s by Bodē's son Mark Bodé, with stories by Larry Todd, who was Vaughn's friend and collaborator in the 1960s on projects for Eerie, Creepy, and Vampirella magazines.)

Beginning in 1968 and continuing until his death, Bodē entered a period of creativity, introducing a number of strips and ongoing series, most of which ran in underground newspapers or erotic magazines:

- Bodē's strip War Lizards, a look at the Vietnam War from the hostile stance of the period's counterculture, was told with anthropomorphic reptiles instead of people. It ran sporadically in the East Village Other, Witzend, Pig Society, and Bodē's own Junkwaffel from 1969–1972.
- Bodē's comic strip Deadbone, about the adventures of the inhabitants of a solitary mountain a billion years in the past, ran in the men's magazine Cavalier from 1969–1975. Originally in black-and-white, when colored the strip changed its title to Deadbone Erotica and later simply to Erotica.
- Episodes of Cheech Wizard ran in the "Funny Pages" of National Lampoon magazine in almost every issue from 1971 to 1975.
- Bodē's black-and-white science fiction parody Sunpot appeared in Galaxy Science Fiction in the early 1970s. (It was later republished, in color, in Heavy Metal.)
- Bodē's monthly comic strip feature Purple Pictography ran in Swank magazine in 1971–1972. (Bernie Wrightson did the painted art for five of Purple Pictography episodes based on Bodē's scripts and rough layouts.)

Print Mint published four issues of Bodē's solo series Junkwaffel from 1971 to 1974. Bodē's graphic novel The Man, published by Print Mint in 1972, is about a caveman who accidentally makes important observations about life.

=== Cartoon Concert tour ===
Beginning in 1972, Bodē toured with a show called the "Cartoon Concert", that featured him vocalizing his characters while their depictions were presented on a screen behind him via a slide projector (in a performance similar to a chalk talk). The first of these "Cartoon Concerts" was presented in October 1972 at the Detroit Triple Fan Fair in front of 80 people. He next did the Concert at Bowling Green State University, and eventually performed it at several comic book conventions, including the November 1972 Creation Con in New York City. Observing the crowd reaction, The Bantam Lecture Bureau immediately signed him on, and the show became very popular on the college lecture circuit. Bodē even performed it at the Louvre, in Paris.

== Personal life ==
=== Early life ===
Bodē was born in Utica, New York, the son of Kenneth and Elsie Bodé. Vaughn was one of four children, including his older brother Victor and younger siblings Vincent and Valerie. Vaughn's father was an alcoholic; he started drawing as a way of escaping a less-than-happy childhood. Bodē's parents divorced when he was around ten years old, and he was sent to live with an uncle near Washington, D.C.

After joining the Army at age 19, Bodē went AWOL but later received an honorable discharge due to a psychiatric diagnosis.

Bodē married Barbara Hawkins at age 20 in 1961. Their son Mark was born in 1963. Barbara divorced Bodē in 1972, and he moved to San Francisco in 1973 (with some of his underground contemporaries, including Robbins and Spain).

=== Sexuality ===
Around 1970–1971, conversations with the guru Prem Rawat and fellow cartoonist Jeffrey Catherine Jones (with whom Bodē shared a studio in Woodstock, New York) led Bodē to cross-dressing, transvestism, and even a short-lived experiment with female hormones. Bodē described his sexuality as "auto-sexual, heterosexual, homosexual, mano-sexual, sado-sexual, trans-sexual, uni-sexual, omni-sexual."

=== Death ===
Bodē's death was due to autoerotic asphyxiation. His last words were to his son: "No phone calls today Mark, I’m doing my god thing." When Mark remarked how beautiful Vaughn looked, Vaughn replied, "You see, Mark, I really am a high priest." Thirty-three years old at the time of his death, Bodē's ashes were dropped from a Cessna airplane over the waters off the coast of Point Reyes.

He left behind a library of sketchbooks, journals, finished and unfinished works, paintings, and comic strips. Most of his art has since been published in a variety of collections, mostly from Fantagraphics.

== Influence ==
Bodē was a friend of animator Ralph Bakshi, and warned him against working with Robert Crumb on the animated film adaptation of Crumb's strip Fritz the Cat. Bodē has been credited as an influence on Bakshi's films Wizards and The Lord of the Rings.

Bodē has a huge following among graffiti artists and his work can often be seen replicated in the world of street art. As the original New York graffiti train writers (such as DONDI) chose to replicate his characters, images from his work have remained popular throughout the history of graffiti.

His son Mark Bodé is also an artist, producing works similar to the elder Bodē's style, and further cementing his father's legacy. In 2004, Mark completed one of his father's unfinished works, The Lizard of Oz, a send-up of The Wizard of Oz, starring Cheech Wizard one more time.

== Awards ==
The Hugo Award for Best Fan Artist was bestowed upon him in 1969, and he was nominated for Best Professional Artist the following year. He also won the Yellow Kid Award, awarded by the International Congress of Cartoonists and Animators at the Italian Lucca comics festival, in 1974. He was a finalist for induction into the Eisner Hall of Fame in 1998 and 2002, before finally being inducted in 2006. He was awarded the Inkpot Award in 1975.

== Bibliography ==
- Das Kämpf (self-published, 1963)—re-issued in 1977 by Walter Bachner and Bagginer Productions with paste-up, layout, and lettering by Larry Todd)
- The Man (Office of Student Publications Syracuse University, may 1966; reprinted by The Print Mint, 1972)
- Deadbone/Deadbone Erotica/Erotica (Cavalier, May 1969–August 1975 [with the exception of April 1975])
- Sunpot (Galaxy Science Fiction, February–May 1970/republished in color in Heavy Metal, April–July 1977)
- Purple Pictography (Swank, August 1971–April 1972)—monthly comic strip feature with Bernie Wrightson
- Cheech Wizard (National Lampoon, 1971–1975)—monthly feature
- Junkwaffel (4 issues, Print Mint, 1971–1974)—final issue, #5, published by Last Gasp (publisher), and includes some reprints from the first four issues
- Schizophrenia (Last Gasp, 1973)
- The Bodē Broads (Bagginer Press, 1977)

=== Collected works ===
From 1988 to 2001, Fantagraphics published a 14-volume series of Vaughn Bodē work titled The Bodē Library.

- Vaughn Bodē's Erotica vol. 2, 1988, Fantagraphics (Seattle), 48 pages ISBN 978-0930193553
- Deadbone, 1989, Fantagraphics (Seattle), 64 pages ISBN 978-0930193980
- Cheech Wizard vol. 1, 1990 Fantagraphics (Seattle), 68 pages ISBN 978-1560970422
- Vaughn Bodē Diary Sketchbook #1, 1990, Fantagraphics (Seattle), 64 pages ISBN 978-1560970286
- Vaughn Bodē Diary Sketchbook #2, 1990, Fantagraphics (Seattle), 64 pages ISBN 978-1560970446
- Vaughn Bodē Diary Sketchbook #3, 1991, Fantagraphics (Seattle), 64 pages ISBN 978-1560970538
- Cheech Wizard vol. 2, 1991, Fantagraphics (Seattle), 68 pages ISBN 978-1560970545
- Junkwaffel vol. 1, 1993, Fantagraphics (Seattle), 84 pages ISBN 978-1560970866
- Junkwaffel vol. 2, 1995, Fantagraphics (Seattle), 80 pages ISBN 978-1560971108
- Vaughn Bodē's Erotica vol. 1, 1996, Fantagraphics (Seattle), 48 pages ISBN 978-1560973072. Note, this reprints the 1983 edition published by Last Gasp (publisher).
- Vaughn Bodē's Erotica vol. 3, 1997, Fantagraphics (Seattle), 48 pages ISBN 978-1560972679
- Vaughn Bodē's Erotica vol. 4, 1997, Fantagraphics (Seattle), 56 pages ISBN 978-1560972839
- Lizard Zen, 1998, Fantagraphics (Seattle), 48 pages ISBN 978-1560973096
- Schizophrenia, 2001, Fantagraphics (Seattle), 138 pages ISBN 978-1560973713

Other collected material:

- Sunpot (Stellar Productions, 1971)
- The Collected Cheech Wizard (Company & Sons, 1972)
- Bodē's Cartoon Concert (Dell, 1973)—collects material from Cavalier Magazine
- Orange Bode: Vaughn Bode At Syracuse's Daily Orange - An Annotated Catalog (Bob Coughlin/Chimneysweep Nostalgia Co., 1978); 160pp.
- The Complete Cheech Wizard, #1–4 (Rip Off Press, 1986–1987)
- Poem-Toons (Kitchen Sink Press/Tundra Publishing, 1989)
- The Collected Purple Pictography (Eros Comix, 1991)
- Cobalt 60 Book One (Tundra Publishing, 1992)—created by Vaughn Bodē, illustrated by Mark Bodé, written by Larry Todd. ISBN 1-879450-35-6
- Cobalt 60 Book Two (Tundra Publishing, 1992)—created by Vaughn Bodē, illustrated by Mark Bodé, written by Larry Todd. ISBN 1-879450-35-6
- Cobalt 60 Book Three (Tundra Publishing, 1992)—created by Vaughn Bodē, illustrated by Mark Bodé, written by Larry Todd. ISBN 1-879450-35-6
- Cobalt 60 Book Four (Tundra Publishing, 1992)—created by Vaughn Bodē, illustrated by Mark Bodé, written by Larry Todd. ISBN 1-879450-35-6
- Vaughn Bode: Rare And Well Done (Pure Imagination, 2004)—fanzine and small press work
