= Larry Todd =

American underground cartoonist and illustrator

- Born: Larry S. Todd; 6 April 1948 Buffalo, New York, U.S.
- Died: 28 September 2024 (aged 76)
- Areas: Cartoonist, Writer, Artist
- Pseudonym: Lou P. de Loupe
- Notable works: Dr. Atomic
- Collaborators: Vaughn Bodé, Mark Bodé, Larry Welz

Larry S. Todd (April 6, 1948 – September 28, 2024) was an American illustrator and cartoonist, best known for Dr. Atomic and his other work in underground comix, often with a science fiction bent.

== Biography ==
Born in Buffalo, Todd studied art at Syracuse University where he crossed paths with Vaughn Bodé; the two became friends and collaborators. Todd created comics for Galaxy Science Fiction, as well as doing some writing for the science fiction magazine If. Todd later collaborated with Bodé on a series of cover paintings for Galaxy and magazines published by Warren Publishing.

=== Dr. Atomic ===
After a brief period in New York, Todd moved in 1971 to San Francisco, where he created Dr. Atomic, initially for John Bryan's short-lived Sunday Paper and then as a comic book series published by Last Gasp. Comics historian Don Markstein described Dr. Atomic:

He first appeared in some of the transient underground newspapers of the early 1970s, where his first task was to build his robot assistant. . . . The character's back story included having been a lieutenant in the Luftwaffe in 1941, which would make him a good deal older than most of his 20-something readers. (Another clue was his bald head and thick, white beard.) Still, he had more in common with Billy Kropotkin, the dope-smoking hippie next door, than with Hank the heavily armed redneck next door on the other side. Billy and Dr. Atomic had one drug-addled sci-fi adventure after another, for six issues. The last came out in 1981. There were also T-shirts and suchlike—no lunch boxes or Underoos, of course, but one spun-off product was absolutely unique. Dr. Atomic's Marijuana Multiplier, which was published in 1974, provided instructions for a chemical process that allegedly enhanced cheap, low-quality pot. The chemicals are said by others to have been fairly dangerous if handled by non-professionals. Nonetheless, people bought a great many copies, and it is still in print.

=== Other work ===
Todd's first solo title was Tales of the Armorkins, published by Company & Sons in 1971. In 1972, Todd and Charles Dallas created Paranoia (also published by Company & Sons). Todd and a collective of other cartoonists self-published Compost Comics and Enigma! in 1973.

Some time in the early 1970s, along with Willy Murphy and Gary King, Todd began hanging around the Air Pirates collective and contributing to their projects.

Todd contributed gag cartoons to the men's magazine Coq in 1977.

In 1978, Last Gasp published Harlan Ellison's Chocolate Alphabet, illustrated by Todd.

It's a Dog's Life, a one-shot published by Last Gasp in 1982, was a futuristic tale of dogs with human heads; it included reprints of stories from previous comics.

Beginning in 1984, Todd and Vaughn Bodé's son Mark Bodé collaborated on Cobalt 60, the revival of a concept created by Vaughn Bodé. These latter-day Cobalt 60 stories were serialized in the magazine Epic Illustrated starting with the December 1984 issue, and later collected in various forms by The Donning Company/Starblaze Graphics and Tundra Press.

Todd continued his relationship with Mark Bodé by co-scripting a couple of issues of Rip Off Press's Miami Mice in 1986, and co-creating/scripting Gyro Force in 1987.

Todd contributed a story to Larry Welz's Cherry Poptart #1 in 1982; from 1990 to 1994, Todd contributed stories and art to various issues of Cherry.

== Personal life ==
In 1989 Todd's house burned down. Spurred on by Mark Bodé, more than 35 of Todd's colleagues contributed to a benefit comic book. Published by Rip Off Press, the introduction was by Harlan Ellison; contributors included Bodé, Spain Rodriguez, Justin Green, Trina Robbins, S. Clay Wilson, Jaxon, Richard Corben, Peter Bagge, Dan O'Neill, Sheridan Anderson, Gary Hallgren, Jay Kinney, Paul Mavrides, Sharon Rudahl, William Messner-Loebs, Steve Leialoha, Scott Shaw, Jim Valentino, Michael T. Gilbert, Kevin Eastman, George Metzger, Harry S. Robins, Guy Colwell, William Stout, Kate Worley, Reed Waller, Larry Welz, and R. L. Crabb.

In 2010, Larry Welz reported that Todd was working for Duncan Designs Inc. of Santa Rosa, California, "painting carnival rides: funhouses, mirror mazes & dark rides at Owen Trailers in Riverside, California, where they build such things."

Todd was married with one child. He died on September 28, 2024.

== Bibliography ==
=== Creator series ===
- Tales of the Armorkins (Company & Sons, 1971)
- Paranoia (Company & Sons, 1972) — with Charles Dallas; includes Robert Silverberg and Todd's "Passengers"
- Dr. Atomic (Last Gasp, Sept. 1972–Apr. 1981)
- Compost Comics (self-published 1973) — with George Metzger, Tom P. Gasparotti, R. T. Reece, and Hector Tellez
- Enigma! (self-published 1973) — with Tom P. Gasparotti, R. T. Reece, and Hector Tellez
- Dr. Atomic's Marijuana Multiplier (self-published, 1974; later republished by Ronin Publishing)
- Harlan Ellison's Chocolate Alphabet (Last Gasp, 1978) — illustrated by Todd
- It's a Dog's Life (Last Gasp, 1982)
- Cobalt 60 (Epic Illustrated, Dec. 1984 – Aug. 1985) — collaboration with Vaughn Bodé's son Mark Bodé; later reprinted in 1988 by The Donning Company/Starblaze Graphics as Cobalt 60 book collection; later gathered in four magazine-sized comics in 1992 by Tundra Press
- Gyro Force (Rip Off Press, 1987) — story by Todd, art by Mark Bodé

=== Stories elsewhere ===
- "The Warbots" in Galaxy Science Fiction, October 1968)
- "Spacial Delivery" in Creepy #42 (Warren Publishing, Nov. 1971) — story by R. Michael Rosen
- "Broken Sparrow," in Nightmare #6 (Skywald Publications, Dec. 1971)
- "Shadow From the Abyss" in Skull Comics #5 (Last Gasp, Aug. 1972) — adaptation of H. P. Lovecraft's "The Shadow Out of Time"
- "Passengers" in Paranoia (Company & Sons, 1972) — story by Robert Silverberg
- "Crypts of the Moon," in Enigma! (self-published, 1973)
- "Dr. Atomic and His Chickenmobile," in Compost Comics (self-published, Winter 1973)
- "The Curse of the Abominable Snowmobile" in Brain Fantasy #2 (Last Gasp, 1974) — also cover
- "Dog of a Man" in Brain Fantasy #2 (Last Gasp, 1974)
- "The Wreck of the Ship John B.," in Psychotic Adventures #3 (Last Gasp, 1974)
- "The Grimey Slimey Monster of Rottenberry Swamp," in The Barn of Fear #1 (Comic Art Gallery, Oct. 1977)
- "Lucky Dog" in Fear and Laughter (Krupp Comic Works, 1977)
- "Kepone" in Corporate Crime Comics #2 (Kitchen Sink, 1979)
- "Vampironica" in Cherry Poptart #1 (Last Gasp, 1982)
- "Pie in Der' Sky," in Miami Mice #3 (Rip Off Press, Oct. 1986) — story co-written by Todd with Mark Bodé
- "Requiem For Tha' Mice" in Miami Mice #4 (Rip Off Press, Jan. 1987) — story co-written by Todd with Mark Bodé
- "Fire Sale," in Fire Sale (Rip Off Press, 1989)
- "Mad Maxine the Road Worrier!" in Cherry #9 (Last Gasp, 1990)
- "Hole in One" in Cherry #10 (Last Gasp, 1990) — by Todd & Larry Welz
- "Cherry does the Time Warp" in Cherry #14 (Last Gasp, Feb. 1993) — "inking assistance" by Todd
- "The Renaissance Dude" in Cherry #16 (Last Gasp, Nov. 1994) — written by Larry Welz, Kate Worley, and Todd; with additional dialogue by William Shakespeare; art by Welz & Todd

=== Illustration work ===
- The Book of Acid by Adam Gottlieb (Kistone Press, 1975) — cover and illustrations by Todd
- Aurelia by R. A. Lafferty (Wadsworth Publishing Company, 1983)
- The Common Sense Guide to Good Sex by Suellen Ocean and Jon Hose (Ocean Hose, 1996)
