= Marvin Gardens (band) =

Former American Folk-Rock band

- Origin: San Francisco, California, U.S.
- Genres: Folk rock, folk music
- Years active: 1960s
- Label: High Moon Records
- Formerly of: Carol Duke

Marvin Gardens was an American folk-rock band from San Francisco, active during the late 1960s. Lead singer Carol Duke was active in the emerging gay community in San Francisco and the band's song "Whips and Leathers" was popular in the city's gay and lesbian biker bars and clubs.

In 2016, a compilation album, titled 1968, was released on High Moon Records. The release includes liner notes by Mike Stax, publisher of Ugly Things magazine, and artwork by American cartoonist Larry Welz.
