= Danse Macabre (King book) =

1981 nonfiction book by Stephen King

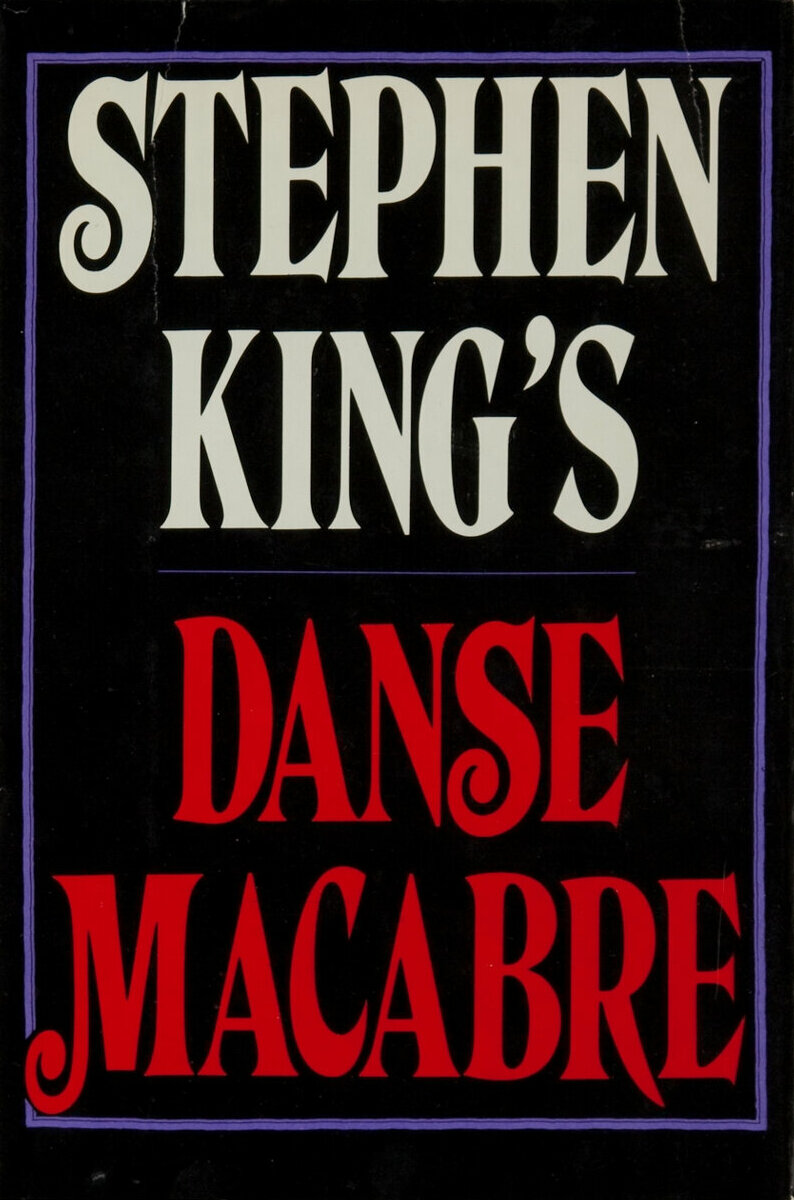
- First edition cover
- Author: Stephen King
- Language: English
- Subject: Horror fiction
- Publisher: Everest House
- Publication date: April 20, 1981
- Publication place: United States
- Media type: Print (Hardcover and Paperback)
- Pages: 400
- ISBN: 978-0-89696-076-3
- Followed by: Nightmares in the Sky

Danse Macabre is a 1981 non-fiction book by Stephen King, about horror fiction in print, TV, radio, film and comics, and the influence of contemporary societal fears and anxieties on the genre. When the book was republished King included a new Forenote dated June 1983 (however not all subsequent editions have included this forenote). And when the book was republished on February 23, 2010, it included an additional new forenote in the form of a longer essay (7,700 words) entitled "What's Scary".

Danse Macabre examines the various influences on King's own writing, and important genre texts of the 19th and 20th centuries. Danse Macabre explores the history of the genre as far back as the Victorian era, but primarily focuses on the 1950s to the 1970s (roughly the era covering King's own life at the time of publication). King peppers his book with informal academic insight, discussing archetypes, important authors, common narrative devices, "the psychology of terror", and his key theory of "Dionysian horror".

King's novel The Stand was published in Spanish as La danza de la muerte 'The Dance of Death', which caused some confusion between the two books. (A later Spanish edition of this novel was titled Apocalipsis 'Apocalypse'.) The same happened in Brazil and Portugal with both countries translating The Stand as "A Dança da Morte", meaning also "The Dance of Death". Similarly, his 1978 collection of short stories Night Shift was released in France as Danse macabre in 1980. To avoid confusion, the actual "Danse Macabre" essay was given the title "Anatomie de l'horreur" ("An Anatomy of Horror") when it was released in France 15 years later, in 1995.

== Background ==
In the introduction, King credits Bill Thompson, the editor of his first five published novels, and later editor at Doubleday, as being the inspiration for its creation.

... Bill called me and said, "Why don't you do a book about the entire horror phenomenon as you see it? Books, movies, radio, TV, the whole thing. We'll do it together, if you want." The concept intrigued and frightened me at the same time.

Thompson ultimately convinced King that if he wrote such a genre survey, he would no longer have to answer tedious, repetitive interview questions on the topic.

== Editions ==
Danse Macabre was originally published in hardcover by Everest House on April 20, 1981 (ISBN 978-0896960763). Along with the trade hardcover, Everest House also published a limited edition of the book, signed by King, limited to 250 numbered copies and 15 lettered copies. The limited edition did not have a dust jacket, and instead was housed in a slipcase. Later, Berkley Books published a mass market paperback edition of the book on December 1, 1983 (ISBN 978-0425064627). A new introduction was added to this edition, entitled "Forenote to the Paperback Edition". Among other things, King discusses the fact that he asked Dennis Etchison "to comb the errors" in the original edition, and thus the 1983 paperback edition contains the corrected text of Danse Macabre. In the book's original Forenote, readers were also asked to send in any errors to be corrected, and those were incorporated as well. On February 23, 2010, Gallery Books published a new edition of Danse Macabre (ISBN 978-1439170984), a trade paperback with the corrected 1983 text, including both the original and the 1983 introductions, as well as a newly written piece "What's Scary?", which serves as a forenote to this 2010 edition.

== Synopsis ==
The backbone of the text is King's teaching notes from several college courses he taught in the 1970s. However, Danse Macabre has a casual, non-linear writing style and expresses a desire to avoid "academic bullshit".

In the introduction, titled "October 4, 1957, and an Invitation to Dance", King begins by explaining why he wrote the book, and then describes the event itself: the launching of the Soviet satellite Sputnik which inspired profound fear in him, intended as his personal introduction to what he calls "the real terror". This is followed by the chapter "Tales of the Hook", specifically "The Hook"; an urban legend about young lovers parked in a car, who narrowly avoid an attack by an escaped prisoner with a hook for a hand. King uses this legend to illustrate his contention that horror in general "offers no characterization, no theme, no particular artifice; it does not aspire to symbolic beauty".

In the following chapter, he creates a template for descriptions of his macabre subject. Entitled "Tales of the Tarot", the chapter has nothing to do with the familiar tarot card deck. Rather, King borrows the term to describe his observations about major archetypal characters of the horror genre, which he posits come from two British novels and one Irish: the vampire (from Dracula), the werewolf (from Dr. Jekyll and Mr. Hyde), and the "Thing Without a Name" (from Frankenstein). In light of the sexually repressed Victorian Era publication of Dracula, King sees a strong sexual undercurrent to the story. Frankenstein is reviewed as "a Shakespearean tragedy", and he argues that "its classical unity is broken only by the author's uncertainty as to where the fatal flaw lies—is it in Victor's hubris (usurping a power that belongs only to God) or in his failure to take responsibility for his creation after endowing it with the life-spark?" King does not mistake Mr. Hyde for a "traditional" werewolf, but rather sees the character as the origin of the modern archetype that was later defined by werewolves. The evil-werewolf archetype, argues King, stems from the base and violent side of humanity. These major archetypes are then reviewed in their historical context, ranging from their original appearances to their modern-day equivalents, up to and including cartoon breakfast cereal characters such as Frankenberry and Count Chocula.

The chapter "An Annoying Autobiographical Pause" begins with King's explanation for why he included the section: "I cannot divorce myself from a field in which I am mortally involved." He then offers a brief family history, discussing his abandonment by his father at the age of two, his childhood in rural eastern Maine, and then explains his childhood fixation with the imagery of terror and horror, making a comparison of his uncle successfully dowsing for water using the bough of an apple branch with the sudden realization of what he wanted to do for a living. While browsing through an attic with his elder brother, King uncovered a paperback version of the H.P. Lovecraft collection The Lurker in the Shadows, which had belonged to his long-since-departed father. The cover art, an illustration of a monster hiding within the recesses of a hell-like cavern beneath a tombstone, was, he writes, the moment in his life which "that interior dowsing rod responded to".

King then resumes his discussion of the horror genre by making detailed commentary of horror in all forms of media, beginning with radio, then proceeding to a highly critical review of television horror, two separate chapters on horror in the motion pictures, and finally concluding with an examination of horror fiction.

His critique on the radio examines such American programs as Suspense, Inner Sanctum, and Boris Karloff, and praises Arch Oboler's Lights Out. King ultimately concludes that, as a medium for horror, radio is superior to television and films, since radio's nature requires a more active use of imagination.

King then turns to two separate chapters of horror in the motion pictures. In "The Modern American Horror Movie—Text and Subtext," the "subtext" he refers to consists of unspoken social commentary he sees in the films. The 1951 film The Thing from Another World implies commentary on the threat of communism, "the quick, no-nonsense destruction of their favorite geopolitical villain, the dastardly Russians," King writes. The popular 1973 film The Exorcist was aptly suited in the wake of the youth upheavals of the late 1960s and early '70s. 1975's The Stepford Wives, King says, "has some witty things to say about Women's Liberation ... and the American male's response to it". In The Amityville Horror, King sees "economic unease" and maintains that the film's 1979 release during an extended economic slump "could not have come along at a more opportune moment". He also calls The China Syndrome, released the same year and usually categorized as a disaster-suspense film, a horror movie that "synthesizes technological fears ... fears of the machinery gone out of control, run wild".

In the following chapter, "The Horror Movie as Junk Food" King begins by making the statement: "I am no apologist for bad filmmaking, but once you've spent twenty years or so going to horror movies, searching for diamonds in the dreck of the B-pics ... you begin to seek the patterns and appreciate them when you find them, you begin to get a taste for really shitty movies." He makes the point that his agent Kirby McCauley had selected the obscure 1977 film Rituals as his favorite, while King himself chose 1979's Tourist Trap as one that "wields an eerie spooky power. Wax figures begin to move and come to life in a ruined, out-of-the-way tourist resort." He continues with reviews of such films as Prophecy (1979), I Married a Monster from Outer Space (1958), The Horror of Party Beach (1964), and The Rocky Horror Picture Show (1975), among others; concluding: "Bad films may sometimes be amusing, sometimes even successful, but their only real usefulness is to form that basis of comparison: to define positive values in terms of their own negative charm. They show us what to look for because it is missing in themselves."

King then turns his most weighty criticism toward television, borrowing Harlan Ellison's description of television as "the glass teat", and subtitling the chapter, "This Monster Is Brought to You by Gainesburgers". He reviews horror anthology programs such as Thriller, The Outer Limits, The Twilight Zone, Dark Shadows, and Night Gallery, ultimately concluding that television is severely limited in its ability to illustrate horror because it is enslaved to the demands of network Standards and Practices censorship and the appeasement of advertising executives that provide the financial means necessary for television to continue its free access.

In the "Horror Fiction" chapter, King describes and reviews a number of horror novels written within a few decades of Danse Macabre. He discusses Peter Straub's Ghost Story, Anne Rivers Siddons's The House Next Door, Richard Matheson's The Shrinking Man, Shirley Jackson's The Haunting of Hill House, Ray Bradbury's Something Wicked This Way Comes, Harlan Ellison's Strange Wine, Ira Levin's Rosemary's Baby, The Body Snatchers by Jack Finney, Ramsey Campbell's The Doll Who Ate His Mother, and James Herbert's The Fog. His primary context is defining what impact they have had on the horror genre, and how significantly they have contributed to the popular culture. Specifically pointing out allegories in his review, King notes:

Shirley Jackson uses the conventions of the new American Gothic to examine character under extreme psychological—or perhaps occult—pressure; Peter Straub uses them to examine the effects of an evil past upon the present; Anne Rivers Siddons uses them to examine social codes and social pressures; Bradbury uses these self-same conventions in order to offer us a moral judgment.

The final chapter, "The Last Waltz", is a brief analysis of how the medium of horror fiction in all its forms has inspired real-life acts of violence. He describes an incident in which a woman was brutally murdered by youths who confessed to imitating a scene from a TV movie, then objectively includes an example of violence perpetrated by a woman who had been reading his novel The Stand at the time she committed the crime. "If it had not been shown", he writes, "stupidity and lack of imagination might well have reduced them to murdering ... in some more mundane way." In an analysis of why people read and watch horror, he concludes, "Perhaps we go to the forbidden door or window willingly because we understand that a time comes when we must go whether we want to or not."

=== Classification ===
Additionally, King classifies the genre into three well-defined, descending levels—terror, horror, and revulsion.

- He describes terror as "the finest element" of the three, and the one he strives hardest to maintain in his own writing. Citing many examples, he defines "terror" as the suspenseful moment in horror before the actual monster is revealed.
- Horror, King writes, is that moment at which one sees the creature/aberration that causes the terror or suspense, a "shock value".
- King finally compares revulsion with the gag-reflex: a bottom-level, cheap gimmick which he admits he often resorts to in his own fiction if necessary, confessing:

I recognize terror as the finest emotion and so I will try to terrorize the reader. But if I find that I cannot terrify, I will try to horrify, and if I find that I cannot horrify, I'll go for the gross-out. I'm not proud.

== Reception ==
Kirkus recognized the book for what it is and wrote "the resulting mishmash of rap and trivia should be an orgy of fun for horror/fantasy buffs—if not for the full measure of the King-fiction readership."

Danse Macabre won the Locus Award for Best Non-fiction in 1980.

== See also ==
- Supernatural Horror in Literature by H. P. Lovecraft
