= Mark Bodé =

American cartoonist (born 1963)

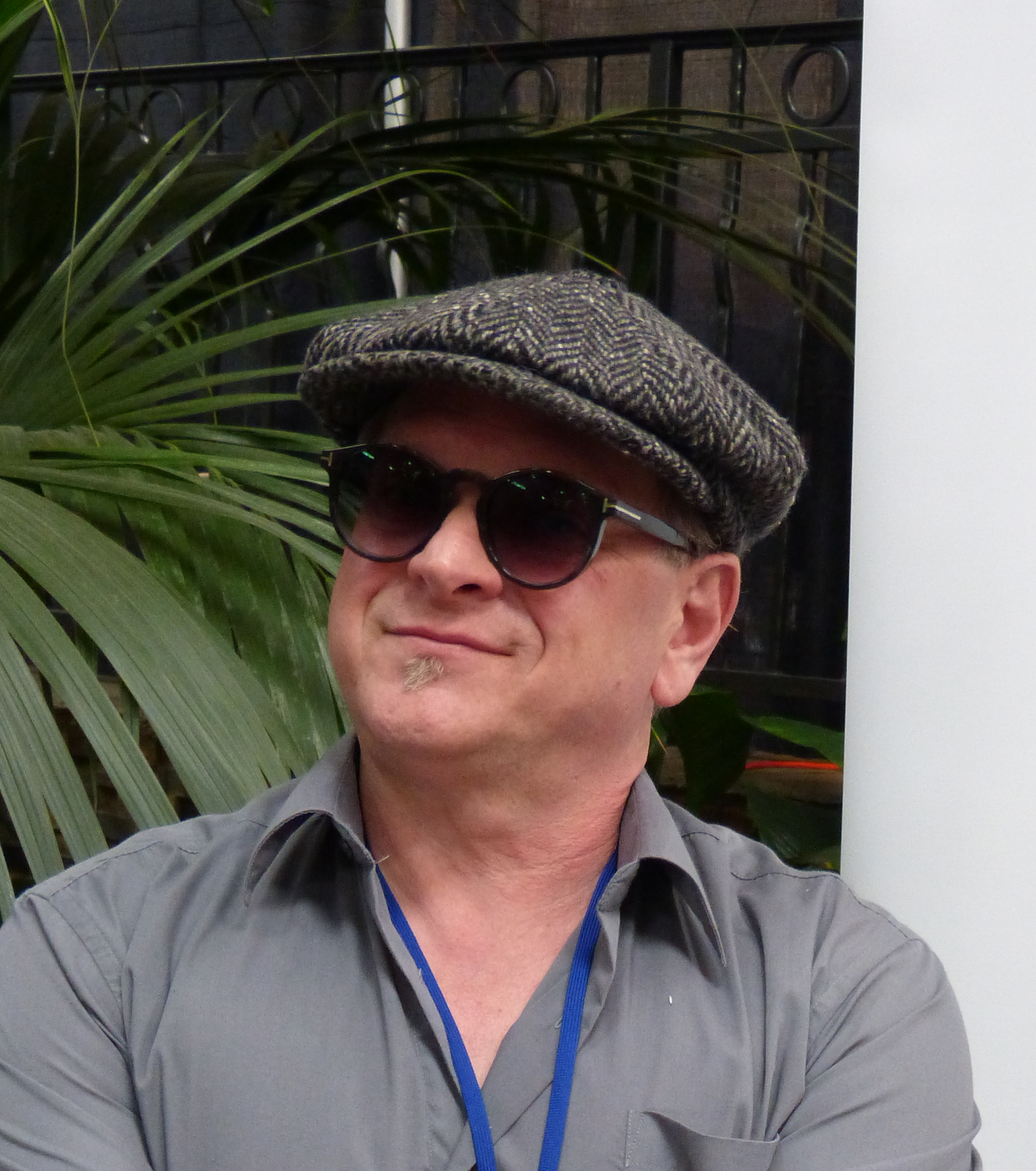
- Bodē in 2019
- Born: February 18, 1963 (age 63) Utica, New York, U.S.
- Areas: Cartoonist, Artist
- Notable works: Cobalt-60; The Lizard of Oz
- Collaborators: Vaughn Bodē, Larry Todd

Mark Bodē (/boʊˈdiː/; born February 18, 1963) is an American cartoonist. The son of underground comics legend Vaughn Bodē, Mark shares the Bodē family style and perpetuates many of his late father's creations as well as his own works. He is best known for his work on Cobalt-60, Miami Mice, and The Lizard of Oz. Bodē has also worked for Heavy Metal magazine and on The Teenage Mutant Ninja Turtles.

Bodē is also a tattoo and graffiti artist, spending many years working around Northampton, Massachusetts, although he now lives in California.

== Early life ==
Mark Bodē was born February 18, 1963, in Utica, New York, the son of the cartoonist Vaughn Bodē and Barbara Falcon. He began drawing at age three, and was encouraged to draw throughout his childhood.

He'd put a marker in my hand, and say, 'Color this area,' and make sure I didn't go crazy going outside the lines. We'd always race up this hill by our house, knock on a manhole cover and yell for Cheech. I asked him why he never came out, and he'd say, 'Well, he's chasing women and doing tricks.' He was brainwashing me into seeing his world, so the characters I started coming up with were heavily influenced by him. Right before he died he told me: 'We'll always be Bodē and son. Share my style, but don't get too close.' I couldn't wait to work with him.

When Bodē was 12 years old and visiting his divorced father Vaughn in San Francisco, he discovered the dead body of his father after the latter had died as the result of autoerotic asphyxiation.

Bodē attended art school in Oakland, California. He also studied animation at San Francisco State University. In 1982, he attended the School of Visual Arts (SVA) in New York City as a fine arts major.

While attending SVA, Bodē met Marvel Comics editor Archie Goodwin, who was starting up a new magazine called Epic Illustrated. Bodē became a contributor from 1983 to 1986.

== Career ==
=== Comics ===
Bodē has completed and expanded upon many of his father's works. As a 15-year-old, he colored the unfinished work Zooks, the First Lizard in Orbit for Heavy Metal. In 1984, he expanded and illustrated Cobalt 60, originally created as a short story by his father in 1968. Written by Larry Todd and fully painted by Mark Bodē, the story was serialized in Epic Illustrated, and later collected by The Donning Company/Starblaze Graphics and re-published as a four-issue limited series by Tundra Publishing.

Bodē was the creator of black-and-white comic Miami Mice, published by Rip Off Press in 1986. Bodē and Todd collaborated again on Rip Off Press' 1987 comic Gyro Force.

From 1988 to 1995, Bodē wrote and drew comics with Teenage Mutant Ninja Turtles co-creator Kevin Eastman. The two collaborated on several issues for Mirage Studios, including issues #18 & #32. Bodē was also the solo creator on the special edition Times Pipeline of TMNT. The Cobalt 60 saga was completed and was published as four graphic novels with Eastman's company Tundra Publishing.

In 2004, Fantagraphics published Bodē's The Lizard of Oz, a send-up of The Wizard of Oz, starring his father's iconic creation, Cheech Wizard.

Bodē's anthology work includes Subway Art, Spray Can Art, Mugs and Mascots, Burning New York, Broken Windows, Dondi White, Aerosol Kingdom, Picturing the Modern Amazon (by New Museum books), Jack Kirby's Heroes and Villains, 15 Years of Heavy Metal, 20 Years of Heavy Metal, and Comic Book Superstars.

=== Tattooing and spray can art ===
Bodē took up the art of tattooing in 1994. He trained under the guidance of tattoo artists Al Valenta, from western Massachusetts, and Myke Maldonado, from New York.

Bodē also took up spray can art, and has done many mural tributes to his father's characters over the years. In his career as a spraycan artist, he has done mural work globally in London, Spain, Italy, and Germany as well as locally in his hometown of San Francisco.

== Personal life ==
Bodē lives in Daly City, California, with his wife, Molly; they have a daughter named Zara.

== Publications ==
=== Comics ===
Mark Bodē has contributed cover illustrations and interior artwork to numerous magazines, including Penthouse, Hustler and Gauntlet. He also designed the covers for some of those magazines. In addition to this the following comics have been published:

==== Comic books ====
- 1986 Miami Mice #1 (Rip Off Press, San Francisco.)
- 1986 Mark Bodē's Miami Mice #2 (Rip Off Press, San Francisco.)
- 1986 Mark Bodē's Miami Mice #3 (Rip Off Press, San Francisco.)
- 1987 Mark Bodē's Miami Mice #4 (Rip Off Press, San Francisco.)
- 1987 Gyro Force (Rip Off Press, San Francisco.) Mit Larry Todd.
- 1987 Gyrotropolis (Rip Off Press, San Francisco.)
- 1988 GyroBotics (Rip Off Press, San Francisco.)
- 1988 Cobalt 60 (Starblaze Graphics, Virginia Beach.) With Vaughn Bodē and Larry Todd.
- 1989 Teenage Mutant Ninja Turtles #18 (Mirage Studios, Northampton.) With Kevin Eastman.
- 1989 Teenage Mutant Ninja Turtles #32 (Mirage Studios, Northampton.) With Kevin Eastman.
- 1992 Teenage Mutant Ninja Turtles: Times Pipeline (Mirage Studios, Northampton.) With Larry Todd.
- 1992 Cobalt 60 Book One (Tundra Publishing, Northampton.) ISBN 1879450356 With Vaughn Bodē and Larry Todd.
- 1992 Cobalt 60 Book Two (Tundra Publishing, Northampton.) ISBN 1879450366 With Larry Todd.
- 1992 Cobalt 60 Book Three (Tundra Publishing, Northampton.) ISBN 1879450372 With Larry Todd.
- 1992 Cobalt 60 Book Four (Tundra Publishing, Northampton.) ISBN 1879450380 With Larry Todd.
- 2004 The Lizard of Oz (Fantagraphics Books, Seattle.) ISBN 978-1560975953
- 2008 Cheech Wizard goes to Berlin (Overkill, Berlin.)
- 2014 Miami Mice – The Complete Collection (Golden Frog Press.) ISBN 978-1495107245
- 2015 Cobalt 60: The Rise of Lithium Pt.1 (Infzone Publications, Bristol.) ISBN 978-0993112836
- 2015 Cheech Wizard's Book of Me (Fantagraphics Books, Seattle.) ISBN 978-1606998199 With Vaughn Bodē.
- 2018 Cobalt 60 Episode Zero (Butler Digital.) ISBN 978-0692075180
- 2019 Cobalt 60: The Death of Cobalt (Mark Bodē self-published.) ISBN 978-1794162624

==== Contributions to anthologies and comic magazines ====
- 1978 Zalone 1. In: The Best of Cosmic Circus (Cosmic Brain Trust, Berkeley.) With John Burnham.
- 1980 Zooks. In: Heavy Metal (January, March, April 1980). (HM Communications, Easthampton.) Drawn and written by Vaughn Bodē, colorized by Mark Bodē.
- 1983 The Yellow Hat. In: Epic Illustrated #19 (Marvel Comics, New York.)
- 1984 Cheech Wizard is the greatest smartest wizard who ever lived. In: Epic Illustrated #23 (Marvel Comics, New York.)
- 1984 Gee, Cheech Wizard, I is real glad I'm your assistant. In: Epic Illustrated #23 (Marvel Comics, New York.)
- 1984 Oh, Cheech Wizard, I can't find tha mushrooms you want me to pick. In: Epic Illustrated #23 (Marvel Comics, New York.)
- 1984 Once upon a time at 2:30 in the afternoon. In: Epic Illustrated #23 (Marvel Comics, New York.)
- 1984–1985 Cobalt 60. In: Epic Illustrated #27–31 (Marvel Comics, New York.)
- 1985 Snickers That's Entertainment. In: Epic Illustrated #33 (Marvel Comics, New York.)
- 1987 Battle of the Sexes. In: Rip Off Comix #16 (Rip Off Press, San Francisco.)
- 1987 Turtle Troop. In: Grunts #1 (Mirage Studios, Northampon.)
- 1989 Machines: Big Serious Survey of Advanced Mechanical Moving Mechanisms. In: Fire Sale (Rip Off Press, San Francisco.)
- 1989 Alien Sex. In: Fire Sale (Rip Off Press, San Francisco.)
- 1990 Cherry Does Zara Tungi. In: Cherry #9 (Last Gasp, San Francisco.)
- 1990 Rebel Without a Hardon. In: Cherry #10 (Last Gasp, San Francisco.)
- 1991 The Codex of Good Head. In: Cherry #12 (Last Gasp, San Francisco.)
- 1991 I'm thinking of wonderful creative excitements... In: Tundra Mini Comic #1 (Tundra Publishing, Northampton.)
- 1991 I Have A Dream. In: Taboo Especial (Spiderbaby Grafix & Publications.)
- 1992 Elect Cherry, Tungi for President '92. In: Cherry's Jubilee #2 (Last Gasp, San Francisco.)
- 1994 Ninjara vs. Mondo Dog Catcher. In: Teenage Mutant Ninja Turtles Giant Size Special #8 (Archie Comics, Mamaroneck.)
- 1994 E = MC Zip Lock. In: Teenage Mutant Ninja Turtles Giant Size Special #11 (Archie Comics, Mamaroneck.)
- 1994: Russian Girl with Red Star. In: Heavy Metal Special Editions: Pin Up (Metal Mammoth Inc., Easthampton.)
- 1995 Cobalt 60: Da' Dust Devil. In: Heavy Metal Special Editions: Overdrive (Metal Mammoth Inc., Easthampton.)
- 1995 Young Genetically-Altered Samurai Lizards. In: Cherry #17 (Kitchen Sink Press, Northampton.)
- 1995 The Story of Chicken Licken. In: Negative Burn #21 (Caliber Comics.)
- 1996 The Moorish Lady's Story. In: A Night in a Moorish Harem #1 (NBM, New York)
- 1998 The Pied Piperess. In: Hustler Comix Vol. 1 No. 4 (Winter 1998) (L.F.P. Inc., Beverly Hills)
- 1999 The Codex of Strange Body Piercing. In: Cherry #21 (Cherry Comics, Albuquerque.)
- 2000 I Think I'm Going to Vomit. In: Cherry #22 (Cherry Comics, Albuquerque.)
- 2007 The Lone Lizard: Hang Um' When They're High. In: Heavy Metal (September 2007). (Metal Mammoth Inc., Easthampton.)
- 2020 Sunpot: Dr. Electric Meets Da Repo Man. In: Heavy Metal #300-301 (Heavy Metal, LLC.)
- 2020 Cobalt-19. In: Heavy Metal #302 (Heavy Metal, LLC.)

==== Other ====
- 2013 The Big Book of Bodē Tattoos (Last Gasp, San Francisco.) ISBN 978-0867197792. Contains mostly tattoo designs and drawings by Mark Bodē and some works by his father Vaughn.

== Exhibits ==
- November 2013 — West Bank Gallery, London
- October 2013 — Warfield Theater mural, San Francisco (with Osgemeos)
- May 2013 — Montana Gallery, Barcelona
- 2013 — Yard Five, Berlin, Germany
- August 2012 — 1AM Gallery, San Francisco
- July 2012 — Arctic Gallery, Amsterdam
- 2010 — 1AM Gallery, San Francisco: Wizards, Lizards and Broads
- 2008 — Berghain Club, Berlin
- 2005 — Oaklandish Gallery, Oakland, California
- 2004 — The Upper Playground Gallery, San Francisco
- 1999 — New Museum: Picturing the Modern Amazon
- 1993 — The Psychedelic Solution Gallery, New York City
