= A Change of Hobbit =

- Location: (1st location) Westwood Village, West Los Angeles (2nd location) Westwood Boulevard, West Los Angeles (3rd location) Lincoln Boulevard, Santa Monica (4th location) 2nd Street, Santa Monica
- Opening date: 1972
- Closing date: 1991
- Owner: Sherry Gottlieb
- Goods sold: Speculative fiction

A Change of Hobbit (1972–1991) was one of the first science fiction, fantasy and horror bookstores established, and was a significant part of science fiction fandom generally and in Southern California particularly. The name puns on the hobbits of J.R.R. Tolkien's The Lord of the Rings.

The Change of Hobbit bookstore hosted numerous events, including, famously, Harlan Ellison in its front window, writing a story in public view over the course of a week. The store was also a mainstay on author tours, as Anne Rice noted: "Authors around the world have dreamed of going to the Hobbit for signings. What's a West Coast tour if you can't visit Sherry?" The store was also notable for Gottlieb's pet boa constrictor, "Wrinklesnakeskin".

== History ==
In 1972, when she was 23 years old, Gottlieb first opened the store in Westwood Village near UCLA. In a tiny location, 12ʹ × 15ʹ above a laundromat, the store was a success and became a popular Tuesday-night meeting location for authors and fans. A year later she expanded and moved the store a mile away to a larger location on Westwood Boulevard, then a few years later to a Lincoln Boulevard location in Santa Monica. In 1989, Gottlieb moved the store to its final location on 2nd Street in Santa Monica, but then closed the store in 1991.

Gottlieb also offered the use of her store's name to colleagues in Berkeley, who in 1977 established The Other Change of Hobbit bookstore; though it no longer has a physical storefront, as of 2021 that store continues to operate in the Bay Area.
