= Graphic Story Magazine =

- This 1974 cover was Howard Nostrand's first humorous horror art since his stories for Harvey Comics' Flip during the early 1950s.
- Editor: Bill Spicer
- Categories: comic books stories and criticism
- Frequency: annually
- First issue: 1967
- Final issue Number: Summer 1974; 16
- Country: United States
- Based in: California
- Language: English

Graphic Story Magazine was an American magazine edited and published by Bill Spicer in the late 1960s and early 1970s. Attempting to find a new direction for narrative art and a point of departure from commercial comic book stories, this journal of criticism and artwork evolved from Spicer's previous magazine, Fantasy Illustrated.

Gary Groth, editor-publisher of The Comics Journal and Fantagraphics Books, wrote in 2009,

By the late 1960s, Graphic Story Magazine evolved into the most literate “fanzine.” I remember thinking, at the time, that GSM looked like it was put together by grown-ups, whereas most fanzines, mine included, were cobbled together by my peers — precocious but essentially clueless high school kids. Spicer brought a rare maturity to fanzines that had been conspicuously absent. His editorial direction was less fanboyish and more professional; that is, he and his writers — among whom were John Benson and Richard Kyle — focused less on characters and more on individual cartoonists and in a far more searching way than most other “fan” writers of the time. GSM pioneered long, probing interviews ... which was mostly a matter of asking intelligently conceived questions — or at least of avoiding the usual cretinous fanboy idolatry that wasted so many opportunities.

== Publication history ==
There were nine issues of Graphic Story Magazine (with the issue numbering continuing from Fantasy Illustrated), with pages per issue varying from 32 pages to the 64-page issue #14 (Winter 1971–72). As writer and historian Steven Grant describes the magazine's roots:

Out in California, Bill Spicer created a truly wonderful fanzine with no specific orientation, Fantasy Illustrated, that had as much in common with the nascent underground comics as with the mainstream. By the early 70s, Spicer positioned himself as a progressive force and changed the name to Graphic Story Magazine ... [and] started a newsletter called Graphic Story World.

Issues #12 and #14 were devoted entirely to the work of Basil Wolverton. Interviews included Alex Toth (#10). Will Gould (#11), John Severin (#13), Gahan Wilson (#15), and Howard Nostrand (#16).

The run ended with issue #16 (Summer 1974).

== Artists and writers ==
issue #14 (Winter 1971–72) featured Basil Wolverton's Powerhouse Pepper, Shock Shannon, The Story of Man, The Counter Culture, Common Types of Barflize and Wolverton caricatures, plus an interview with Wolverton.

The final issue, #16 (Summer 1974), included "The Wishing World" by Mark Evanier and John Pound, "Routine" by George Metzger, a story by Bob Powell (Colorama) and Bhob Stewart's interview with artist Howard Nostrand (later reprinted in The Comics Journal). The front cover by Nostrand showed a decaying, skeletal comic book artist returning from the grave to deliver a completed story to a comic book publisher.

== Spin-offs ==
The newsletter Graphic Story World became Wonderworld. Spicer later teamed with Evanier to edit and publish Fanfare, covering popular culture in general.

== See also ==
- Comic Art
- Graphic storytelling
- Hogan's Alley
- Nemo, the Classic Comics Library
- witzend
- Xero
