= Fort Shelby =

Fort Shelby may refer to:

- Fort Shelby (Michigan), U.S.
- Fort Shelby (Wisconsin), U.S.
- Fort Shelby Hotel in Detroit, U.S.

== See also ==
- Camp Shelby, in Hattiesburg, Mississippi, U.S.
