= Greg Theakston =

American comics artist and illustrator (1953–2019)

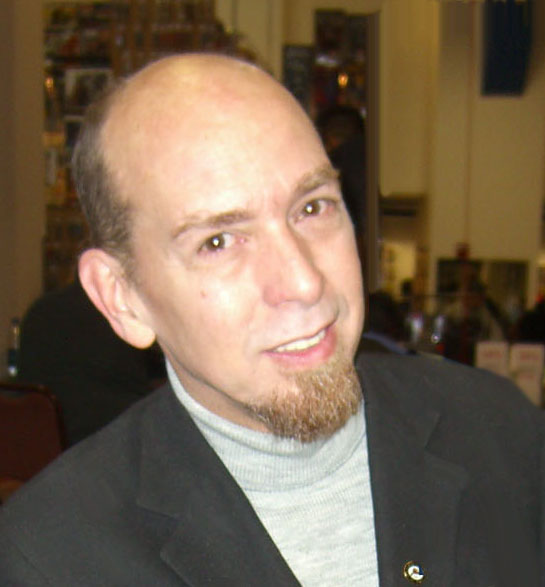
- Greg Theakston at the Big Apple Con in November 2008
- Born: Greg Allen Theakston; November 21, 1953
- Died: April 22, 2019 (aged 65)
- Areas: Painter; Colorist; Inker; Penciller; Historian; Publisher
- Pseudonym: Earl P. Wooten
- Awards: Shel Dorf Torch Bearer's Award, 2010

Greg Allen Theakston (November 21, 1953 – April 22, 2019) was an American comics artist and illustrator who worked for numerous publishers. He is known for his independent publications as a comics historian under his Pure Imagination imprint, as well as for developing the Theakstonizing process used in comics restoration. He used the pseudonym Earl P. Wooten.

== Early career ==
Greg Theakston became involved in the Detroit area fandom community, contributing to Detroit's Fantasy Fans and Comic-collector's Group on their fanzine The Fan Informer (1968–71), as well as his own publication, The Aardvark Annual (1968), and Titan. For much of the 1970s Theakston helped organize the Detroit Triple Fan Fair, credited as one of the first conventions in the United States dedicated to comic books, eventually owning it after working on a number of shows.

After graduating from Redford High School in 1971, Theakston worked with artist Jim Steranko at his Supergraphics publishing company in Reading, Pennsylvania. He moved with partner Carl Lundgren to upstate New York in 1972, where he began illustrating for men's magazines, including Gent, Dude and Nugget. He also inked samples of Jim Starlin's early pencils, which helped Starlin gain his first work for Marvel Comics in 1972.

== Illustration and comics ==
Theakston built his portfolio and expanded to paperbacks and magazines, including Berkley Books, Dell, Ace, DAW, Zebra, Tor, St. Martin's Press, Warner, Ballantine Books, Belmont-Tower, If and Galaxy Science Fiction. He was an original member of the Crusty Bunkers, and worked closely with Neal Adams at Continuity Associates between 1972 and 1979, producing animatics, storyboards, comic art and various commercial advertising assignments.

Among other various assignments were jobs for Marvel Comics, DC Comics, Image Comics, Warren Comics, New York Daily News, Archie Comics, as well as periodicals magazines including National Lampoon, The New York Times, Kitchen Sink, Playboy, TV Guide and Rolling Stone. He was a Mad illustrator for ten years and has worked regularly with numerous comics publishers on projects such as Omega Men, Super Powers, DC Comics Presents, DC's Who's Who and Planet of the Apes.

== Posters and publishing ==
Theakston's movie poster work include Invaders From Mars. He has seven lithographs in the permanent collection of The Museum of Modern Art.

Theakston founded and operated Pure Imagination, a comic book and magazine publisher since 1975. His biographical work includes an estimated 200,000 words on Jack Kirby, his long-time friend and work associate, 250,000 words on Bettie Page, numerous pieces on great comic book artists, and pop culture figures for Pure Imagination and other publishers including Mad, Penthouse and Playboy.

== Comics restoration ==
His name has been given to a process called "Theakstonizing", a term coined by DC Comics executive editor, Dick Giordano, which bleaches color from old comics pages, used in the restoration for reprinting. He reconstructed over 12,000 pages of classic comic art, including work on Superman, Batman, Captain America, Green Lantern, The Flash, Porky Pig, The Spirit, The Human Torch, Sub-Mariner, Archie, Dick Tracy, Torchy, Pogo and numerous collections of popular comics artists, including Jack Kirby, Alex Toth, Basil Wolverton, Steve Ditko, Frank Frazetta, Jack Cole, Lou Fine, Wallace Wood, and many others.

== Awards ==
Theakston received the Shel Dorf Torch Bearer's Award in 2010 "[f]or Preserving the Flame of the Spirit of Comics and Carrying the Torch Forward in the Comic Industry."
