= Detroit Triple Fan Fair =

Defunct multigenre convention; one of the first U.S. comic book conventions

- Shel Dorf's design for the DTFF logo.
- Status: Defunct
- Genre: Comics, fantasy books, and science fiction movies
- Venue: Pick-Fort Shelby Hotel (1968, 1972, 1973); Howard Johnson's New Center Motor Lodge (1969–1970); Detroit Hilton (1973–1974)
- Locations: Detroit, Michigan
- Country: United States
- Inaugurated: 1965; 61 years ago
- Most recent: 1977; 49 years ago
- Organizer: Detroit Triple Fan Fair Productions
- Filing status: Nonprofit

The Detroit Triple Fan Fair (DTFF) was a multigenre convention generally held annually in Detroit from 1965 to 1977. It is credited for being one of the first comic book conventions in the United States. The Triple Fan Fair also gave balanced coverage to historic film showings and science fiction literature, in a manner that provided a template for many future convention organizers — most of which have yet to attain the same level of equal service to this sort of linked fan base.

In addition to the typical convention features like a dealer room and panel-led discussions, the Detroit Triple Fan Fair featured a costume contest, and "films till dawn" (often running all night long for the convention's duration). From 1967 to at least 1969, the show presented the Nova Award to that year's guest of honor. In later years, the DTFF also sponsored an amateur film contest.

== History ==
On May 24, 1964, at the Hotel Tuller, teenagers Robert Brosch and Dave Szurek organized a Detroit-based convention for about 80 fans of the comic book medium. Jerry Bails, the "father of comics fandom," was on the organizing committee, along with members of the Michigan Science Fiction Society (the so-called "Misfits.")

The next year Bails and local comics enthusiast Shel Dorf took over the event, christening it the Detroit Triple Fan Fair (referring to fantasy literature, fantasy films, and comic art) and organizing it as an annual event (although no show was held in 1966). The board of the initial official Detroit Triple Fan Fair consisted of Bails, Carl Lundgren, Tom Altschuler, Ed Aprill, Noel Cooper, Gary Crowdus, Howard DeVore, Marvin Giles, Dennis Kowicki, Larry Larson, and Eugene Seeger. Robert Brosch, an authority on horror films, also stayed involved with the DTFF in various capacities at least through 1970.

The first official DTFF took place July 24–25, 1965, at the Embassy Hotel in Detroit. Admission charge was $2.00 for both days.

In what soon became a trend, aspiring local comic book creators flocked to the early events, and often became involved with organizing the show each year. For instance, the then-18-year-old Carl Lundgren was co-chairman of the 1965 DTFF, and Rich Buckler also attended the initial shows as a teenager, eventually "running things." Arvell Jones recalls many members of the so-called "Detroit Mob" making appearances at various shows, including Buckler, Greg Theakston, Tom Orzechowski, Keith Pollard, Jim Starlin, Mike Vosburg, Al Milgrom, Terry Austin, and Michael Netzer (Nasser). The reputation of the convention was such that a number of other industry professionals would appear at the event unbilled.

The 1968 DTFF, held on the weekend of June 15 and 16 featuring guest of honor Harlan Ellison, took place at the Pick Fort Shelby Hotel (the site of the 17th World Science Fiction Convention, dubbed "Detention", held in 1959). According to reports, the convention cleared a "$60 profit on a budget of $1,100." ("Profits [were] banked toward the promotion of another Triple Fan Fair in mid-1969.")

The convention started Friday night with a "Welcome Harlan" party at the home of Hal Shapiro. Saturday morning the huckster room did a booming business in old comics and movie materials. Science fiction moved rather slowly. At noon the program began, with introductions, followed by a chalk talk by Bob Taylor of MAD magazine... The evening banquet presented Guest of Honor Harlan Ellison, sharing honors with Ken Muse, a local artist who draws "way out".... The comics panel convened later in the evening. Panelists included Don & Maggie Thompson, Ed Aprill Jr., Marvin Giles, Eugene Seiger, and Shel Dorf, moderated by Robert Brosch. The principal subject was "Are Modern Comics Better Than The Golden Age?"... Early Sunday afternoon the committee auctioned off several hundred pieces of original artwork and manuscripts. Following the auction a pulp panel convened, chaired by Lynn Hickman, including Rusty Hevelin, Marvin Giles, Fred Cook, Howard DeVore, and Clara Griffis.... Then came the widely billed "Inquisition of Ellison” by Detroit area sf writers. They put Harlan to the ’Question’ . It consisted of all these writers asking Harlan questions and when he gave an answer asking him to explain his reasons for doing this. Needless to say Harlan held his own. The 'inquisition' was probably the best portion of the entire program.

Letterer Ken Bruzenak attended the 1969 convention, where he met his hero Jim Steranko, and also crossed paths with future collaborator Howard Chaykin for the first time.

Co-founder Dorf left Detroit and the DTFF for Southern California in late 1969, where he shortly founded what became San Diego Comic-Con.

The 1970 show, organized by Buckler and DTFF originator Robert Brosch, expanded to a five-day affair that shared events with "Dum-Dum '70" (put on by Burroughs' Bibliophiles). Guests and attending professionals included Philip José Farmer (the Dum-Dum Guest of Honor), Jim Steranko, Algis Budrys, Don & Maggie Thompson, Jerry Bails, Marv Wolfman, Len Wein, Bernie Wrightson, Alan Weiss, Mike Friedrich, and John Jakes. Panels were held on such topics as Carl Barks & Walt Kelly, the future of comics, and a "sword & sorcery symposium." The Academy of Comic Book Arts provided an exhibit of original art. The dealer room was known as the "Huckster Room" and "movies till dawn" were shown every night from Sept. 3–6. A masquerade ball, with prizes for the best costume, was held Saturday night. In addition to co-organizer Buckler, other attendees at the 1970 DTFF who later became comics industry professionals included Arvell Jones, Tom Orzechowski, Greg Theakston, and Tony Isabella.

No DTFF was held in 1971, and Detroit-area enthusiasts Tom Orzechowski, Terry Austin, Tony Isabella, Arvell Jones, Martin Pasko, and Jerry Bails feared it would fade away entirely. Accordingly, in August 1972 they organized the Detroit Tri-Con, held August 3–6 at the Pick-Fort Shelby Hotel. Official guests were Gray Morrow, Lin Carter, and Fan Guest of Honor Rick Yager; other guests included Edmond Hamilton, Leigh Brackett, Al Williamson, Russ Myers, John Jakes, T. Casey Brennan, and Robert Taylor; the program cover was by Gray Morrow. Films included Fritz Lang's Metropolis, Douglas Fairbanks' The Thief of Bagdad, Arthur Conan Doyle's The Lost World, and Humphrey Bogart's The Maltese Falcon.

Greg Theakston became a major player in the DTFF after Shel Dorf left, coming to own it from 1973 until its 1978 dissolution. In response to the Detroit Tri-Con, and asserting that the Triple Fan Fair was "alive and well," Theakston staged a DTFF from October 19–22, 1972. That year's show shared billing with Al Schuster's Star Trek Convention; guests included Gene Roddenberry and Majel Barrett, as well as Neal Adams. "Films till dawn" shown at the 1972 DTFF included such Pre-Code Hollywood classics as The Invisible Man, Bela Lugosi's Dracula, and Boris Karloff's Frankenstein and Bride of Frankenstein; a selection of Hammer Horror films; an uncut version of Night of the Living Dead; four Marx Brothers films; and 12 Star Trek episodes. In addition, Vaughn Bodē debuted his "Bodē Cartoon Concert" at the 1972 show, in front of a crowd of 80 people. Admission each day to the 1972 DTFF was $4 at the door. (Illustrator Joe Barney — who later worked for Neal Adams' Continuity Studios — claims to have met his idol Jim Steranko at the 1971 Detroit Triple Fan Fair, but there is no record of a DTFF being held in 1971. Barney remembers Vaughn Bodē, Jeff Jones, Greg Theakston, Michael Nasser, and Keith Pollard being at the same show, which means he was probably thinking of the 1972 edition of DTFF.)

One of Theakston's first acts as official DTFF owner was to hold two shows in 1973, one over Memorial Day weekend, and one in October. Chuck Rozanski, later a major Denver-area comics retailer, hitchhiked to Detroit for the Memorial Day DTFF, slept in Jerry Bails' home, and set up as a dealer at the show. Rozanski converted 50 high-value comics he brought with him into an inventory of more than 2,000 comics. By the end of the show, he had made more than $400 and had over 1000 comics which he sent back to Denver for future sales. (Rozanski opened his first store in Denver the following year.)

The October 1973 show, featuring Barry Smith, Michael Kaluta, George A. Romero, and Russ Heath, sponsored an amateur film contest and the annual "masque" (with a $100 first prize).

In 1974, DTFF was considered the largest fan convention, in terms of attendance, in the Midwest. The 1974 edition featured an Academy of Comic Book Arts exhibit, an amateur film contest, and the annual "masque" with a $150 first prize. Thursday night's "films till dawn" and "fractured flickers" included six Amos 'n' Andy episodes. Artist Michael Netzer (then known as Michael Nasser) remembers that Greg Theakston introduced him to Neal Adams at the 1974 DTFF. Adams took interest in Netzer's art and invited him to join Continuity Studios.

By the mid-to-late 1970s, many of the Detroit-area creators who had helped organize the show had relocated to New York City to work for Marvel and DC. The DTFF would continue sporadically through the 1970s. There was no DTFF held in 1975. In 1977, there was a final Triple Fan Fair held at the now-defunct Hilton in Troy, Michigan — that edition of the DTFF was known as the "Detroit Triple Fan Fair (in Exile)." Guests of honor at that event were Chuck Jones, Charles H. Schneer, and Ray Harryhausen. Films screened at the 1977 DTFF included the Harryhausen movies It Came from Beneath the Sea, The 7th Voyage of Sinbad, and Sinbad and the Eye of the Tiger.

Comic book artist Gray Morrow claimed to have illustrated the 1978 DTFF program booklet, but there is no record of a show being held that year.

=== Legacy ===
From 1984 to 1986, local-area grad student Gary Reed (later publisher of Caliber Press) ran a local convention known as King Kon. Starting in 1989, comics retailer Michael Goldman launched a for-profit endeavor called the Motor City Comic Con; it continues as an annual show to the present day.

The Detroit Fanfare, established in 2010, openly acknowledged its debt to the Detroit Triple Fan Fair:

Detroit has a very strong connection with comic conventions and fandom. Some of the earliest fandom magazines came out of the Detroit area in the late 1960s and the Detroit Triple Fan Fair was the first convention of its kind. ... Detroit Fanfare is both proud and excited to bring back home some of the major participants that helped to grow the comic industry into the behemoth it is today. There will [be] panels and discussions where the people who started so much will have a chance to discuss the early days, and reflect on their memories of the great stars that attended the convention. They will provide rare pictures and original drawings of some of the masters of the medium.

In another nod to the DTFF, the Detroit Fanfare also distributed the "Shel Dorf Awards". The Detroit Fanfare ceased operations after the 2012 convention.

=== Dates and locations ===
#	Dates	Venue	Organizer	Official guests	"Films till dawn"	Notes
0	May 24, 1964	Hotel Tuller	Robert Brosch with Dave Szurek	None		'"Detroit Science Fiction Comic Book Convention'"; precursor to DTFF; c. 80 attendees
1	July 24–25, 1965	Embassy Hotel	Jerry Bails, Shel Dorf, Carl Lundgren	None	Phantom of the Opera (1925 movie)	First "official" DTFF; more than a dozen comics dealers; 150 attendees; $2 at the door
2	June 17–18, 1967	Park Shelton Hotel	Marvin S. Giles, with Robert Brosch	Roger Zelazny (Guest of Honor), Robert Taylor		2nd official DTFF; presentation of the first Nova Award
3	June 15–16, 1968	Pick-Fort Shelby Hotel	Shel Dorf	Harlan Ellison (Guest of Honor)	Saturday: "Demon with a Glass Hand" (The Outer Limits), Forbidden Planet, Adventures of Captain Marvel serial, and Cat People (1942 film); Sunday: The Crimson Ghost serial	c. 175 attendees
4	June 7–8, 1969	Howard Johnson's Downtown Motor Inn	Hal Shapiro with George Young and Rich Buckler	Al Williamson (Guest of Honor), Leigh Brackett, Edmond Hamilton, Stan Lee, and; other guests: Jim Steranko and Howard Chaykin	The Mummy (1932 film), Frankenstein (1931 film), The Bells (1931 film), The Big Sleep (1946 film)	Attendees include a young Ken Bruzenak and a young Tom Orzechowski
5	September 3–7, 1970	Howard Johnson's New Center Motor Lodge	Rich Buckler and Robert Brosch	Jim Steranko (Guest of Honor) and Philip José Farmer (Dum-Dum Guest of Honor), Algis Budrys		Shared event with Dum-Dum '70 (Burroughs' Bibliophiles); 225 registered attendees
6	May 1972		Robert Brosch with Greg Theakston	Russ Heath (Guest of Honor)		
7	October 19–22, 1972	Pick-Fort Shelby Hotel	Robert Brosch with Greg Theakston and Lawrence Gibson Jr.	Neal Adams, Jim Steranko, Vaughn Bodé, Jeff Jones (all four are Comic Book Guests of Honor); Star Trek guests Gene Roddenberry, Majel Barrett, James Doohan and D.C. Fontana; Bud Plant, Dale Manesis, Jerry Bails, Phil Seuling,	The Adventures of Robin Hood, Forbidden Planet, The Invisible Man, Dracula, Frankenstein (1931 film), Bride of Frankenstein, Five Million Years to Earth Horror of Dracula, The Brides of Dracula, The Devil's Bride, The Abominable Dr. Phibes, Planet of the Apes (1968 film), Night of the Living Dead ("all choice cuts"), Duck Soup, A Day at the Races, At the Circus, Horsefeathers, Island of Lost Souls, First Men in the Moon (1964 film), Invasion of the Body Snatchers, The Beast from 20,000 Fathoms, The Maltese Falcon (1941 film), 12 Star Trek: The Original Series episodes	shared event with Al Schuster's Star Trek Convention
8	May 25–28, 1973	Pick-Fort Shelby Hotel	Robert Brosch with Greg Theakston	Jerry Bails	Friday: Go West, The Big Store, Duck Soup, Horror of Dracula, Night of the Living Dead, Mad Love (1935 film), Mystery of the Wax Museum. Saturday: Animal Crackers (1930 film), Monkey Business (1931 film), The Cocoanuts. Sunday: Planet of the Apes (1968 film), On Her Majesty's Secret Service, Silent Running, The Day the Earth Stood Still, 2001: A Space Odyssey, The Andromeda Strain.	Memorial Day weekend; $4 at the door
9	October 18–21, 1973	Detroit Hilton	Robert Brosch with Greg Theakston and Carl Friedlander	Barry Windsor-Smith, Michael Kaluta, George A. Romero, and Russ Heath	Thursday: Play Misty for Me The Loved One, Casablanca, Play It Again, Sam, Animal Crackers (1930 film), A Night at the Opera, The Graduate. Friday: 10 Warner Bros. cartoons, 6 Amos 'n' Andy episodes, Goldfinger, From Russia with Love, On Her Majesty's Secret Service, Night of the Living Dead, The Wild Bunch. Saturday: 10 Warner Bros. cartoons, This Island Earth, 2001: A Space Odyssey, Forbidden Planet, The Time Machine (1960 film), The War of the Worlds (1953 film).	2nd show of 1973; 17-year-old Canadian comics enthusiast Dave Sim attends as a writer for the zine Comic Art News and Reviews
10	October 10–13, 1974	Detroit Hilton	Robert Brosch with Greg Theakston and Carl Friedlander	Carmine Infantino, Stan Lee, James Warren (all three are Guests of Honor) and Jim Steranko ("Master of Ceremonies"); other guests include Alan Ormsby, Rich Buckler, Keith Pollard, Arvell Jones, Neal Adams, Jim Starlin, and Al Milgrom	Thursday: Island of Lost Souls, 3 Amos 'n' Andy episodes, Jack the Giant Killer, Forbidden Planet, Night of the Living Dead, Evil Brain from Outer Space. Friday: 3 Amos 'n' Andy episodes, For a Few Dollars More, The Good, the Bad and the Ugly, Where Eagles Dare, Plan 9 from Outer Space. Saturday: Children Shouldn't Play with Dead Things, Deranged, Count Dracula, The Wizard of Oz, Beneath the Planet of the Apes, Journey to the Center of the Earth.	Known as "DTFF 10"; $1.50 per day admission at the door
11	October 1976	Book-Cadillac Hotel, Detroit	Greg Theakston with Carl Lundgren	Joe Kubert (Guest of Honor), Jerry Bails (Fan Guest of Honor)		program includes "a history of the Detroit Triple Fan Fair"
12	May 28–30, 1977	Troy Hilton	Greg Theakston	Ray Harryhausen (Guest of Honor), Charles H. Schneer	It Came from Beneath the Sea, The 7th Voyage of Sinbad, Sinbad and the Eye of the Tiger	
13	October, 1977	Troy Hilton	Greg Theakston	Chuck Jones (Guest of Honor)		self-titled the "Detroit Triple Fan Fair (in Exile)"

== Nova Awards ==
The Nova Award was created by Jack Promo and Marvin S. Giles, and was first presented in 1967.

- 1967 Roger Zelazny — "in recognition of outstanding contribution to science fiction and fantasy"
- 1968 Harlan Ellison
- 1969 Al Williamson — "in recognition of his achievements in illustrative art"

== Program booklets ==
- 1965 DTFF #1 program cover designed by Shel Dorf
- 1967 DTFF #2 program cover used Jack Kirby art from the cover of Fantastic Four Annual #3 [marriage of Sue and Reed issue]
- 1968 DTFF #3 program cover by Rich Buckler depicting Flash Gordon as drawn by Reed Crandall
- 1969 DTFF #4 program cover by Jack Kirby in pencil depicting Loki and two other denizens of Asgard
- 1970 DTFF #5 program cover by Jim Steranko, and interior art pages by Neal Adams and Bernie Wrightson. The program booklet was dedicated to Jack Kirby.
- 1972 May DTFF #6 program cover by Russ Heath
- 1972 October DTFF #7 program cover by Neal Adams, featuring Batman, Deadman, Green Lantern, Green Arrow, and the Starship Enterprise
- 1973 May DTFF #8
- 1973 October DTFF #9 program cover illustration of Conan by Barry Windsor-Smith
- 1974 DTFF #10 program cover illustration of The Spirit by Will Eisner
- 1976 DTFF #11 program cover by Joe Kubert of Tarzan
- 1977 May DTFF #12 program cover by artwork depicting Troglodyte from Ray Harryhausen's Sinbad and the Eye of the Tiger
- 1977 October DTFF #13 program cover by Chuck Jones, billed as "Detroit Triple Fan Fair 13"

== Progress reports ==
The DTFF published "progress reports" in 1969, 1970, 1972, 1973, 1974, as many as three for some of their conventions. Contributors included Allen Park and Robert Brosch; cover illustrations were by Al Williamson, Frank Frazetta, and Neal Adams (Batman).

== See also ==
- List of defunct comic book conventions
