= Pure Imagination (comics) =

American comic publisher founded by Greg Theakson

- Founded: 1975; 51 years ago
- Founder: Greg Theakston
- Country of origin: United States
- Headquarters location: New York City
- Publication types: Comics, magazines
- Official website: pureimagination.info

Pure Imagination is a comic book, magazine, and comics-related book publisher run by Greg Theakston since 1975.

While briefly doing some original comics in the 1990s, as well as publishing a few "girlie" magazines, Pure Imagination's main focus has been publishing books to preserve the great works of several comic artists. This includes the aborted Complete Jack Kirby series, and the several Reader volumes that continue to this day. Another series is Edge of Genius, which focuses on the period in which artists "come into their own." Pure Imagination has also produced some CDs that reprint multiple editions of the Reader books.

== Titles ==
=== Comics ===
- Buried Treasure, three issues
- Doc Weird's Thrill Book, three issues, 1987–88
- Intense!, three issues, 1993
- Lone Ranger, one issue
- Pure Images, five issues
- Sky Masters, one issue, 1991
- Torchy, five issues and one Annual

=== Magazines ===
- Betty Pages, nine issues and two Annuals (1987–93)
- Buried Treasure, three issues (1986–87)
- Tease, nine issues, (1995-2003)
- The Neal Adams Treasury V1&2
- Lou Fine Comics Treasury, 1991
- The Frank Frazetta Treasury
- The Jack Kirby Treasury, V1&2 (1982)
- The Wallace Wood Treasury
- The Berni Wrightson Treasury
- Johnny Comet
- The Rare Frazetta
- White Indian
- The Comic Strip Frazetta
- Simon & Kirby Classics 1- Stuntman, 1987

=== Books ===
- Forrest Ackerman's Wonderama Annual, 1993 ISBN 1-56685-001-0
- Vaughn Bode: Rare and Well Done, 2006.
- The Best of Jack Cole, 2006 (Quality work from 1938 to 1953) ISBN 1-56685-032-0
- Steve Ditko: Edge of Genius, 2009.
- Steve Ditko Reader, 2002 (Charlton work from 1954 to 1960, 63) ISBN 1-56685-011-8
- Steve Ditko Reader v2, 2004 (Charlton work from 1957 to 1959, 62) ASIN B000GPO690 ISBN 978-1-56685-023-0
- Steve Ditko Reader v3, 2005 (Charlton work from 1954 to 1959, 66) ISBN 1-56685-031-2
- Steve Ditko's The Thing, 2005 (all Ditko's work from The Thing!, plus Charlton 1957–60) ISBN 1-56685-028-2
- Big Book o' Ditko, 2010 ISBN 978-1-56685-060-5
- Will Eisner: Edge of Genius 2007 ISBN 1-56685-037-1
- The Eisner Shop
- Lou Fine Reader, 2003 (Flame, Doll Man, Uncle Sam, Ray, Black Condor work) ISBN 1-56685-025-8
- Lou Fine Reader v2
- The Comic Strip Jack Kirby, 2006 (Syndicated work 1936–39) ISBN 1-56685-028-2
- Complete Sky Masters of the Space Force, 2000 ISBN 1-56685-009-6
- Complete Jack Kirby
  - Volume 1: 1917–40, 1997 ISBN 978-1-56685-006-3
  - Volume 2: September 1940 to March 1941, 1997 ISBN 978-1-56685-007-0
  - Volume 3: March - May 1947, 1998 ISBN 1-56685-008-8
  - Volume 4: June - August 1947, 2001 no ISBN
  - Volume 5: September–October 1947, 2007
- Jack Kirby's Heroes & Villains, Black Magic Edition, 1994
- Jack Kirby Reader, 2003 (1937–53, 55, 60 work from Prize, Harvey, Charlton) ISBN 1-56685-016-9
- Jack Kirby Reader v2, 2004 (1940, 47–49, 52, 56–57) ISBN 1-56685-026-6
- Joe Kubert Reader, 2011 ISBN 978-1-56685-063-6
- Miss Fury, 2008
- Parade of Pleasure, 2010 ISBN 978-1-56685-083-4
- Thrill Book, 2004 (50s horror & SF comics) ISBN 1-56685-015-0
- Torchy
- Torchy, v2, 2009 ISBN 978-1-56685-057-5
- Alex Toth in Hollywood
- Alex Toth in Hollywood, v2, 2010 ISBN 978-1-56685-082-7
- Alex Toth Reader, 2005
- Alex Toth Reader v2, 2005
- Alex Toth: Edge of Genius v1 2007 (1947–52, Famous Funnies, Standard Comics) ISBN 1-56685-037-1
- Alex Toth: Edge of Genius v2, 2008
- Al Williamson Reader
- Al Williamson: Forbidden Worlds, 2009 ISBN 978-1-56685-081-0
- Basil Wolverton Reader, 2003 ISBN 1-56685-017-7 (Powerhouse Pepper stories)
- Basil Wolverton Reader v2, 2004 (work from 1942 to 1954) ISBN 1-56685-027-4
- Basil Wolverton: Agony and Ecstasy, 2007 (reprints from "The Bible Story" v1-6) ISBN 1-56685-041-X
- Wallace Wood Reader, 2004 (1951, 56, 64, including Captain Science) ISBN 1-56685-028-2
- Wallace Wood's Wayout, 2005 (wash illos for Galaxy, 58–60, 65 and if 60, 68) ISBN 1-56685-028-2
- Wild Wood, 2010
- Wallace Wood: Edge of Genius, 2009
