= Bill Spicer =

American comic book publisher and editor

- Born: October 1, 1937 (age 89) Los Angeles, California, U.S.
- Areas: Editor, Publisher, Letterer
- Notable works: Graphic Story Magazine; Los Angeles Comic Book Company
- Awards: Alley Award, 1964; Inkpot Award, 1979

Bill Spicer (born October 1, 1937) is an American editor and publisher who spearheaded the 1960s movement away from commercial comics, opening the gateway to underground, alternative, and independent comics, notably with his publication Graphic Story Magazine.

== Biography ==
Born in Los Angeles, Spicer began reading science fiction fanzines in 1951–52. He learned professional lettering techniques while working at an ad agency from 1955 to 1967, and he became a letterer with Western Publishing in 1967. Three years earlier, he had entered the publishing arena himself after placing a want ad in a fanzine seeking contributors. After responses from artist Landon Chesney and others, he launched a 500-copy offset print run of Fantasy Illustrated #1 (February 1964) displaying a cover by Chesney and graphic stories in a variety of genres. This included an adaptation of Eando Binder's 1940s pulp novella "Adam Link's Vengeance", illustrated by D. Bruce Berry, which won the Best Fan Comic Strip award in the 1964 Alley Awards. With the third issue, an adaptation of Edgar Rice Burroughs' "The End of Bukawai" by Spicer and Harry Habblitz also won an Alley Award.

=== Graphic Story Magazine ===
With the introduction of the column "Graphic Story Review" by Richard Kyle, the focus began to shift to articles, reviews, and interviews in addition to the stories, resulting in a change to a new title, Graphic Story Magazine with issue #8 (Fall 1967). Issues #12 and #14 were devoted entirely to the work of Basil Wolverton. Interviews included Alex Toth (#10). Will Gould (#11), John Severin (#13), Gahan Wilson (#15) and Howard Nostrand (#16). After the run ended with issue #16, Spicer then launched Fanfare, a magazine devoted to all aspects of popular culture.

In 1971, Spicer partnered with Michael Moore and Fred Walker to form the Los Angeles Comic Book Company, which published Mickey Rat, L.A. Comics, Mutants of the Metropolis and the full-color Weird Fantasies.

=== Comic strips ===
Spicer continued as a Western Publishing letterer from 1967 to 1982. He also lettered for Dark Horse, Another Rainbow, Fantagraphics. From 1988 to 2005, he lettered manga for Viz. He also lettered two comic strips in the 1980s, Rick O'Shay and Conan the Barbarian. He was contracted by Richard Kyle to letter Jack Kirby's "Street Code", published 1990 in Argosy (magazine) issue two.

== Awards ==
In addition to his Alley Awards, Spicer won a 1979 Inkpot Award. In 2000, the American Association of Comicbook Collectors Fandom Service Award went to Spicer for his significant contribution to the hobby of comic book collecting and his pioneering work with EC fanzines.
