= Ken Bruzenak =

American comic book letterer (born 1952)

- Born: August 30, 1952 (age 74) Finleyville, Pennsylvania
- Area: Letterer
- Notable works: American Flagg! Mr. Monster; Azrael; Powers
- Awards: Harvey Award, 1988–1990

Ken Bruzenak (born August 30, 1952) is an American comic book letterer, primarily known for his work on Howard Chaykin’s American Flagg! Bruzenak's lettering and logowork was integral to the comic's futuristic, trademark-littered ambience. During the course of his career, Bruzenak has been closely associated with both Chaykin and Jim Steranko.

== Biography ==
=== Early life and career ===
Bruzenak grew up in Pennsylvania as a huge comic book fan. At age 17, he attended the Detroit Triple Fan Fair convention, where he met his hero Jim Steranko, and also crossed paths with Chaykin for the first time.

=== Steranko ===
After meeting Steranko a second time, Bruzenak took a job renovating Steranko's house in Reading, Pennsylvania. He stayed and worked at the house, along with another Steranko disciple, future comics artist Greg Theakston. Theakston was ostensibly there to assist Steranko on The Steranko History of Comics, volume two; Bruzenak was there to do construction. After about two years, Theakston left the project and Bruzenak took over as Steranko's primary assistant.

During this period, Steranko formed Supergraphics, his own publishing company, where among other things he published the magazine Comixscene (later retitled Mediascene, and finally Prevue). Bruzenak assisted Steranko on the first fifty issues of Comixscene/Prevue, as well as other concurrent projects, such as Marvel's official fan magazine, FOOM (Bruzenak was the associate editor); the illustrated novel Chandler: Red Tide, the comic book adaptation of the film Outland; and various paperback covers and posters.

Bruzenak's duties during this time were varied, basically comprising all aspects of publishing, from research, editing, copy-editing, and proof-reading; to lettering, paste-up, operating a stat camera, and other production skills. (Steranko's 1981 Outland adaptation, in fact, constituted Bruzenak's first professional lettering job.) In the end, Bruzenak worked for Steranko for almost thirteen years.

=== Chaykin ===
Bruzenak eventually left Steranko's employ to embark on a freelance lettering career. Artist Dan Adkins introduced Bruzenak to editors at DC and then Marvel, which at first didn't lead to anything. Bruzenak then lettered a couple of issues of Frank Brunner's Warp for First Comics, before landing the letterer job with Chaykin's American Flagg! in 1983.

Bruzenak's work on that title was more typography than simple lettering. The comic featured signage, multiple typefaces, robot type, and a mixture of formal type with balloon type for special effects. Bruzenak's lettering was so integral to the book, it virtually became a character of its own. Readers took notice — as did editors for other companies — and Bruzenak soon became the industry's first "celebrity letterer," getting more offers for jobs than he was able to take on — even with his famous non-stop work ethic.

In the years since both men left American Flagg! in 1986, Bruzenak has gone on to letter much of Chaykin's later work, including Time^{2} (1986), Blackhawk (1987), Black Kiss (1988), the short-lived second volume of American Flagg! (1988–1989), Wolverine/Nick Fury: The Scorpio Connection (1989), Twilight (1990–1991), Power and Glory (1994), and American Century (2001).

=== Post-Chaykin ===
Besides working on Chaykin's comics in the 1980s, Bruzenak stayed busy lettering a number of other First Comics titles, including E-Man, Jon Sable, and Nexus, as well as titles published by Marvel and DC. In the 90s, Bruzenak worked steadily, often pairing with Michael T. Gilbert on his Mr. Monster comics, but his work was never as much in demand as it was during his mid-80s heyday. From 1995 to 2002, Bruzenak lettered DC's Azrael series. In the 2000s, Bruzenak has lettered much of Michael Avon Oeming's Powers series. He was commissioned to provide lettering for Jack Kirby's "Street Code" when it was republished in 2000's Streetwise, published by TwoMorrows Publishing.

== Influences ==
Bruzenak cites long-time DC and Marvel letterer John Costanza as a major influence.

== Awards ==
Bruzenak won the coveted Harvey Award for Best Letterer three consecutive years, from 1988–1990, for his work on American Flagg!, Mr. Monster, and Black Kiss.
