= George Metzger =

Artist

- Born: 1939 (age 86–87) Illinois, U.S.
- Area: Cartoonist
- Notable works: Moondog

George Metzger (born 1939) is an American cartoonist and animator. He was an underground comics artist during the mid-1960s and early 1970s in California, eventually relocating to Canada, where he worked in animation.

== Biography ==
Born in rural Illinois, Metzger moved with his family to northern California when he was six years old. As a youth, he collected comic strips and read such authors as H. P. Lovecraft, Robert E. Howard, and Herbert Asbury. He studied the work of such book illustrators as Fritz Eichenberg, and Lynd Ward. His later work was influenced by his interest in Maxfield Parrish, Hannes Bok, EC Comics, and various science fiction illustrators.

After graduating from high school in 1957, he attended a two-year junior college, worked in forestry for two years and then returned to college. In the early 1960s, he contributed to fanzines and an underground newspaper, followed by a period in the National Guard.

Later, he lived in Santa Cruz, California and moved to San Jose, California, where he resided for many years near the San Jose State University campus. In the mid-to-late 1960s, he worked at Santa Clara's Hambley Studios, where he was a production serigraph printer for fine art print production of such artists as Corita Kent.

Metzger contributed to such publications as Gothic Blimp Works and Bill Spicer's Graphic Story Magazine. He eliminated dialogue balloons in "Mal-Ig" (Gothic Blimp Works #7); reprinted in Graphic Story Magazine, "Mal-Ig" was a strong influence on Paul Chadwick's The World Below.

Obsessively drawing every night, Metzger could be found at his drawing board while friends gathered and talked around him. In the early days of the original Star Trek, Metzger and several friends would gather every Wednesday evening to watch. Always a guest at the hippest parties in the Bay Area, he often carried a flask of brandy in his back pocket for all to share. He was friendly with the underground artists of the day, plus many Bay Area bluegrass and country musicians, as well as the Grateful Dead.

His best known creation is Moondog, a science-fantasy series notable for its sophisticated art and elaborate imaginative framework. Published by the Print Mint, it ran from 1969 until 1973. It has no connection with the character Moondog in Jim Meddick's comic strip Monty.

His story "Routine" was published in Graphic Story Magazine #16. The cover of Metzger's comic book Truckin (Print Mint, 1972) includes a self-portrait in the truck's mirror. In 1978, Kitchen Sink Press published Metzger's Mu, the Land that Never Was. That same year, he was a guest at San Diego Comic-Con.

Metzger later worked for several animation studios in Vancouver, including Marv Newland's International Rocketship Limited.

In 2016, Fantagraphics Books re-issued Metzger's graphic novel, Beyond Time and Again. In 2024, they released The Lost Worlds of George Metzger, a collection of Metzger's comics work including rediscovered stories.

== Awards ==
Metzger was the Artist Guest of Honor at Vancouver's Vcon 8 in 1980, invited back as the Artist GoH Emeritus in 2010.
