= Chamber of Chills =

Two anthology horror comic books

- Chamber of Chills #23 (May 1954), cover-art credits uncertain.

Publication information
- Publisher: Harvey Publications
- Schedule: Bimonthly
- Format: Ongoing series
- Publication date: June 1951 — December 1954
- No. of issues: 26

Creative team
- Artist(s): Bob Powell; Warren Kremer; Lee Elias; Rudy Palais; Howard Nostrand

Chamber of Chills is the name of two anthology horror comic books, one published by Harvey Publications in the early 1950s, the other by Marvel Comics in the 1970s.

== Harvey Publications ==
The first Chamber of Chills was a 10-cent horror anthology published bimonthly by Harvey Publications that ran 26 issues (cover-dated June 1951 - Dec. 1954).

Artists included Bob Powell, Lee Elias, Rudy Palais, Howard Nostrand, and Warren Kremer. Issue #7 is mentioned in Dr. Fredric Wertham's 1954 indictment of comic books Seduction of the Innocent (p. 389). Chamber ceased publication following the Senate Subcommittee on Juvenile Delinquency hearings of 1954. Harvey Comics then began concentrating on titles for young children, including Little Dot and Richie Rich.

Chamber of Chills was formerly Blondie Comics, taking over that comic's numbering with issue #21. After issue #24 (Dec. 1951), the numbering was reset to #1. Chamber of Chills became Chamber of Clues with the February 1955 issue, and ceased publication two issues later, the last cover-dated April 1955.

The 2023 Overstreet Comic Book Price Guide stated that Chamber of Chills #19 is the most valuable Horror comic. A near-mint copy is valued at $40,000. This is presumed due to the cover illustration by Lee Elias.

== Marvel Comics ==
An unrelated comic-book series titled Chamber of Chills was published by Marvel Comics in the 1970s. It ran 25 issues (Nov. 1972 - Nov. 1976).

The title was one of four launched by Marvel Comics editor-in-chief Roy Thomas to form a line of science fiction and horror anthologies with more thematic cohesiveness than the company's earlier attempts that decade, which had included such series as Chamber of Darkness and Tower of Shadows. Whereas those titles generally presented original stories, these new books would instead adapt genre classics and other works.

With the four titles' debuts set to be staggered over the course of four months, Marvel premiered Journey into Mystery vol. 2 (Oct. 1972), Chamber of Chills (Nov. 1972), Supernatural Thrillers (Dec. 1972), and, with a late start, Worlds Unknown (May 1973). The first issue features an original six-page story by science fiction novelist George Alec Effinger, "Moon of Madness, Moon of Fear", penciled by P. Craig Russell (then credited as Craig Russell), and a slightly retitled adaptation of the Harlan Ellison short story "Delusions for a Dragon Slayer", by writer Gerry Conway and artist Syd Shores; in-between was a story by writer Stan Lee and artist Russ Heath, "They Wait in Their...Dungeon", reprinted from Menace #1 (March 1953), from Marvel's 1950s forerunner, Atlas Comics.

The bimonthly series ran exclusively new material through issue #4, with one reprinted story added to the mix for the following two issues, and only one new story in issue #7, after which the series became all-reprint. Most of the reprinted stories were 1950s "pre-Code" horror stories, which the industry self-censorship organization the Comics Code Authority had forbidden on Code-approved comics until a loosening of the Code in 1971.

Other creators included novelist John Jakes, scripting "Spell of the Dragon", starring Brak the Barbarian (#2), with art by Val Mayerik and Dan Adkins, and adapting his own short story "The Opening of the Crypt", a sequel to Edgar Allan Poe's "The Cask of Amontillado", with art by Frank Brunner (#4); and Gardner F. Fox, a DC Comics veteran from the 1940s on, with a story each in #3 (art by Ernie Chan) and #4 (penciled by Howard Chaykin). Also contributing were Marvel regulars Steve Gerber, Tony Isabella, Larry Lieber, Don McGregor, and Doug Moench, as well as editor Thomas, adapting Robert E. Howard's "The Thing on the Roof", with artist Brunner (#3). Others include two writers better known for their work at rival DC, John Albano and Steve Skeates. Other artists included Don Heck, Jay Scott Pike, and Paul Reinman.

The 1950s reprints included work by artists Dick Ayers, Gene Colan, Tony DiPreta, Sam Kweskin, Mort Lawrence, Pete Morisi, Don Perlin, Bob Powell, Werner Roth, Robert Q. Sale, Joe Sinnott, and Pete Tumlinson. The latter part of the run began including late-1950s and early 1960s "Pre-superhero Marvel" stories by the likes of Jack Kirby and Steve Ditko, mixed with a handful of tales from the earlier 1970s horror comics. Cover artists included Gil Kane and John Romita, Sr.

== Sources ==
- Overstreet, Robert M.. Official Overstreet Comic Book Price Guide. House of Collectibles, 2004.
