= Monte Wolverton =

American editorial cartoonist

Monte Wolverton (1948, Vancouver, Washington) is an American editorial cartoonist who is best known for his satiric pages in Mad, his Weekly Wolvertoon website and his contributions as associate editor of The Plain Truth.

== Biography ==
As the son of cartoonist Basil Wolverton, he grew up in the Pacific Northwest, surrounded by imaginative illustrations and cartoons, and attended college in Los Angeles. In the early 1970s, he launched his career as a graphic designer and saw his first cartoon and comics published in CAR-toons, CB Radio, Creative Computing and Youth.

In the late 1970s, he relocated back to the Pacific Northwest for full-time freelancing in illustration, magazine art direction, advertising and publication design, corporate image and creative consulting. In 1985, he returned to California to serve as art director for The Plain Truth, taking on more editorial duties as the years passed. He expanded his editorial cartooning in the mid-1990s at the same time he began contributing to Mad, drawing ten pieces for the magazine between 1994 and 2002. His work is currently syndicated by Cagle Cartoons to over 800 newspapers.

Wolverton is also a painter, sculptor, and writer. He has authored two novels, "Chasing 120" (2014) and "The Remnant" (2016).

A member of the National Cartoonists Society and the Association of American Editorial Cartoonists, Wolverton lives in southwest Washington State with his wife Kaye.
