= Sky Masters =

American comic strip by Jack Kirby and Dave Wood

Sky Masters of the Space Force
- Sky Masters example, with each panel representing a level of the spaceship. It would have seen print horizontally. Published 01/30/59.
- Author(s): Dave & Dick Wood; Jack Kirby
- Illustrator(s): Jack Kirby & Wally Wood, Kirby & Dick Ayers
- Current status/schedule: Daily and Sunday; concluded
- Launch date: September 8, 1958
- End date: February 25, 1961
- Syndicate(s): George Matthew Adams Service (1958–1960)
- Genre(s): Adventure, science fiction

Sky Masters of the Space Force was an American syndicated newspaper comic strip created on September 8, 1958, by writer/artist Jack Kirby, artist Wally Wood and writer Dave Wood, featuring the adventures of an American astronaut. The strip stars the titular Major Skylar Masters—an American astronaut—and features his adventures in a fictionalized Space Race, including rocket launches, space stations, Moon landings, and double agents.

== Publication history ==
=== Conception ===
Sky Masters of the Space Force began life as a science fiction strip created by artist Jack Kirby and writer Dave Wood called Space Busters, which was designed to be sold to a newspaper syndicate. This strip did not sell, however.

In 1958, Harry Elmlark, "an agent from the George Matthew Adams Service", asked DC Comics editor Jack Schiff for a science fiction comic to be adapted into strip form, to capitalize on American interest in the Space race in the wake of the previous year's launch of Sputnik. Schiff rejected Space Busters and then either collaborated in the creation of a new strip, or simply encouraged Kirby and Wood to produce "a strip that dealt with rocket launchings, moon shots, and general story lines just a little ahead of current developments in the news".

=== Creation ===
Wally Wood's first wife Tatjana Wood recalled in the Wood biography Wally's World that it was Jack Kirby who sought out the science fiction artist to collaborate on Sky Masters. Wallace Wood had previously worked on EC's Weird Science, Weird Fantasy and Wood was invited by Will Eisner to collaborate on the Outer Space Spirit newspaper series. By the time Kirby was thinking about a space strip, Wood had given up comic book work for higher-paying magazine and advertising work, including Mad and illustrating science fiction stories in Galaxy, Worlds of If, and other American magazines and books. Wally Wood accepted Kirby's invitation.

With art samples and story outline approved by Elmlark, Kirby penciled the strip, which was initially written by brothers Dick and Dave Wood and inked by the unrelated Wally Wood; at that same time, Dave Wood was also working with Kirby on the Showcase Comics issues of Kirby's "Challengers of the Unknown" feature for DC Comics, and Wally Wood would later ink issues #4-8 of Kirby's Challengers of the Unknown comic book series during the last half of 1958 and the first half of 1959. Once Kirby and Schiff got into a dispute, Wally Wood moved on to other projects. Later Sky Masters strips were written by Kirby, and inked by Dick Ayers, with the final month penciled and inked by Kirby alone.

Ayers described his participation in a 1996 interview:

I also began [work on] Sky Masters, the newspaper strip. There is a lot of confusion on this; people think Wally Wood inked them all, because they're signed Kirby/Wood. But that was Dave Wood, the writer [who was unrelated to artist Wally Wood]. I began Sky Masters with the 36th Sunday page; Jack's pencils, my inks, in September of 1959. I ended the Sundays in January 1960. I also did the dailies for a period of [over] two years, from September of '59 to December of '61. These were complete inks; I was the only one doing it at the time. Of course, Wally Wood also worked on that strip, in the beginning, before me."

=== Conflict ===
Dave Wood promised Schiff "a percentage for arranging the deal", which Kirby allegedly assumed was a one-time payment but that Schiff understood to be on-going. In Spring 1958, pre-publication, Kirby verbally agreed to pay Schiff an ongoing percentage, in large part to safeguard his (Kirby's) lucrative relationship with DC. But confusion over whether the percentage should come from gross or net income (and the apparent expectation that Kirby would personally cover the strip's production costs) strained the relationship between Kirby and Schiff. Kirby also butted heads with writer Dave Wood, requesting a higher percentage of the royalties, ostensibly to cover costs of paying Wally Wood for inking. When Kirby threatened to leave the strip, Schiff implied Kirby should ink himself, and noted that Dave Wood required money to pay his brother, Dick, who was helping with the writing.

On April 15, 1958, Schiff drew up a formal agreement documenting the royalty cuts between Kirby and Wood, and also Schiff himself (4%). By July, Schiff requested a higher percentage before the strip debuted on September 8, 1958, in "over three hundred newspapers". With the arrival of the first royalty checks, the Wood brothers sent money to Schiff, but Kirby refused, leading to tension between himself and DC. In an attempt to defuse the situation, Kirby attempted to buy Schiff out of the contract, reiterating the feeling that Schiff was only due a onetime payment rather than an ongoing percentage of the royalties.

=== Legal challenge ===
Schiff refused the offer, and subsequently fired Kirby from Challengers of the Unknown, claiming that ideas from the Challengers story conferences were finding their way into Kirby's Sky Masters work. On December 11, 1958, Kirby discovered that Schiff was suing both him and the Woods for breach of contract, and counter-sued Schiff. Kirby claimed that Schiff was merely an editor who had "assigned him, the Wood brothers, and Eddie Herron freelance work", that Kirby and the Woods had visited Elmlark without Schiff, that Schiff was not involved in the agency agreement, but that he and the Woods had offered Schiff a gift. Kirby further alleged that Schiff had implied that not paying his demands would lead to Kirby losing work at DC.

Schiff's lawyer Myron Shapiro questioned Kirby at trial, and confirmed that Schiff had not verbalised such threats. Jack Liebowitz (executive vice president and general manager of National/DC) testified on Schiff's behalf, and the signed agreement promising Schiff an ongoing percentage led to Schiff being successful after a "very short trial at the supreme court in White Plains, New York". Kirby left then "market leader" DC, and returned to work for Atlas Comics, but continued to draw Sky Masters until early 1961.

== Episodes ==
Daily stories (8 September 1958 – 25 February 1961)

- "First Man in Space"
- "Sabotage"
- "Mayday Shannon"
- "The Lost Capsule"
- "Alfie"
- "Refugee"
- "Wedding in Space"
- "Message from Space"
- "Weather Watchers"
- "The Young Astronaut"

Sunday stories (8 February 1959 – 7 February 1960)

- "The Atom Horse"
- "Project Darkside"
- "Mister Lunivac"
- "Jumbo Jones"
- "The Yogi Spaceman"

== Reprints ==
A 1980 collection, Sky Masters of the Space Force: Book One, published by Quality Comic Art Productions of Buffalo, New York, reprinted the beginning of the strip and, while smaller in format, often featured artwork less modified by artists involved in the reprint production than the later Pure Imagination publications.

In 1991, Pure Imagination reprinted the dailies from 8 September 1958 to 8 May 1959 and the eight color Sundays from February to March 1959 as Sky Masters of the Space Force #1. From 1996 to 1998 the daily strips were reprinted by Manuscript Press in Comics Revue (#124–142, 144–153, and Comics Revue Special #1), and from 1998 to 2002 the remaining Sundays were reprinted in color on the front and back covers of odd-numbered issues (#145–191). Almost all of the Sky Masters strips (774 dailies and 53 of 54 Sundays) are reprinted in The Complete Sky Masters of the Space Force (1991) from Pure Imagination. The book features the Sunday strips in black and white only, and includes one daily on the back cover only rather than in-sequence.

A remastered Spanish edition containing the complete dailies was published by Glénat in two volumes in 2008 and 2009, edited and designed by Ferran Delgado. A planned third volume containing the complete Sundays remained unpublished until a 2018 collaboration with Amigo Comics and the Jack Kirby Museum.

In late 2017, Hermes Press published Sky Masters of the Space Force: The Complete Dailies. This was followed in 2018 by the Eisner Award nominated Sky Masters of the Space Force: The Complete Sunday Strips in Color from Amigo Comics, edited and designed by Ferran Delgado of the Spanish edition.
