= The Thing! =

Horror comic book

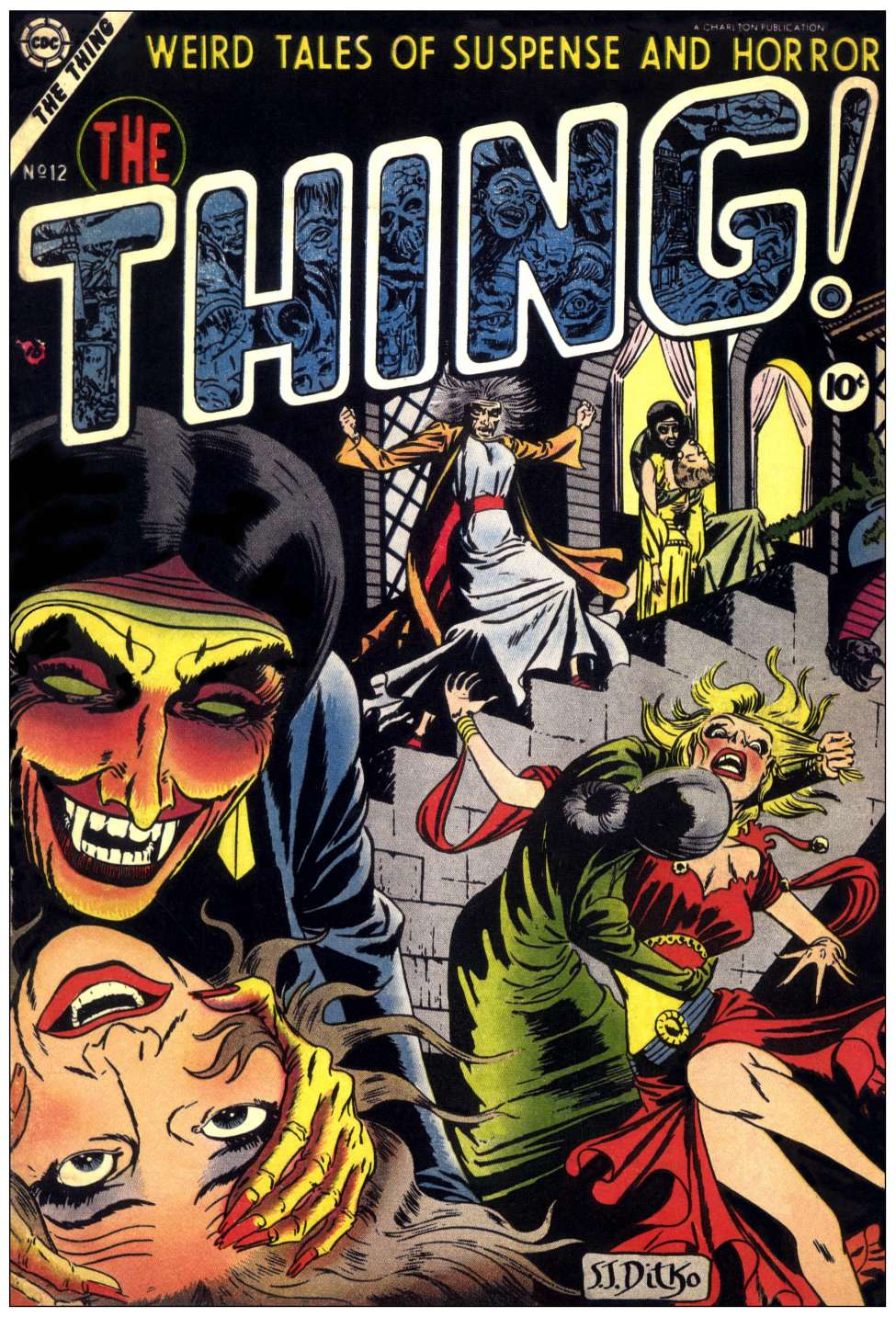
- The Thing #12 (Feb. 1954), featuring the first comic-book cover art by Steve Ditko.

Publication information
- Publisher: Charlton Comics
- Schedule: Bimonthly
- Format: Anthology
- Genre: Horror
- Publication date: Feb. 1952 – Nov. 1954
- No. of issues: 17

Creative team
- Artist(s): Steve Ditko

Collected editions
- Steve Ditko's The Thing!: ISBN 1-56685-028-2

The Thing! is an American horror comic book published by Charlton Comics that ran 17 issues from 1952 to 1954. Its tagline was "Weird tales of suspense and horror!" After the 17th issue, it was cancelled and the series' numbering continued as Blue Beetle vol. 2.

Artist Steve Ditko provided the covers for #12-15 and #17. He also illustrated stories in issues #12-15. Issue #12 features Ditko's first comic-book cover art.

In 2006, Pure Imagination released the trade paperback Steve Ditko's The Thing! that reprinted all of Ditko's stories from this title, and used the cover of #15 for its cover. The back cover shows the covers from The Thing! #12, #13 and #14 and Strange Suspense Stories #22. It also included Ditko stories from Charlton's Mysteries of Unexplored Worlds #5 and #11, Do You Believe In Nightmares #1, Strange Suspense Stories #36, and Unusual Tales #25.

In 2014, the UK publisher PS Artbooks reprinted the entire series in a two-volume hardcover edition.
