= Drums (comics) =

- Drums TPB (2016). Art by Raúl Allén.

Publication information
- Publisher: Image Comics
- Schedule: Monthly
- Format: Limited series
- Genre: Supernatural, Mystery, Horror, Zombies
- Publication date: May – September 2011
- No. of issues: 4
- Main character(s): FBI Agent Martin Irons; Michelle Hernandez; FBI Agent Poltz

Creative team
- Created by: El Torress, Abe Hernando
- Written by: El Torres
- Artist(s): Abe Hernando, Kwaichang Kraneo
- Colorist(s): Fran Gamboa
- Editor(s): Edward Sellner

Collected editions
- Drums (2016): ISBN 978-8416486380

Drums is a 2011 supernatural comic book limited series created by writer El Torres and artists Abe Hernando and Kwaichang Kraneo. Drums follows FBI special agent Martin Irons as sinister forces work against him while he investigates the mass homicide of practitioners at a Voodoo ceremony in Florida.

== Synopsis ==
The series follows FBI agent Martin Irons, who is tasked with investigating the deaths of a large group of people during a Santeria ceremonial ritual in Florida. When one of the seemingly dead victims rises as a zombie, Irons must find out what exactly is going on and why.

== Development ==
For the series, Torres brought in elements of several Afrocaribbean religions, mainly Cuban Santería, Brazilian Candomblé, Haitian Vodou, and New Orleans Voodoo. Torres admitted that they took liberties with the representations of these religions for "dramatic purposes" and that brought in other Afro-Caribbean religions to avoid the "well known" clichés about Voodoo.

In an interview with Bloody Disgusting, Torres states that Drums was inspired by his desire to do a modern twist of Voodoo zombies from the Golden and Silver age of comic books.

== Publication ==
The series was published by Image Comics as four issues released from May to September 2011. A collected trade paperback edition was released by Amigo Comics in August 2016.

== Reception ==
Critical reception for the series has been mixed, with Bloody Disgusting praising the first issue and CNN's Geek Out blog calling it one of the "best comics of the year". A reviewer for Nj.com stated that the "strength of the story is not in the presence of the supernatural though, it is the fact that the supernatural is presented as a tool. The spirits may be powerful, deadly, and evil, but without human help they have no power in our world". Broken Frontier called the comic "well crafted" but criticized that the story was "too familiar". CraveOnline also criticized the comic's familiarity, also citing that the artwork was "incredibly dull" and that the comic was "laid out like a bad SyFy movie".
