= Amigo Comics =

- Parent company: Behemoth Comics
- Status: Active
- Founded: 2012
- Founder: Juan "El" Torres
- Country of origin: Spain
- Distribution: Diamond Comic Distributors
- Publication types: Comics
- Fiction genres: Horror; Fantasy; Science fiction
- Official website: amigocomics.com

Amigo Comics was a Spanish company that published creator-owned comic books. However, despite being a Spanish company, its titles were solely published exclusively in the United States. Titles are also licensed out to other foreign publishers via foreign licensing agreements. In 2019, the company received its first Eisner nomination through the Best Archival Collection/Project—Strips category for their title Sky Masters of the Space Force: The Complete Sunday Strips in Color. In March 2020, the company agreed to an imprint deal with Behemoth that would see all future releases published through Behemoth in the US. The Amigo Comics company closed its activity in early 2021 due to the lack of payments from Behemoth Comics, and no further comics have been released.

== Titles ==
Comic books published by Amigo in the format of ongoing or limited series are:

- Alan Dracon, #1–4 (2016–2017)
- Apocalypse Girl
  - v1, #1–4 (2017–2018)
  - v2, #1–4 (2019–2020)
- Arkane Secrets, #1–3 (2013–2014)
- Barbara the Barbarian, #1–3 (2020)
- Beast No More - Metamorphosis (2017)
- The Blackening, #1–6 (2018–2019)
- The Cabinet of Doctor Caligari, #1–2 (2017)
- Crossover! (2019)
- Drums, TPB (2016), collects the 2011 Image Comics series.
- Ezequiel Himes: Zombie Hunter, #1–2 (2020)
- Gargantuan, #0–4 (2019)
- Ghost Wolf
  - v1, #1–4 (2014)
  - v2, #1–4 (2017–2018)
  - v3, #1–4 (2020)
- The Last Hunt, #1–4 (2017)
- Lunita, #1–4 (2013–2014)
- Metallic Silence, #1–2 (2015)
- Nancy in Hell
  - v1, #1–4 (2018–2020)
  - A Dragon in Hell (2014)
  - The Hell Gates (2020)
- Nasty Pills, #1–2 (2019)
- Phantasmagoria: The Ghost Lens, #1–3 (2018–2019)
- Planet of Demons: The Eye of Lucifer, #1–4 (2016–2017)
- Rise of the Tyrant (2020)
- Rogues!
  - v1, #1–6 (2013–2014)
  - v2 - The Cold Ship, #1–5 (2014)
  - v3 - The Burning Heart, #1–5 (2015–2016)
  - v4 - Odd Parenthood, #1–5 (2016)
  - v5 - Tales of Rogues, #1–6 (2018)
  - v6 - The Shadow Over Gerada, #1–2 (2018)
- Roman Ritual, #1–4 (2014–2015)
- Sindey Hammer
  - Sidney Hammer (2014)
  - Sidney Hammer versus the Wicker Wolf (2016)
  - Hidden Blood (2018)
- Straightjacket, #1–4 (2015–2016)
- Street Tiger, #1–4 (2017)
- Tales from the Suicide Forest (2016)
- Titan, #1–4 (2018)
- Unleash, #1–4 (2016–2017)
- The Westwood Witches, #1–4 (2013–2014)
