= Street Code =

Comic book

Street Code is both the short, ten page autobiographical comic story and the 2009 mini-comic by American writer-artist Jack Kirby. Both Bill Sienkiewicz and Jeff Zapata consider it among Kirby's greatest works, and it supplanted all other works in the minds of Jack and wife Roz. Roz appreciated it so much she framed the two-page spread from the story and gave it pride of place on her wall. It was commissioned by Richard Kyle in 1983 but did not see print until 1990 in Argosy vol.3 #2, with lettering by Bill Spicer. The story was shot from Kirby's pencils. Kyle intended to print it with a colored tone behind it, which Kirby requested not be too colorful, but rather drab to suit the times. Kyle said

"I was troubled by the production errors in "Street Code", ... I should have served Jack better. But, although a hundred comic editors could have asked for this story (or one like it) at any time in Jack's career, they never did. "Street Code" lives because of Argosy, and will be remembered because of Jack Kirby - and because it says what the graphic story could have been and may still become."

The strip has been printed on four occasions:

- Argosy vol. 3 #2 (Richard Kyle Publications) (1990) with lettering by Bill Spicer
- Streetwise (TwoMorrows Publishing) (2000) with lettering by Ken Bruzenak
- Kirby: King of Comics (Abrams Books) (2008) with lettering by Bill Spicer
- Street Code (Kirby Museum) (2009) with lettering by Jack Kirby
