= Carl Lundgren (illustrator) =

American artist and illustrator (born 1947)

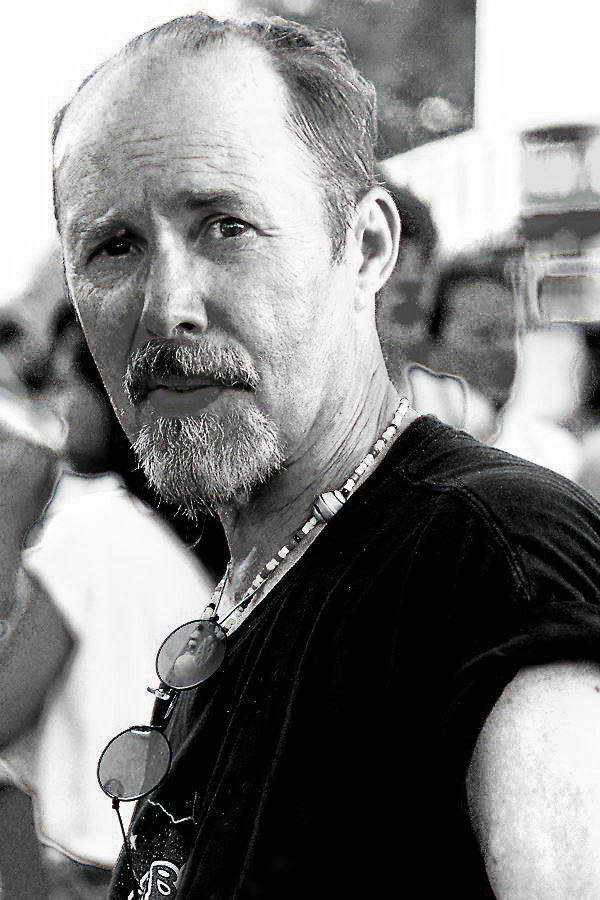
- Born: July 12, 1947 (age 79); Detroit, Michigan, United States
- Occupation: Illustrator
- Spouse: Michele Lundgren
- Website: www.carllundgren.com

Carl Lundgren (born July 12, 1947) is an American artist and illustrator, primarily known for his 1960s-era rock posters and fantasy art.

== Career ==
Born on July 12, 1947, in Detroit, Michigan, Lundgren had an early interest in becoming a fantasy artist and illustrator like Frank Frazetta, his idol. At the age of 18, he was co-chairman of the first multimedia science fiction convention, The Detroit Triple Fan Fair, featuring comics, movies and science fiction. He studied with the Famous Artists School correspondence course, for formal training.

In 1967 Lundgren met rock poster artist Gary Grimshaw, who was illustrating posters for a Detroit rock venue, run by Russ Gibb, called the Grande Ballroom. Grimshaw offered him a job, and Lundgren went on to create poster art for seminal bands such as The Who, Jefferson Airplane and Pink Floyd.

In 1974 Lundgren moved to New York City and turned to science fiction and fantasy illustration for a living, painting nearly 300 book covers. During this time, Lundgren became a co-founder of the Association of Science Fiction and Fantasy Artists (ASFA) and was nominated for a Hugo Award for his illustration work.

Lundgren quit working for the publishing industry in 1987, choosing to instead to focus on fine art. In 1993 he wrote and published an autobiography called Carl Lundgren, Great Artist.

In 2015 Hermes Press published a book by Lundgren on his posters titled The Psychedelic Rock Art of Carl Lundgren.

On August 10, 2023, Lundgren's wife Michele was arraigned in Michigan District Court 54-A for her part as an alleged fake elector for Donald Trump in the 2020 election.

== Bibliography ==
- Nirwana (1981) (Compiled by E. L. de Marigny, Jaime Martijn, and Annemarie Kindt, Illustrated by Alicia Austin)
