= Powerhouse Pepper =

- Powerhouse Pepper #4 (Sept. 1948), cover art by Basil Wolverton.

Publication information
- Publisher: Timely Comics
- First appearance: Joker Comics #1 (April 1942)
- Created by: Basil Wolverton

Powerhouse Pepper is a character in American humor comic books published in the 1940s by Timely Comics, a predecessor of Marvel Comics. Created by writer-artist Basil Wolverton, the character was a dim-witted but big-hearted boxer with superhuman strength, who appeared in slapstick adventures. His titular feature debuted in the humor anthology Joker Comics #1 (April 1942) and would appear in many anthology titles in the 1940s. His final appearance came in Spring 1948.

== Publication history ==
The feature "Powerhouse Pepper" debuted in Timely Comics' Joker Comics #1 (April 1942), and went on to appear in six- to eight-page stories in Joker Comics #2-27, 29-31 (April 1942 - May 1947, Fall 1947 - Spring 1948); Gay Comics #1, 18-22, 28-29 (March 1944, Fall 1944 - Winter 1945, Aug.-Nov. 1947); Tessie the Typist #2, 4, 7-13 (Winter 1944, Fall 1945, Fall 1946 - Dec. 1947); Rusty #14 (Aug. 1947); and Millie the Model #9 (Dec. 1947), as well as in his own series.

A single issue of that solo title appeared as Powerhouse Pepper Comics #1 (Jan. 1943), featuring a slightly different character design than elsewhere. The series then went dormant for five years while the character's adventures were published in the aforementioned titles. It was revived, slightly shortened to Powerhouse Pepper (as on its trademarked cover logo, though still copyrighted as Powerhouse Pepper Comics per its postal indicia), for four additional issues (#2-5, Spring - Nov. 1948). Backup features there included the humor characters Goofy Giggles, L'il Louie, Squeeky, and (in issue #2) Wolverton's detective Disk-Eyes the Dick.

== Synopsis ==
Comics historian Don Markstein called the series star, a bald, super-strong boxer in a striped turtleneck:

...an amazingly tough guy, and yet his ability to win any fight never goes to his head. He's kind, generous, and uninterested in worldly goods to the point where he once dug up an entire beach looking for a clam, and completely ignored the millions in buried treasure unearthed in the process. ... A major departure from the Popeye mold was Wolverton's constant wordplay. Powerhouse Pepper sailed through life in a sea of rhymes, rhythms and alliterations, often — usually, in fact — carried to ridiculous extremes.

== Reprints ==
Modern-day Powerhouse Pepper reprints include the eight-page story "McClaw the Outlaw" in the hardcover anthology A Smithsonian Book of Comic-Book Comics (Smithsonian Institution Press / Harry N. Abrams, 1981). Additional reprints have appeared in New Media Publishing's black-and-white magazine Golden Age of Comics #5 (Oct. 1983); publisher Kitchen Sink Press' adult-oriented Snarf #13 (Dec. 1989); and Pure Imagination's 1993 all-Wolverton comic-book Intense! #1-3 and The Human Powerhouse #1.
