= Fort Shelby Hotel =

- U.S. National Register of Historic Places
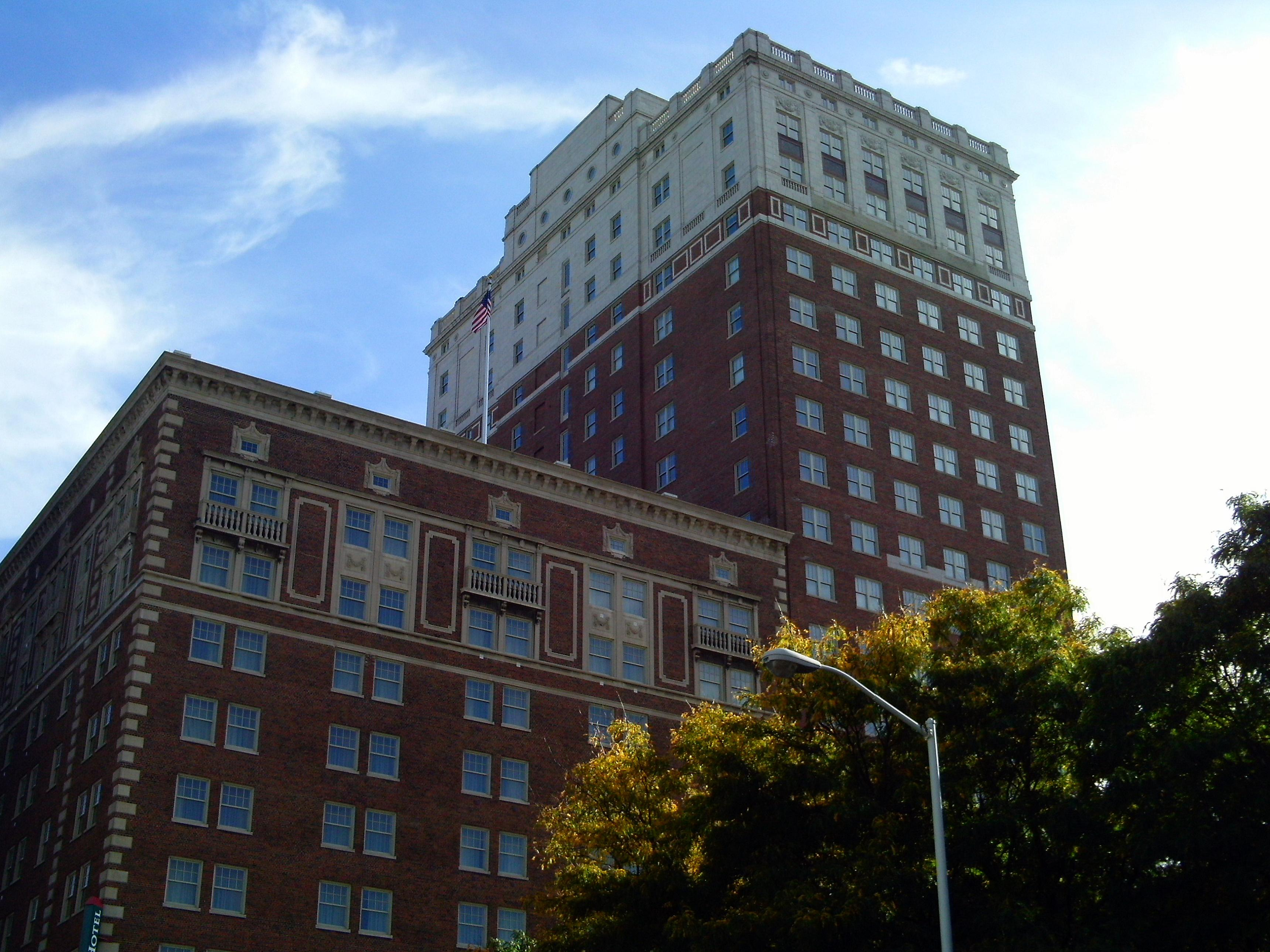
- Interactive map
- Location: 525 W. Lafayette Boulevard; Detroit, Michigan
- Coordinates: 42.3293°N 83.0531°W
- Built: 1916
- Architect: Schmidt, Garden & Martin; Albert Kahn & Assoc.
- Architectural style: Classical Revival, Georgian Eclectic, Beaux-Arts
- NRHP reference No.: 83003695
- Added to NRHP: November 25, 1983

The DoubleTree Suites by Hilton Hotel Detroit Downtown - Fort Shelby is a restored historic high-rise hotel, located at 525 West Lafayette Boulevard (at First Street) in Downtown Detroit, Michigan.

== History ==
In 1917, a group of investors sought to build an affordable hotel near Fort Street Union Depot. They hired Schmidt, Garden & Martin of Chicago to design the 10-story, 450-room hotel which opened that year as the Fort Shelby Hotel. The hotel was so successful that in 1926 they broke ground for the first of two planned 450-room expansions, the 27-story Albert Kahn–designed addition opened in 1927. However, the Great Depression halted plans for the second addition. In 1951, the Albert Pick Hotels Company purchased the property and renamed it The Pick-Fort Shelby.

An original mural by Louis Grell of Chicago was commissioned for the hotel lobby during the Albert Pick years. In the late 1960s and early 1970s, more business opted for newer suburban accommodations and the Pick-Fort Shelby struggled with low occupancy. Pick closed the hotel in 1973 and sold the building to three young investors who reopened it as The Shelby Hotel, a hotel/apartment complex geared toward youth in 1974, however, this was short-lived and it soon closed again. For many years, the Anchor Bar, a popular watering hole for workers at the nearby Detroit News and Detroit Free Press remained the only tenant until it relocated in 1994. The hotel was listed on the National Register of Historic Places in 1983.

Preliminary preparation for renovation work began in June 2006. It consisted of structural evaluations, asbestos removal, and environmental tests. MCP & Associates, a real estate investment and development firm, started work on this hotel in the spring of 2007. At a news conference on June 26, 2007, Ann Arbor Architectural firm Hobbs + Black Associates Inc. announced it would oversee renovations to the property. The renovations were led by Detroit-based L.S. Brinker, with the first floor Bar & Grill completed by Farmington Hills-based Mccarthy & Smith Inc.

The hotel reopened as the 'DoubleTree Guest Suites by Hilton Detroit Downtown - Fort Shelby on December 15, 2008. The restored hotel contains 203 guest suites, 56 apartments on the upper floors, a 21,000-square-foot (2,000 m^{2}) conference center with two ballrooms and 17 Breakout rooms.

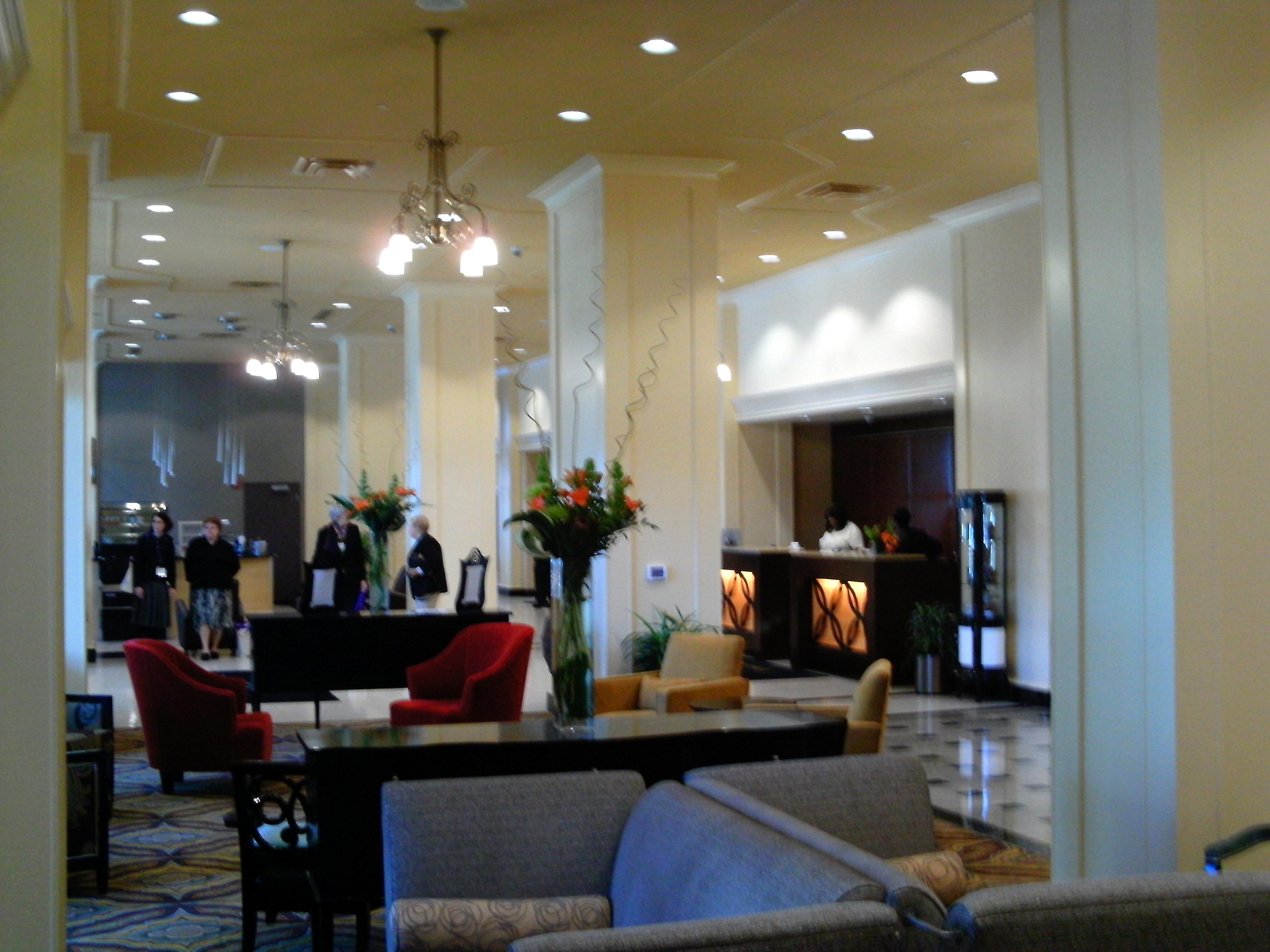
Fort Shelby Hotel Lobby
