= Howard Nostrand =

American cartoonist

- Howard Nostrand posing for illustration reference
- Born: May 13, 1929 Hoboken, New Jersey
- Died: August 1, 1984 (aged 55) New York, New York
- Areas: Cartoonist, Artist

Howard Nostrand (May 13, 1929–August 1, 1984) was an American cartoonist and illustrator best known for his 1950s comic book stories and his 1959-60 syndicated comic strip Bat Masterson, based on the television series.

== Biography ==
=== Early life ===
This 1974 magazine cover was Nostrand's first humorous horror art since his stories for Harvey Comics' Flip in the early 1950s.

Howard Nostrand was born in Hoboken, New Jersey. In 1932, his family moved to Hempstead, New York, where he graduated from high school in 1946. After working for his father's furniture construction and restoration business, painting gold leaf, scroll work and other embellishments, he attended the Art Career School. "It didn't teach very much of anything," Nostrand recalled in 1974, so "I left after one semester."

=== Comic books ===
In 1948, through one of his father's friends, Nostrand found work as an assistant to comic book artist Bob Powell, who drew for Harvey Comics and Fiction House. Nostrand recalled working alongside his fellow assistants, background artist George Siefringer and "Martin Epp, who inked, lettered and helped George on backgrounds. I started out inking and then got into doing backgrounds... and then penciling." Nostrand worked for Powell on features that included "Red Hawk" in Magazine Enterprises' Straight Arrow and "Bobby Benson's B-Bar-B Riders", based on the children's television series, in the same publisher's comic book of that title, but it was the horror comics that Harvey would begin publishing in the early 1950s that would feature some of Nostrand and Powell's finest comic art. For Fawcett Comics, he did work in Hot Rod Comics, an adaptation of the 1951 John Huston film The Red Badge of Courage and "a couple of Westerns", including the movie spin-off feature "Lash LaRue". Writer and artist credits were not routinely given in comics during this time; historians cite as Nostand's first confirmed full inking work the seven-page Powell-penciled horror story "Servants of the Tomb" in Harvey's Witches Tales #6 (Nov. 1961).

Nostrand left Powell in March 1952 and found work with Harvey Comics editor Sid Jacobson. "I think the first job I did for Harvey was a story called 'Man Germ', written by a fellow named Nat Barnett... about a trip through the interior of a person's body. Turns out this fellow as a germ, though, and the body expires. Cute." Nostrand also worked on Harvey's short-lived 3-D comics, as well as on such horror titles as Black Cat Mystery, Chamber of Chills, Tomb of Terror and Witches Tales.

Since EC comics were leading the way in the horror comics genre of the day, most publishers were advising their artists to adopt a similar style and in some cases outright art swipes from Tales From the Crypt and other comics published under the Entertaining Comics banner. Nostrand did a flawless imitation of Jack Davis and in one case completely redrew a sequence by Wally Wood from EC's Two-Fisted Tales but changed the positioning and layout of every panel. Wood and other EC artists praised Nostrand's work and saw that he was talented enough not to do outright swipes, but only work influenced by other artists.

With the mid-1950s slump in comic books that followed the Senate hearings on juvenile delinquency and the creation of the Comics Code. Nostrand turned to commercial art. In a 1974 autobiographical magazine article, he recalled:

I was pretty well washed-up in comics. I did manage to scrounge a couple of jobs once in a while, but the handwriting was on the wall... I decided instead of becoming a famous cartoonist, I would become a famous illustrator. I started doing samples. This was a very bleak period in my life. After doing comics for five or six years, I found it difficult to adapt myself to working in new media. All the training I'd had was directed at producing comic book art, and there wasn't any market for it. I was informed that my linework 'looked like Flash Gordon'. Two years earlier it would have been considered a compliment; now it was like a goddamn albatross around my neck.

He eventually found a staff position at the New York commercial art firm Penthouse Studios (no relation to Penthouse magazine) at Eighth Avenue and West 58th Street.

== Comic strip ==
With writer Ed Herron, he produced the 1959-60 syndicated comic strip Bat Masterson, based on the television series, on which he was assisted by artist Neal Adams.

In 1975, he returned to comic books with stories for Atlas/Seaboard Comics (Targitt), and Marvel (Vampire Tales), followed by more than a dozen contributions to Cracked. His last recorded comics work was the back-cover gag, "Great Moments in Technology: Marcus Bulovas Invents the Wristwatch", of Cracked #172 (October 1980).

In the 1980s, Nostrand returned to the EC swipe/Jack Davisesque style he had used in Harvey horror comics of the 1950s and did several parody stories for National Lampoon magazine, featuring characters like the Old Fag Hag.

== Awards ==
Nostrand won an award in the 1960s from the American Institute of Graphic Arts for his subway poster showing a cigar-puffing gangster.
