= Basil Wolverton =

American cartoonist

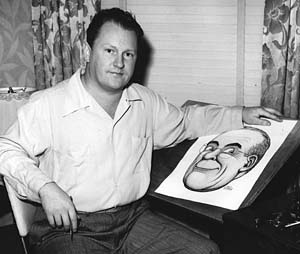
- Basil Wolverton at his drawing board, c. 1950
- Born: July 9, 1909 Central Point, Oregon, U.S.
- Died: December 31, 1978 (aged 69) Vancouver, Washington, U.S.
- Areas: Cartoonist, Writer, Penciller, Inker, Letterer
- Notable works: Powerhouse Pepper, Spacehawk
- Awards: Jack Kirby Hall of Fame
- Relatives: Monte Wolverton (son)

Basil Wolverton (July 9, 1909 – December 31, 1978) was an American cartoonist and illustrator known for his intricately detailed grotesques of bizarre or misshapen people. Wolverton was described as "Producer of Preposterous Pictures of Peculiar People who Prowl this Perplexing Planet." His many publishers included Marvel Comics and Mad magazine.

His drawings have elicited a wide range of reactions. Cartoonist Will Elder said he found Wolverton's technique "outrageously inventive, defying every conventional standard yet upholding a very unusual sense of humor. He was a refreshing original." However, there are some negative responses such as when Jules Feiffer stated, "I don't like his work. I think it's ugly."

He was posthumously inducted into the comic book industry's Jack Kirby Hall of Fame in 1991.

== Biography ==
=== Early life and career ===
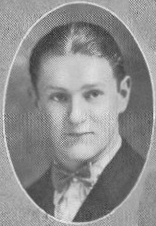
Wolverton as a senior in high school, 1927.

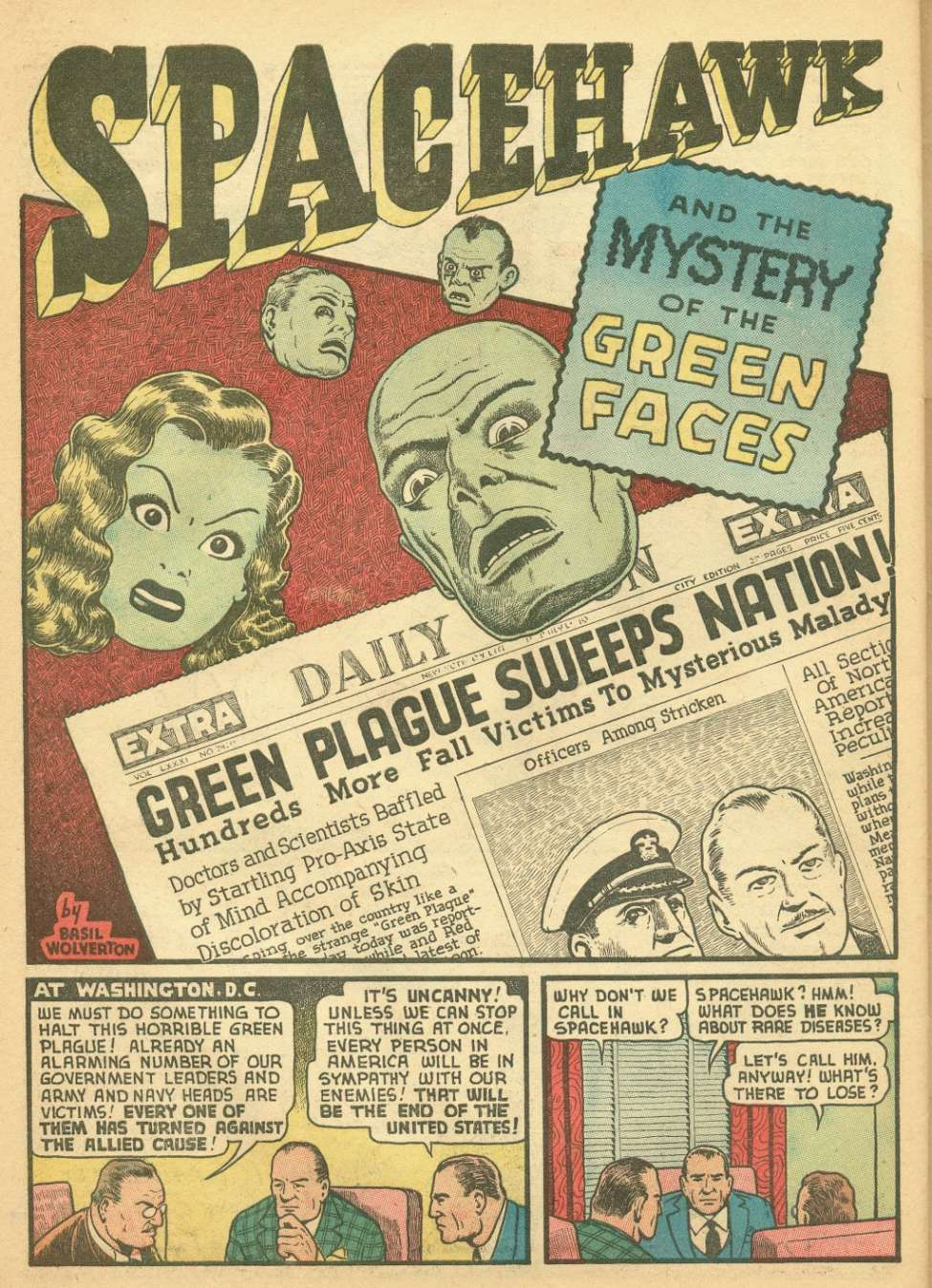
Target Comics v3 7, art by Basil Wolverton, September 1942.

Born in Central Point, Oregon, he later moved to Vancouver, Washington, and worked as a vaudeville performer and a cartoonist and reporter for the Portland News. At age 16 he sold his first nationally published work and began pitching comic strips to newspaper syndicates. His comic strip, Marco of Mars, was accepted by the Independent Syndicate of New York in 1929 but never distributed because it was deemed too similar to Buck Rogers, which debuted that year.

In 1936, Basil had sent four samples to the Walt Disney Animation Studios to apply for the Mickey Mouse comic strip, but was rejected. The strips would eventually be printed in Graphic Story Magazine #12 in 1970 and later cleaned up and reformatted by Greg Sadowski.

Disk-Eyes the Detective and Spacehawks were published in 1938 in Circus comics. In 1940, Spacehawk (a different and improved feature) made its debut in Target Comics, published by Novelty Press. It ran for 30 episodes (262 pages) until 1942.

Other Wolverton characters include Scoop Scuttle, a newspaperman who ran as a backup feature in Lev Gleason Publications' Daredevil Comics and Silver Streak Comics; and Mystic Moot and his Magic Snoot in Fawcett Publications' Comic Comics and Ibis The Invincible. "Bingbang Buster and his Horse Hedy" was a three-page backup story in Lev Gleason's Black Diamond Western #16–28 (1950–1952).

=== Powerhouse Pepper and Lena the Hyena ===
Wolverton's humor feature Powerhouse Pepper, about a superstrong if none-too-bright boxer, appeared in various comic books published by Timely Comics, the 1930s and 1940s precursor of Marvel Comics, from 1942 through 1952. The strip was characterized by alliterative, rhyming dialogue, screwball comedy and throwaway gags in background. The Timely titles, such as Joker Comics, Gay Comics and Tessie the Typist, debuted a number of his spin-off characters and features, including Flap Flipflop, The Flying Flash (who later appeared in Charlton Comics' Jack in the Box #13), Leanbean Green, "Cartoon Crime Mystery" featuring Inspector Hector the Crime Detector, Doc Rockblock, "Picture Poems about Peculiar People", "Funny Boners", Dauntless Dawson, "Hothead Hotel", "Bedtime Bunk", "Foolish Faces" and more.

Five issues of a Powerhouse Pepper comic book were released in 1943 and 1948 by Timely, but not all the covers were by Wolverton and many interior pages were also not devoted to Wolverton strips.

Li'l Abner daily strip by Al Capp, introducing Basil Wolverton's "Lena the Hyena"

In 1946, Wolverton won a contest to depict "Lena the Hyena", the world's ugliest woman, a running gag in Al Capp's Li'l Abner newspaper strip where Lena remained unseen beneath an editorial note stating her face had been covered to protect readers. Capp, responding to popular demand, announced a contest for artists to submit their interpretations. Among 500,000 entries, Wolverton's was the winner; it appeared in a Li'l Abner daily and Life magazine. Wolverton's fame briefly led to Life and Pageant printing his caricatures. The Lena portrait typified the unique "spaghetti-and-meatballs school of design" style he employed regularly thereafter.

In the 1950s, Wolverton produced 17 comic-book horror and science-fiction stories for Marvel and other comic-book publishers, including one story by author Daniel Keyes, which led to him being "hailed for creating uniquely grotesque monsters". Among these tales were "The Brain-Bats of Venus" for Mister Mystery #7 and "Where Monsters Dwell" in Marvel's Adventures into Terror #7, the title of which was later used for a 1970s Marvel reprint series.

=== Mad ===
Wolverton first appeared in Mad with a single panel in #10, drew Mad Reader! for #11 and also contributed an iconic Lena-like image to the cover of #11, which was billed as the "Beautiful Girl of the Month". Although Wolverton contributed sporadically to the title—appearing in just nine issues over two decades—his work was memorable enough that, in 2009, The New York Times dubbed him "The Michelangelo of Mad Magazine". E.C.'s other humor title, Panic, edited by Al Feldstein (who later became Mad's editor for 30 years) also used Wolverton's art on a Panic cover, though publisher William M. Gaines was not a fan of Wolverton's work. Other humor magazines from other companies such as Cracked, From Here to Insanity and Cockeyed also featured Wolverton's work, as did an issue of Ballyhoo.

=== Later career ===
Beginning in 1958, Wolverton wrote and illustrated an abridged version of The Old Testament stories under the titles "The Bible Story" and (beginning with chapter 121 in November 1968) "The Story of Man", serialized in 133 chapters from November 1958 to November 1969 in the magazine The Plain Truth, and continued for another 23 chapters in the magazine Tomorrow's World from January 1970 to April 1972. From 1961 to 1968 the first ninety-nine chapters of The Bible Story were collected in six volumes published by Ambassador College Press, and from 1982 to 1988 the complete 156 chapters (as 154 chapters, with 47/48 and 56/57 combined) were collected in six volumes published by the Worldwide Church of God. In February 2009, the illustrations which accompanied the text were collected by Fantagraphics in The Wolverton Bible, along with sixteen illustrations of the Book of Revelation (originally accompanying articles in The Plain Truth, and reprinted in two booklets, Prophecy and The Book of Revelation Unveiled at Last), a foreword by Grant Geissman, and an introduction by his son, Monte Wolverton.

In 1965, Wolverton did the Ugly Stickers series of trading cards for Topps, displaying his trademark twisted headshots.

In 1973, he returned to mainstream comics, illustrating several covers for Joe Orlando's satiric Plop! at DC Comics. Comix Book, a joint production of Marvel Comics and Denis Kitchen's Kitchen Sink Press, featured two strips by Wolverton, "Calvin" and "Weird Creatures".

== Personal life ==
In 1934, Wolverton married his Vancouver High School classmate Honor Lovette (class of 1927). They remained married until his death.

Wolverton was baptized into Herbert W. Armstrong's Radio Church of God in 1941 and was ordained as an elder in 1943. As a board member of that church, he was one of the six people, including Armstrong and his wife, who reincorporated the church in 1946 when it moved from its original headquarters in Oregon to California.

Wolverton died on December 31, 1978, at age 69.

Wolverton's son, editorial cartoonist Monte Wolverton, has worked for The Plain Truth and contributed to Mad.

== Bibliography ==
=== Books ===
Books by Wolverton or collecting his work include:

- The Bible Story v1–6 (1961–1968); reprinted 1982–1988
- Wolvertoons: The Art of Basil Wolverton (1990) (ISBN 1-56097-022-7)
- Wolverton in Space (1997) (ISBN 1-56971-238-7)
- Basil Wolverton's Powerhouse Pepper (2001) (ISBN 1-56097-148-7)
- The Basil Wolverton Reader Vol.1 (2003) (ISBN 1-56685-017-7)
- The Basil Wolverton Reader Vol.2 (2004) (ISBN 1-56685-027-4)
- Basil Wolverton: Agony & Ecstasy (2007) (ISBN 1-56685-041-X) (reprints from The Bible Story)
- The Original Art of Basil Wolverton (2007) (ISBN 978-0-86719-687-0)
- The Wolverton Bible (2009) (ISBN 978-1-56097-964-7)
- The Culture Corner (2010) (ISBN 978-1-60699-308-8)
- Spacehawk (2012) (ISBN 978-1-60699-550-1)
- Creeping Death from Neptune: The Life and Comics of Basil Wolverton Vol. 1 (2014) (ISBN 978-1-60699-505-1)
- Brain Bats of Venus: The Life and Comics of Basil Wolverton Vol. 2 (2019) (ISBN 978-1-68396-214-4)
- Scoop Scuttle and His Pals: The Crackpot Comics of Basil Wolverton (2021) (ISBN 978-1-68396-397-4)
