= Charles Plymell =

American poet

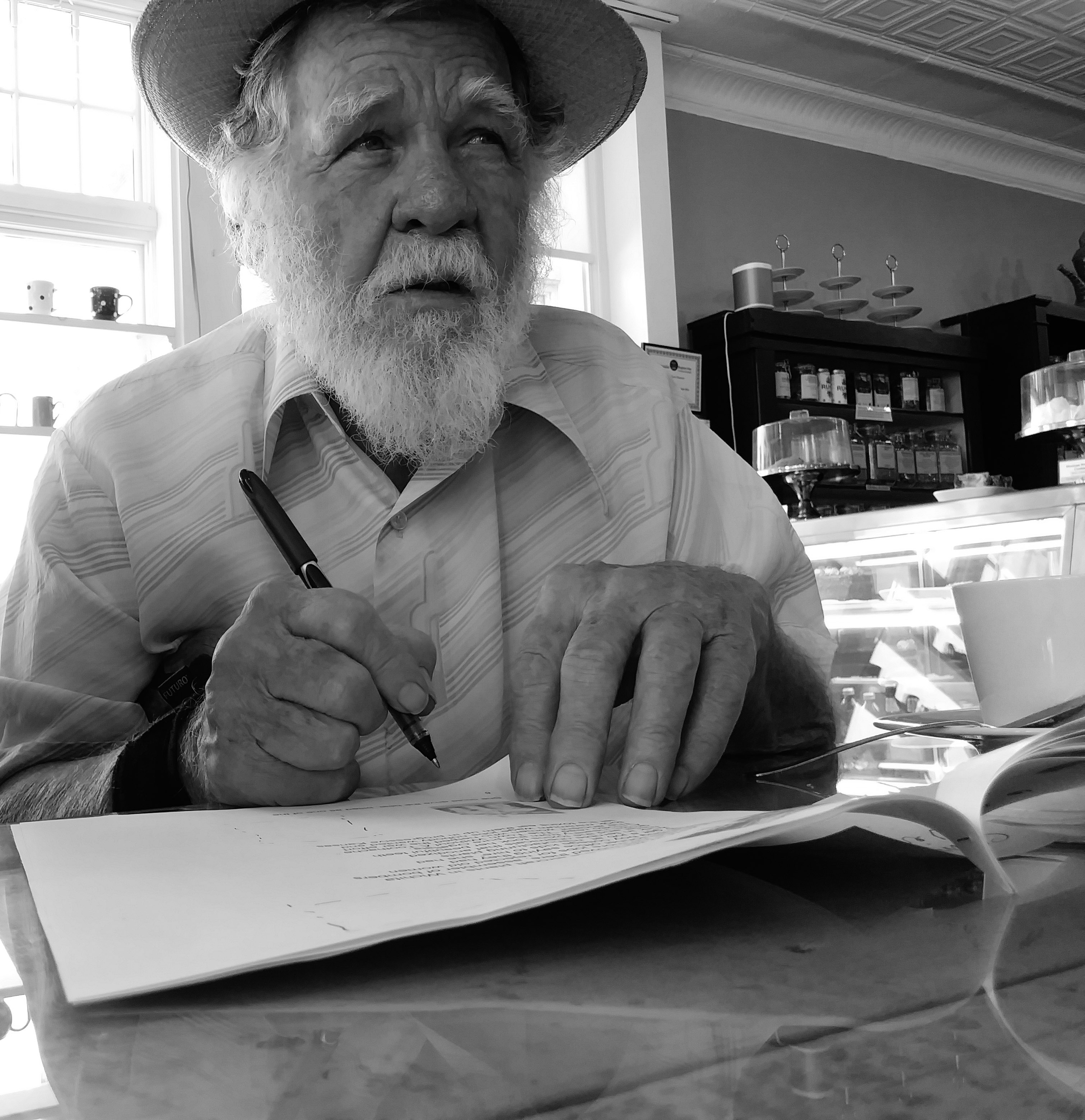
- Plymell, 2017
- Born: Charley Plymell; April 26, 1935 (age 91); Holcomb, Kansas, U.S.
- Occupations: Poet, publisher, author
- Writing career
- Movements: Postmodernism, underground comix

Charles Plymell (born April 26, 1935) is an American poet, novelist, and small press publisher. Plymell has been published widely, collaborated with, and published many poets, writers, and artists, including principals of the Beat Generation.

He has published, printed, and designed many underground magazines and books with his wife Pamela Beach, a namesake in avant-garde publishing. He published former prisoner Ray Bremser and Herbert Huncke, whom he identified with from the hipster 1950s. He was influential in the underground comix scene, first printing Zap Comix artists such as Robert Crumb and S. Clay Wilson, whom he first published in Lawrence, Kansas.

Plymell received a citation for being a distinguished poet by Governor Joan Finney of Kansas and was cited in the 1976 World Book Encyclopedia as a most promising poet.

== Biography ==
=== Early life ===
Charley Douglass Plymell was born in Finney County, Kansas during the worst dust storms of that time. He was born in a converted chicken coop near Holcomb. His grandfather, Charley Plymell, was deeded a homestead in Apache Palo lands by President Grover Cleveland. The stage line began in Plymell, a few miles south of Garden City where now stands the Plymell Union Church and Pierceville-Plymell Elementary School. Like many, his face was covered by wet rags as his mother went out to shoot jackrabbits and gather cacti for meals.

His father and mother were later divorced, and his father bought a home for Charles and his sisters so they could attend school in Wichita while his father traveled. In Wichita in the 1950s Plymell dropped out of his first year at Wichita North High School, lied about his age, traveled the western states in a new car his father bought him, working on pipelines, dams, factories and riding bareback broncs and Brahma bulls in rodeos.

Returning to Wichita he became a hipster, taking peyote, marijuana, and benzedrine, the drugs of the day. He listened to jazz, R&B, and “Race music” across the tracks in Wichita. He worked at factories and took courses at Wichita State University. Allen Ginsberg credited him with creating the "Wichita Vortex." Plymell's Vortex in his own words does not relate to Ginsberg's "Wichita Vortex Sutra" but took place west of Wichita near the center of the U.S. at Space Needle Crossing in the Chalk Pyramids. His Vortex is spiritual/mythical and based on when he heard the Voice of the Game Lord, which he later authenticated through his mentor and influence, Loren Eiseley. His other influences included Hart Crane, Ezra Pound, Robert Ronnie Branaman, and Samuel Coleridge. He did not meet the Beats until 1963 when associated with Ginsberg, Neal Cassady, and William S. Burroughs. His Vortex is written about in his Tent Shaker Vortex Voice. Before that he considered himself a hipster and outsider.

=== Career ===
Plymell moved to a quiet Russian neighborhood in 1962 at the corner of Haight and Ashbury in San Francisco. After the neighborhood filled with hippies and was taken over, Plymell moved to a famous flat, 1403 Gough Street. It was there at Plymell's LSD party that the Beats met the Hippies. Promptly Allen Ginsberg and Neal Cassady moved in with him where Plymell played Bob Dylan to Ginsberg for the first time. It was during that time Plymell made two films that were shown at the Ann Arbor Film Festival and his collages, which opened at the "Batman Gallery" where fellow Wichitans Bob Branaman and Bruce Conner had shown. Plymell's show sold out except for a few pieces that ended up in Australia. Billy "Batman" Jahrmarkt gave Plymell his classic 1951 MGTD. His work Robert Ronnie Branaman, published in 1964, is credited with being an early example of underground comix.

Recently Plymell's book Benzedrine Highway was published by Norton Records/Kicks Books. He has been writing poems used as songs by Andrea Schroeder (Berlin); Mike Watt & Sam Dook (U.K.) They recently featured one of his songs on their CUZ tour. He has also written songs for Clubberlanggang, and is working on a book with his poems for Neal Cassady and Bob Branaman put to rockabilly by Bloodshot Bill of Norton Records. Plymell holds an M.A. Degree in Arts and Sciences from Johns Hopkins University.

In 1967, Plymell created The Last Times, a tabloid underground newspaper published in San Francisco. It lasted only two issues, but included work by William Burroughs, Claude Pelieu, Allen Ginsberg, and Charles Bukowski. The Last Times featured William Burroughs' text Day the Records Went Up, (Note: A version of which later appeared in Evergreen Review, November 1968.) Claude Pelieu's Do It Yourself & Dig It, Allen Ginsberg's poem "Television Was A Baby Crawling Toward that Deathchamber", (Note: Also published in Ginsberg's book T.V. Baby Poems, London: Cape Goliart Press, 1967.) and a Charles Bukowski column. (Note: Collected in his Notes of a Dirty Old Man, reprinted from the Los Angeles-based underground journal Open City.) The Last Times #1 and 2 also contained articles by French avant-gardist Jean-Jacques Lebel and Man Suicided by Society by Antonin Artaud, translated by Mary Beach, Plymell's mother-in-law. Issue #1 also contains the first Plymell printed work of R. Crumb that Plymell had "lifted" from the second issue of Yarrowstalks (a Philadelphia-based underground newspaper).

Plymell subsequently earned a bit of immortality in the underground press by publishing only the first printing of Robert Crumb's Zap Comix #1, which Don Donahue took over from Plymell when he purchased his Multilith 1250 printing press soon after.

== Books ==
- Apocalypse Rose, Auerhahn Press, 1967
- Neon Poems, Atom Mind Publications, 1970
- The Last of the Moccasins, City Lights Books, 1971; Mother Road Publications, 1996
- The Trashing of America Phase 1, Tuvoti, 1973
- Over the Stage of Kansas, Telephone Books, 1973
- The Trashing of America, Kulchur Foundation, 1975
- Blue Orchid Numero Uno, Telephone Books, 1977
- Are you a Kid?, Cherry Valley Editions, 1977
- Moccasins Ein Be*Cut Here, at-Kaleidoskop, Europaverlag, 1980
- Panik in Dodge City, Expanded Media Editions, 1983
- The Harder They Come, Am Here Books 1985
- Forever Wider, 1954–1984, Scarecrow Press, 1985
- Was Poe Afraid?, Bogg Publications, 1990.
- journals of Lysidia, Synesthesia Press, 1999
- Reefer Madness in the Age of Apostasy, Butcher Shop Press 2000.
- Hand on the Doorknob, Water Row Books, 2000
- in Memory of My Father, Cherry Valley Editions, 2003
- Cut Here, 12 Gauge Press, 2002
- Song for Neal Cassady, 12 Gauge Press, 2002
- Bennies From Heaven, 12 Gauge Press, 2002
- Rabid Ronnie Rap Back Jive Kansas, 1955, 12 Gauge Press, 2002
- Some Mothers' Sons, Cherry Valley Editions, 2004
- Neal and Anne on Gough Street, The Beat Scene Press, 2007
- News, Glass Eye Books, 2007
- Beginning Millenium: No More Vinyl Bush War, Glass Eye Books, 2008
- The Lost Poems of Charley Plymell, M Press, 2010
- Eat Not Thy Mind, Eye Books Ecstatic Peace Library, 2010
- Curricula Me Vita, Glass Eye Books/Ecstatic Peace/Cherry Valley Editions 2011
- Animal Light, Verlag Peter Engstler, 2012
- Tent Shaker Vortex Voice, Bottle of Smoke Press, 2012
- Benzedrine Highway, Kicks Books, 2013
- Planet Chernobyl, Verlag Peter Engstler, 2015
- Apocalypse Rose, Lenka Lente, 2015
- Incognito, Ergo Sum, Ragged Lion Press, 2016
- Over the Stage of Kansas: New & Selected Poems 1966-2023, Bottle of Smoke Press, 2024

== Discography ==
- Rod McKuen Reads in Memory of My Father, Cherry Valley Editions, Vinyl, 1978.
- Man Overboard, Charles Plymell (Voice), The Clubber Lang Gang, CD, 2012.
- Blackbird by Andrea Schroeder, "Bebop Blues", Glitterhouse Records, Berlin, 2012
- Where The Wild Oceans End by Andrea Schroeder, "The Rattlesnake", Glitterhouse Records, Berlin, 2014
- Tamatebako by CUZ, "Sand and Bones", bleeding heart recordings, UK, 2014.
- Cuz, Mike Watt & Sam Dook, Bad Veronica, Charles Plymell (Voice), UK, 2015.
- Animal Light, Charles Plymell (Voice), Verlag Peter Engstler, CD, 2015
- Planet Chernobyl, Charles Plymell (Voice), Verlag Peter Engstler, Germany, CD, 2015
- Void by Andrea Schroeder, "Was Poe Afraid?" Glitterhouse Records, Berlin, 2016
- Apocalypse Rose, poem bilingual text; music CD by Bill Nace, Lenka Lente, Nantes, France, 2016.
- Bloodshot Bill Sings Charles Plymell, Feeding Tube Records and Bottle of Smoke Press, 2017.
- Apocalypse Rose, Charles Plymell (Voice), Bill Nace (music), openmouthrecords, 2017

== Anthologies ==
- Mark in Time, New Glide Publications, San Francisco, CA, 1971.
- And The Roses Race Around Her Name, Stonehill, NYC, 1975.
- Turpentin on the Rocks, Maro Verlag, Augsburg, W. Germany, 1978.
- A Quois Bon, Le Soleil Noir, Paris, France, 1978.
- Planet Detroit, Anthology of Urban Poetry, Detroit, MI, 1983.
- Second Coming Anthology, Second Coming Press, San Francisco, CA, 1984.
- The World, Crown Publishers, 1991.
- Editors' Choice III, The Spirit That Moves Us, New York, 1992.
- The Age of Koestler, The Spirit of the Wind Press, Kalamazoo, MI, 1990.
- Found & Lost Magascene, Vol. 1 / No. 0 & 1 [Contributor], Back Room/Temple of Man, 2010
