= A Short History of America =

1979 comic by Robert Crumb

- Original version (1979)
- Story: Robert Crumb
- Ink: Robert Crumb
- Date: Fall 1979
- Pages: 4
- Layout: 12 panels (updated to 15 in 1988)
- First publication: CoEvolution Quarterly no. 23

"A Short History of America" is a 1979 comic by American cartoonist Robert Crumb, first published by CoEvolution Quarterly and later reprinted that same year in Snoid Comics by Kitchen Sink Press. The work depicts the transformation of the American wilderness into a state of urban decay caused by human development while reflecting the green, environmental themes popular with the counterculture of the 1970s. It is considered one of Crumb's most famous works outside his usual genre of underground comix. Along with Keep On Truckin' (1968) and the cover art for Cheap Thrills (1968), "A Short History of America" is one of the most reproduced and anthologized of Crumb's works. American artist Chris Ware called it "one of the best comic strips ever drawn".

== Description ==
Crumb presents the original 12 panels beginning with an image of a wilderness. A forest is shown with animals grazing in a nearby meadow; birds fly across the sky. There are no humans. As each panel appears, some length of time passes, and with it, great change. Phases of land development and technological change brought on by the Industrial Revolution are depicted. Throughout the 12 panels, the same, but altered scene appears, with only changes brought on by people. These changes turn the wilderness into an urbanized landscape dotted with buildings, roads, and power supplies, slowly displacing nature as the forests disappear, tree by tree. The last of the 12 panels poses a question as a caption: "What next?!"

Almost a decade after Crumb published the original comic, he added a new epilogue with three additional panels providing possible answers to the question of "what next?" and showing three different futures. The 13th panel, a "Worst Case Scenario: Ecological Disaster", shows the same scene, but this time the cityscape is abandoned and in disuse; it is a scene of ecocide. Contrary to this devastation, a new 14th panel shows the possibility of "The Fun Future, Techno-fix on the March!" It is a space age vision of the future that manages to find technological solutions to the environmental problem with the environment somewhat preserved, but receding into the background as technology dominates the landscape. The final 15th panel depicts what Crumb describes as the "Ecotopian Solution", which has brought humanity into a more harmonious relationship with nature by bringing the environment into the foreground. In the final panel, the forests have reclaimed their previous lost space and people are shown riding bikes near a geodesic dome, with others playing music beneath the trees.

== Critical reception ==
VR pioneer Michael Naimark compares Crumb's work to that of Children's Games (1560) by 16th-century Flemish artist Pieter Bruegel the Elder. Both pieces, Naimark argues, are examples of "place-based works depicting 'accumulated' views", with Crumb using the different panels over time, while Bruegel shows them simultaneously. Daniel Worden of Rochester Institute of Technology sees "A Short History of America" as a parody and continuation of the five-part series The Course of Empire (1833–1836) by American landscape painter Thomas Cole (1801–1848). Like Crumb's work, The Course of Empire shows the same landscape over many different generations, from a natural state to the creation of an empire, and finally its decline. Unlike Cole, however, Crumb's addition of three new panels in 1981 shows that a future might be possible. American artist Chris Ware called it "one of the best comic strips ever drawn".

== Publication history ==
The original comic is in black and white ink, consisting of a total of twelve panels. It was first published by CoEvolution Quarterly in the fall of 1979. It was reprinted that same year in Snoid Comics by Kitchen Sink Press. In 1981, a new version was released by Kitchen Sink Press, with Peter Poplaski adding color to the original work and turning it into a commercial poster for sale. In 1988, Crumb created another version, adding an epilogue consisting of three additional panels.

== Exhibitions ==
A 1993 serigraph of "A Short History of America" was exhibited in 2009 in the show Underground Classics: The Transformation of Comics into Comix at the Chazen Museum of Art in Madison, Wisconsin.

== Bibliography ==
- Brunetti, Ivan (ed.) (2006). An Anthology of Graphic Fiction, Cartoons, and True Stories. Vol. 1. Yale University Press.
- Calonne, David Stephen (2021). R. Crumb: Literature, Autobiography, and the Quest for Self. University Press of Mississippi. ISBN 9781496831897.
- Crumb, Robert (Fall 1979). "A Short History of America". CoEvolution Quarterly. 23: 21–24. ISSN 0095-134X. OCLC 5722271.
- Crumb, Robert (December 6, 1988). "A Short History of America...With Epilogue". Whole Earth Review. pp. 34-35. ISSN 0749-5056.
- Kirk, Andrew (2016). "Alloyed: Countercultural Bricoleurs and the Design Science Revival". In Kaiser, David (ed.); McCray, Patrick (ed.). Groovy Science: Knowledge, Innovation, and American Counterculture. University of Chicago Press. ISBN 9780226372884. OCLC 926105986.
- Leibowitz, Scott G., et al. (1992). A Synoptic Approach to Cumulative Impact Assessment: A Proposed Methodology. Environmental Research Laboratory, U.S. Environmental Protection Agency.
- Lus Arana, Luis Miguel (Winter 2019). "A Short (Architectural) History of the 20th Century. Review, Celebration and Tribute to 40 Years of 'A Short History of America' by Robert Crumb'". ARQ. 103: 64-75.
- Naimark, Michael (2002). "VR Webcams: Time Artifacts as Positive Features". Proceedings of ISEA 2002, the International Symposium of Electronic Art, Nagoya, Japan.
- Schneider, Birgit (2017). "The future face of the Earth: The visual semantics of the future in the climate change imagery of the IPCC". In Matthias Heymann, Gabriele Gramelsberger and Martin Mahony (ed.) Cultures of Prediction in Atmospheric and Climate Science. Routledge Environmental Humanities series. pp. 231-251. ISBN 9781315406282.
- Schreiner, Dave (1994). Kitchen Sink Press The First 25 Years. Kitchen Sink Press. ISBN 087816-3077.
- Worden, Daniel (ed.) (2021). The Comics of R. Crumb: Underground in the Art Museum. University Press of Mississippi. ISBN 9781496833808. OCLC 1244620552.
