= Cuz =

Cuz or CUZ may refer to:

- CUZ (band), an indie rock band featuring Mike Watt of Minutemen and Sam Dook of The Go! Team
- Alejandro Velasco Astete International Airport (IATA code CUZ), in Cusco, Peru
- Catholic University in Zimbabwe (or CUZ), Harare, Zimbabwe
- Communication University of Zhejiang, China

== See also ==
- 1.Cuz, Swedish rapper from Hässelby in Stockholm, born in Somalia
