= The Complete Crumb Comics =

Comic collection series

Complete Crumb Comics
- Cover to Volume 3 of The Complete Crumb Comics.

Publication information
- Publisher: Fantagraphics Books
- Schedule: irregular
- Genre: Underground comix
- Publication date: 1987 – 2005
- No. of issues: 17

Creative team
- Created by: Robert Crumb
- Artist: Robert Crumb
- Editor(s): Gary Groth, Robert Fiore

The Complete Crumb Comics is a series of collections from Fantagraphics Books which was intended to reproduce the entire body of American cartoonist and comic book artist/writer Robert Crumb's comics work in chronological order, beginning with his fanzine work from as early as 1958.

While the series was intended to be complete, there is some material missing (most notably The Yum Yum Book, the copyright of which is owned by Crumb's ex-wife Dana, but which has otherwise been in print as Big Yum Yum Book: The Story of Oggie and the Beanstalk).

Its publication is considered to have brought more serious attention to Crumb's oeuvre, and was one of the earliest attempts to collect a cartoonist's full body of work. The series lasted 17 volumes and was published up until 2005 (covering Crumb's work up to 1992). After this, Crumb's work was to be collected in individually titled collections, and not be part of the official numbered series. (Note: Volume 17 of The Complete Crumb Comics, which will be the final volume in the numbered series of compilations. Subsequent volumes will be individually titled collections of various bodies of work, such as "Hup" and "Mystic Funnies".)

== Volumes ==
All volumes have been published at some point in both softcover and hardcover editions. Two box sets have also been produced, collected Volumes #1–5 and #6–10, with a slip case and signed plate, limited to 400 sets each.

Vol #1 had a revised edition in 2011 to include an additional 66 pages, mostly consisting of the reprint of Arcade #22 (1962). Even with the expansion of this first volume, it failed to additionally include some of the rarest earliest strips, such as Perry Messin, a 4.5 page MAD comics style parody of the Perry Mason TV show, only found in the fanzine EChhhh! #3 (Ken Winter publ., 1959)

Vol #6 also had a revised edition that appeared in 1997, with an additional 12 pages of material, and the removal of one image that involved Robert Williams.

The first two volumes contain material going back as far as Crumb's teenage years, from before he had had his comics professionally published. Some consider this material to be non-essential, and that it would be better for a newcomer to start with later volumes. (Note: "Avoid: The first two volumes of Complete Crumb [which] consist of early work from his teen-age years and early '20s, and thus are for serious fans who want to see how far he's progressed. It's awkward, juvenile material . . . and really not the place for neophytes to start. Wait until you get a feel for his later work and personality before diving into these books." — Mautner, Chris (2009-12-21). "Comics College: Robert Crumb". Comic Book Resources. Archived from the original on 2010-12-27.) (Note: ". . . a good starting point would probably be somewhere in the middle of the Complete Crumb volumes. Why the middle? Well, this is a thorough synopsis of his career, and the first couple of volumes are kind of short on comics, focusing more on his illustration work with Hallmark and some other various things." — Bramer, Kevin (2004-12-28). "Crumb, Robert". Optical Sloth.)

List of Volumes
Vol	Year	Title	Period	ISBN	Notes
1	Oct 1987	The Early Years of Bitter Struggle	1958–1962	ISBN 0-930193-42-3	Introduction by Marty Pahls; Expanded in 2012
2	May 1988	Some More Early Years of Bitter Struggle	1959–1964	ISBN 978-0-930193-62-1	Introduction by Marty Pahls
3	1988	Starring Fritz the Cat	1960–1966	ISBN 0-930193-79-2	1989 Harvey Award for Best Domestic Reprint Project; Introduction by Marty Pahls
4	Dec 1988	Mr. Sixties!	1966–1967	ISBN 978-0-930193-79-9	Reproduces Zap Comix #0 and #1, as well as Crumb's contributions to the underground newspaper Yarrowstalks
5	1990	Happy Hippy Comix	1967–1969	ISBN 0-930193-92-X	Reprints stories from East Village Other (1967–1968), Zap #2–3 (1968), Bijou Funnies #1 (1968), Motor City Comics #1 (1969), and other publications (1968–1969)
6	1990	On the Crest of a Wave	1969–1970	ISBN 1-56097-057-X	Reprints stories from Big Ass #1, Zap #4, Snatch #3, Jiz #1, Despair, and Motor City #2. Also includes 16-page color section (with covers from Gothic Blimp Works); 1991 Harvey Award for Best Domestic Reprint Project; Includes the notoriously X-rated Joe Blow
7	1991	Hot 'n' Heavy	1970–1971	ISBN 978-1-56097-061-3	1992 Harvey Award for Best Domestic Reprint Project
8	1992	Featuring the Death of Fritz the Cat	1971–1972	ISBN 1-56097-076-6	
9	1992	R. Crumb versus the Sisterhood	1972–1973	ISBN 978-1-56097-107-8	Introduction by Crumb; Features work from XYZ Comics Zap #6, Tales from the Leather Nun, and others; as well as collaborations with Harvey Pekar, and illustrations from the 1972 cookbook Eat It, written by Crumb's ex-wife Dana.
10	1994	Crumb Advocates Violent Overthrow	1973–1975	ISBN 1-56097-138-X	1995 Harvey Award for Best Domestic Reprint Project
11	1995	MR. NATURAL COMMITTED TO A MENTAL INSTITUTION!!!	1975–1977	ISBN 978-1-56097-172-6	1996 Eisner Award for Best Archival Collection; 1996 Harvey Award for Best Domestic Reprint Project
12	1996	We're Livin' in the "Lap o' Luxury"!	1976–1979	ISBN 978-1-56097-264-8	
13	1998	The Season of the Snoid	1976–1980	ISBN 978-1-56097-296-9	
14	2001	The Early 1980s and Weirdo Magazine	c. 1981–1983	ISBN 978-1-56097-413-0	earliest Weirdo comics
15	2001	Featuring Mode O'Day and her Pals	1983–1985	ISBN 978-1-56097-413-0	Introduction by Peter Bagge
16	2002	The Mid-1980s: More Years of Valiant Struggle	1985–1987	ISBN 1-56097-460-5	
17	2005	Cave Wimp, Mode O'Day, Aline 'N' Bob, R. Crumb Goes to the Academy Awards	1988–1992	ISBN 1-56097-537-7	

== Awards ==
Year	Organization	Volume	Award
1989	Harvey Awards	3	Best Domestic Reprint Project
1991	Harvey Awards	6	Best Domestic Reprint Project
1992	Harvey Awards	7	Best Domestic Reprint Project
1995	Harvey Awards	10	Best Domestic Reprint Project
1996	Eisner Awards	11	Best Archival Collection
1997	Harvey Awards	12	Best Domestic Reprint Project
