= Snoid =

Underground comix character created by Robert Crumb

The Snoid
- The cover of Snoid Comics (Kitchen Sink Press, 1979), artwork by Robert Crumb

Publication information
- Publisher: Apex Novelties, The Print Mint, Rip Off Press, Kitchen Sink Press, San Francisco Comic Book Company, Fantagraphics
- First appearance: Yarrowstalks #2 (July 1967)
- First comic appearance: Snatch Comics #2 (Apex Novelties, Jan. 1969)
- Created by: Robert Crumb

In-story information
- Alter ego: Mr. Snoid
- Species: Human?
- Place of origin: Earth
- Partnerships: Angelfood McSpade, Mr. Natural, R. Crumb
- Abilities: Ability to squeeze into extremely tight spaces

The Snoid, occasionally referred to as Mr. Snoid, is an American underground comix character created by Robert Crumb in the mid-1960s. A diminutive sex fiend and irritating presence, the Snoid often appears with other Crumb characters, particularly Angelfood McSpade, Mr. Natural, and Crumb's own self-caricature.

== Publication history ==
Crumb created the Snoid in his sketchbook in the winter of 1965/1966; the character first appeared in print in the Philadelphia underground newspaper Yarrowstalks #2 (July 1967). After more strips published in underground papers the East Village Other and the Chicago Seed, the Snoid's first true comics appearance was in Snatch Comics #2 (Apex Novelties, Jan. 1969), and from 1969 until 1973 he appeared in many Crumb comics, including Zap Comix, Motor City Comics, Home Grown Funnies, Your Hytone Comics, Big Ass Comics, Mr. Natural, and Black and White Comics.

The character was satirized by cartoonist Daniel Clyne as "Doctor Frigmund Snoid" in Bijou Funnies #4 (The Print Mint, 1970), in the story "Dr. Lum Bago" (where he appeared alongside the "shared" underground character Projunior).

The character finally appeared in his own one-shot title in Snoid Comics (Kitchen Sink Press, [Dec.] 1979), which featured six new stories; it was also his last major appearance. (Snoid Comics #1 also reprinted the celebrated Crumb strip, "A Short History of America" — which does not feature the Snoid.)

Many of the Snoid's adventures were collected in April 1998 in The Complete Crumb Comics #13 - "The Season of the Snoid", published by Fantagraphics. His stories have been translated into German, French, Dutch, and Swedish.

== Characterization ==
According to an early strip, the Snoid is from Sheboygan, Wisconsin. Other stories portray multiple Snoids in existence. In one story, a "certain mountain" in Tibet is filled with numerous Snoids who sexually assault "Horny Harriet Hotpants"; she later ends up marrying Jesus. Another story portrays Mr. Snoid happily living inside a woman's rectum, but ends with a plea to help the other Snoids "walking the streets, cold and lonely".

In a story that appeared in Mr. Natural #2, Mr. Snoid has inspired a cult called The Snoidians, who cart him around on the shoulders of the "Giant Daughter of the Snoidvoid". The Snoidians battle with the "Mr. Naturalists", destroying the Snoid's conveyance and forcing him and Mr. Natural to escape the violence together.

Underground comix writer M. Steven Fox wrote about the Snoid:

The ... character is, bottom line, a short-statured asshole, and many people believe that Snoid, with his fetishes, sex cravings and disdain for materialism, is little more than an alter ego for Crumb. One of those people is Crumb's own brother Maxon, who wrote about the Snoid's purpose in The Complete Crumb #13, "It was like with Carl Barks and his character Scrooge McDuck: Robert and the Snoid. With Barks it was money, with Robert it was sex".

== List of appearances (selected) ==
- "Hey Boparee Bop", Yarrowstalks #2 (July 1967) — with Gar, Jesus Christ (unnamed), Mr. Natural, and Angelfood McSpade
- "The Old Pooperoo Pauses to Ponder / I Wanna Go Home! / You're Gonna Get There Anyway!", in East Village Other vol. 3, #2 (December 1–15, 1967) — with The Old Pooperoo, Flakey Foont, Mr. Natural, Goofy, Speed Freak, and Angelfood McSpade
- "All Asshole Comics", Chicago Seed (Seed Publishing, July 1968) vol. 3 #1 — with Angelfood McSpade
- "Zap Comics Tells It Like It Is!!" (promo (ad from the publisher), Zap Comix #2 (Apex Novelties, [July] 1968) — with Biceps Bunny
- "Everyday Funnies with 'The Snoid from Sheboygan'", East Village Other vol. 3, #43 (Oct. 4, 1968)
- untitled ["Can the Mind Know it?"], East Village Other vol. 3, #47 (Oct. 25, 1968) — with Mr. Natural
- "Look Out Girls!! The Grabbies are Coming!!", Snatch Comics #2 (Apex Novelties, Jan. 1969)
- Zap Comix #0 (The Print Mint, [Feb.] 1969)
  - "Freak Out Funnies" — co-starring Spacemen
  - untitled ["I'm getting tired of running around this ol' city!"] — with Angelfood McSpade
- untitled ["Mmm... very tasty indeed I must say!!"], Jiz Comics (Apex Novelties, 1969)
- "Night of Terror", Motor City Comics #2 (Rip Off Press, February 1970) — with Shuman the Human
- "Backwater Blues", Home Grown Funnies #1 (Kitchen Sink Press, Jan. 1971) — with Angelfood McDevilsfood
- Your Hytone Comics (Apex Novelties, Feb. 1971)
  - "Horny Harriet Hotpants" — with Horny Harriet Hotpants, Orra Lee, Recta Lee, and Jesus
  - "Pete the Plumber" — intro only (features Pete the Plumber and Plungo)
- Big Ass Comics #2 (Rip Off Press, Aug. 1971)
  - "Anal Antics" — with the Landlady
  - "And Now, A Word to You Feminist Women" — cameo alongside Robert Crumb
- untitled ["I am the greatest! Make way! Make Way!"], Mr. Natural #2 (San Francisco Comic Book Company, [Oct.] 1971) — with Mr. Natural
- "The Nightmare", Promethean Enterprises #4 (Bud Plant / Al Davoren, 1971)
- Black and White Comics (Apex Novelties, [June] 1973)
  - untitled ["Attention all personnel!!"] — with Will Shade, Ishman Bracey, Crazy Ed, Erton Snoody, and Bill the Pill
  - "Big Fine Legs"
- "Once I Led the Life of a Millionaire", Carload o' Comics (Bélier Press, Dec. 1976) — with Mr. Natural
- Snoid Comics (Kitchen Sink Press, [Dec.] 1979)
  - "Mr. Snoid: Meet the Snoid"
  - "This Cartooning is Tricky Business!" — with Robert Crumb
  - "The Snoid Goes Bohemian" — with Beverly Baumstein
  - "How Snoids are Born"
  - "One Foot to Heaven" — with Sweet
  - "Mr. Snoid Among His Fellow Humans"
