= Up in Flames =

Up in Flames may refer to:

- Up in Flames (album), a 2003 album by Dan Snaith, released under the moniker Manitoba
- Up in Flames (film), a 1973 pornographic film
- "Up in Flames", a 2011 song by Coldplay from the album Mylo Xyloto
- "Up in Flames", a 2004 song by Joe Satriani from his album Is There Love in Space?
- "Up In Flames" a 2019 song by Years & Years from the album Palo Santo
