= Angelfood McSpade =

- Angelfood McSpade, from Zap Comix #2 (July 1968), illustrated by Robert Crumb

Publication information
- Publisher: Apex Novelties, Print Mint, Kitchen Sink Press
- First appearance: Yarrowstalks #2 (July 1967)
- First comic appearance: Zap Comix #2 (July 1968)
- Created by: Robert Crumb

In-story information
- Alter ego: Angel McFood, Angelfood McDevilsfood
- Species: Human
- Place of origin: Earth
- Partnerships: Snoid, Mr. Natural

Angelfood McSpade is a comic book character created and drawn by the 1960s counter culture figure and underground comix artist Robert Crumb. The character first appeared in the Philadelphia-based underground newspaper Yarrowstalks #2 in July 1967, making her comics debut in the second issue of Zap Comix (June 1968).

== Characterization ==
Angelfood McSpade is a satirical portrayal of a stereotypical black woman. She is depicted as a large, bare-breasted tribeswoman, dressed in nothing but a skirt made out of palm tree leaves. She is drawn with big lips, golden rings around her neck and in her ears, huge breasts, large round buttocks and speaks jive. Her name references angelfood cake and the racial slur "spade".

According to the second issue of Zap Comix, she has been confined to "the wilds of darkest Africa", because "civilization would be threatened if she were allowed to do whatever she pleased!" It is not clear whether she was born in Africa or born in the United States and then sent to Africa. Her type of clothing suggests she is African, but her jive talk suggests she is from the United States.

Angelfood is depicted as a nymphomaniac and open to sexual intercourse. In many of her stories, she is accompanied by Snoid, another of Crumb's characters who is portrayed as "a short-statured asshole" known for "his fetishes, sex cravings, and disdain for materialism". Policemen prevent other sexually aroused men from meeting Angelfood. In a later story, three men bring her to the United States and promise to "civilize" her. There, she is told to lick toilets clean in order to gain success. While she does this, the men push her head inside the toilet and violate her.

She is very naïve and easily abused or even raped by the horny men who surround her, though, being a nymphomaniac, she is not bothered by this. Often, she is vulnerable to assault while being asleep or unconscious. Angelfood has a tendency to walk bare-breasted, even in cities. However, no one seems to stop her from walking around half-naked. In another story, she saves two boys, Chuck and Bob, (Note: Chuck and Bob, of course, being nicknames for the Crumb brothers Charles and Robert.) from being eaten by members of her own tribe. They flee from the tribe to the U.S., where she spends a night with the boys and afterward goes to the hairdresser. When she returns, she has bleached her skin, changed her hair and clothing, and learned fluent English, much to the disappointment of the two boys. In another story, published in Playboy magazine, she asks Hugh Hefner if she can become a Playboy Bunny, but when Hefner sees her in the outfit, he can not resist laughing. This makes her so angry that she attacks him. In the last panel, she and Mr. Natural (who accompanied her) are kicked out of Hefner's office.

The character was featured regularly during Crumb's late 1960s and early 1970s output. In later comics her appearances became less frequent, and finally after 1971 Crumb stopped using the character in his comics altogether.

== Controversy ==
Angelfood McSpade is one of Crumb's most notorious targets for accusations of sexism and racism. Crumb has responded that he did not invent racist caricatures like Angelfood, but that they used to be part of the American culture in which he was raised. He saw the character as a criticism of the racist stereotype itself and assumed that the young liberal hippie/intellectual audience who read his work were not racists and would understand his intentions for the character.

== List of appearances (selected) ==
- "Hey Boparee Bop", Yarrowstalks #2 (July 1967) — with Mr. Natural and the Snoid
- "The Old Pooperoo Pauses to Ponder", East Village Other vol. 3, #2 (1–15 December 1967) — with Mr. Natural and Flakey Foont
- "Angelfood McSpade: She's Sock-a-Delic — She's All Heart", Zap Comix #2 (July 1968)
- "All Asshole Comics", Chicago Seed vol. 3, #1 (Seed Publishing, July 1968) — with Snoid
- Untitled ("There she is, fellows! Ah! She'll be so grateful to us!"), East Village Other (18 October 1968)
- "Hey Boparee Bop", R. Crumb's Head Comix (Viking Press, November 1968) — with Mr. Natural and Snoid
- "Freak Out Funnies" (or "I'm getting tired of running around this ol' city!"), Zap Comix #0 (Apex Novelties, 1968) — with Snoid
- "Ups and Downs", Yellow Dog vol. 2, #2 [issue #13/14] (Print Mint, July 1969) — with Chuck and Bob
- "Angelfood McSpade", Playboy vol. 17, #7 (July 1970) — with Mr. Natural and Hugh Hefner
- "Angelfood McDevilsfood in Backwater Blues", Home Grown Funnies #1 (Kitchen Sink Press, January 1971) — with Snoid

== See also ==
- African characters in comics
- Stereotypes of African Americans
