= Mr. Natural (character) =

Comics character created by Robert Crumb

Publication information
- Publisher: Apex Novelties, Print Mint, San Francisco Comic Book Company, Last Gasp, Kitchen Sink Press
- First appearance: Yarrowstalks #1 (May 5, 1967)
- First comic appearance: Zap Comix #1 (Feb. 1968)
- Created by: Robert Crumb

In-story information
- Full name: Fred Natural
- Place of origin: Earth
- Partnerships: Flakey Foont, Shuman the Human, Devil Girl
- Abilities: magical powers, cosmic insight

Mr. Natural (Fred Natural) is a comic book character created and drawn by 1960s counterculture and underground comix artist Robert Crumb. First appearing in Yarrowstalks (1967), the character gained a following during the emergence of underground comix in the 1960s and 1970s, and has been extensively merchandised in various products.

== Publication history ==
When he settled in San Francisco in 1967, Crumb began drawing LSD-inspired comics. The first Mr. Natural strip, "Mr. Natural: The Zen Master", appeared in the premiere issue of the Philadelphia-based underground newspaper Yarrowstalks on 5 May 1967. When editor Brian Zahn proposed to Crumb to fill the entire third issue with his comix, Crumb created Flakey Foont and several other characters.

Mr. Natural made appearances in other underground newspapers such as the East Village Other, which published the strips "Mr. Natural Meets God" and "Mr. Natural Repents" among others. He made his first official comix appearance in Zap Comix #1 (Feb. 1968). Mr. Natural also appeared in early underground comix titles like Bijou Funnies, and Yellow Dog. He was a regular in Zap for the balance of the 1960s until appearing in his own three-issue title, originally co-published by the San Francisco Comic Book Company and Apex Novelties.

Crumb created original Mr. Natural strips for The Village Voice from February 2-November 29, 1976, which were first collected in Mr. Natural #3 (Kitchen Sink Press, 1977).

After a ten-year hiatus, Mr. Natural returned in the pages of Crumb's solo series, Hup (Last Gasp), and then after another gap, in Mystic Funnies #1 (Alex Wood, 1997). The character hasn't made a new appearance since 2002.

Mr. Natural's various appearances were collected in The Complete Crumb Comics vol. 4, "Mr. Sixties!" (Fantagraphics, 1989), The Book of Mr. Natural (Fantagraphics, 1995), as well as The Complete Crumb Comics vol. 11, "Mr. Natural Committed to a Mental Institution!" (Fantagraphics, 1995).

== Characterization ==
At first appearance, Mr. Natural is a mystic guru who spouts aphorisms on the evils of the modern world and the salvation to be found in mysticism and natural living. He has renounced the material world and lives off anything he can get in exchange for his nuggets of wisdom. Usually depicted as slightly overweight (although his size varies), he is bald with a long white beard, and wears a gown which makes him resemble "old man" depictions of God or a prophet.

Crumb's bearded guru is too unapologetic to be called a con man. Despite his renunciation of the material world, he is an unrepentant sybarite. His straight talk, while refreshing, can get him into trouble, as when he was kicked out of Heaven for telling God it is "a little corny" in "Mr. Natural Meets God". But he may be the only Crumb creation who is genuinely likable. Mr. Natural's advice is seemingly at odds with his image as a sage, and his inventions are at once brilliant and crackpot. Perhaps Mr. Natural's most famous aphorism is, "Mr. Natural sez, Use the right tool for the job" — spoken on seeing Flakey Foont unloading a truck full of bowling balls with a pitchfork. Asked, "What does it all mean?", he responds, "Don't mean sheeit..."

Mr. Natural has strange, magical powers and possesses cosmic insight, but he is also moody, cynical, self-pitying, and suffers from various strange sexual obsessions. He is endlessly being accosted by would-be disciples seeking the truth (among them such long-running Crumb characters as Flakey Foont and Shuman the Human). He typically regards them with amused condescension and a certain grudging affection, although his patience often wears thin and he takes sadistic pleasure in making them feel like idiots. While he is typically very cool and in control, he sometimes ends up in humiliating predicaments like languishing for years in a mental institution.

According to a biography written and illustrated by Crumb, "Fred Natural" had been a jazz musician and then faith healer in the 1920s, which would mean that he was "born" in the early years of the 20th century, and by the time of his first encounters (set in the San Francisco area) in the 1960s, was a 60-year-old man. However, in Crumb's illustration of the 1920s faith healer, Fred Natural looks approximately fifty, which would make him one hundred years old in the earliest Flakey Foont encounters. Mr. Natural's own father is featured in a 1973 Zap story, where he is represented as a rugged frontier type living in a rundown tenement-style apartment building.

In the "biography", "Fred Natural" leaves America and travels for many years in Asia, which is where he picks up his unique combination of wisdom and chicanery. For a time he worked as a taxicab driver in Afghanistan. He returns to the U.S during the Beat era of the 1960s, and is drawn to the San Francisco Bay area by nubile girls and people willing to listen and pay for his improvisational spirituality. He exhorts his disciples to eat only his own line of "Mr. Natural Brand Foods", and to listen to his broadcasts on the fictional WZAP Radio.

A theme in Mr. Natural is the inability of generations in the United States to connect, with each generation rejecting the one before it. Mr. Natural is a "grandfather", and not a "father", to the clueless Foont. In one strip, Mr. Natural's father finds Foont so decadent that he attacks him.

In the 1980s and 1990s he entered into a tempestuous relationship with Devil Girl, another popular Crumb character.

== Inspiration ==
Barry Miles writes that Mr. Natural is a lampoon of Maharishi Mahesh Yogi. In the film Comic Book Confidential, Crumb says that he was inspired to draw the character when he heard then radio DJ David Rubenstein jokingly calling himself "Mr. Natural".

A conscious model for Mr. Natural would be various louche and disreputable Great Depression survivors who'd gone through the Second World War in various capacities such as war correspondent, and who'd volunteered for service in the Spanish Civil War, only to discover, in the McCarthy era of the 1950s, that their background made them unemployable and who developed various sorts of scams to prey upon the postwar Baby Boomers' search for enlightenment.

Crumb has acknowledged that one inspiration for Mr. Natural was a character called The Little Hitchhiker from a comic strip called The Squirrel Cage by Gene Ahern, which ran from 1936 to 1953. An homage is sometimes read into this. Mr. Natural also somewhat resembles an E. C. Segar character, Dr. O.G. Wotasnozzle. Mr. Natural's one-piece yellow outfit bears a resemblance to Richard F. Outcault's early comic strip The Yellow Kid.

== In popular culture ==
In 1978, a pornographic film called Up in Flames was made, featuring Mr. Natural and Gilbert Shelton's Fabulous Furry Freak Brothers. The film was made without the knowledge or permission of Crumb or Shelton.

Mr. Natural appeared, unauthorized, stamped on the blotter paper of a popular form of LSD in the 1970s.

A Martin Rowson cartoon in the July 24, 2008, edition of The Guardian featured the recently arrested Radovan Karadžić in the guise of Mr. Natural.

Mr. Natural makes a cameo in Disney film Chip 'n Dale: Rescue Rangers, as one of the toons operating on Main Street's hidden black market. His only line, "Far out!", is voiced by the film's director Akiva Schaffer.

== List of appearances (selected) ==
=== Solo titles ===
- Mr. Natural #1 (San Francisco Comic Book Company/Apex Novelties, Aug. 1970) — "Mr. Natural's 719th Meditation", "Om Sweet Om" (with Shuman the Human), "The Origins of Mr. Natural", "The Mr. Natural Drawing Contest", "On the Bum Again"
- Mr. Natural #2 (San Francisco Comic Book Company, Oct. 1971) — "A Gurl in Hotpants" (with Flakey Foont), "Sittin' Around the Kitchen Table" (with Flakey Foont), "The Girlfriend" (with Flakey Foont), "Have you seen 'um lately?", "I am the greatest! Make way! Make Way!" (with the Snoid), "On the Bum Again, part two"
- Mr. Natural #3 (Kitchen Sink Press, 1977) — essentially 43 one-page stories (originally published in the Village Voice)
- Mystic Funnies #1 (Alex Wood, 1997) — (all stories co-star Flakey Foont) "Who Are You?", "Look and See!", "Ah Yes, So It Goes", "Big Man", "Omen in the Gloamin'", "The Saints"

=== Other appearances ===
- Yarrowstalks #1 (David Auten and Brian Zahn, May 5, 1967)
- "Hey Boparee Bop", Yarrowstalks #2 (July 1967) — with the Snoid, Gar, Jesus Christ (unnamed), and Angelfood McSpade
- "Mr. Natural Encounters Flakey Foont", Yarrowstalks #3 (Aug. 1967) — with Flakey Foont
- "The Old Pooperoo Pauses to Ponder", East Village Other vol. 3, #2 (December 1–15, 1967) — with Flakey Foont, the Snoid, and Angelfood McSpade
- "Mr. Natural 'Visits The City'", Zap Comix #1 (Apex Novelties, Feb. 1968) — with Flakey Foont
- "Mr. Natural's School of Wisdom", Yellow Dog #1 (Print Mint, May 1968)
- "Hm!! Some of these students of mine haven't been making their monthly payments of late!", Zap Comix #2 (Apex Novelties, July 1968)
- untitled ["Can the Mind Know it?"], East Village Other vol. 3, #47 (Oct. 25, 1968) — with the Snoid
- "Mr. Natural in Death Valley", Zap Comix #0 (Apex Novelties, late 1968) — with Flakey Foont
- "Street Corner Daze", Zap Comix #3 (Apex Novelties, Fall 1968)
- "Hey Boparee Bop", R. Crumb's Head Comix (Viking Press, Nov. 1968) — with Angelfood McSpade
- Yellow Dog #8 (1969)
  - ""Mr. Natural! Mr. Natural! I want you to come and look at my sore bunion" — with Flakey Foont
  - "Mr. Natural Falls in Love"
- "Mr. Natural Takes a Vacation", Zap Comix #4 (Print Mint, 1969) — with Flakey Foont
- "@**!!!! I gotta remember to cancel my subscription to that rag..." (later retitled "Let Mr. Natural do your thinking for you!!"), Zap Comix #5 (Print Mint, 1970) — with Flakey Foont
- "Smogville Blues", Slow Death Funnies #1 (Last Gasp, Apr. 1970) — with Flakey Foont
- "Mr. Natural —The Zen Master", Bijou Funnies #4 (Print Mint, May 1970)
- "Angelfood McSpade", Playboy vol. 17, #7 (July 1970) — with Angelfood McSpade and Hugh Hefner
- Uneeda Comix (Print Mint, Aug. 1970)
  - "Mr. Natural Goes to a Meeting of the Minds" — with Flakey Foont and Shuman the Human
  - "It's a Workaday World" — with Flakey Foont
- "Mr. Natural Stops Talking", Your Hytone Comics (Apex Novelties, Feb. 1971)
- "I'm taking you to see my ol' man...", Zap Comix #6 (Print Mint, 1973) — with Flakey Foont
- "Mr. Natural Meets 'The Kid'", Zap Comix #7 (Print Mint, 1974)
- "Once I Led the Life of a Millionaire", Carload o' Comics (Bélier Press, Dec. 1976) — with the Snoid
- Hup #1 (Last Gasp, 1987)
  - "Uh Oh! He's Back! Who's Back? You'll Find Out!" — with Flakey Foont
  - "Here He Comes Again!" — with Flakey Foont and Devil Girl
- "The Meeting", Hup #2 (July 1987) — with Flakey Foont and Devil Girl
- "He's A Natural Man!", Hup #3 (Last Gasp, Nov. 1989) — with Flakey Foont and Devil Girl
- Hup #4 (Last Gasp, 1992)
  - "Distractions, Distractions!!" — with Flakey Foont and Devil Girl
  - "A Bitchin' Bod!" — with Flakey Foont
- "Mr. Natural Wants to Talk to You!" Mystic Funnies #2 (Last Gasp, Apr. 1999)
- "Don't Fuck With Him", Mystic Funnies #3 (Fantagraphics, Mar. 2002)
