= Trashman (character) =

Fictional character

- Cover from The Collected Trashman Vol. 1, No. 1 ("Fat City and Red Mountain Tribe", 1969) by Spain Rodriguez.

Publication information
- Publisher: East Village Other; Rip Off Press
- First appearance: East Village Other (July 1968)
- Created by: Spain Rodriguez

In-story information
- Alter ego: Harry Barnes
- Team affiliations: Sixth International
- Abilities: Superhuman strength, stamina, speed, agility, reflexes, equilibrium and durability; "Shape shifting", ability to rearrange his molecular structure; "Random Alert Factor", a precognitive sense which can derive warning information from random observations.

Trashman is a superhero who appeared regularly in underground comix and magazines between 1968 and 1985. He was created and drawn by Spain Rodriguez.

== Publication history ==
Trashman's first appearance was as a full-page serial comic strip in the New York City underground newspaper the East Village Other. After moving from New York City to San Francisco in 1970, Spain's Subvert Comics series (1970–1976) featured "three full length Trashman: Agent of the Sixth International stories".

Since 1976, Trashman has appeared in such publications as High Times, Heavy Metal, Weirdo, San Francisco magazine, Zap Comix #11-13, and the Fantagraphics anthology Zero Zero #2.

== Fictional character biography ==
Trashman is a hero of the working classes and a champion of the radical left causes. The Trashman stories are set in a dystopian near-future America, which after having been ravaged by nuclear weapon attacks, has become a fascist police state, with "vast urban conglomerations. Social ferment [has] divided the land into a patchwork of virtually self-governing areas".

Mild-mannered auto mechanic Harry Barnes turned to a life of petty crime after finding his wife murdered in their home by Gestapo-like soldiers. As Barnes flees capture by the police, a mysterious stranger in a hooded robe calling himself "Citizen X" appears and leads him down a hidden passageway to a secret underground installation. There, Barnes is told he was chosen by the mysterious and elusive "Sixth International", an underground anarcho-Marxist organization, to be trained as a master of the "para-sciences" and to use these powers to fight the oppression of the fascist governments of the world.

Trashman is typically cast as the defender of the working-class masses against the tyranny of fascist police/military forces, agents of governmental oppression, and the plots of the rich and powerful to oppress the common people. He is depicted as a strong, rugged, black-clad militant figure, with dark hair and beard and eyes always in shadow, who wields conventional military weapons such as machine guns, pistols, daggers and explosives in addition to his superpowers.

== Superpowers ==
"Harry Barnes, known to the world as Trashman, trained by the elusive Sixth International as a master of the para-sciences, is able to change his molecular structure or decipher a crack in the sidewalk". (quote from Trashman's first comic strip in the East Village Other)

Trashman's powers include superhuman strength, stamina, speed, agility, reflexes, equilibrium and durability. He is not invulnerable to harm, but his powers usually enable him to avoid being wounded or killed by conventional weapons. He also has the ability to "shape-shift" or alter his shape and molecular structure to any desired form, including non-organic ones. For example, he once shifted himself into the shape of a copy of the East Village Other. He retains his mental abilities even while shifted and can change back to human form at will.

Trashman also has a power called the "Random Alert Factor", based on the fictional "science of numantics". One of the principles of numantics, according to Trashman's Professor of Numantics Dr. Eugene Kranker, is that "from observing random phenomena, a general pattern may be deduced". Trashman is tuned into this mode of perception, giving him a synchronicity-based precognition/clairvoyance, of seemingly unrelated information by making observations of random (complex) phenomena. For example, on the inside back cover artwork of Subvert Comics #1, Trashman "hears" a crack in the sidewalk "speak" to him, warning him of an attack from behind. Strangely, Trashman's powers are diminished when he is exposed to an atmosphere lacking in a certain level of pollution.

== Cultural influence ==
The Trashman series is one of the very few superhero stories depicted in the underground comix of the 1960s and 1970s, particularly as a recurring character. Trashman's post-apocalyptic setting and Marxist-anarchist overtones expressed Spain's own social and political beliefs, as well as the sensibilities of the anti-Vietnam War movement and the underground counterculture of the era. Like many underground comix, the Trashman stories are replete with graphic depictions of violence, sex and profanity, which were all but unknown in superhero comics of the past.

There are also many times that the characters break the "fourth wall" boundary between the fiction and the reader, typical of post-modern art. In one exchange with another character, Trashman "admits" he is a comic book character: "You heard Dr. Kranker. It was all figured out thru numantics. It's just odds and fixed points and all that stuff". Do you expect me to believe that?" "Shhh! Don't blow it man. There's all those readers out there watching".

The style and setting of the Trashman comics are similar to many of the post-apocalyptic graphic novels and films that followed it years later, such as the Blade Runner and Mad Max films, the Dark Knight series of Batman graphic novels, and the V for Vendetta graphic novel and film. In an interview with John Ascher, Spain claimed no direct influence on these later works, but concedes: "These ideas are out there. The artist pursues a cultural thread, and there are other people pursuing that cultural thread as well, so you exchange these ideas, they’re thrown back and forth, amplified, then the cultural thread goes underground, then it pops up again, often".
