= Yarrowstalks =

Underground newspaper from the 1960s-1970s

- The cover of Yarrowstalks #3 (August 1967), cover art by Robert Crumb.
- Editor: Brian Zahn
- Categories: Underground press
- Frequency: Irregular
- Format: tabloid newspaper (issues 1-7) magazine (issues 8–12)
- Circulation: 10,000 (1967)
- Publisher: Brian Zahn
- Founder: David Auten and Brian Zahn
- Founded: 1967
- First issue: May 5, 1967; 59 years ago
- Final issue Number: May 1975; 51 years ago 12
- Country: United States (1967, 1968, 1973–1975); United Kingdom (1967); Denmark (1970)
- Based in: Philadelphia (1967, 1968, 1973–1975); London (1967); Copenhagen (1970)
- Language: English

Yarrowstalks was an underground newspaper (and later a magazine), primarily based in Philadelphia, Pennsylvania, that published 12 issues from 1967 to 1975. It is notable for being the first publication to publish the comix of underground cartoonist Robert Crumb. In addition to Crumb, other notable contributors to Yarrowstalks included Timothy Leary and the editor/publisher Brian Zahn.

Unlike many underground papers of its era, Yarrowstalks was not explicitly political. Like the San Francisco Oracle, Yarrowstalks combined poetry, spirituality, and multicultural interests with psychedelic design, reflecting and shaping the countercultural community as it developed in Philadelphia. Yarrowstalks was noted for its innovative use of color, graphic design, and cold type offset printing. The name of the publication is derived from Achillea millefolium ["yarrow"]; the stalks are dried and used as a randomizing agent in I Ching divination.

== Publication history ==
Yarrowstalks was the brainchild of Brian Zahn. The first issue, released on May 5, 1967, was co-published with David Auten; as was issue #2.

Crumb's work came to the attention of Zahn (via the Underground Press Syndicate) from the cartoonist's upbeat LSD-inspired illustrations for other underground newspapers. Crumb's origins were in Philadelphia, and he agreed to publish his first comix work in Yarrowstalks, culminating in all-comix, all-Crumb issue in Yarrowstalks #3.

Yarrowstalks released five issues, essentially monthly, during 1967. By the fourth issue, in late 1967, Zahn had relocated to London. Yarrowstalks #5 was co-published out of London by Zahn, David Vaughan, Paul Noble, and Chris Hill. From London, Zahn put the publication on hiatus as he traveled in India, presumably — like many others of the era — seeking spiritual enlightenment.

The success of Yarrowstalks #3 indirectly led Crumb to publish the groundbreaking underground title Zap Comix: Zahn intended to publish Zap #1 but left the country with Crumb's artwork. Rather than repeat himself, Crumb drew a new assortment of strips (published in February 1968 by Don Donahue) which replaced the missing issue. In late 1968, shortly before Zap #3 was to be published, Crumb found Xerox copies of the missing pages from the original Zap #1, which successfully captured the line-work but not the solid blacks. After being re-inked by Crumb, those strips subsequently appeared as Zap #0. Despite this SNAFU, Crumb remained a Yarrowstalks contributor throughout the bulk of the publication's existence.

Yarrowstalks #6 appeared in December 1968, a full year after the fifth issue (with Zahn having returned to Philadelphia), but due to printing problems, only 50 or so "bad issues" were published. Issue #7 wasn't published until 1970, out of Copenhagen.

With issue #8 (again following a two-year hiatus), the publication converted to a magazine format, with the publisher returning to Philadelphia for good this time. Issue #9 was published in June 1973, and #10 appeared a year later. The two final issues of Yarrowstalks appeared in 1975, coming to a close in May of that year.

A thirteenth issue of Yarrowstalks was planned but never published. The publication's circulation reached a high of 10,000; its largest paid subscription at any time was 300.

All of Crumb's comics contributions to Yarrowstalks were eventually collected in The Complete Crumb Comics #4: Mr. Sixties!.

== Issues ==
#	Date	Publishing location	Copies printed	Robert Crumb contributions	Notes
1	May 5, 1967	Philadelphia	10,000	"Stoned" illustration, caricature of hippie couple, "The Trip, Starring Novice Kosher" (20-panel strip), "Mr. Natural, the Zen Master" (6-panel strip); first published appearance of Mr. Natural	Co-edited by Zahn and Auten
2	July 1967	Philadelphia	4,000	"Head Comix" (full-page, 36-panel strip); first published appearance of Angelfood McSpade and the Snoid	Co-edited by Zahn and Auten
3	Aug. 1967	Philadelphia	5,000	All-comix issue featuring Crumb, including the cover: "Head Comix", "Eggs Ackley that Number One Son of a Gun!", "Mr. Natural Encounters Flakey Foont", "Itzy and Bitzy in 'Cause and Effect'", "Big Freakout on Detroit Ave.", "Life Among the Constipated", and two Mr. Natural strips	8 pp., cover price 25 cents
4	Nov. 1967	London	10,000	—	
5	Dec. 1967	London	10,000	—	Co-published by Zahn, David Vaughan, Paul Noble, and Chris Hill
6	Dec. 1968	Philadelphia	50	Cover has six-panel Crumb drawing at the bottom; "City of the Future" (3-page strip)	
7	Dec. 1970	Copenhagen	1,000	—	
8	Dec. 1972/Jan. 1973	Philadelphia	1,000	"Mr. Natural, the Zen Master" (full-page, 6-panel strip), two full-page portrait drawings	Converts to magazine format
9	June 1973	Philadelphia	1,000	Full-page illustration	
10	June 1974	Philadelphia	1,000	Two full-page illustrations, one of them titled "Ow! That’s the Bazoozis!"	
11	Feb./Mar. 1975	Philadelphia	1,000	Reproduction of the cover of issue #3	Inside lower cover features advertisement offering free copies of issue #3 (the all-Crumb issue) to new subscribers.
12	May 1975	Philadelphia	4,500	—	Edited by Jacquelyn deB. Deichler

== See also ==
- List of underground newspapers of the 1960s counterculture
