= CUZ (band) =

American indie rock band

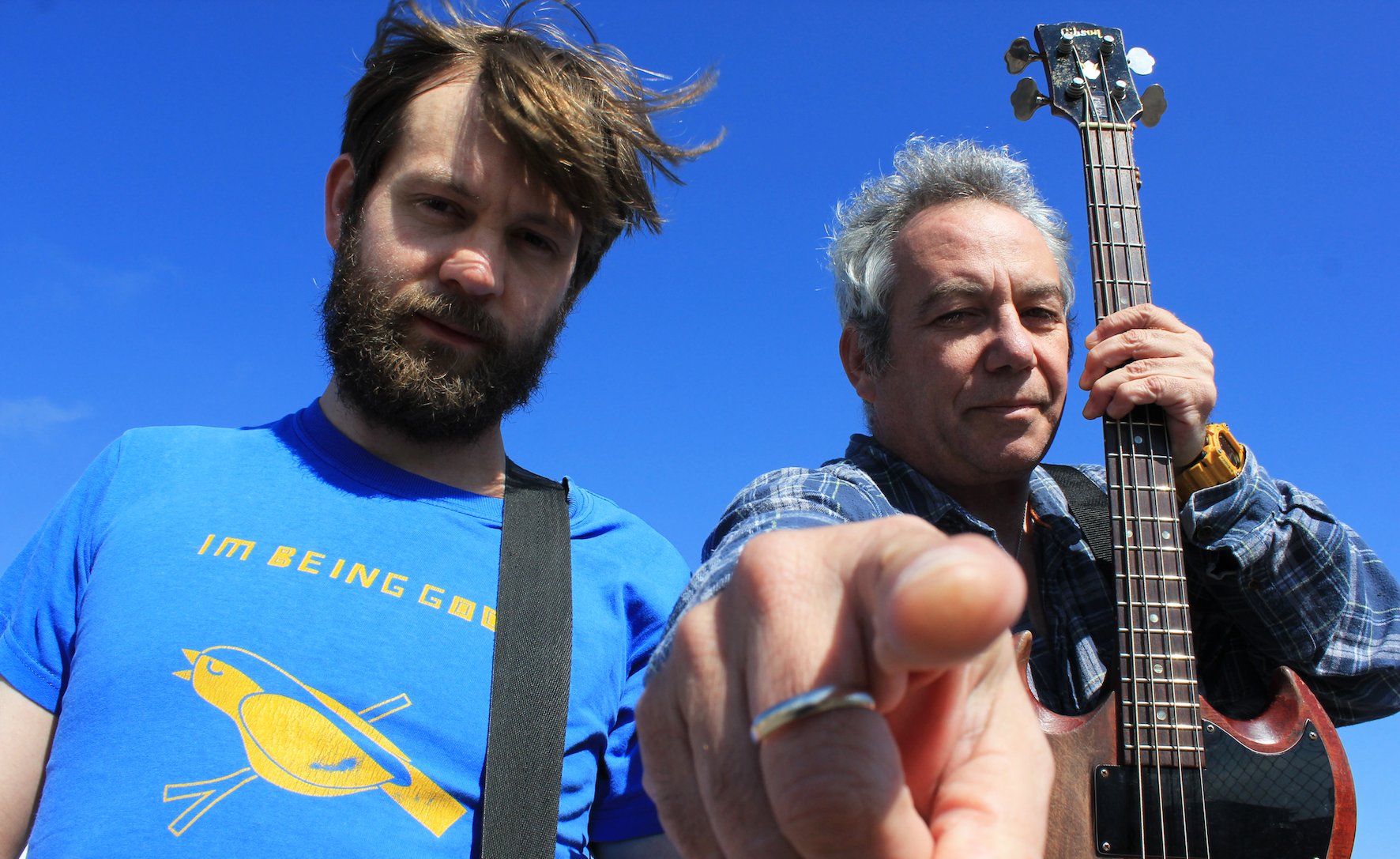
- Sam Dook and Mike Watt

Background information
- Origin: Brighton, England
- Genre: Indie rock
- Years active: 2008–present
- Label: Bleeding heart recordings
- Members: Sam Dook; Mike Watt

CUZ is an indie rock band formed in 2008 featuring Sam Dook of The Go! Team and Mike Watt of Minutemen and fIREHOSE. Their debut album Tamatebako was released on May 14, 2014.

== History ==
In 2006, Watt met Sam Dook of The Go! Team at Big Day Out. Watt was intrigued by The Go! Team's use of samples.

I was kind of naïve or something, I wasn’t familiar with that technology, right? I actually didn’t know, I thought they were playing all that stuff. To me, tape recorders—you play music and the tape recorder captures it. But this whole idea of samples…it’s a pretty creative tool and, you know, I wanted to explore it.

Dook and Watt began corresponding via email and decided to form a band. Watt visited Dook in Brighton while The Stooges were in London and they jammed for three days. Watt suggested Dook use pieces of those sessions as samples to create new songs. When Watt returned home to San Pedro he sent more bass tracks to Dook. Eventually, they finished the album over email and named their project "CUZ" based on a zine Richard Hell put out decades earlier.

Their debut album, entitled Tamatebako, was released in 2014 and features guest vocals by Charles Plymell, DJ Scotch Egg, and fellow Go! Team member Kaori Tsuchida. The album title references the mysterious box of Japanese legend.

A tour in 2015 followed.

== Discography ==
=== Albums ===
- Tamatebako (Bleeding Heart Recordings, 2014)
