= Claude Pélieu =

French poet, translator and artist (1934–2002)

- Born: Claude Pélieu; December 20, 1934; Beauchamp, Val-d'Oise, France
- Died: December 24, 2002 (aged 68); Norwich, New York, U.S.
- Occupations: Poet, Artist & Translator
- Writing career
- Pen name: Claude Pelieu-Washburn, Claude Lieu
- Literary movement: Beat Generation, Postmodernism

Claude Pélieu (December 20, 1934 – December 24, 2002) was a French poet, translator and artist. He lived in France until 1963, when he moved to the United States, where he spent most of the rest on his life.

== Biography ==
Pélieu was born to Pierre and Marguerite Pélieu on December 20, 1934, in a clinic in Pontoise, Val d'Oise, north of Paris. They lived in the village of Beauchamp, near Pontoise.

After leaving school in 1952, Pélieu participated in a group show in Paris at the Galerie du Haut-Pavé at the centre Saint-Jacques, 8 rue Danton. Through the gallery's founder, priest Gilles Vallée, Pélieu met the future architect Henri Caubel who would later arrange retrospective shows of Pélieu's collages between 1999 and 2001. From 1952 to 1953, Pélieu worked at La Maison des amis des livres, a bookstore founded by Adrienne Monnier, a friend of Sylvia Beach, a second cousin of Mary Beach (Pélieu's second wife).

Some of Pélieu's first texts were published in 1955 in Le Libertaire, a political journal close to the Lettrist movement. At that time he was politically active in left-wing political groups. It was also around this time that Pélieu became interested in the poetry of Jacques Prévert but also in collage. He continued to draw assiduously, the sale of drawings provided a meager living. In 1956, he participated in a group show at the bookstore/gallery Le Soleil dans la Tête organized by the mother of Jean-Jacques Lévêque, Marguerite Fos.

Following trouble with the police, Pélieu was drafted into the French army at the height of the Algerian war. Whilst in Algeria, his texts appeared in Henri Chopin's poetry journal Cinquième Saison under the pseudonym Claude Lieu. He eventually poisoned himself by drinking stagnant water in order to be repatriated and discharged. After leaving hospital, on July 14, 1959, Pélieu met his first wife Lula Nash at a ball on Rue du Vieux-Colombier. The couple had a passionate relationship often accompanied by hardship, as Pélieu's physical and mental health continued to suffer from his experiences in Algeria and an addiction to heroin. Pélieu and Nash married on May 11, 1960, and lived between Paris and the Ile-de-Ré. In Paris, Pélieu frequented Jean-Jacques Lebel, lettrist Jean-Louis Brau and affichiste Raymond Hains.

Pélieu met Mary Beach, a recently widowed American expat, in 1962, and one year later Pélieu and Lula separated. In November 1963, Pélieu left for San Francisco with Mary Beach and Beach's teenage daughter. Upon their arrival, they contacted Lawrence Ferlinghetti at City Lights Bookstore in the hope of translating Allen Ginsberg's poetry and publishing Pélieu's work in English.

In the United States, Pélieu lived between San Francisco and New York, with a nomadic existence that saw them travel extensively around the country. Pélieu's Automatic Pilot was published at the end of 1964 by Ed Sanders' Fuck You Press in New York, having been translated from French into English by Beach. She also translated, in collaboration with Pélieu, several books by William Burroughs, Bob Kaufman and Allen Ginsberg. In 1966, Beach founded a publishing imprint, Beach Books, Texts and Documents, publishing not only writing by Pélieu but also facsimile manuscripts by leading beat writers, pamphlets, literary magazines and folios of collages.

From 1965 onwards, Pélieu corresponded extensively with Burroughs, amongst others. He became increasingly interested in Burroughs' cut-up technique, which he used extensively in book-length texts such as With revolvers aimed...finger bowls. Pélieu's writing was also featured alongside that of Burroughs and Kaufman in a Cahier de l'Herne after he met Dominique de Roux.

The years from 1969 to 1979 were particularly prolific for Pélieu in terms of publication, with a dozen or so books published through 1979, mostly by Bourgois and 10/18. He was also published by Fraçois di Dio's Soleil Noir, in editions that were accompanied by artworks by Erró and Miguel Ortiz Berrocal. In 1970, Pélieu and Beach left the United States for southern England, where they spent a number of years between London and Sussex. They returned to California in 1977 and later settled in upstate New York.

Between 1979 and 2002, Pélieu devoted himself increasingly to collage while continuing to write and publish episodically. At the end of the 1990s, several exhibits of his collages took place in France during a brief period when he and Beach returned to the country. His books continued to be published up until his death on December 24, 2002, in Norwich, New York.

== Selected bibliography ==
=== French ===
- Cahier de l'Herne Burroughs/Pélieu/Kaufman, L'Herne editions, Paris 1968.
- Ce que dit la bouche d'ombre dans le bronze-étoile d'une tête (What The Shadow Mouth says in the bronze-star of a head), Le soleil noir editions, Paris 1969
- Le Journal Blanc du hasard (The White Journal of Chance), Bourgois editions, Paris 1969
- Embruns d'exils traduits du silence (Sprays of exile translated from silence), Bourgois editions, Paris 1971
- Jukeboxes, 10/18 editions, Paris 1972
- Infra Noir (Below Black), with Erró & Thierry Agullo, Le Soleil noir editions, Paris 1972
- Tatouages mentholés et cartouches d'aube (Mint Tattoos and Dawn Cartridges), 10/18, Paris 1973
- Kali Yug Express, Bourgois editions, Paris 1974
- Coca néon arc-en-ciel polaroid (Coca neon polaroid rainbow), Bourgois editions, Paris 1976 / Cherry Valley Editions
- Dust Bowl Motel Poems, Bourgois editions, Paris 1977
- Pommes bleues électriques (Blue Electric Apples), Bourgois editions, Paris 1979
- Trains de nuit (Night trains), Le Cherche Midi editions, Paris 1979
- Cartes postales USA (Postcards USA), Cééditions, Toulouse 1979.
- Indigo Express, Le Livre à venir editions, Paris 1986
- Koans & Haikus, L'atelier de l'agneau editions, 1988
- La Rue est un rêve (The Street is a Dream), Le castor astral editions, Paris 1989
- Légende noire (Black Legend), Le Rocher editions, Monaco 1991
- Dear Laurie, Cahiers de nuit editions, Caen 1996
- Et vous aurez raison d'avoir tort! (And you are right to be wrong!) (Texts 1971-1977), SUEL editions, Guarbecque 1996
- Studio Réalité (Reality Studio), Le castor astral editions, Paris 1999
- Art Into Thick Air, collages, La Notonecte editions, Rennes 1999
- Soupe de lézard (Lizard Soup), La Digitale editions, Quimper 2000
- Boomerangs, La Notonecte editions, Rennes 1999 (reissued in 2001)
- Fusion, Voix editions, 2001
- Starquake, La Notonecte editions, Rennes 2001
- Anthologie introductive à l'oeuvre de Claude Pélieu (Introductory anthology to the work of Claude Pélieu), L'Arachnoide editions, 2003
- Je suis un cut-up vivant (I am a living cut-up), L'Arganier editions, Paris 2008
- Un amour de beatnik (A Beatnik Love), Non lieu editions, Paris 2012

=== English ===
- Automatic pilot, City Lights Books, San Francisco 1964
- With Revolvers Aimed... Finger Bowls, preface by William S. Burroughs, Beach Books Texts and documents, San Francisco, 1967
- So who owns death TV?, collaboration with William S. Burroughs and Carl H. Weissner, Beach Texts Books, San Francisco 1967
- Swift Scripts, Notes, and After Effects, Writers Forum, London 1967
- Opal USA, Beach Books, 1968
- Blue Bangh!, Expanded Media Editions, 1973 (with Mary Beach) German edition also issued same year
- Coca Neon / Polaroid Rainbow, Cherry Valley Editions, 1975
- Whistling Down the Wire, Cherry Valley Editions, 1977
- Xerox Blues, 1982
- Kali Yug Express, Bottle of Smoke Press 2012

=== German ===
- Mary Beach/Claude Pélieu, Collagen, Verlag Peter Engstler, 2011
- Art Into Thick Air (collages, color version), Verlag Peter Engstler, 2011
- Kali Yug Express, Verlag Peter Engstler, 2011
- Storgerausche vom Telegraphendraht (Whistling Down The Wire), Verlag Peter Engstler, 2011
