= Keep On Truckin' (comics) =

1968 comic by Robert Crumb

Original 1968 Keep On Truckin' cartoon, as published in Zap Comix.

Keep On Truckin' is a one-page cartoon by Robert Crumb, published in the first issue of Zap Comix in 1968. A visual burlesque of the lyrics of the Blind Boy Fuller song "Truckin' My Blues Away", it consists of an assortment of men, drawn in Crumb's distinctive style, strutting across various landscapes. The cartoon's images were imitated and much displayed during the hippie era.

== Copyright and licensing issues ==
The image has been imitated often without permission, appearing on T-shirts, posters, belt buckles, mudflaps, and other items. During the early 1970s, Crumb's lawyer started threatening lawsuits against anyone using the image without permission. Crumb and A.A. Sales, a producer of unlicensed Keep On Truckin' merchandise, reached a settlement of $750 for the past usage, but A.A. Sales continued to sell unlicensed products after the settlement without paying additional fees. In 1973, Crumb's case was accepted by United States District Court for the Northern District of California, and was heard by Judge Albert Charles Wollenberg, who had previously ruled against use of Walt Disney's characters in cartoon parodies by the cartoonists for the Air Pirates cartoons. A.A. Sales claimed the work was in the public domain, because Crumb had not included the copyright symbol on the work, although he had done so in Zap #1 as a whole. The work was protected by the terms of the 1909 Copyright Act, and any omission of notice was considered to cause the work to be public domain. The drawing had also appeared on the business card of Crumb's publisher without the copyright symbol. Based on that, Wollenberg granted A.A. Sales' request for summary judgment, and Keep On Truckin' became public domain. In 1977, the U.S. Court of Appeals reversed that decision, and it returned to copyrighted status.

Crumb was offered $100,000 by Toyota to reproduce the image for a Keep On Truckin' advertising campaign, but refused it.

Crumb has sued various entities to defend the copyright, including Amazon.com in 2005.

== Crumb's notions ==
Crumb used the cartoon as an example of what caused the discomfort he claims he felt with his sudden fame during the late 1960s, saying:

I became acutely self-conscious about what I was doing. Was I now a "spokesman" for the hippies or what? I had no idea how to handle my new position in society! ... Take Keep on Truckin... for example. Keep on Truckin'... is the curse of my life. This stupid little cartoon caught on hugely. There was a D.J. on the radio in the seventies who would yell out every ten minutes: "And don't forget to KEEP ON TR-R-RUCKIN'!" Boy, was that obnoxious! Big feet equals collective optimism. You're a-walkin' boy! You're movin' on down the line! It's proletarian. It's populist. I was thrown off track! I didn't want to turn into a greeting card artist for the counter-culture! I didn't want to do 'shtick'—the thing Lenny Bruce warned against. That's when I started to let out all of my perverse sex fantasies. It was the only way out of being "America's Best Loved Hippy Cartoonist".

In 1972, Crumb published a one-page self-parody of Keep On Truckin', which introduced a variety of new poses and slogans, including "Keep On Rollin' Along", "Keep On Chunkin'", "Keep On Toodlin'", and so on. The strip was covered in copyright symbols, and ended with an ironic suggestion that readers buy "Keep On Shuckin'" merchandise.
