= Up in Flames (film) =

- Directed by: John Seeman
- Produced by: Ecstasy Films
- Starring: Bob Robbins; John Seeman; Kelly Mint
- Distributed by: CVX
- Release date: 1978
- Running time: 60 minutes
- Country: United States
- Language: English

Up in Flames is a 1978 pornographic film and unauthorized adaptation of the underground comix The Fabulous Furry Freak Brothers by Gilbert Shelton and Mr. Natural by Robert Crumb. The film's title also parodies the contemporaneous Cheech & Chong movie Up in Smoke.

== Plot ==
Dolores, the Freak Brothers' landlady, is going to evict them unless they can come up with rent money. As a result, all three brothers find themselves victims of bedroom farces. Vinnie fakes being a painter, but his client wants other services anyway. Alas, when she later reveals she tricked him and still expects him to paint, he steals her purse. Meanwhile, Vinnie has sex with their landlady, just to find out she still expects her rent. She does however grant a postponement of some days to a female tenant who tries the same trick.

Lastly, Fat Freddy meets Mr. Natural, the 82-year-old proprietor of a health food store with his two employees who don't manage to sell his vitamins. Fat Freddy is indeed hired by Mr. Natural. But when he wants his payment, Mr. Natural puts "vita-beans" in his hands and has his employees fake being attracted to that. Fat Freddy thus accepts it instead of money.

Mr. Natural himself then agrees to get paid not in money when he brings a personal delivery to the female tenant. But when she tells him about the brothers' situation, he feels sorry and has Fat Freddy spike the landlady's drink with the "vita-beans", rendering her sick for about a week.

== Characters ==
The film is an unauthorized film adaptation of the Fabulous Furry Freak Brothers and Mr. Natural underground comics. However, two of the Freak Brothers have been renamed (to "Vinnie" and "Frank"), and none of the three "Freak Brothers" resembled their comic book counterparts. For instance, the actor portraying Fat Freddy was tall and thin, with straight brown hair and a small moustache. The film also did not focus on drug use, and instead consisted of the main characters "getting it on with some pretty skanky-looking chicks by 21st century standards."

Mr. Natural is played by the film's director, John Seeman, who dresses in a potato sack and wears a fake Santa Claus beard which he removes for the sex scenes.

== Production ==
The movie was probably produced c. 1974, although it was not released until 1978.

== Release ==
Up in Flames was released on DVD in 2016 by Synapse Films and Vinegar Syndrome.
