= Zap Comix =

Underground comic book

- Cover of Zap Comix #1 (Feb. 1968), art by R. Crumb.

Publication information
- Publisher: Apex Novelties (issues #0–3); Print Mint (issues #4–9); Last Gasp (issues #10–15); Fantagraphics (issue #16)
- Format: Ongoing series
- Genre: Underground
- Publication date: February 1968 – November 2014
- No. of issues: 17
- Main character(s): Mr. Natural; R. Crumb; Angelfood McSpade; Wonder Wart-Hog; Checkered Demon; Trashman

Creative team
- Created by: Robert Crumb
- Artist(s): Robert Crumb, Victor Moscoso, S. Clay Wilson, Gilbert Shelton, Spain Rodriguez, Robert Williams, Rick Griffin, Paul Mavrides

Zap Comix is an underground comix series which was originally part of the counterculture of the late 1960s. While a few small-circulation self-published satirical comic books had been printed prior to this, Zap became the model for the "comix" movement that snowballed after its release. The title itself published 17 issues over a period of 46 years.

Premiering in early 1968 as a showcase for the work of Robert Crumb, Zap was unlike any comic book that had been seen before. While working on Zap #1, Crumb saw a Family Dog poster drawn by Rick Griffin which resembled a psychedelic version of a Sunday funnies page. Its surreal, other-worldly imagery inspired him to think about comics in a new way, as seen in the art style of Zap #1's Abstract Expressionist Ultra Super Modernistic Comics. When Crumb started planning the next issue, he got in touch with Griffin, asking him to contribute to Zap #2. Griffin agreed and suggested bringing fellow poster artist Victor Moscoso on board. S. Clay Wilson, Gilbert Shelton, Robert Williams, and "Spain" Rodriguez were also contributors to Zap.

While the origin of the spelling "comix" is a subject of some dispute, it was popularized by its appearance in the title of the first issues of Zap. Design critic Steven Heller claims that the term "comix" ("co-mix") refers to the traditional comic book style of Zap, and its mixture of dirty jokes and storylines.

== Overview ==
Labeled "Fair Warning: For Adult Intellectuals Only", Zap #1 featured the publishing debut of Robert Crumb's much-bootlegged Keep on Truckin' imagery, an early appearance of unreliable holy man Mr. Natural and his neurotic disciple Flakey Foont, and the first of innumerable self-caricatures (in which Crumb calls himself "a raving lunatic", and "one of the world's last great medieval thinkers"). The debut issue included the story "Whiteman", which detailed the inner torment seething within the lusty, fearful heart of an outwardly upright American.

Crumb asked Griffin to collaborate on issue #2. Griffin suggested bringing fellow poster artist Victor Moscoso on board. Crumb added S. Clay Wilson and the four of them formed the Zap collective. Gilbert Shelton joined the crew with issue #3, and Robert Williams and "Spain" Rodriguez joined with issue #4. This group of artists remained mostly constant throughout the history of Zap.

Zap's new publisher the Print Mint weathered a lawsuit filed over the Zap #4, released in 1969, which featured among other things, Crumb's depiction of incest in a middle-class family. The publishers, Don and Alice Schenker, were arrested and charged with publishing pornography by the Berkeley Police Department. Previous to that, Simon Lowinsky, who had a gallery on College Avenue in Berkeley and had put up an exhibition of Crumb's original drawings, had been arrested on the same charge. His case came to trial first. He was acquitted after supportive testimony from Peter Selz, a prominent figure in the art world. At that point the city dropped the charges against the Print Mint. In a related case, however — also brought on by Zap #4 — the U.S. Supreme Court ruled in 1973 that local communities could decide their own First Amendment standards with reference to obscenity. In the mid-1970s, sale of drug paraphernalia was outlawed in many places, and the distribution network for these comics (and the underground newspapers) dried up, leaving mail order as the only commercial outlet for underground titles.

Contributor Rick Griffin died in 1991; Paul Mavrides made his debut as a Zap contributor in issue #14 (1998). Mavrides was invited to contribute when Crumb announced that he no longer wanted to work on Zap, although Crumb never did actually quit the title.

== Publication history ==
Zap #1 was published in San Francisco in early 1968. Some 3,500 copies were printed by Beat writer Charles Plymell, who arranged with publisher Don Donahue for Zap to be the first title put out under Donahue's Apex Novelties imprint.

The contents of the first Zap were not intended to be the debut issue. Philadelphia publisher Brian Zahn (who had published earlier works of R. Crumb in his Philadelphia-based underground newspaper Yarrowstalks) had intended to publish an earlier version of the comic, but reportedly left the country with the artwork. Rather than repeat himself, Crumb drew a new assortment of strips, which replaced the missing issue.

The tagline of Zap #1, "Zap Comics are Squinky Comics!!" has an interesting origin. Art Spiegelman called his girlfriend of the time, Isabella Fiske, "Squink", Crumb liked the word and decided to use it on the cover. Crumb himself credits Gershon Legman's 1949 article "Love and Death" condemning the "horror-squinky" in 1940s comics.

In late 1968, shortly before Zap #3 was to be published, Crumb found Xerox copies of the missing pages from the original Zap #1, which (according to fellow Zap contributor Victor Moscoso) successfully captured the linework but not the solid blacks. After being re-inked by Crumb, those strips subsequently appeared as Zap #0. Thus Zap #0 became the third in the series (even though it was drawn before #1 in 1967), and Zap #3 the fourth.

With issue #4 (Aug. 1969), Zap moved publishers to the Print Mint, which weathered a lawsuit related to its contents. A 1973 U.S. Supreme Court ruling led to the collapse of the underground comix market, and after that, Zap was published sporadically, with it being typical for three to five years to pass between new issues. Zap continued to be published by Print Mint through issue #9 (1978), when the company stopped publishing comics altogether.

From issue #10 (1982) onward, Zap was published by Last Gasp (which also published many reprints of earlier issues). Again, there were often long periods between issues: altogether, five issues of Zap were published (by Print Mint and Last Gasp) in the 1970s, three issues in the 1980s, and two issues in the 1990s. Zap #15 (ISBN 0867196351) came out in 2005, seven years after the previous issue.

Issues #13–15 all featured cameos by sex-positive feminist Susie Bright as a character within its pages (or on the cover).

A limited edition six-volume hardcover box set containing the complete Zap Comix (ISBN 9781606997871) was published by Fantagraphics in November 2014. Besides including an oral history, portfolio, and previously unseen material, the set also included the never-before published Zap Comix #16 — the final issue in the series. Zap #16 would later be released by Fantagraphics as a stand-alone, 80-page comic in February 2016, with a few changes and additions.

== Circulation ==
The first issue of Zap was sold on the streets of Haight-Ashbury out of a baby stroller pushed by Crumb's wife Dana on the first day. In years to come, the comic's sales would be most closely linked with alternative venues such as head shops.

Due to its unusual outside position in the comic distribution industry, a completely accurate count of Zap's circulation cannot be known, but overall sales for the comic's first 16 issues are in the millions.

== Jams ==
From issue #3 forward (with the exception of issue #8), every issue of the title featured a group jam by the "Zap collective", where the cartoonists would pass a story around, each one contributing panels to the overall story (which was usually no more than two pages).

In addition, in June 1970, the collective did the one-page jam "Science Fiction Comics" along with Harvey Kurtzman, which was published in East Village Other vol. 6, #1. In 1974, between issues #7 and #8 of Zap Comix, the collective produced Zam (Zap Jam), an entire 36-page comic filled with their jams.

=== List of Zap jams ===
- "Atomic Comics", 3 pages in Zap #3
- "Jam", 3 pages in Zap #4
- "Micro-Minnie", 15 pages in Zap #5
- "Mammy Jama", 1 page in Zap #6
- ["All nite comix..."], 2 pages in Zam-Zap Jam (The Print Mint, 1974)
- "Zyklon Jam - Souvenir of the Carnage", 1 page in Zap #8
- "The Sky Is, In Fact, Falling" ("Four Guys Comics"), 1 page in Zap #9
- "Toe Jam Comix", 1 page in Zap #10
- "The Constipated Chaos Consortium", 1 page in Zap #11
- "Rotten to the Core", 2 pages in Zap #12
- "Bark All You Want, You Can't Bite Me Now — A Shaggy Fish Story", 3 pages in Zap #13
- "The Last Lunch", 2 pages in Zap #13 — dedicated to the memory of Rick Griffin
- "(Self) Important Comics", 2 pages in Zap #14
- "Circle of Jerks", 2 pages in Zap #15

== Featured characters ==
- Angelfood McSpade (R. Crumb) — a large-built black woman drawn as a racist African native caricature. She is usually depicted being sexually exploited or manipulated by men. She appears in issues #2 and #0.
- Captain Pissgums and his Pervert Pirates (S. Clay Wilson) — a crew of bisexual male drug-addict pirates that are into a series of kinky and outré sexual acts. Captain Pissgums' nemesis is Captain Fatima and the butch all-female crew of the SS Quivering Thigh. (Note: A "Captain Pysse-Gummes" is mentioned as one of the captains attending the Pirate's Conference in The League of Extraordinary Gentlemen.) He appears in issues #3, 10, and 15.
- The Checkered Demon (S. Clay Wilson) — portly, shirtless demon frequently called upon to kill the various demented bikers, pirates, and rapists who populate Wilson's universe. He appears in issues #2, 4, 5, and 8–15.
- Coochy Cooty (Robert Williams) — sinner, substance abuser, fornicator, and bad-ass antihero who wears a flower pot hat. He appears in issues #5, 6, and 8–13.
- R. Crumb (R. Crumb) — self-caricature portrayed as "a raving lunatic" and "one of the world's last great medieval thinkers". He appears in issues #0, 1, 6–8, 10, 11, and 13–15.
- Dirty Dog (R. Crumb) — an anthropomorphic animal comic in which the hero is a horny long-eared hound dog. An all-seeing god is portrayed by a rabbit in a straw boater and striped vest with a movie camera. The character appears in issue #3.
- Mr. Goodbar (R. Crumb) - a clueless hick in suspenders that seems to be the opposite of Mr. Natural. He appears in issue #3.
- Mr. Natural (R. Crumb) — unreliable holy man and his neurotic disciple Flakey Foont. He appears in issues #0 and #1–7.
- Trashman (Spain) — hero of the working classes and champion of radical left-wing causes. He appears in issues #11–13.
- Wonder Wart-Hog, the "Hog of Steel" (Gilbert Shelton) — a violent reactionary amoral "superhero" who hypocritically murders and rapes people he doesn't approve of. His alter ego is reporter Philbert DeSanex. He appears in issues #3-5, 13, and 15.

== Issue guide ==
#	Date	Publisher	Cover artist	Contributors	Notes
1	Feb. 1968	Apex Novelties	Robert Crumb	Robert Crumb	First comics appearance of Mr. Natural, Flakey Foont, and Whiteman; first published appearance of the Keep on Truckin' image. Later printings by Print Mint and then Last Gasp.
2	Aug. 1968	Apex Novelties	Crumb	Crumb, Rick Griffin, Victor Moscoso, S. Clay Wilson	Wilson, Griffin, and Moscoso join the Zap crew. First comics appearance of Angelfood McSpade and The Checkered Demon. Later printings by Print Mint and then Last Gasp.
0	Late 1968	Apex Novelties	Crumb	Crumb	Originally created prior to Zap #1. Later printings by Print Mint and then Last Gasp.
3	Fall 1968	Apex Novelties	(flip book) Griffin and Wilson	Crumb, Griffin, Moscoso, Gilbert Shelton, Wilson	Flip book subtitled "Special 69 Issue". Shelton joins the team. First appearance of Wilson's Captain Piss-Gums and his Pervert Pirates. Later printings by Print Mint and then by Last Gasp.
4	Aug. 1969	Print Mint	Moscoso	Crumb, Griffin, Moscoso, Shelton, Spain Rodriguez, Robert Williams, Wilson	Williams and Spain join. Crumb's infamous "Joe Blow" strip leads to obscenity lawsuit. Later printings by Last Gasp.
5	May 1970	Print Mint	Shelton	Charles Crumb, R. Crumb, Moscoso, Shelton, Spain, Williams, Wilson	Printed by Print Mint despite Apex Novelties logo on cover. Crumb's story is redrawn from childhood comics done with his brother Charles. Later printings by Last Gasp.
6	Jan. 1973	Print Mint	Shelton	Crumb, Griffin, Moscoso, Shelton, Spain, Williams, Wilson	Later printings by Last Gasp.
7	Mar. 1973	Print Mint	Spain	Crumb, Moscoso, Griffin, Shelton, Spain, Williams, Wilson	Last contribution from Griffin until issue #11. Later printings by Last Gasp.
8	1975	Print Mint	Crumb	Crumb, Moscoso, Shelton, Spain, Williams, Wilson	Later printings by Last Gasp.
9	1978	Print Mint	Wilson	Crumb, Moscoso, Shelton, Spain, Williams, Wilson	10th anniversary issue. Later printings by Last Gasp.
10	1982	Last Gasp	Moscoso	Crumb, Moscoso, Shelton, Spain, Williams, Wilson	
11	Feb. 1985	Last Gasp	Williams	Crumb, Griffin, Moscoso, Shelton, Spain, Williams, Wilson	Griffin returns.
12	1989	Last Gasp	Spain	Crumb, Griffin, Moscoso, Shelton, Spain, Williams, Wilson	Last contribution from Griffin (who died in 1991).
13	1994	Last Gasp	Moscoso	Crumb, Moscoso, Shelton, Spain, Williams, Wilson	
14	1998	Last Gasp	Wilson	Crumb, Paul Mavrides, Moscoso, Spain, Shelton, Williams, Wilson	Mavrides joins the crew; a number of the contributors portray their version of the dispute between Crumb and Moscoso over the direction of the title.
15	2005	Last Gasp	Mavrides	Crumb, Mavrides, Moscoso, Shelton, Spain, Williams, Wilson	
16	Nov. 2014	Fantagraphics	Crumb	R. Crumb, Griffin (posthumous), Aline Kominsky-Crumb, Mavrides, Moscoso, Shelton, Spain, Williams, Wilson	New member Kominsky-Crumb collaborates with her husband R. Crumb. Originally part of Zap collection, it was released in Feb. 2016 as a stand-alone 96-page comic. 16 pages in color.
