= Internment of Japanese Americans =

Mass incarceration in the U.S. during WWII

Japanese American incarceration
- Part of the United States home front during World War II
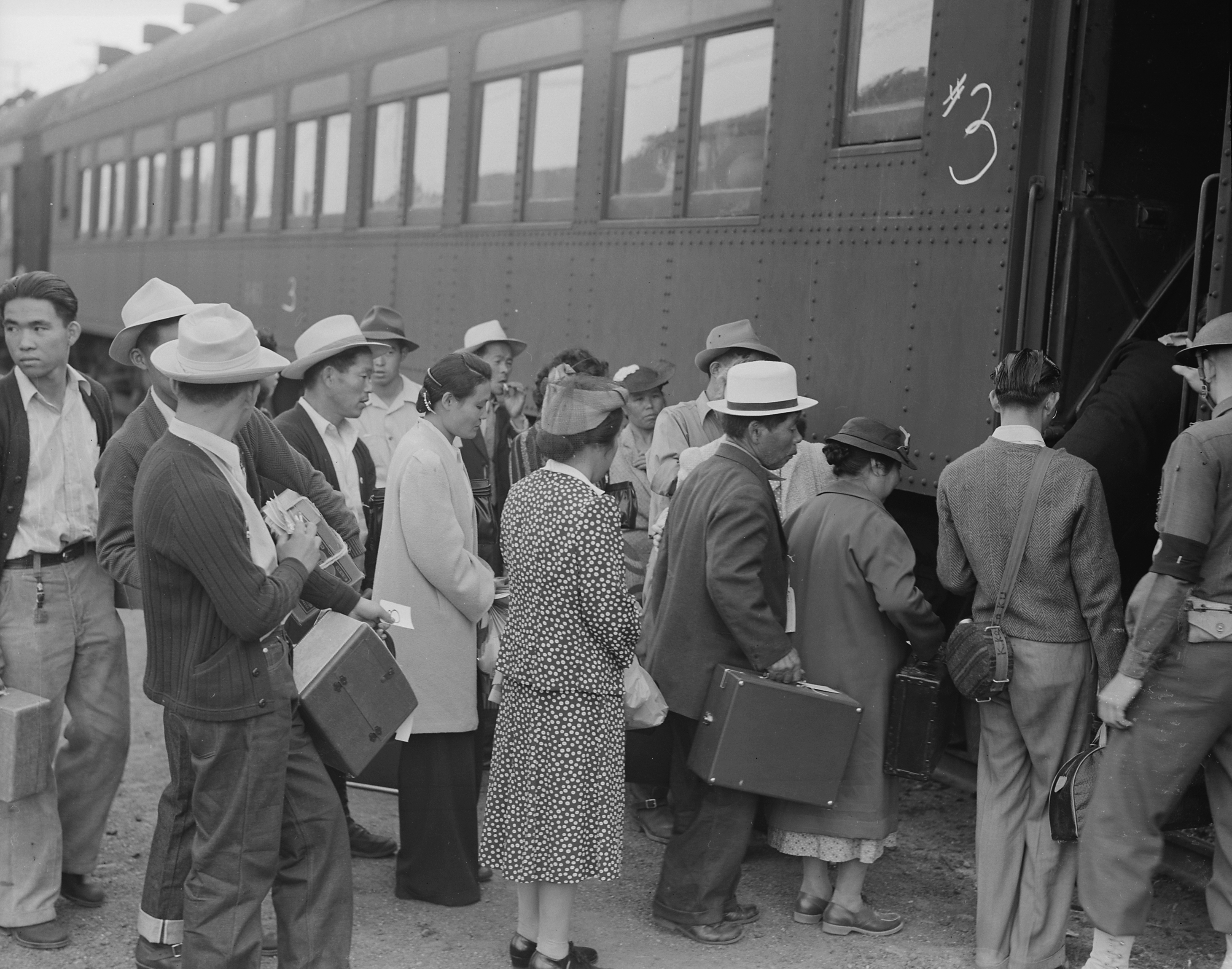
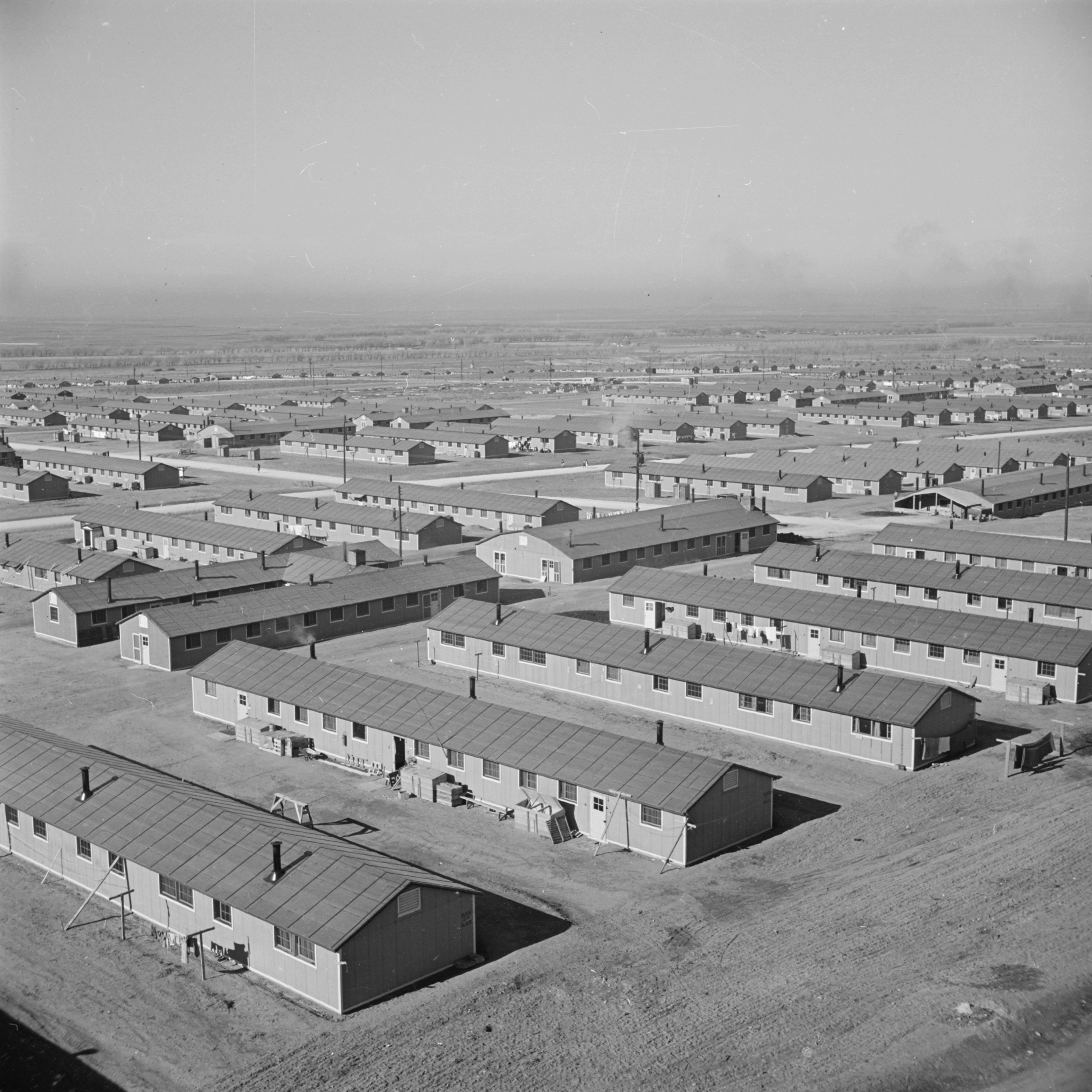
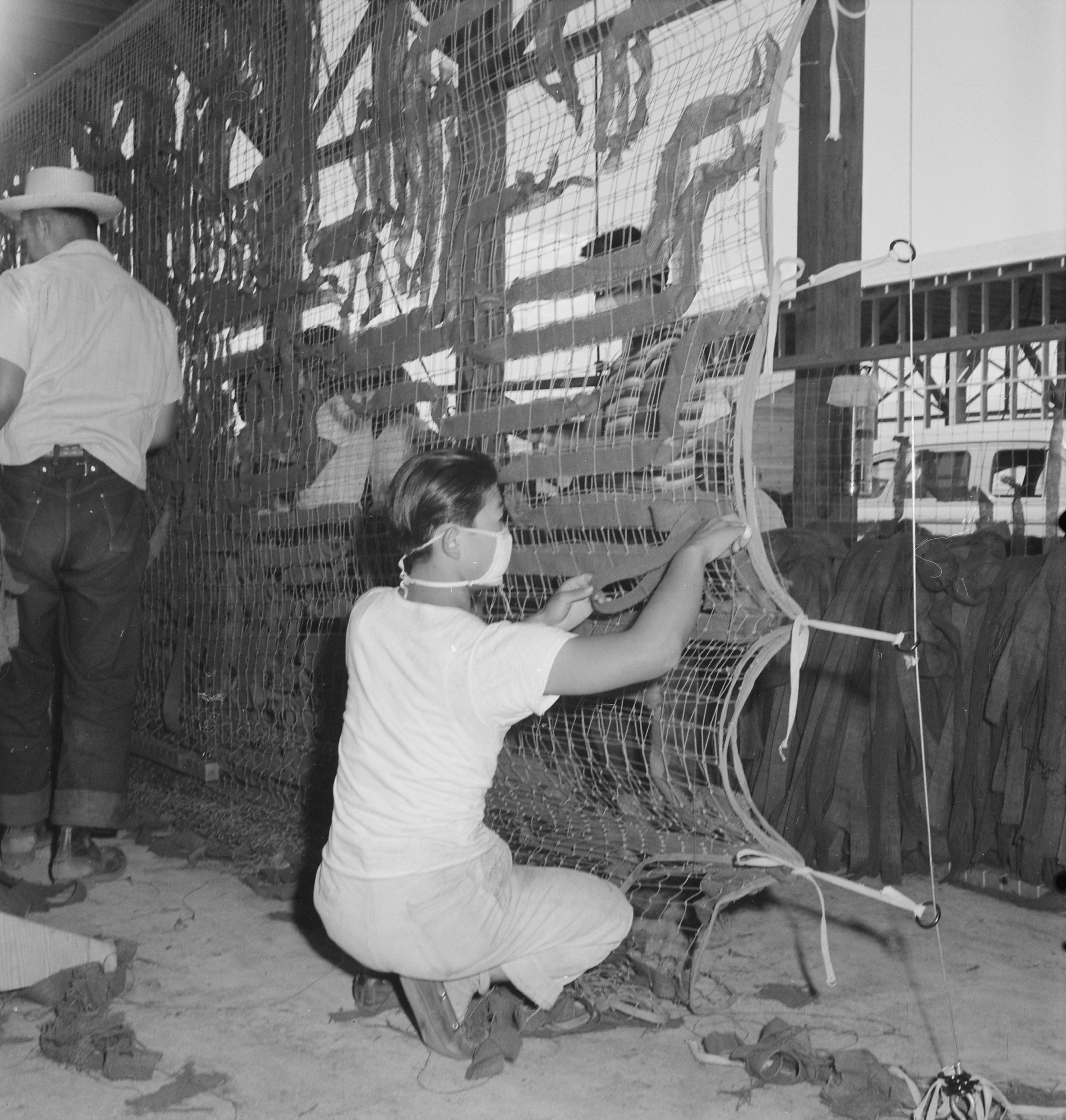
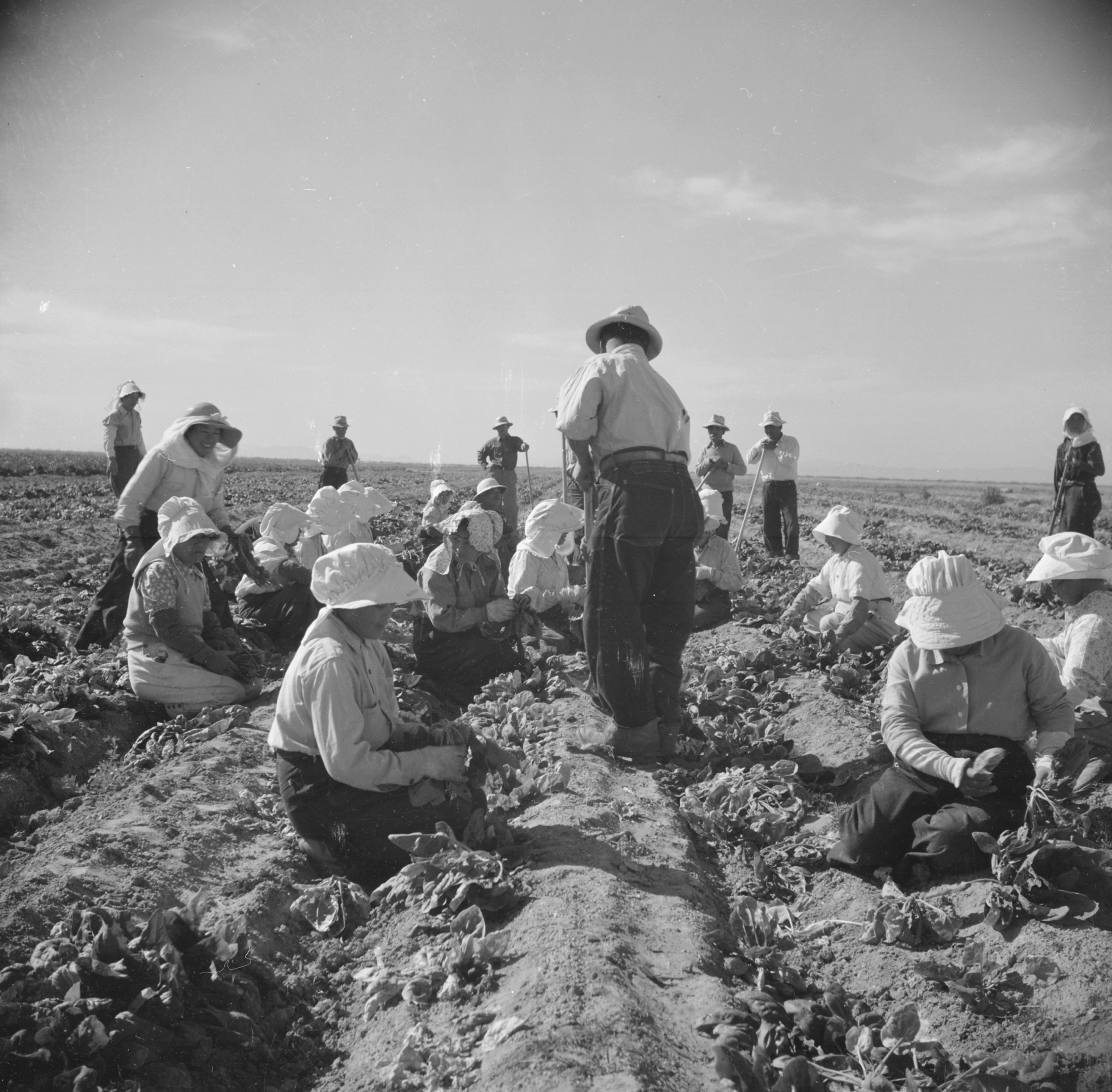
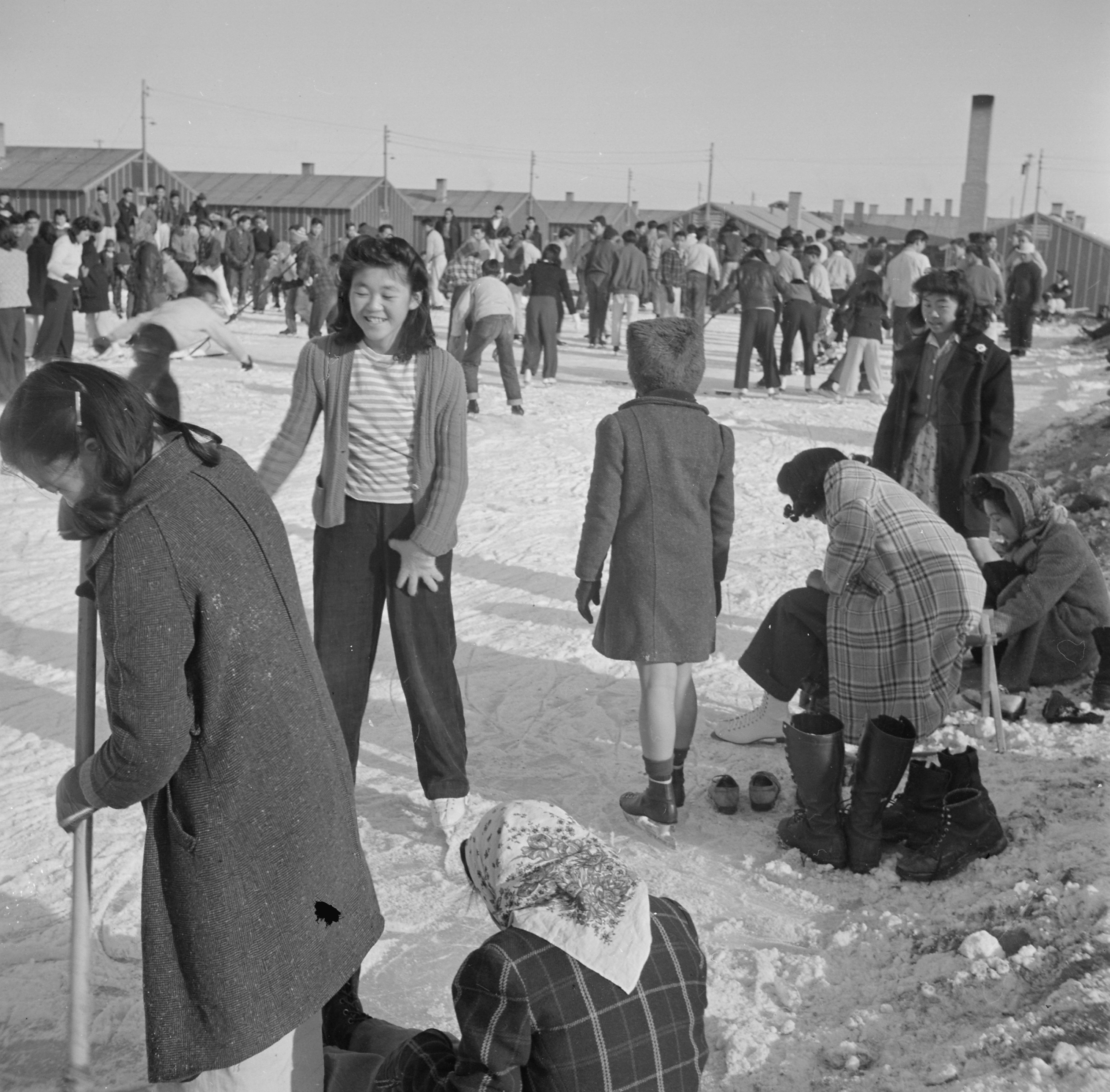
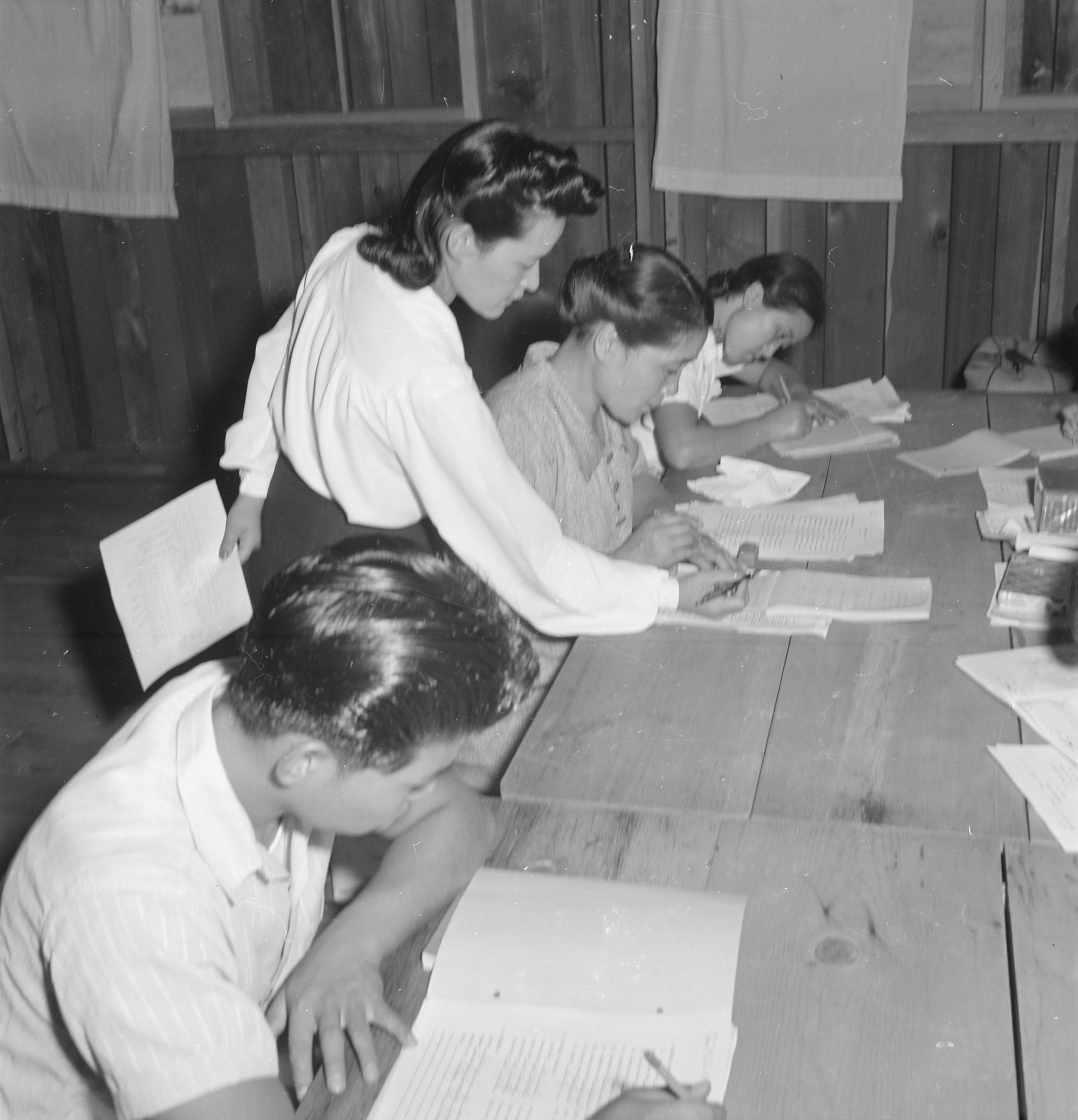
- Clockwise from top left: Boarding a train in Woodland, California; Granada Relocation Center in Colorado; Harvesting spinach at Gila River; Adults in class at Manzanar; Ice skating at Heart Mountain; Making camouflage nets for the War Department
- Date: February 19, 1942 – March 20, 1946
- Location: Western United States
- Cause: Executive Order 9066 signed by Franklin D. Roosevelt
- Motive: Anti-Japanese racism; Hysteria following the attack on Pearl Harbor, the Niʻihau incident, and the Bombardment of Ellwood
- Perpetrators: United States federal government: California Governor Earl Warren; Lieutenant General John L. DeWitt
- Outcome: Partial financial compensation for lost property under the Japanese-American Claims Act of 1948 signed by Harry Truman; Formal apology and financial reparations given to surviving victims under the Civil Liberties Act of 1988 signed by Ronald Reagan
- Deaths: At least 1,862; at least 7 homicides by sentries
- Inquiries: Commission on Wartime Relocation and Internment of Civilians (1983)
- Prisoners: 120,000 Japanese Americans living on the West Coast
- Supreme Court cases: Hirabayashi v. United States (1943); Yasui v. United States (1943); Korematsu v. United States (1944); Ex parte Endo (1944)

During World War II, about 120,000 people of Japanese descent were forcibly relocated and incarcerated in 10 concentration camps in the United States, operated by the War Relocation Authority (WRA), mostly in the western interior of the country. About two-thirds were U.S. citizens. These actions were initiated by Executive Order 9066, issued by President Franklin D. Roosevelt on February 19, 1942, following Imperial Japan's attack on Pearl Harbor on December 7, 1941. About 127,000 Japanese Americans then lived in the continental U.S., of which about 112,000 lived on the West Coast. About 80,000 were Nisei ('second generation'; American-born Japanese with U.S. citizenship) and Sansei ('third generation', the children of Nisei). The rest were Issei ('first generation') immigrants born in Japan, who were ineligible for citizenship. In Hawaii, where more than 150,000 Japanese Americans comprised more than one-third of the territory's population, only 1,200 to 1,800 were incarcerated.

Internment was intended to mitigate a security risk which Japanese Americans were believed to pose. Military authorities justified exclusion by claiming that an "unascertained number" of potentially disloyal Japanese Americans remained on the West Coast and that immediate separation between loyal and disloyal was impracticable. Military necessity was interpreted broadly to include not only direct defense concerns, but also civilian morale and broader wartime considerations. The implementation of internment developed in stages, progressing from asset restriction measures to large-scale removal and incarceration. The scale of the incarceration in proportion to the size of the Japanese American population far surpassed similar measures undertaken against German and Italian Americans who numbered in the millions and of whom some thousands were interned, most of these non-citizens. Following the executive order, the entire West Coast was designated as a military exclusion area, and all Japanese Americans who were living there were taken to assembly centers before they were sent to concentration camps in California, Arizona, Wyoming, Colorado, Utah, Idaho, and Arkansas. Similar actions were taken against individuals of Japanese descent in Canada. The internees were prohibited from taking more than they could carry into the camps, and many of them were forced to sell either some or all of their property, including their homes and their businesses. Inside the camps, which were surrounded by barbed wire fences and were patrolled by armed guards, the internees frequently lived in overcrowded barracks which contained minimal furnishings.

In its 1944 decision Korematsu v. United States, the U.S. Supreme Court upheld the constitutionality of the removals under the Due Process Clause of the Fifth Amendment to the United States Constitution. Although the Court upheld exclusion under wartime necessity, the decision acknowledged that ancestry based distinctions would ordinarily conflict with constitutional equality principles. The Court limited its decision to the validity of the exclusion orders, avoiding the issue of the incarceration of U.S. citizens without due process, but ruled on the same day in Ex parte Endo that a loyal citizen could not be detained, which began their release. On December 17, 1944, the exclusion orders were rescinded, and nine of the ten camps were shut down by the end of 1945. Japanese Americans were initially barred from U.S. military service, but by 1943, they were allowed to join, with 20,000 serving during the war. Over 4,000 students were allowed to leave the camps to attend college. Hospitals in the camps recorded 5,981 births and 1,862 deaths during incarceration.

In the 1970s, under mounting pressure from the Japanese American Citizens League (JACL) and redress organizations, President Jimmy Carter appointed the Commission on Wartime Relocation and Internment of Civilians (CWRIC) to investigate whether the internment had been justified. In 1983, the commission's report, Personal Justice Denied, found little evidence of Japanese disloyalty and concluded that internment had been the product of racism. Subsequent scholarship also found that government officials had withheld information that undermined claims that Japanese Americans posed a significant security threat. It recommended that the government pay reparations to the detainees. In 1988, President Ronald Reagan signed the Civil Liberties Act of 1988, which officially apologized and authorized a payment of $20,000 (equivalent to $54,000 in 2025) to each former detainee who was still alive when the act was passed. The legislation admitted that the government's actions were based on "race prejudice, war hysteria, and a failure of political leadership." By 1992, the U.S. government eventually disbursed more than $1.6 billion (equivalent to $4.36 billion in 2025) in reparations to 82,219 Japanese Americans who had been incarcerated.

== Background ==
=== Prior use of internment camps in the United States ===
The United States government had previously employed civilian internment policies in a variety of circumstances. During the 1830s, civilians who were members of the indigenous Cherokee nation were evicted from their homes and detained in "emigration depots" in Alabama and Tennessee prior to their deportation to Oklahoma following the passage of the Indian Removal Act in 1830. Similar internment policies were carried out by U.S. territorial authorities against the Dakota and Navajo peoples during the American Indian Wars in the 1860s. In 1901, during the Philippine–American War, General J. Franklin Bell ordered the detainment of Filipino civilians in the provinces of Batangas and Laguna into U.S. Army-run concentration camps in order to prevent them from collaborating with Filipino General Miguel Malvar's guerrillas; over 11,000 people died in the camps from malnutrition and disease.

After the United States entered World War I in 1917, roughly 6,300 German-born residents of the United States were arrested, with 2,048 of those residents being incarcerated on two U.S. Army bases, where they remained interned until 1920. However, these policies did not apply to German-American U.S. citizens because they only targeted a small fraction of German-born Americans.

=== Japanese Americans before World War II ===
Due in large part to socio-political changes which stemmed from the Meiji Restoration—and a recession which was caused by the abrupt opening of Japan's economy to the world economy—people emigrated from the Empire of Japan after 1868 in search of employment. From 1869 to 1924, approximately 200,000 Japanese immigrated to the islands of Hawaii, mostly laborers expecting to work on the islands' sugar plantations. Some 180,000 went to the U.S. mainland, with the majority of them settling on the West Coast and establishing farms or small businesses. Most arrived before 1908, when the Gentlemen's Agreement between Japan and the United States banned the immigration of unskilled laborers. A loophole allowed the wives of men who were already living in the US to join their husbands. The practice of women marrying by proxy and immigrating to the U.S. resulted in a large increase in the number of "picture brides."

As the Japanese American population continued to grow, European Americans who lived on the West Coast resisted the arrival of this ethnic group, fearing competition, and making the exaggerated claim that hordes of Asians would take over white-owned farmland and businesses. Groups such as the Asiatic Exclusion League, the California Joint Immigration Committee, and the Native Sons of the Golden West organized in response to the rise of this "Yellow Peril." They successfully lobbied to restrict the property and citizenship rights of Japanese immigrants, just as similar groups had previously organized against Chinese immigrants. Beginning in the late 19th century, several laws and treaties which attempted to slow immigration from Japan were introduced. The Immigration Act of 1924, which followed the example of the 1882 Chinese Exclusion Act, effectively banned all immigration from Japan and other "undesirable" Asian countries.

The 1924 ban on immigration produced unusually well-defined generational groups within the Japanese American community. The Issei were exclusively those Japanese who had immigrated before 1924; some of them desired to return to their homeland. Because no more immigrants were permitted, all Japanese Americans who were born after 1924 were born in the U.S. and by law, they were automatically considered U.S. citizens. The members of this Nisei generation constituted a cohort which was distinct from the cohort which their parents belonged to. In addition to the usual generational differences, Issei men were typically ten to fifteen years older than their wives, making them significantly older than the younger children in their often large families. U.S. law prohibited Japanese immigrants from becoming naturalized citizens, making them dependent on their children whenever they rented or purchased property. Communication between English-speaking children and parents who mostly or completely spoke in Japanese was often difficult. A significant number of older Nisei, many of whom were born prior to the immigration ban, had married and already started families of their own by the time the US entered World War II.

Despite racist legislation which prevented Issei from becoming naturalized citizens (or owning property, voting, or running for political office), these Japanese immigrants established communities in their new hometowns. Japanese Americans contributed to the agriculture of California and other Western states, by introducing irrigation methods which enabled them to cultivate fruits, vegetables, and flowers on previously inhospitable land.

In both rural and urban areas, kenjinkai, community groups for immigrants from the same Japanese prefecture, and fujinkai, Buddhist women's associations, organized community events and did charitable work, provided loans and financial assistance and built Japanese language schools for their children. Excluded from setting up shop in white neighborhoods, nikkei-owned small businesses thrived in the Nihonmachi, or Japantowns of urban centers, such as Los Angeles, San Francisco, and Seattle.

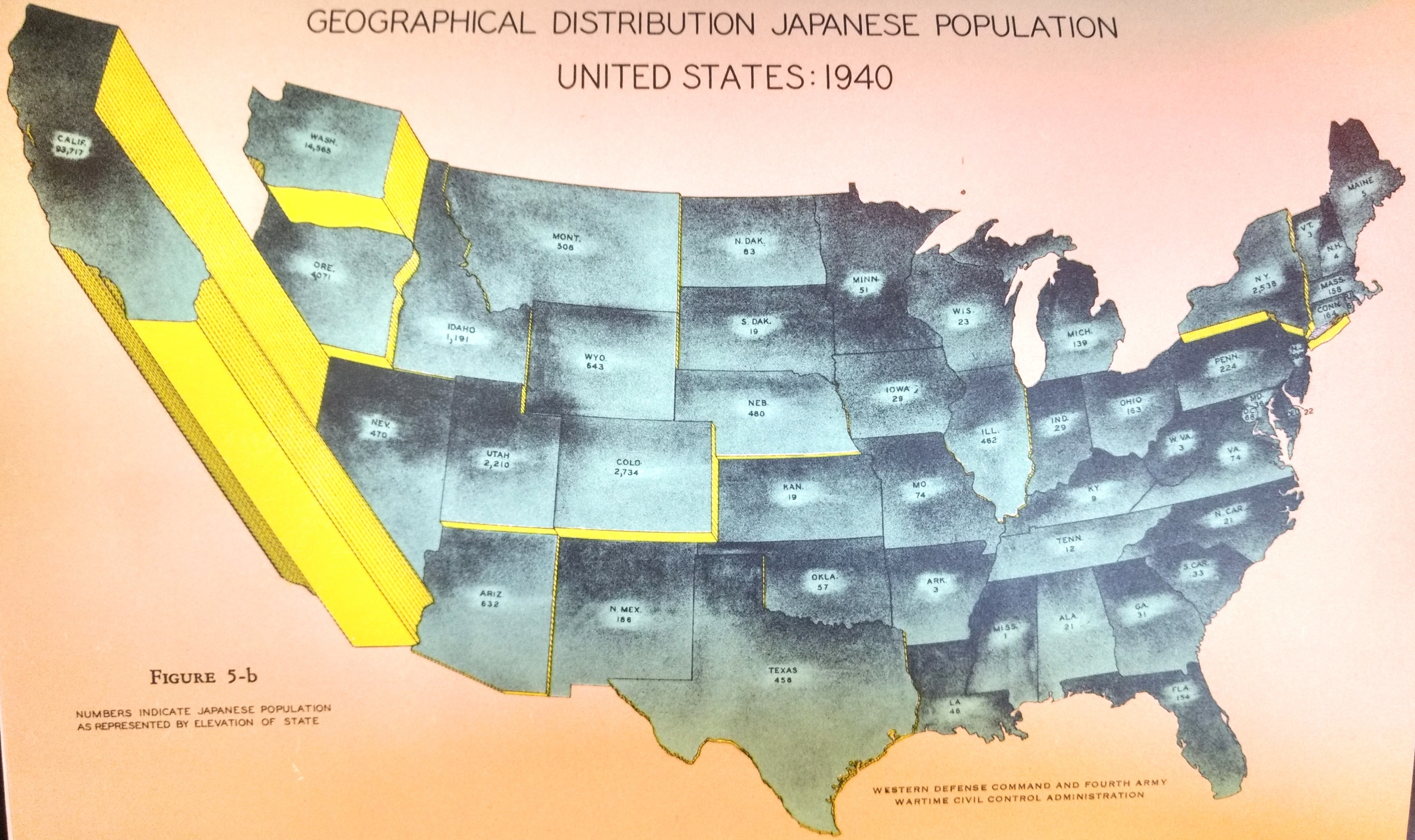
A per-state population map of the Japanese American population, with California leading with 93,717, from Final Report, Japanese Evacuation from the West Coast 1942

In the 1930s, the Office of Naval Intelligence (ONI), concerned as a result of Imperial Japan's rising military power in Asia, began to conduct surveillance in Japanese American communities in Hawaii. Starting in 1936, at the behest of President Roosevelt, the ONI began to compile a "special list of those Japanese Americans who would be the first to be placed in a concentration camp in the event of trouble" between Japan and the United States. In 1939, again by order of the President, the ONI, Military Intelligence Division, and FBI began working together to compile a larger Custodial Detention Index. Early in 1941, Roosevelt commissioned Curtis Munson to conduct an investigation on Japanese Americans living on the West Coast and in Hawaii. After working with FBI and ONI officials and interviewing Japanese Americans and those familiar with them, Munson determined that the "Japanese problem" was nonexistent. His final report to the President, submitted November 7, 1941, "certified a remarkable, even extraordinary degree of loyalty among this generally suspect ethnic group." A subsequent report by Kenneth Ringle (ONI), delivered to the President in January 1942, also found little evidence to support claims of Japanese American disloyalty and argued against mass incarceration.

=== Roosevelt's racial attitudes toward Japanese Americans ===
During the 1920s, Roosevelt wrote articles in the Macon Telegraph in which he expressed his opposition to white-Japanese intermarriages based on his fear that if they were not outlawed, such marriages would foster "the mingling of Asiatic blood with European or American blood" and in those articles, he also praised California's ban on land ownership by the first-generation Japanese. In 1936, while he was president of the United States, he privately wrote, in reference to contact between Japanese sailors and the local Japanese American population in the event of war, that "every Japanese citizen or non-citizen on the Island of Oahu who meets these Japanese ships or has any connection with their officers or men should be secretly but definitely identified and his or her name placed on a special list of those who would be the first to be placed in a concentration camp."

=== After the attack on Pearl Harbor ===
In the weeks immediately following the attack on Pearl Harbor the president disregarded the advice of advisors, notably John Franklin Carter, who urged him to speak out in defense of the rights of Japanese Americans.

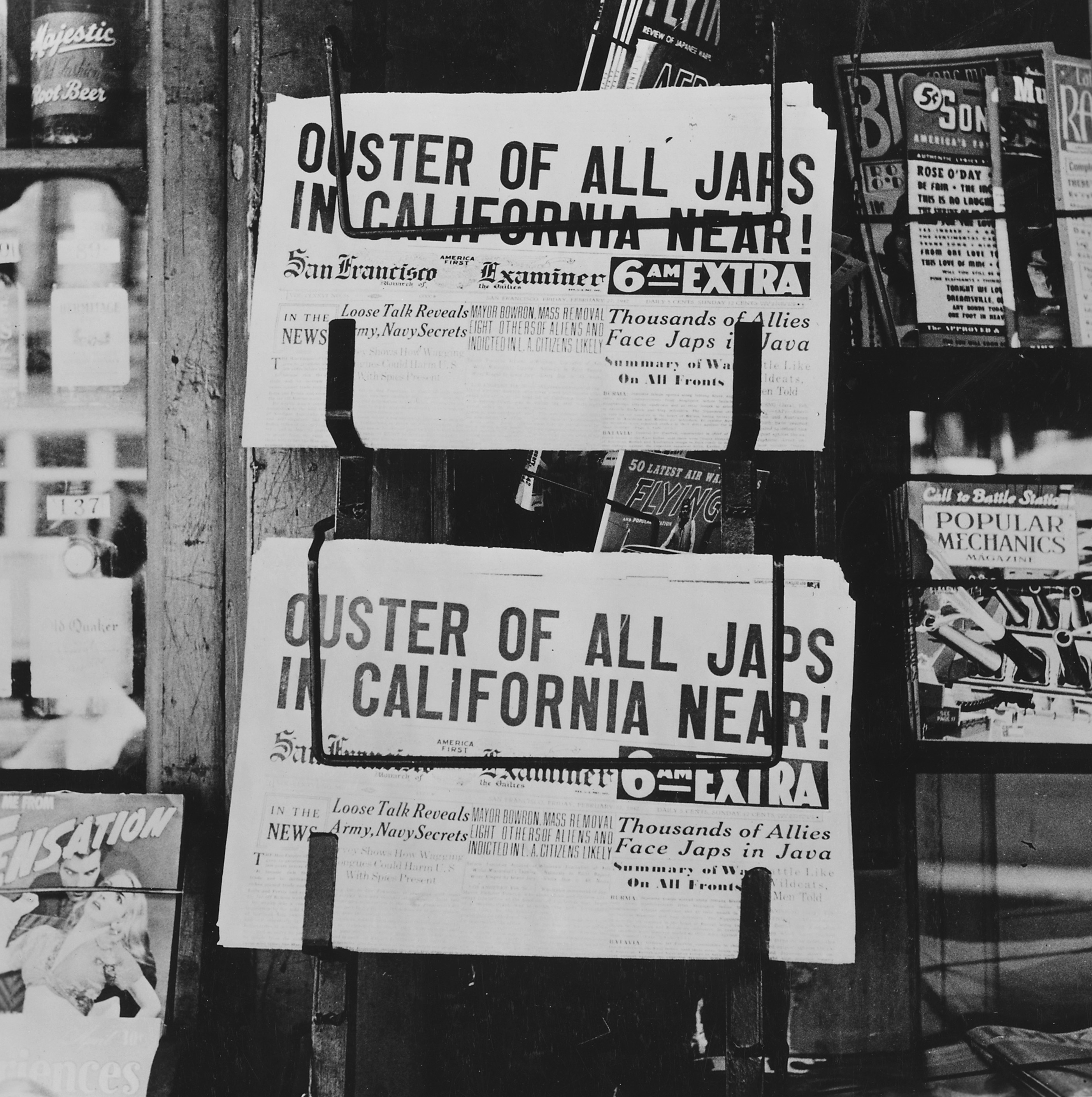
The San Francisco Examiner, April 1942

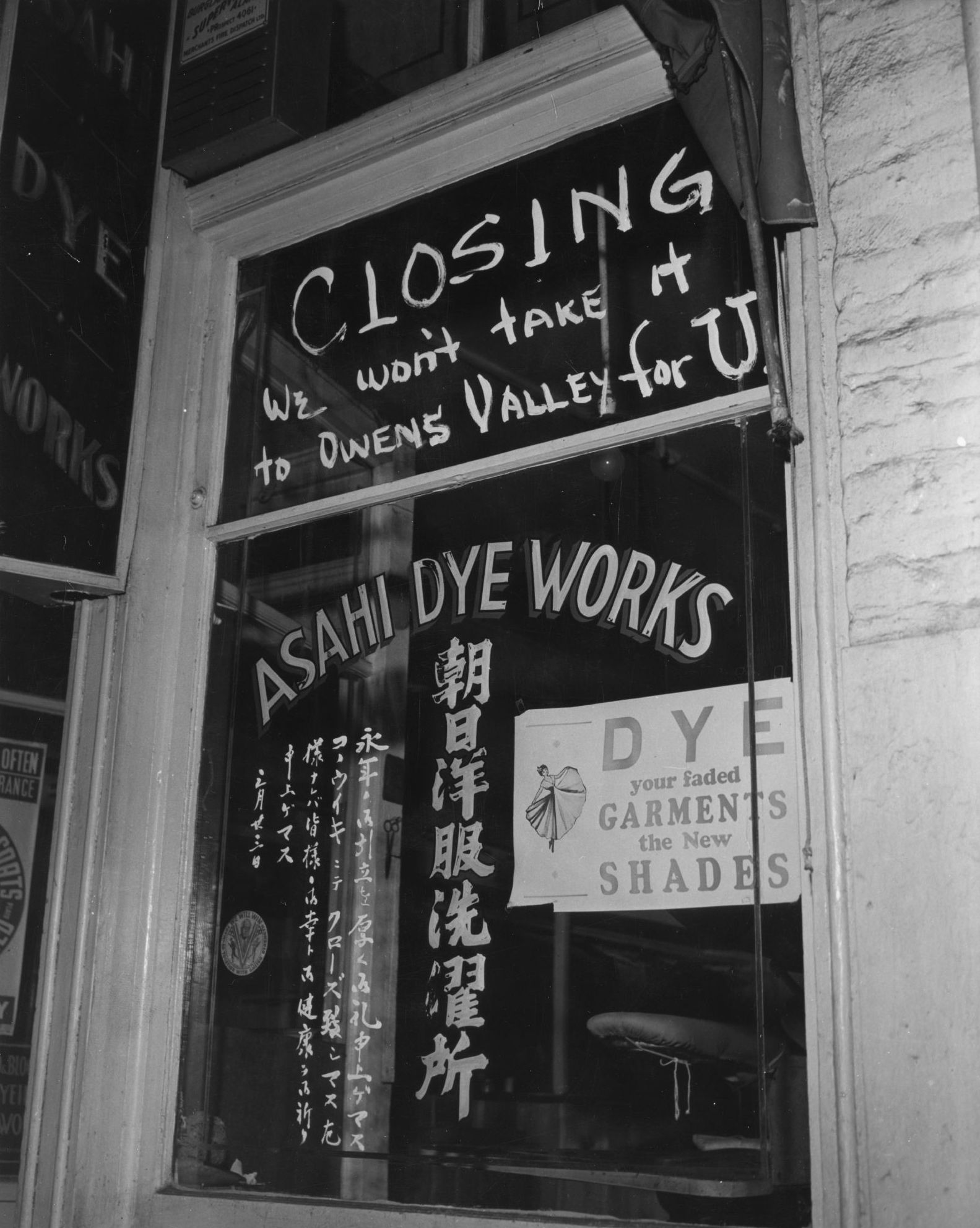
A Japanese American shop closing, Asahi Dye Works, Little Tokyo, Los Angeles. The notice on the front is a reference to Manzanar, Owens Valley being the first and one of the largest Japanese American detention centers.

The surprise attack on Pearl Harbor on December 7, 1941, led military and political leaders to suspect that Imperial Japan was preparing a full-scale invasion of the United States West Coast. Due to Japan's rapid military conquest of a large portion of Asia and the Pacific including a small portion of the U.S. West Coast (i.e., Aleutian Islands Campaign) between 1937 and 1942, some Americans feared that its military forces were unstoppable.

American public opinion initially stood by the large population of Japanese Americans living on the West Coast, with the Los Angeles Times characterizing them as "good Americans, born and educated as such." Many Americans believed that their loyalty to the United States was unquestionable. Though some in the administration (including Attorney General Francis Biddle and FBI Director J. Edgar Hoover) dismissed all rumors of Japanese American espionage on behalf of the Japanese war effort, pressure mounted upon the administration as the tide of public opinion turned against Japanese Americans.

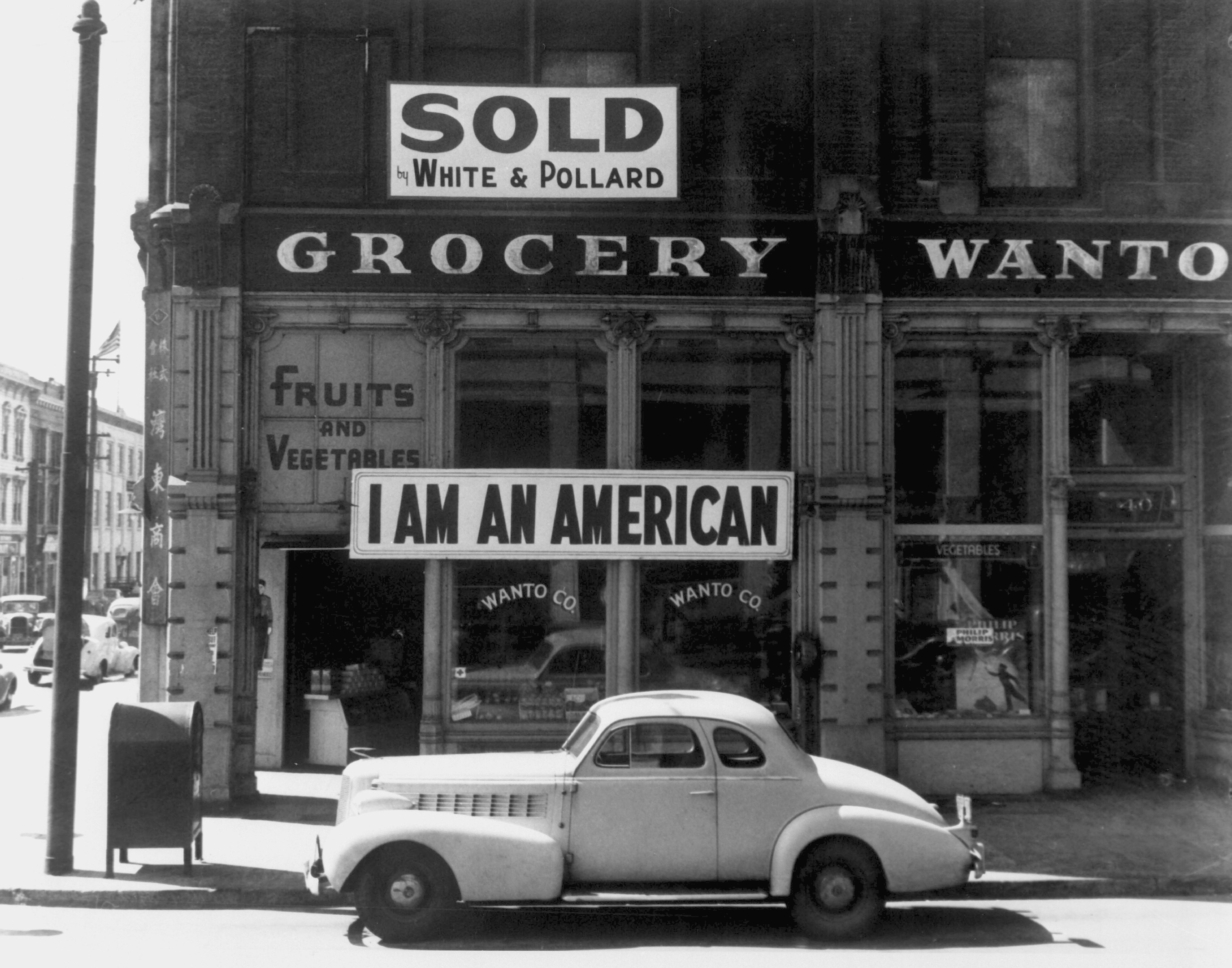
Tatsuro Masuda, a Japanese American, unfurled this banner at "Wanto Sho-Kai", 401-403 Eighth Street at Franklin Street in Oakland, California, the day after the Pearl Harbor attack. Dorothea Lange took this photograph 13 March 1942.

A survey of the Office of Facts and Figures on February 4 (two weeks prior to the president's order) reported that a majority of Americans expressed satisfaction with existing governmental controls on Japanese Americans. Moreover, in his autobiography in 1962, Biddle, who opposed incarceration, downplayed the influence of public opinion in prompting the president's decision. He even considered it doubtful "whether, political and special group press aside, public opinion even on the West Coast supported evacuation." Support for harsher measures toward Japanese Americans increased over time, however, in part since Roosevelt did little to use his office to calm attitudes. According to a March 1942 poll conducted by the American Institute of Public Opinion, after incarceration was becoming inevitable, 93% of Americans supported the relocation of Japanese non-citizens from the Pacific Coast while only 1% opposed it. According to the same poll, 59% supported the relocation of Japanese people who were born in the country and were United States citizens, while 25% opposed it.

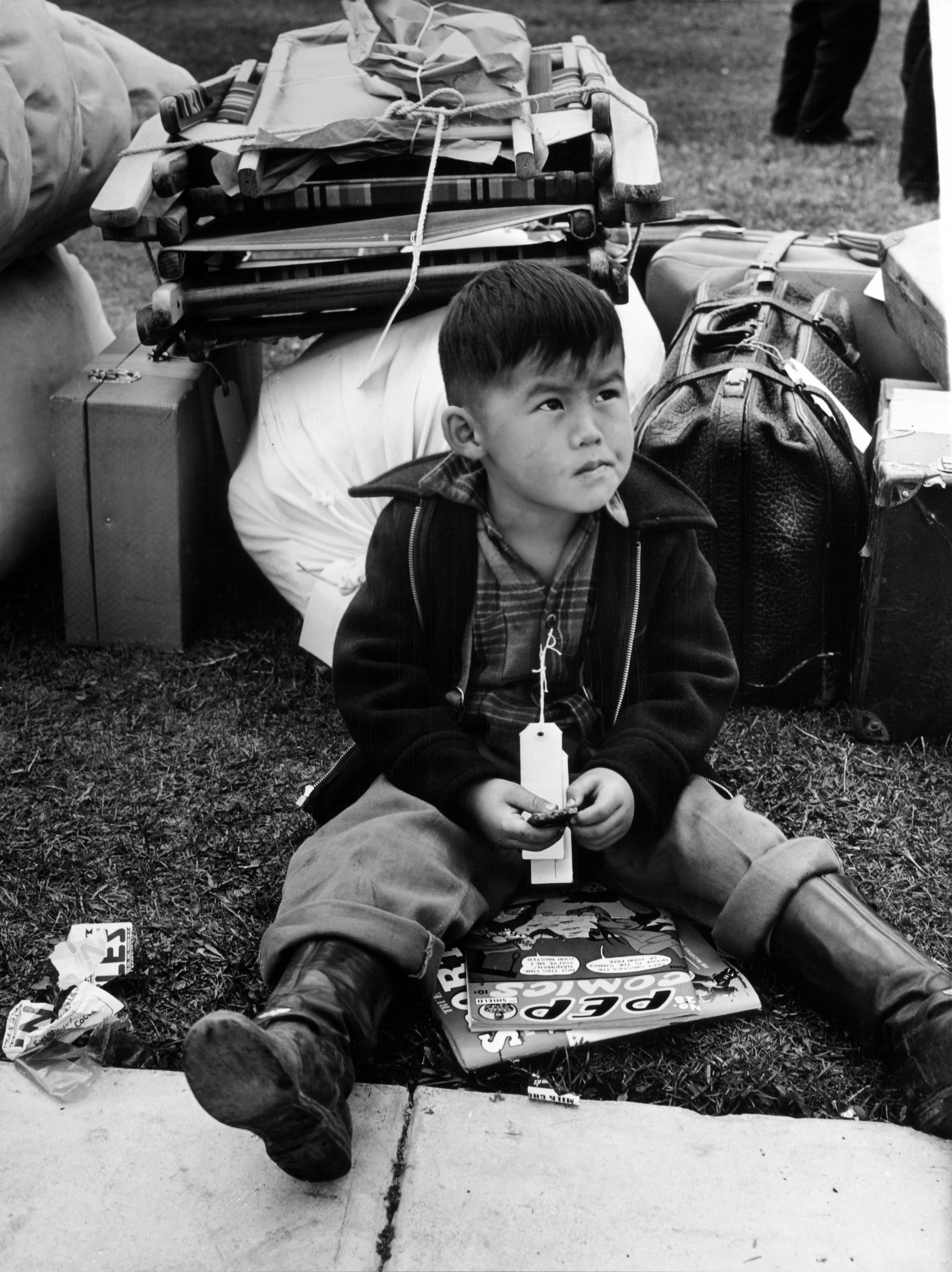
A child is "Tagged for evacuation", Salinas, California, May 1942. Photo by Russell Lee.

The incarceration and imprisonment measures taken against Japanese Americans after the attack falls into a broader trend of anti-Japanese attitudes on the West Coast of the United States. To this end, preparations had already been made in the collection of names of Japanese American individuals and organizations, along with other foreign nationals such as Germans and Italians, that were to be removed from society in the event of a conflict. The December 7th attack on Pearl Harbor, bringing the United States into the Second World War, enabled the implementation of the dedicated government policy of incarceration, with the action and methodology having been extensively prepared before war broke out despite multiple reports that had been consulted by Roosevelt expressing the notion that Japanese Americans posed little threat.

Additionally, the forced removal and incarceration of Japanese Americans during World War II led to severe economic consequences. Numerous Japanese Americans had to leave their homes, businesses, and possessions since they were relocated to the internment camps. This also led to the collapse of many family-owned businesses, real estate, and their savings since they had been escorted to the camps. "Camp residents lost some $400 million in property during their incarceration. Congress provided $38 million in reparations in 1948 and, forty years later, paid an additional $20,000 to each surviving individual who had been detained in the camps". Additionally, Japanese American farmers suffered greatly due to their forced relocation. In 1942, the managing secretary of the Western Growers Protective Association reported that the removal of Japanese Americans led to significant profits for growers and shippers.

==== Niʻihau incident ====
Although the impact on US authorities is controversial, the Niʻihau incident immediately followed the attack on Pearl Harbor, when Ishimatsu Shintani, an Issei, and Yoshio Harada, a Nisei, and his Issei wife Irene Harada on the island of Niʻihau violently freed a downed and captured Japanese naval airman, attacking their fellow Niʻihau islanders in the process.

==== Roberts Commission ====
Several concerns over the loyalty of ethnic Japanese seemed to stem from racial prejudice rather than any evidence of malfeasance. The Roberts Commission report, which investigated the Pearl Harbor attack, was released on January 25 and accused persons of Japanese ancestry of espionage leading up to the attack. Although the report's key finding was that General Walter Short and Admiral Husband E. Kimmel had been derelict in their duties during the attack on Pearl Harbor, one passage made vague reference to "Japanese consular agents and other... persons having no open relations with the Japanese foreign service" transmitting information to Japan. It was unlikely that these "spies" were Japanese American, as Japanese intelligence agents were distrustful of their American counterparts and preferred to recruit "white persons and Negroes." However, despite the fact that the report made no mention of Americans of Japanese ancestry, national and West Coast media nevertheless used the report to vilify Japanese Americans and inflame public opinion against them.

==== Questioning the loyalty of Japanese Americans ====
Major Karl Bendetsen and Lieutenant General John L. DeWitt, head of the Western Defense Command, questioned the loyalty of Japanese Americans. DeWitt said:

The fact that nothing has happened so far is more or less . . . ominous, in that I feel that in view of the fact that we have had no sporadic attempts at sabotage that there is a control being exercised and when we have it it will be on a mass basis.

He further stated in a conversation with California's governor, Culbert L. Olson:

There's a tremendous volume of public opinion now developing against the Japanese of all classes, that is aliens and non-aliens, to get them off the land, and in Southern California around Los Angeles—in that area too—they want and they are bringing pressure on the government to move all the Japanese out. As a matter of fact, it's not being instigated or developed by people who are not thinking but by the best people of California. Since the publication of the Roberts Report they feel that they are living in the midst of a lot of enemies. They don't trust the Japanese, none of them.

==== "A Jap's a Jap" ====
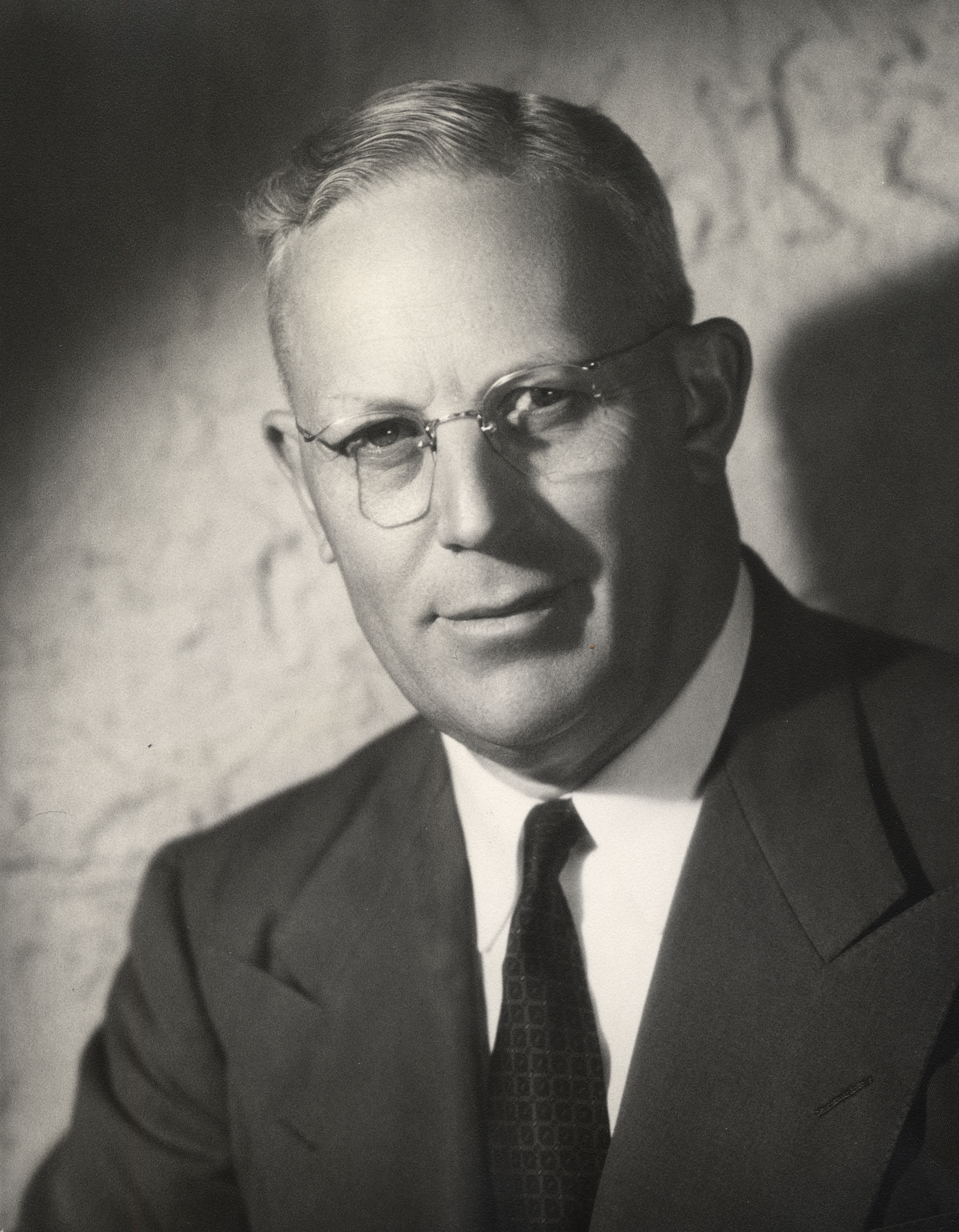
Earl Warren, California Attorney General and future Chief Justice of the U.S. Supreme Court, was one of the main architects behind Japanese-American internment

DeWitt, who administered the incarceration program, repeatedly told newspapers that "A Jap's a Jap" and testified to Congress:

I don't want any of them [persons of Japanese ancestry] here. They are a dangerous element. There is no way to determine their loyalty... It makes no difference whether he is an American citizen, he is still a Japanese. American citizenship does not necessarily determine loyalty... But we must worry about the Japanese all the time until he is wiped off the map.

DeWitt also sought approval to conduct search and seizure operations which were aimed at preventing alien Japanese from making radio transmissions to Japanese ships. The Justice Department declined, stating that there was no probable cause to support DeWitt's assertion, as the FBI concluded that there was no security threat. On January 2, the Joint Immigration Committee of the California Legislature sent a manifesto to California newspapers which attacked "the ethnic Japanese," who it alleged were "totally unassimilable." This manifesto further argued that all people of Japanese heritage were loyal subjects of the Emperor of Japan; the manifesto contended that Japanese language schools were bastions of racism which advanced doctrines of Japanese racial superiority.

The manifesto was backed by the Native Sons and Daughters of the Golden West and the California Department of the American Legion, which in January demanded that all Japanese with dual citizenship be placed in concentration camps. By February, Earl Warren, the Attorney General of California (and a future Chief Justice of the United States), had begun his efforts to persuade the federal government to remove all people of Japanese ethnicity from the West Coast.

Those who were as little as 1/16 Japanese were placed in incarceration camps. Bendetsen, promoted to colonel, said in 1942, "I am determined that if they have one drop of Japanese blood in them, they must go to camp."

==== Presidential Proclamations ====
Upon the bombing of Pearl Harbor and pursuant to the Alien Enemies Act, Presidential Proclamations 2525, 2526 and 2527 were issued designating Japanese, German and Italian nationals as enemy aliens. Information gathered by US officials over the previous decade was used to locate and incarcerate thousands of Japanese American community leaders in the days immediately following Pearl Harbor (see section elsewhere in this article "Other concentration camps"). In Hawaii, under the auspices of martial law, both "enemy aliens" and citizens of Japanese and "German" descent were arrested and interned (incarcerated if they were a US citizen).

Presidential Proclamation 2537 (codified at 7 Fed. Reg. 329) was issued on January 14, 1942, requiring "alien enemies" to obtain a certificate of identification and carry it "at all times". Enemy aliens were not allowed to enter restricted areas. Violators of these regulations were subject to "arrest, detention and incarceration for the duration of the war."

On February 13, the Pacific Coast Congressional subcommittee on aliens and sabotage recommended to the President immediate evacuation of "all persons of Japanese lineage and all others, aliens and citizens alike" who were thought to be dangerous from "strategic areas," further specifying that these included the entire "strategic area" of California, Oregon, Washington, and Alaska. On February 16 the President tasked Secretary of War Henry L. Stimson with replying. A conference on February 17 of Secretary Stimson with assistant secretary John J. McCloy, Provost Marshal General Allen W. Gullion, Deputy chief of Army Ground Forces Mark W. Clark, and Colonel Bendetsen decided that General DeWitt should be directed to commence evacuations "to the extent he deemed necessary" to protect vital installations. Throughout the war, interned Japanese Americans protested against their treatment and insisted that they be recognized as loyal Americans. Many sought to demonstrate their patriotism by trying to enlist in the armed forces. Although early in the war Japanese Americans were barred from military service, by 1943 the army had begun actively recruiting Nisei to join new all-Japanese American units.

== Development ==
=== Executive Order 9066 and related actions ===
Executive Order 9066, signed by Roosevelt on February 19, 1942, authorized military commanders to designate "military areas" at their discretion, "from which any or all persons may be excluded." These "exclusion zones," unlike the "alien enemy" roundups, were applicable to anyone that an authorized military commander might choose, whether citizen or non-citizen. Eventually such zones would include parts of both the East and West Coasts, totaling about 1/3 of the country by area. Unlike the subsequent deportation and incarceration programs that would come to be applied to large numbers of Japanese Americans, detentions and restrictions directly under this Individual Exclusion Program were placed primarily on individuals of German or Italian ancestry, including American citizens. The order allowed regional military commanders to designate "military areas" from which "any or all persons may be excluded." Although the executive order did not mention Japanese Americans, this authority was used to declare that all people of Japanese ancestry were required to leave Alaska and the military exclusion zones from all of California and parts of Oregon, Washington, and Arizona, with the exception of those inmates who were being held in government camps. The detainees were not only people of Japanese ancestry, they also included a relatively small number—though still totaling well over ten thousand—of people of German and Italian ancestry as well as Germans who were expelled from Latin America and deported to the U.S. Approximately 5,000 Japanese Americans relocated outside the exclusion zone before March 1942, while some 5,500 community leaders had been arrested immediately after the Pearl Harbor attack and thus were already in custody.

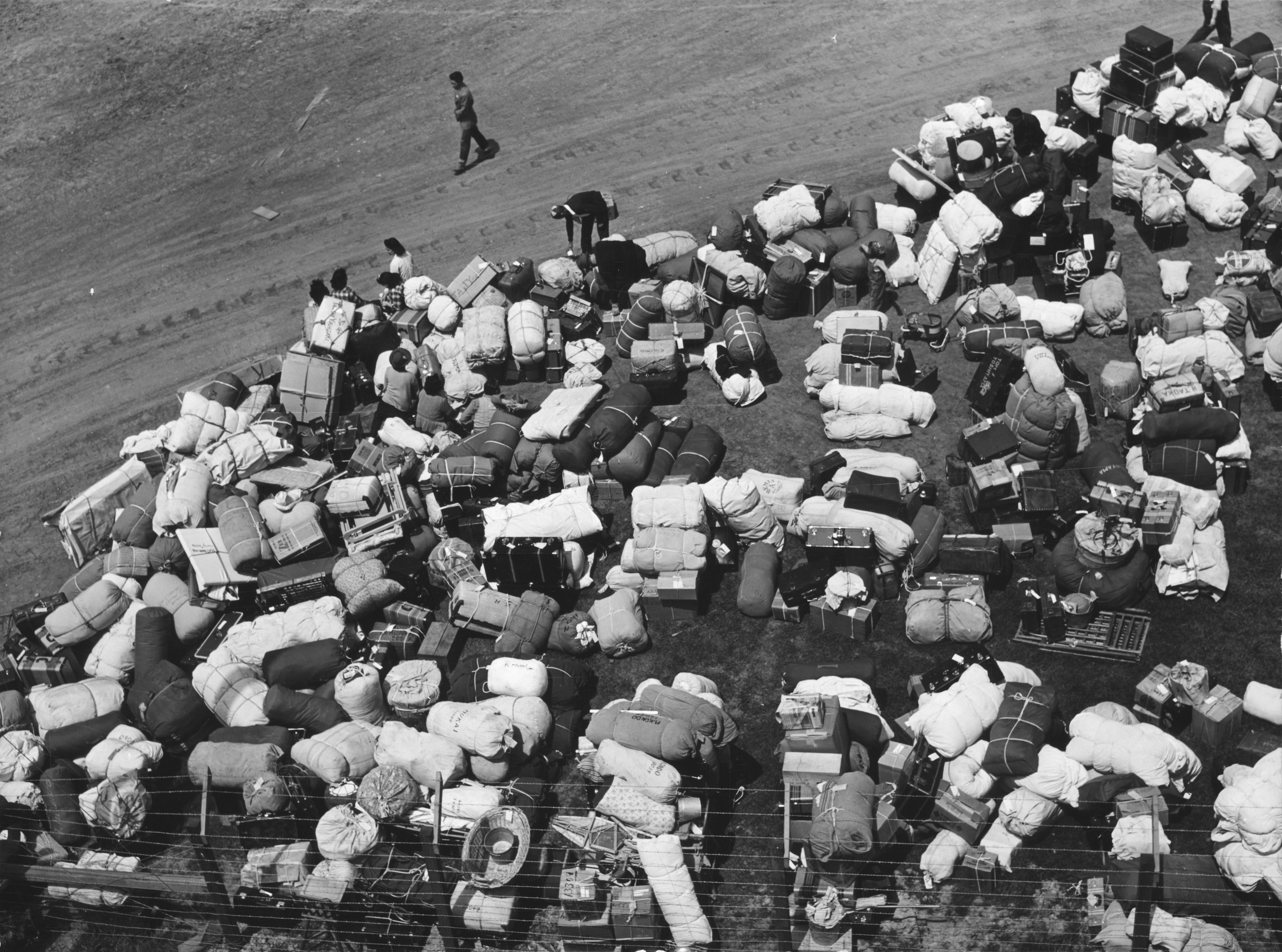
The baggage of Japanese Americans from the West Coast, at a makeshift reception center located at a racetrack

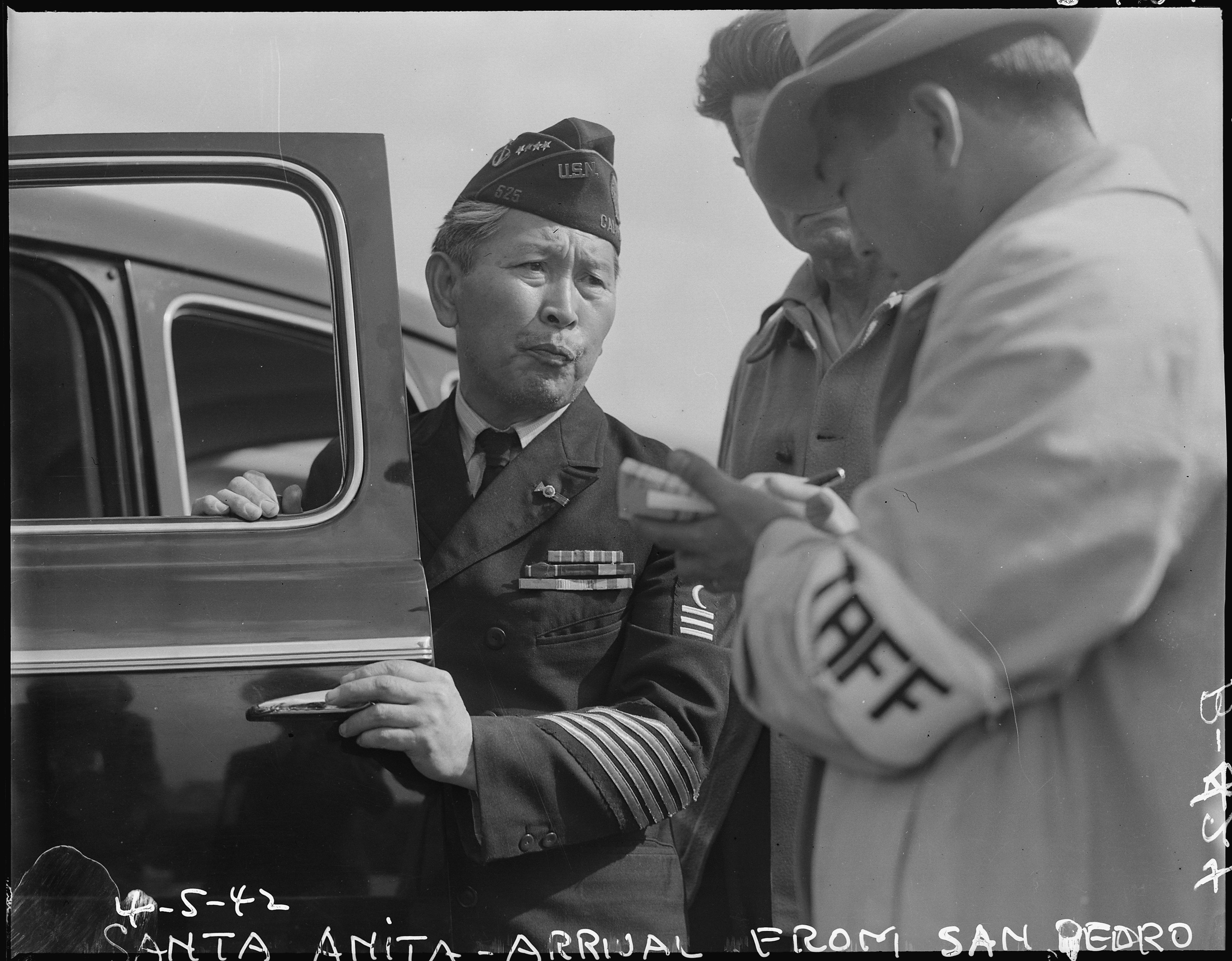
Dressed in uniform marking his service in World War I, a U.S. Navy veteran, Hikotaro Yamada, from Torrance enters Santa Anita Assembly Center (April 1942)

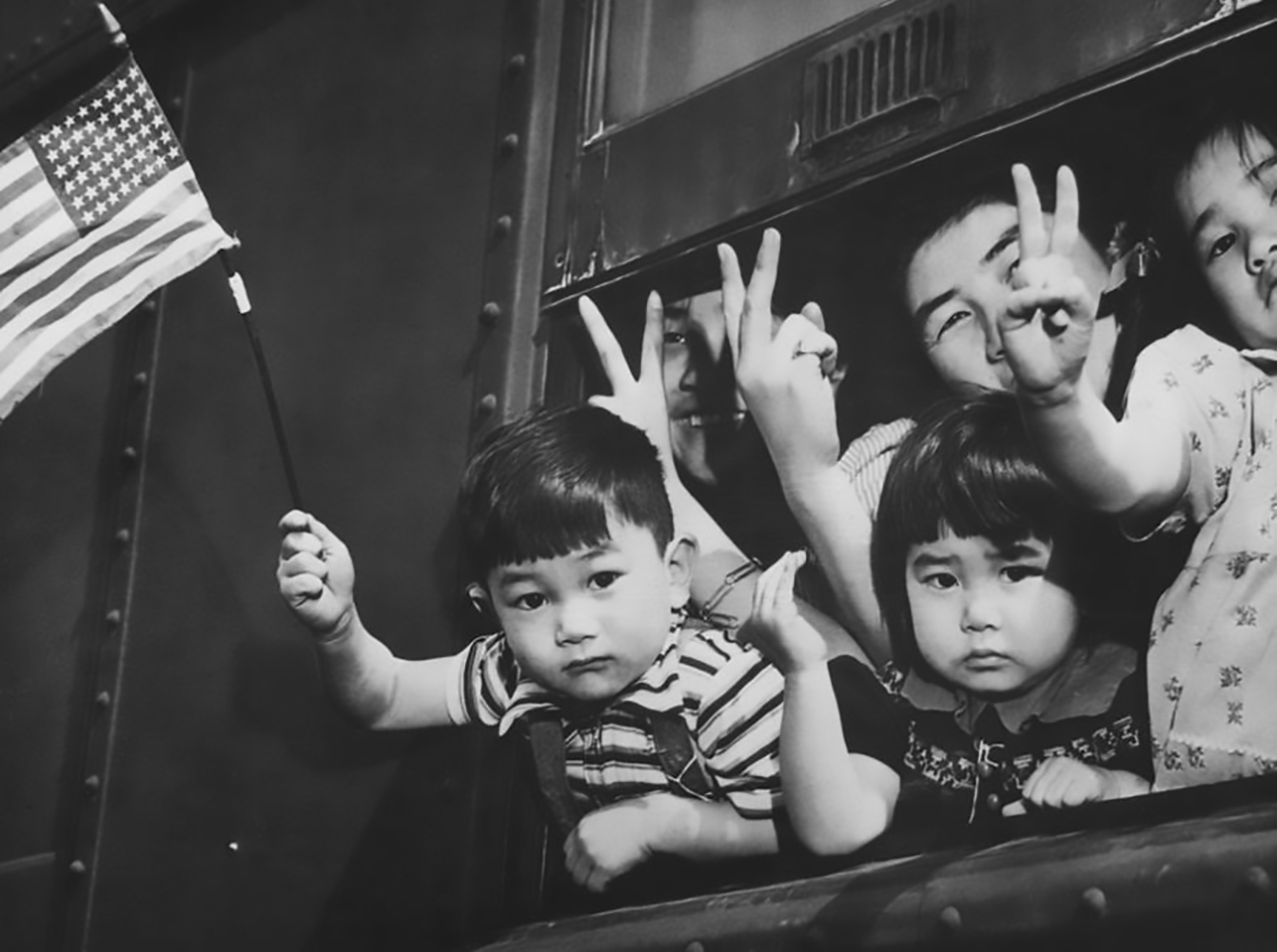
Children wave from the window of a special train as it leaves Seattle with Bainbridge Island internees, March 30, 1942

On March 2, 1942, General John DeWitt, commanding general of the Western Defense Command, publicly announced the creation of two military restricted zones. Military Area No. 1 consisted of the southern half of Arizona and the western half of California, Oregon, and Washington, as well as all of California south of Los Angeles. Military Area No. 2 covered the rest of those states. DeWitt's proclamation informed Japanese Americans they would be required to leave Military Area 1, but stated that they could remain in the second restricted zone. Removal from Military Area No. 1 initially occurred through "voluntary evacuation." Japanese Americans were free to go anywhere outside of the exclusion zone or inside Area 2, with arrangements and costs of relocation to be borne by the individuals. The policy was short-lived; DeWitt issued another proclamation on March 27 that prohibited Japanese Americans from leaving Area 1. A night-time curfew, also initiated on March 27, 1942, placed further restrictions on the movements and daily lives of Japanese Americans.

Included in the forced removal was Alaska, which, like Hawaii, was an incorporated U.S. territory located in the northwest extremity of the continental United States. Unlike the contiguous West Coast, Alaska was not subject to any exclusion zones due to its small Japanese population. Nevertheless, the Western Defense Command announced in April 1942 that all Japanese people and Americans of Japanese ancestry were to leave the territory for incarceration camps inland. By the end of the month, over 200 Japanese residents regardless of citizenship were exiled from Alaska, most of them ended up at the Minidoka War Relocation Center in Southern Idaho.

Eviction from the West Coast began on March 24, 1942, with Civilian Exclusion Order No. 1, which gave the 227 Japanese American residents of Bainbridge Island, Washington six days to prepare for their "evacuation" directly to Manzanar. Colorado governor Ralph Lawrence Carr was the only elected official to publicly denounce the incarceration of American citizens (an act that cost his reelection, but gained him the gratitude of the Japanese American community, such that a statue of him was erected in the Denver Japantown's Sakura Square). A total of 108 exclusion orders issued by the Western Defense Command over the next five months completed the removal of Japanese Americans from the West Coast in August 1942.

In addition to imprisoning those of Japanese descent in the US, the US also interned people of Japanese (and German and Italian) descent deported from Latin America. Thirteen Latin American countries—Bolivia, Colombia, Costa Rica, Dominican Republic, Ecuador, El Salvador, Guatemala, Haiti, Honduras, Mexico, Nicaragua, Panama, and Peru—cooperated with the US by apprehending, detaining and deporting to the US 2,264 Japanese Latin American citizens and permanent residents of Japanese ancestry.

== Support and opposition ==
=== Non-military advocates of exclusion, removal, and detention ===
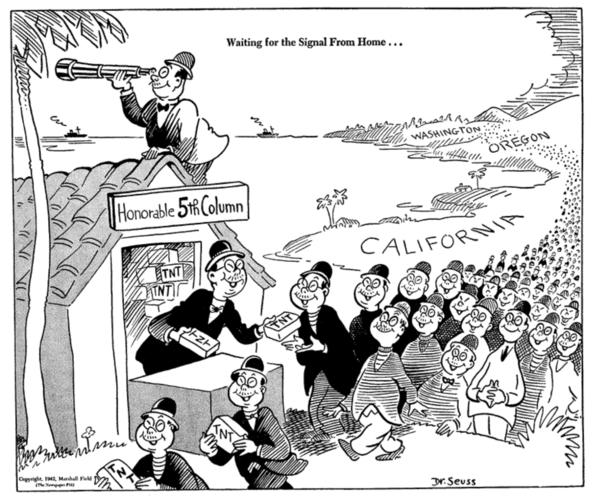
1942 editorial propaganda cartoon in the New York newspaper PM by Dr. Seuss depicting Japanese Americans in California, Oregon, and Washington—states with the largest population of Japanese Americans—as prepared to conduct sabotage against the U.S.

The deportation and incarceration of Japanese Americans was popular among many white farmers who resented the Japanese American farmers. "White American farmers admitted that their self-interest required the removal of the Japanese." These individuals saw incarceration as a convenient means of uprooting their Japanese American competitors. Austin E. Anson, managing secretary of the Salinas Vegetable Grower-Shipper Association, told The Saturday Evening Post in 1942:

We're charged with wanting to get rid of the Japs for selfish reasons. We do. It's a question of whether the White man lives on the Pacific Coast or the brown men. They came into this valley to work, and they stayed to take over... If all the Japs were removed tomorrow, we'd never miss them in two weeks because the White farmers can take over and produce everything the Jap grows. And we do not want them back when the war ends, either.

The leadership of the Japanese American Citizens League did not question the constitutionality of the exclusion of Japanese Americans from the West Coast. Instead, arguing it would better serve the community to follow government orders without protest, the organization advised the approximately 120,000 affected to go peacefully.

The Roberts Commission Report, prepared at President Franklin D. Roosevelt's request, has been cited as an example of the fear and prejudice informing the thinking behind the incarceration program. The Report sought to link Japanese Americans with espionage activity, and to associate them with the bombing of Pearl Harbor. Columnist Henry McLemore, who wrote for the Hearst newspapers, reflected the growing public sentiment that was fueled by this report:

I am for the immediate removal of every Japanese on the West Coast to a point deep in the interior. I don't mean a nice part of the interior either. Herd 'em up, pack 'em off, and give 'em the inside room in the badlands... Personally, I hate the Japanese. And that goes for all of them.

Other California newspapers also embraced this view. According to a Los Angeles Times editorial,

A viper is nonetheless a viper wherever the egg is hatched... So, a Japanese American born of Japanese parents, nurtured upon Japanese traditions, living in a transplanted Japanese atmosphere...notwithstanding his nominal brand of accidental citizenship almost inevitably and with the rarest exceptions grows up to be a Japanese, and not an American... Thus, while it might cause injustice to a few to treat them all as potential enemies, I cannot escape the conclusion...that such treatment...should be accorded to each and all of them while we are at war with their race.

U.S. Representative Leland Ford (R-CA) of Los Angeles joined the bandwagon, who demanded that "all Japanese, whether citizens or not, be placed in [inland] concentration camps."

Incarceration of Japanese Americans, who provided critical agricultural labor on the West Coast, created a labor shortage which was exacerbated by the induction of many white American laborers into the Armed Forces. This vacuum precipitated a mass immigration of Mexican workers into the United States to fill these jobs, under the banner of what became known as the Bracero Program. Many Japanese detainees were temporarily released from their camps – for instance, to harvest Western beet crops – to address this wartime labor shortage.

=== Non-military advocates who opposed exclusion, removal, and detention ===
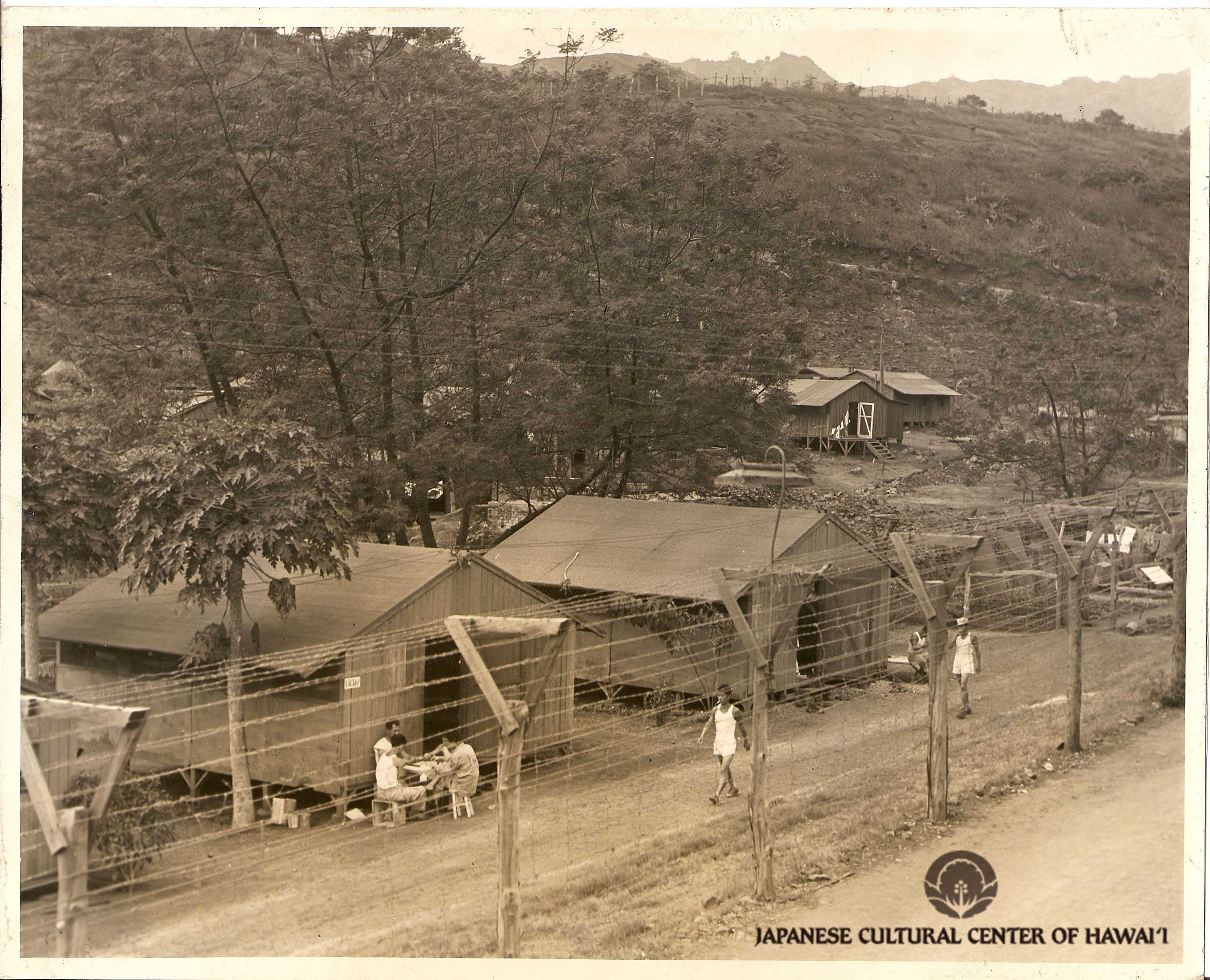
Honouliuli Internment camp, c.1945

Like many white American farmers, the white businessmen of Hawaii had their own motives for determining how Japanese Americans should be dealt with, but they opposed the incarceration of them. Instead, these individuals gained the passage of legislation which enabled them to retain the freedom of the nearly 150,000 Japanese Americans who would have otherwise been sent to concentration camps which were located in Hawaii. As a result, only 1,200 to 1,800 Japanese Americans in Hawaii were incarcerated.

The powerful businessmen of Hawaii concluded that the imprisonment of such a large proportion of the islands' population would adversely affect the economic prosperity of the territory. The Japanese represented "over 90 percent of the carpenters, nearly all of the transportation workers, and a significant portion of the agricultural laborers" on the islands. General Delos Carleton Emmons, the military governor of Hawaii, also argued that Japanese labor was "'absolutely essential' for rebuilding the defenses destroyed at Pearl Harbor." Recognizing the Japanese American community's contribution to the affluence of the Hawaiian economy, General Emmons fought against the incarceration of the Japanese Americans and had the support of most of the businessmen of Hawaii. By comparison, Idaho governor Chase A. Clark, in a Lions Club speech on May 22, 1942, said "Japs live like rats, breed like rats and act like rats. We don't want them ... permanently located in our state."

Initially, Oregon's governor Charles A. Sprague opposed the incarceration, and as a result, he decided not to enforce it in the state and he also discouraged residents from harassing their fellow citizens, the Nisei. He turned against the Japanese by mid-February 1942, days before the executive order was issued, but he later regretted this decision and he attempted to atone for it for the rest of his life.

Even though the incarceration was a generally popular policy in California, it was not universally supported. R.C. Hoiles, publisher of the Orange County Register, argued during the war that the incarceration was unethical and unconstitutional:

It would seem that convicting people of disloyalty to our country without having specific evidence against them is too foreign to our way of life and too close akin to the kind of government we are fighting.... We must realize, as Henry Emerson Fosdick so wisely said, 'Liberty is always dangerous, but it is the safest thing we have.'

Members of some Christian religious groups (such as Presbyterians), particularly those who had formerly sent missionaries to Japan, were among opponents of the incarceration policy. Some Baptist and Methodist churches, among others, also organized relief efforts to the camps, supplying inmates with supplies and information.

=== Statement which justified incarceration as a military necessity ===
==== Niʻihau Incident ====
A Challenge to Democracy (1944), a 20-minute propaganda film produced by the War Relocation Authority

The Niʻihau Incident occurred in December 1941, just after the Imperial Japanese Navy's attack on Pearl Harbor. The Imperial Japanese Navy had designated the Hawaiian island of Niʻihau as an uninhabited island for damaged aircraft to land and await rescue. Three Japanese Americans on Niʻihau assisted a Japanese pilot, Shigenori Nishikaichi, who crashed there. Despite the incident, the Territorial Governor of Hawaii Joseph Poindexter rejected calls for the mass incarceration of the Japanese Americans living there.

==== Cryptography ====
In Magic: The Untold Story of U.S. Intelligence and the Evacuation of Japanese Residents from the West Coast During World War II, David Lowman, a former National Security Agency operative, argues that Magic (the code-name for American code-breaking efforts) intercepts posed "frightening specter of massive espionage nets", thus justifying incarceration. Lowman contended that incarceration served to ensure the secrecy of U.S. code-breaking efforts, because effective prosecution of Japanese Americans might necessitate disclosure of secret information. If U.S. code-breaking technology was revealed in the context of trials of individual spies, the Japanese Imperial Navy would change its codes, thus undermining U.S. strategic wartime advantage.

Some scholars have criticized or dismissed Lowman's reasoning that "disloyalty" among some individual Japanese Americans could legitimize "incarcerating 120,000 people, including infants, the elderly, and the mentally ill". Lowman's reading of the contents of the Magic cables has also been challenged, as some scholars contend that the cables demonstrate that Japanese Americans were not heeding the overtures of Imperial Japan to spy against the United States. According to one critic, Lowman's book has long since been "refuted and discredited".

The controversial conclusions drawn by Lowman were defended by conservative commentator Michelle Malkin in her book In Defense of Internment: The Case for 'Racial Profiling' in World War II and the War on Terror (2004). Malkin's defense of Japanese incarceration was due in part to reaction to what she describes as the "constant alarmism from Bush-bashers who argue that every counter-terror measure in America is tantamount to the internment". She criticized academia's treatment of the subject, and suggested that academics critical of Japanese incarceration had ulterior motives. Her book was widely criticized, particularly with regard to her reading of the Magic cables. Daniel Pipes, also drawing on Lowman, has defended Malkin, and said that Japanese American incarceration was "a good idea" which offers "lessons for today".

==== Black and Jewish community's reactions to the incarceration of Japanese Americans ====
The American public overwhelmingly approved of the Japanese American incarceration measures and as a result, they were rarely opposed, particularly by members of minority groups who felt that they were also being chastised within America. Morton Grodzins writes that "The sentiment against the Japanese was not far removed from (and it was interchangeable with) sentiments against Negroes and Jews."

Occasionally, the NAACP and the NCJW spoke out but neither of those organizations and very few Americans spoke out as strongly as George S. Schuyler, an associate editor of the Pittsburgh Courier, perhaps the leading black newspaper in the U.S., who was increasingly critical of the domestic and foreign policies of the Roosevelt administration. He dismissed accusations that Japanese Americans presented any genuine national security threat. Schuyler warned African Americans that "if the Government can do this to American citizens of Japanese ancestry, then it can do this to American citizens of ANY ancestry...Their fight is our fight."

The shared experience of racial discrimination has led some modern Japanese American leaders to come out in support of HR 40, a bill which calls for reparations to be paid to African-Americans because they are affected by slavery and subsequent discrimination. Cheryl Greenberg adds "Not all Americans endorsed such racism. Two similarly oppressed groups, African Americans and Jewish Americans, had already organized to fight discrimination and bigotry." However, due to the justification of concentration camps by the US government, "few seemed tactile to endorse the evacuation; most did not even discuss it." Greenberg argues that at the time, the incarceration was not discussed because the government's rhetoric hid the motivations for it behind a guise of military necessity, and a fear of seeming "un-American" led to the silencing of most civil rights groups until years into the policy.

=== United States District Court's opinions ===
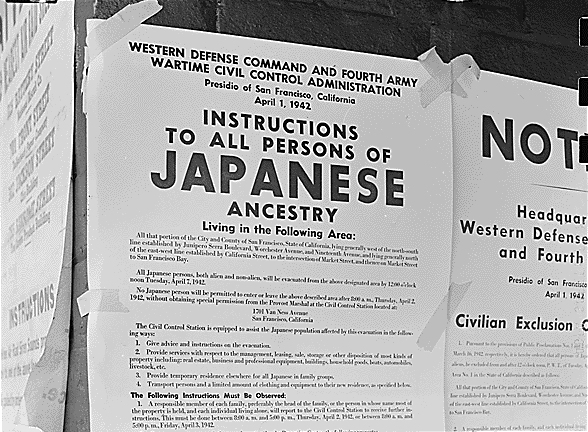
Official notice of exclusion and removal

A letter by DeWitt and Bendetsen expressing racist bias against Japanese Americans was circulated and then hastily redacted in 1943–1944. DeWitt's final report stated that, because of their race, it was impossible to determine the loyalty of Japanese Americans, thus necessitating incarceration. The original version was so offensive – even in the atmosphere of the wartime 1940s – that Bendetsen ordered all copies to be destroyed.

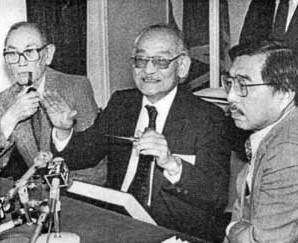
Fred Korematsu (left), Minoru Yasui (middle) and Gordon Hirabayashi (right) in 1986

In 1980, a copy of the original Final Report: Japanese Evacuation from the West Coast – 1942 was found in the National Archives, along with notes which show the numerous differences which exist between the original version and the redacted version. This earlier, racist and inflammatory version, as well as the FBI and Office of Naval Intelligence (ONI) reports, led to the coram nobis retrials which overturned the convictions of Fred Korematsu, Gordon Hirabayashi and Minoru Yasui on all charges related to their refusal to submit to exclusion and incarceration. The courts found that the government had intentionally withheld these reports and other critical evidence, at trials all the way up to the Supreme Court, which proved that there was no military necessity for the exclusion and incarceration of Japanese Americans. In the words of Department of Justice officials writing during the war, the justifications were based on "willful historical inaccuracies and intentional falsehoods".

=== The Ringle Report ===
In May 2011, U.S. Solicitor General Neal Katyal, after a year of investigation, found Charles Fahy had intentionally withheld The Ringle Report drafted by the Office of Naval Intelligence, in order to justify the Roosevelt administration's actions in the cases of Hirabayashi v. United States and Korematsu v. United States. The report would have undermined the administration's position of the military necessity for such action, as it concluded that most Japanese Americans were not a national security threat, and that allegations of communication espionage had been found to be without basis by the FBI and Federal Communications Commission.

== Newspaper editorials ==
Editorials from major newspapers at the time were generally supportive of the incarceration of the Japanese by the United States.

A Los Angeles Times editorial dated February 19, 1942, stated that:

Since Dec. 7 there has existed an obvious menace to the safety of this region in the presence of potential saboteurs and fifth columnists close to oil refineries and storage tanks, airplane factories, Army posts, Navy facilities, ports and communications systems. Under normal sensible procedure not one day would have elapsed after Pearl Harbor before the government had proceeded to round up and send to interior points all Japanese aliens and their immediate descendants for classification and possible incarceration.

This dealt with aliens, and the unassimilated. Going even farther, an Atlanta Constitution editorial dated February 20, 1942, stated that:

The time to stop taking chances with Japanese aliens and Japanese-Americans has come. . . . While Americans have an inate [sic] distaste for stringent measures, every one must realize this is a total war, that there are no Americans running loose in Japan or Germany or Italy and there is absolutely no sense in this country running even the slightest risk of a major disaster from enemy groups within the nation.

A Washington Post editorial dated February 22, 1942, stated that:

There is but one way in which to regard the Presidential order empowering the Army to establish "military areas" from which citizens or aliens may be excluded. That is to accept the order as a necessary accompaniment of total defense.

A Los Angeles Times editorial dated February 28, 1942, stated that:

As to a considerable number of Japanese, no matter where born, there is unfortunately no doubt whatever. They are for Japan; they will aid Japan in every way possible by espionage, sabotage and other activity; and they need to be restrained for the safety of California and the United States. And since there is no sure test for loyalty to the United States, all must be restrained. Those truly loyal will understand and make no objection.

A Los Angeles Times editorial dated December 8, 1942, stated that:

The Japs in these centers in the United States have been afforded the very best of treatment, together with food and living quarters far better than many of them ever knew before, and a minimum amount of restraint. They have been as well fed as the Army and as well as or better housed. . . . The American people can go without milk and butter, but the Japs will be supplied.

A Los Angeles Times editorial dated April 22, 1943, stated that:

As a race, the Japanese have made for themselves a record for conscienceless treachery unsurpassed in history. Whatever small theoretical advantages there might be in releasing those under restraint in this country would be enormously outweighed by the risks involved.

== Facilities ==
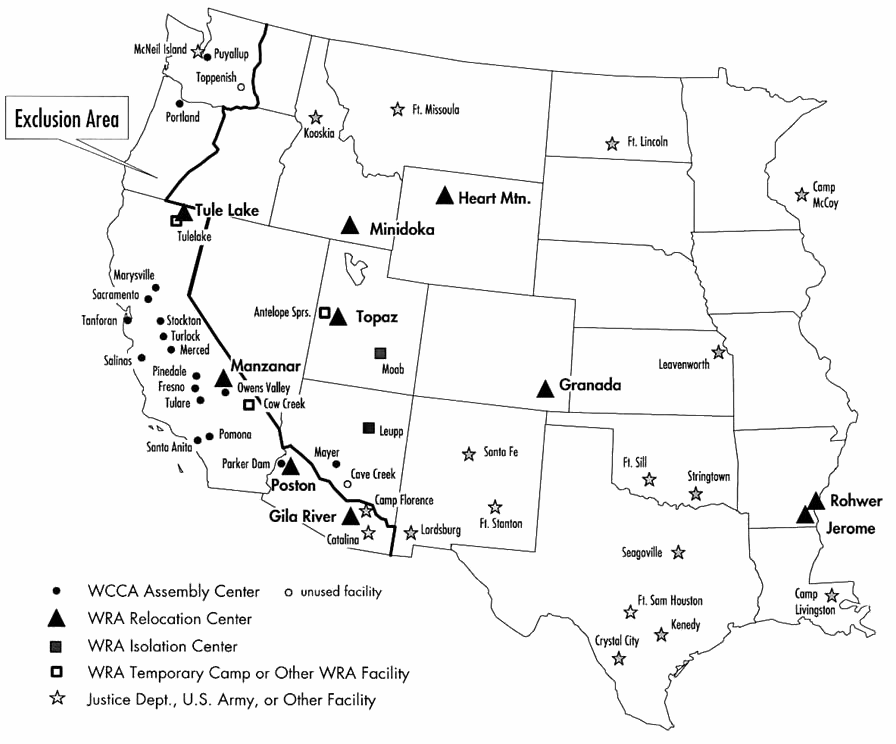
Institutions of the Wartime Civil Control Administration and War Relocation Authority in the Midwestern, Southern and Western U.S.

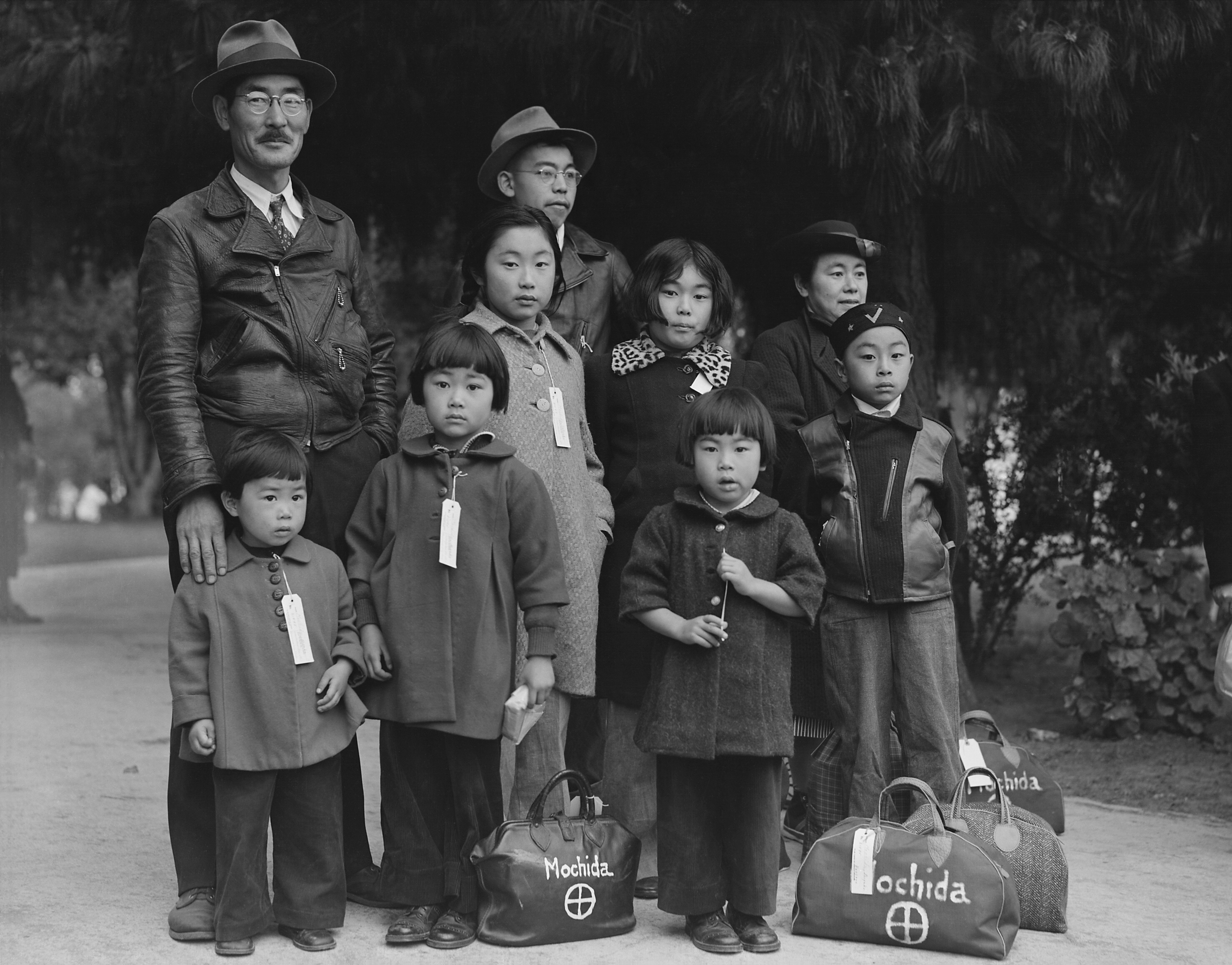
Hayward, California. "Members of the Mochida family awaiting evacuation bus. Identification tags are used to aid in keeping the family unit intact during all phases of evacuation. Mochida operated a nursery and five greenhouses on a two-acre site in Eden Township. He raised snapdragons and sweet peas."

The Works Projects Administration (WPA) played a key role in the construction and staffing of the camps in the initial period. From March to the end of November 1942, that agency spent $4.47 million on removal and incarceration, which was even more than the Army devoted to that purpose during that period. The WPA was instrumental in creating such features of the camps as guard towers and barbed wire fencing.

The government operated several different types of camps holding Japanese Americans. The best known facilities were the military-run Wartime Civil Control Administration (WCCA) Assembly Centers and the civilian-run War Relocation Authority (WRA) Relocation Centers, which are generally (but unofficially) referred to as "internment camps". Many employees of the WRA had earlier worked for the WPA during the initial period of removal and construction. Scholars have urged dropping such euphemisms and refer to them as concentration camps and the people as incarcerated. Another argument for using the label "concentration camps" is that President Roosevelt himself applied that terminology to them, including at a press conference in November 1944.

The Department of Justice (DOJ) operated camps officially called Internment Camps, which were used to detain those suspected of crimes or of "enemy sympathies". The government also operated camps for a number of German Americans and Italian Americans, who sometimes were assigned to share facilities with the Japanese Americans. The WCCA and WRA facilities were the largest and the most public. The WCCA Assembly Centers were temporary facilities that were first set up in horse racing tracks, fairgrounds, and other large public meeting places to assemble and organize inmates before they were transported to WRA Relocation Centers by truck, bus, or train. The WRA Relocation Centers were semi-permanent camps that housed persons removed from the exclusion zone after March 1942, or until they were able to relocate elsewhere in the United States outside the exclusion zone.

=== DOJ and Army incarceration camps ===
Eight U.S. Department of Justice Camps (in Texas, Idaho, North Dakota, New Mexico, and Montana) held Japanese Americans, primarily non-citizens and their families. The camps were run by the Immigration and Naturalization Service, under the umbrella of the DOJ, and guarded by Border Patrol agents rather than military police. The population of these camps included approximately 3,800 of the 5,500 Buddhist and Christian ministers, school instructors, newspaper workers, fishermen, and community leaders who had been accused of fifth column activity and arrested by the FBI after Pearl Harbor. (The remaining 1,700 were released to WRA relocation centers.) Immigrants and nationals of German and Italian ancestry were also held in these facilities, often in the same camps as Japanese Americans. Approximately 7,000 German Americans and 3,000 Italian Americans from Hawaiʻi and the U.S. mainland were interned in DOJ camps, along with 500 German seamen already in custody after being rescued from the SS Columbus in 1939. In addition 2,264 ethnic Japanese, 4,058 ethnic Germans, and 288 ethnic Italians were deported from 19 Latin American countries for a later-abandoned hostage exchange program with Axis countries or confinement in DOJ camps.

Several U.S. Army incarceration camps held Japanese, Italian, and German American men considered "potentially dangerous". Camp Lordsburg, in New Mexico, was the only site built specifically to confine Japanese Americans. In May 1943, the Army was given responsibility for the detention of prisoners of war and all civilian internees were transferred to DOJ camps.

=== WCCA Civilian Assembly Centers ===
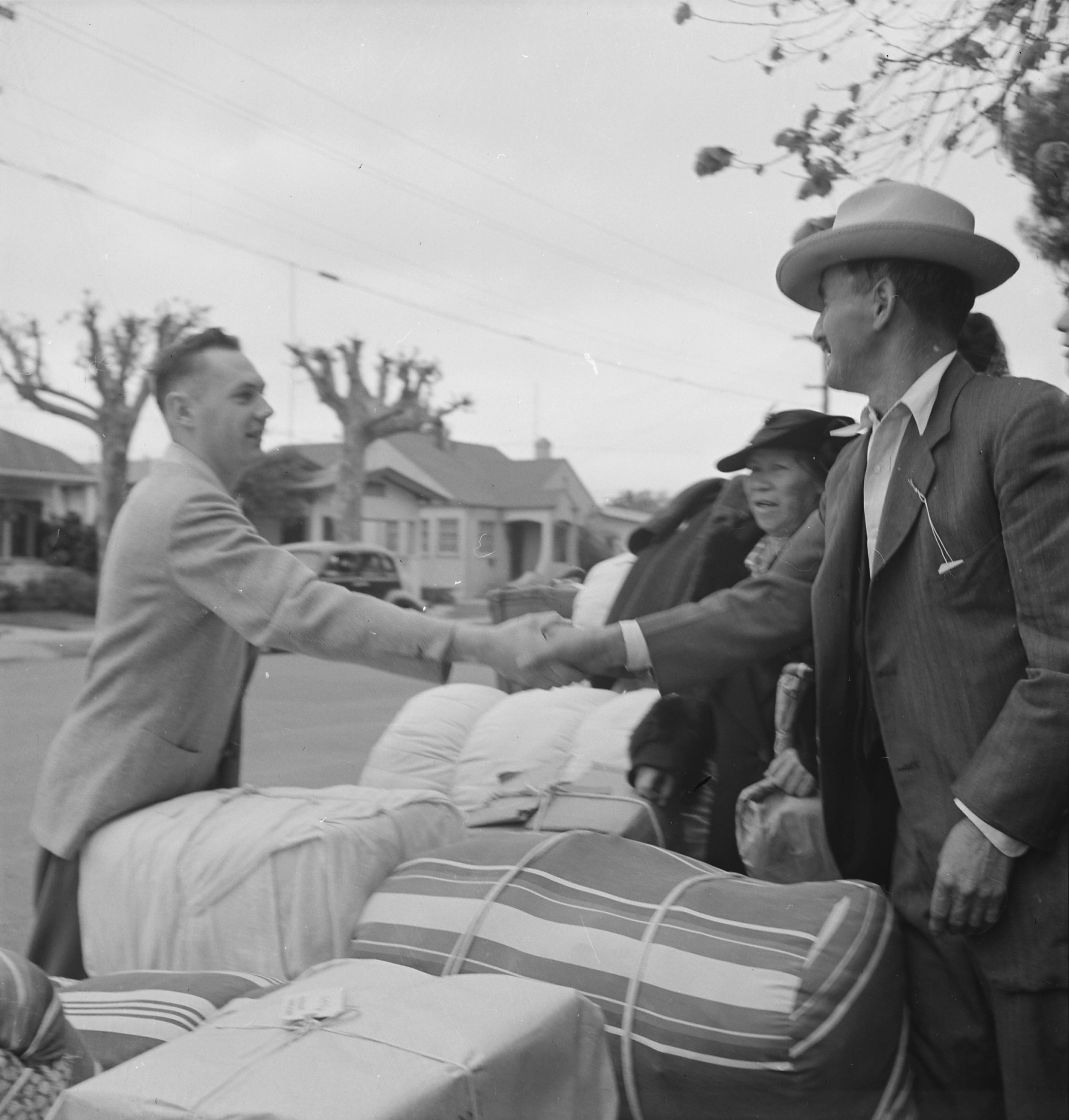
This Dorothea Lange photo (May 8, 1942) was captioned: "Hayward, California. Friends say good-bye as a family of Japanese ancestry await evacuation bus."

Executive Order 9066 authorized the removal of all persons of Japanese ancestry from the West Coast; however, it was signed before there were any facilities completed to house the displaced Japanese Americans. After the voluntary evacuation program failed to result in many families leaving the exclusion zone, the military took charge of the now-mandatory evacuation. On April 9, 1942, the Wartime Civil Control Administration (WCCA) was established by the Western Defense Command to coordinate the forced removal of Japanese Americans to inland concentration camps.

The relocation centers faced opposition from inland communities near the proposed sites who disliked the idea of their new "Jap" neighbors. In addition, government forces were struggling to build what would essentially be self-sufficient towns in very isolated, undeveloped, and harsh regions of the country; they were not prepared to house the influx of over 110,000 inmates. Since Japanese Americans living in the restricted zone were considered too dangerous to conduct their daily business, the military decided it had to house them in temporary centers until the relocation centers were completed.

Under the direction of Colonel Karl Bendetsen, existing facilities had been designated for conversion to WCCA use in March 1942, and the Army Corps of Engineers finished construction on these sites on April 21, 1942. All but four of the 15 confinement sites (12 in California, and one each in Washington, Oregon, and Arizona) had previously been racetracks or fairgrounds. The stables and livestock areas were cleaned out and hastily converted to living quarters for families of up to six, while wood and tar-paper barracks were constructed for additional housing, as well as communal latrines, laundry facilities, and mess halls. A total of 92,193 Japanese Americans were transferred to these temporary detention centers from March to August 1942. (18,026 more had been taken directly to two "reception centers" that were developed as the Manzanar and Poston WRA camps.) The WCCA was dissolved on March 15, 1943, when it became the War Relocation Authority and turned its attentions to the more permanent relocation centers.

=== WRA Relocation Centers ===
WRA Relocation Centers
Name	State	Opened	Peak Pop.
Manzanar	California	March 1942	10,046
Tule Lake	California	May 1942	18,789
Poston	Arizona	May 1942	17,814
Gila River	Arizona	July 1942	13,348
Granada	Colorado	August 1942	7,318
Heart Mountain	Wyoming	August 1942	10,767
Minidoka	Idaho	August 1942	9,397
Topaz	Utah	September 1942	8,130
Rohwer	Arkansas	September 1942	8,475
Jerome	Arkansas	October 1942	8,497

The War Relocation Authority (WRA) was the U.S. civilian agency responsible for the relocation and detention. The WRA was created by President Roosevelt on March 18, 1942, with Executive Order 9102 and it officially ceased to exist on June 30, 1946. Milton S. Eisenhower, then an official of the Department of Agriculture, was chosen to head the WRA. In the 1943 US Government film Japanese Relocation he said, "This picture tells how the mass migration was accomplished. Neither the Army, not the War Relocation Authority relish the idea of taking men, women and children from their homes, their shops and their farms. So, the military and civilian agencies alike, determined to do the job as a democracy should—with real consideration for the people involved." Dillon S. Myer replaced Eisenhower three months later on June 17, 1942. Myer served as Director of the WRA until the centers were closed. Within nine months, the WRA had opened ten facilities in seven states and transferred over 100,000 people from the WCCA facilities.

The WRA camp at Tule Lake was integral to food production in its own camp, as well as other camps. Almost 30 crops were harvested at this site by farmworkers. Despite this, Tule Lake's camp was eventually used as a detention center for people believed to pose a security risk. Tule Lake also served as a "segregation center" for individuals and families who were deemed "disloyal", and for those who were to be deported to Japan.

=== List of camps ===
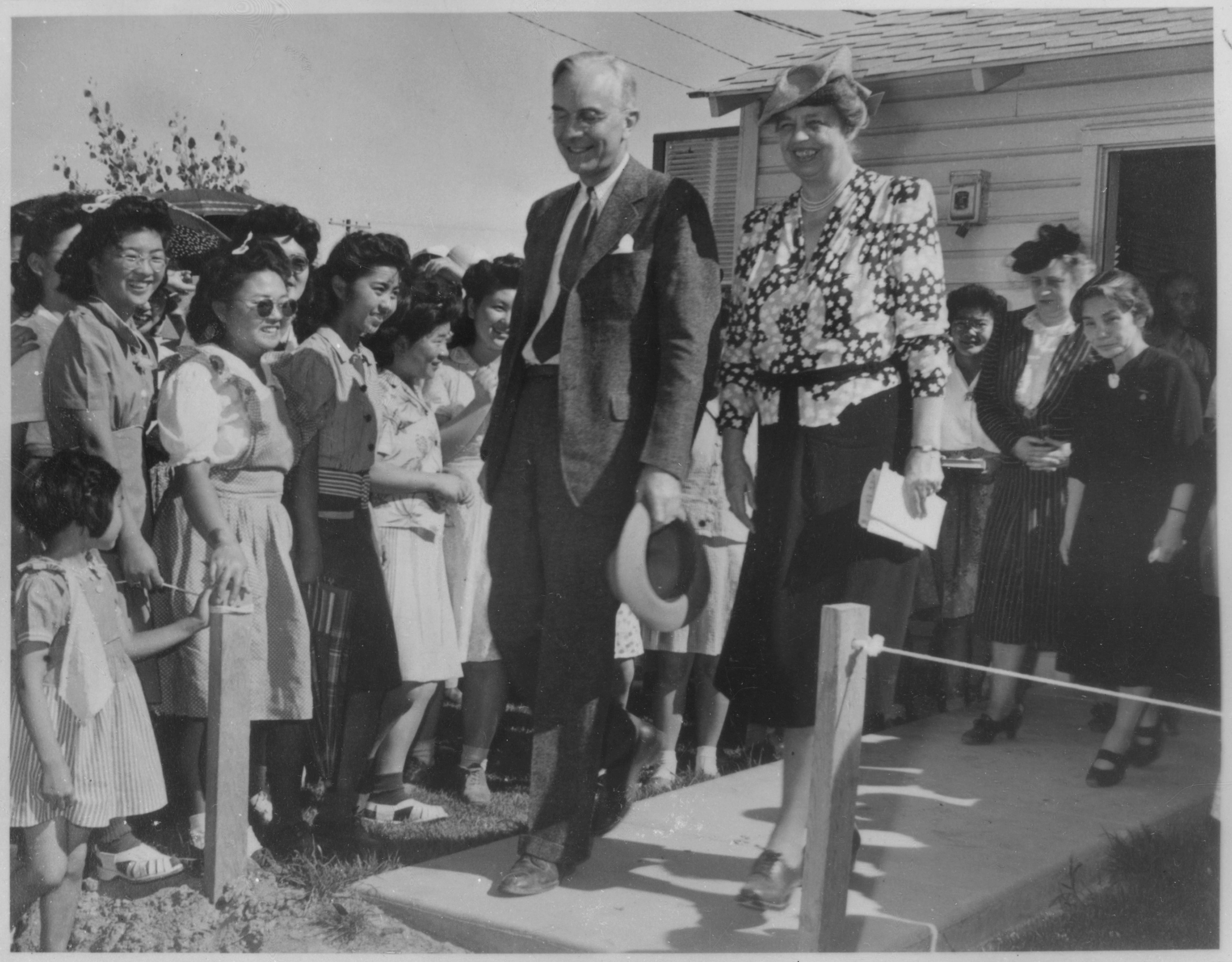
Dillon S. Myer with First Lady Eleanor Roosevelt visiting the Gila River Relocation Center on April 23, 1943

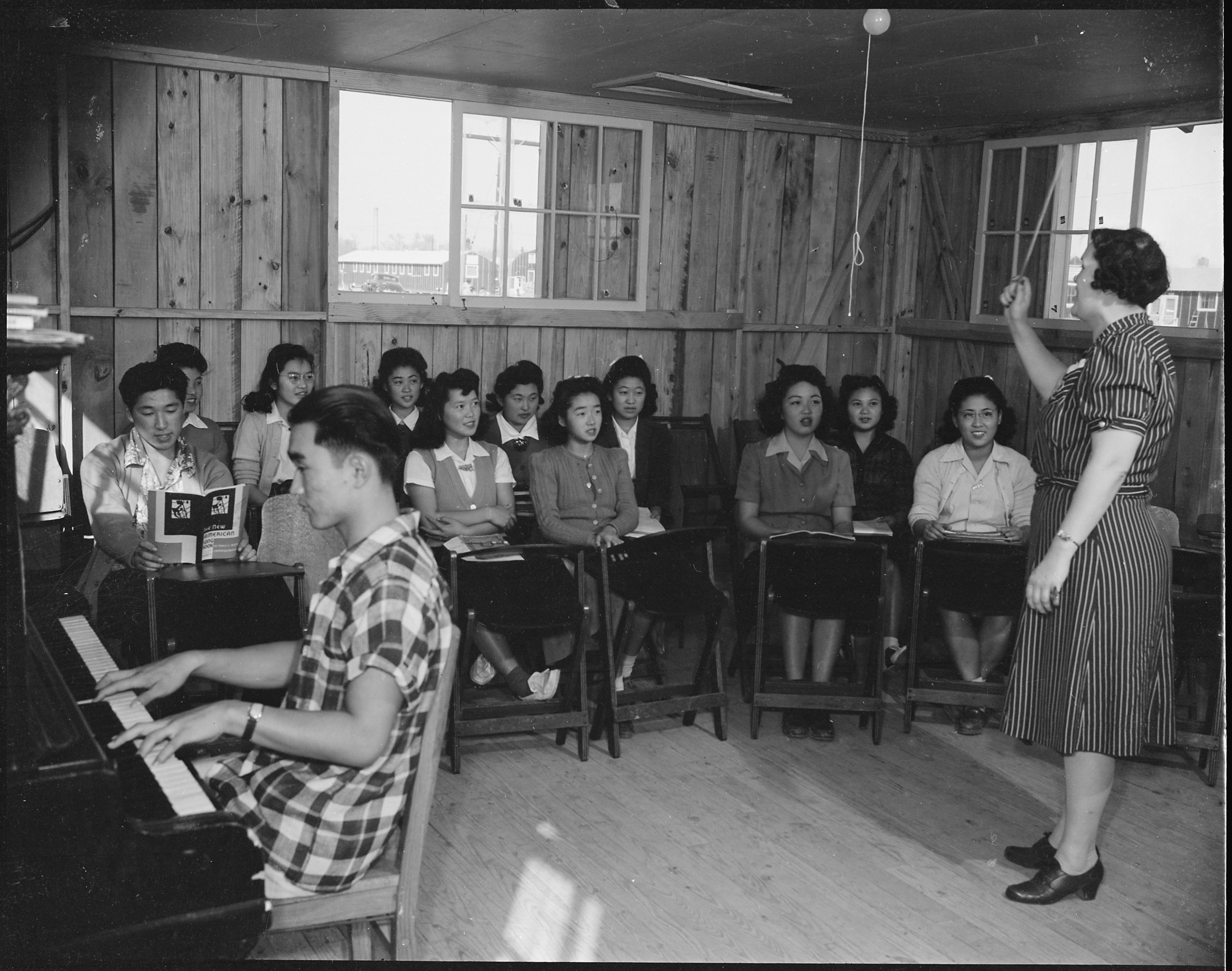
Music class at the Rohwer Relocation Center

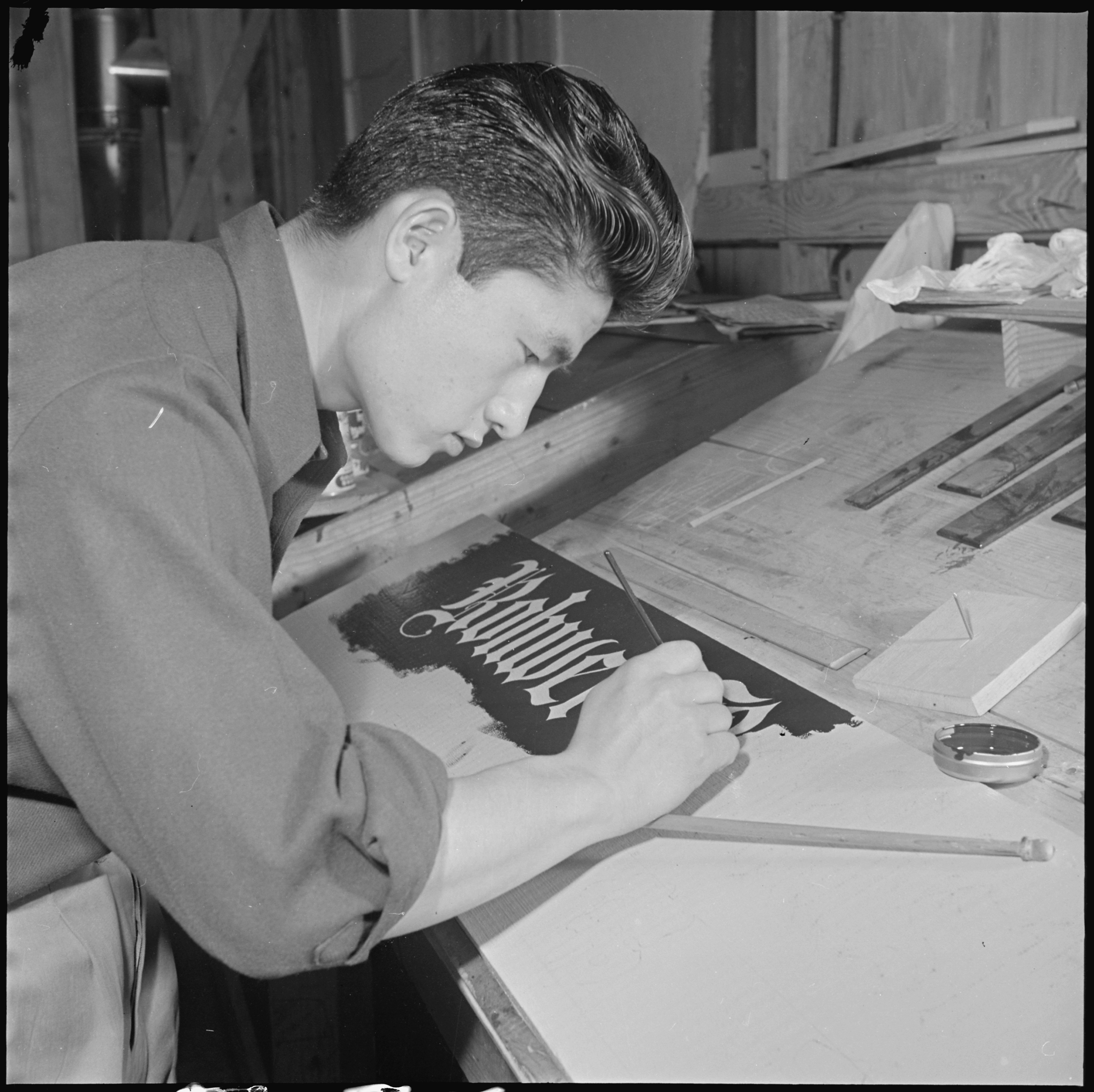
Former California artist Allen Hagio preparing a sign at the Rohwer Relocation Center

There were three types of camps. Civilian Assembly Centers were temporary camps, frequently located at horse tracks, where Japanese Americans were sent after they were removed from their communities. Eventually, most of the Japanese Americans were sent to Relocation Centers, also known as internment camps. Detention camps housed Nikkei who the government considered disruptive as well as Nikkei who the government believed were of special interest. When most of the Assembly Centers closed, they became training camps for US troops.

==== Civilian Assembly Centers ====
- Arcadia, California (Santa Anita Racetrack, stables) (Santa Anita assembly center)
- Fresno, California (Fresno Fairgrounds, racetrack, stables) Fresno Assembly Center
- Marysville / Arboga, California (migrant workers' camp) Arboga Assembly Center
- Mayer, Arizona (Civilian Conservation Corps camp)
- Merced, California (Merced County Fairgrounds – Merced Assembly Center)
- Owens Valley, California (Manzanar – Owens Valley Reception Center)
- Parker Dam, Arizona – (Poston War Relocation Center – Poston assembly center)
- Pinedale, California (Pinedale Assembly Center, warehouses)
- Pomona, California (Los Angeles County Fairgrounds, racetrack, stables) (Pomona assembly center)
- Portland, Oregon (Pacific International Livestock Exposition, including 3,800 housed in the main pavilion building) (Portland Assembly Center)
- Puyallup, Washington (fairgrounds racetrack stables, Informally known as "Camp Harmony")
- Sacramento, California Camp Kohler (Site of present-day Walerga Park) (migrant workers' camp)
- Salinas, California (fairgrounds, racetrack, stables) Salinas Assembly Center
- San Bruno, California (Tanforan racetrack, stables) Tanforan Assembly Center
- Stockton, California (San Joaquin County Fairgrounds, racetrack, stables)
- Tulare, California (fairgrounds, racetrack, stables) Tulare Assembly Center
- Turlock, California (Stanislaus County Fairgrounds – Turlock Assembly Center)

==== Relocation Centers ====
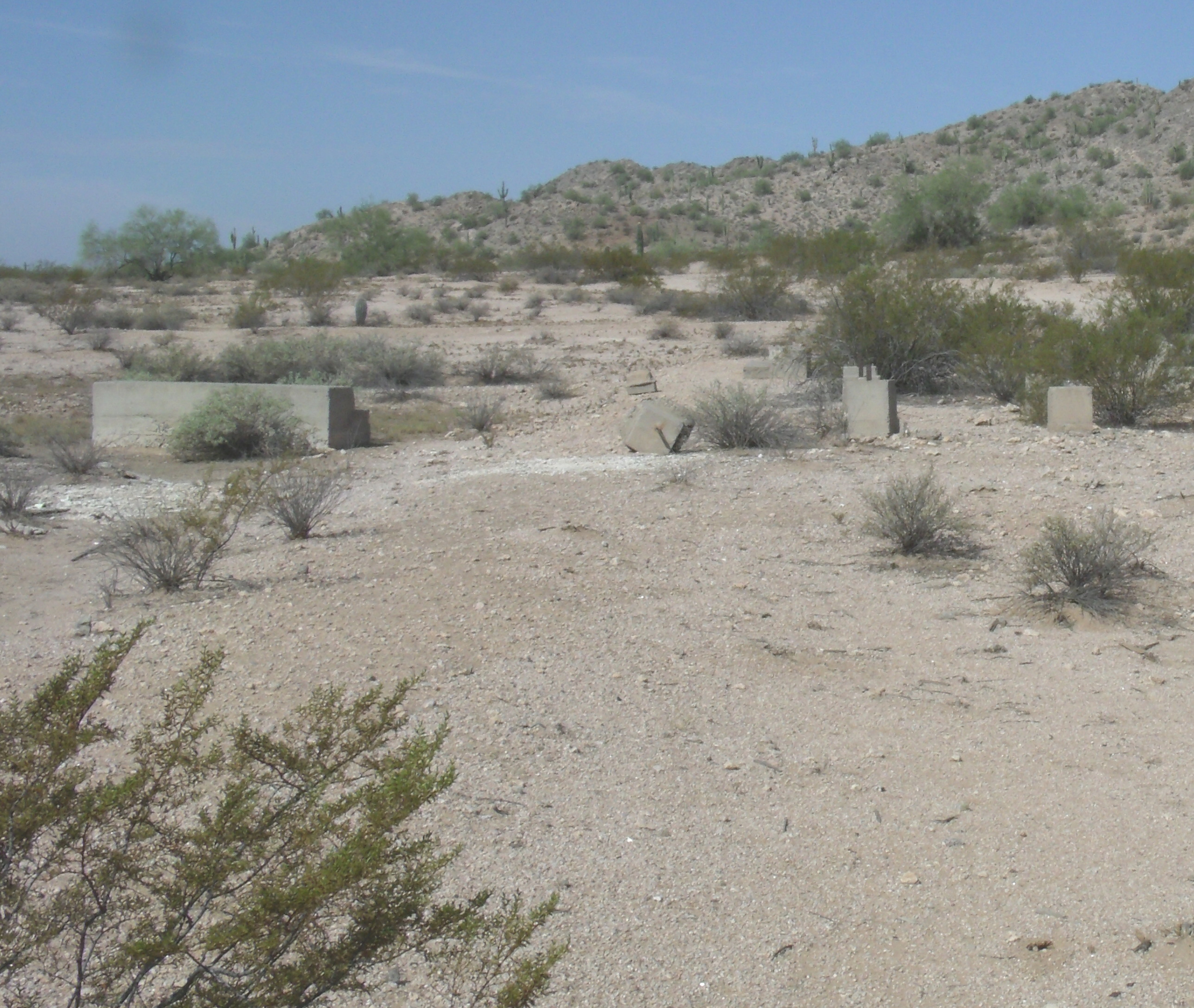
Ruins of the buildings in the Gila River War Relocation Center of Camp Butte

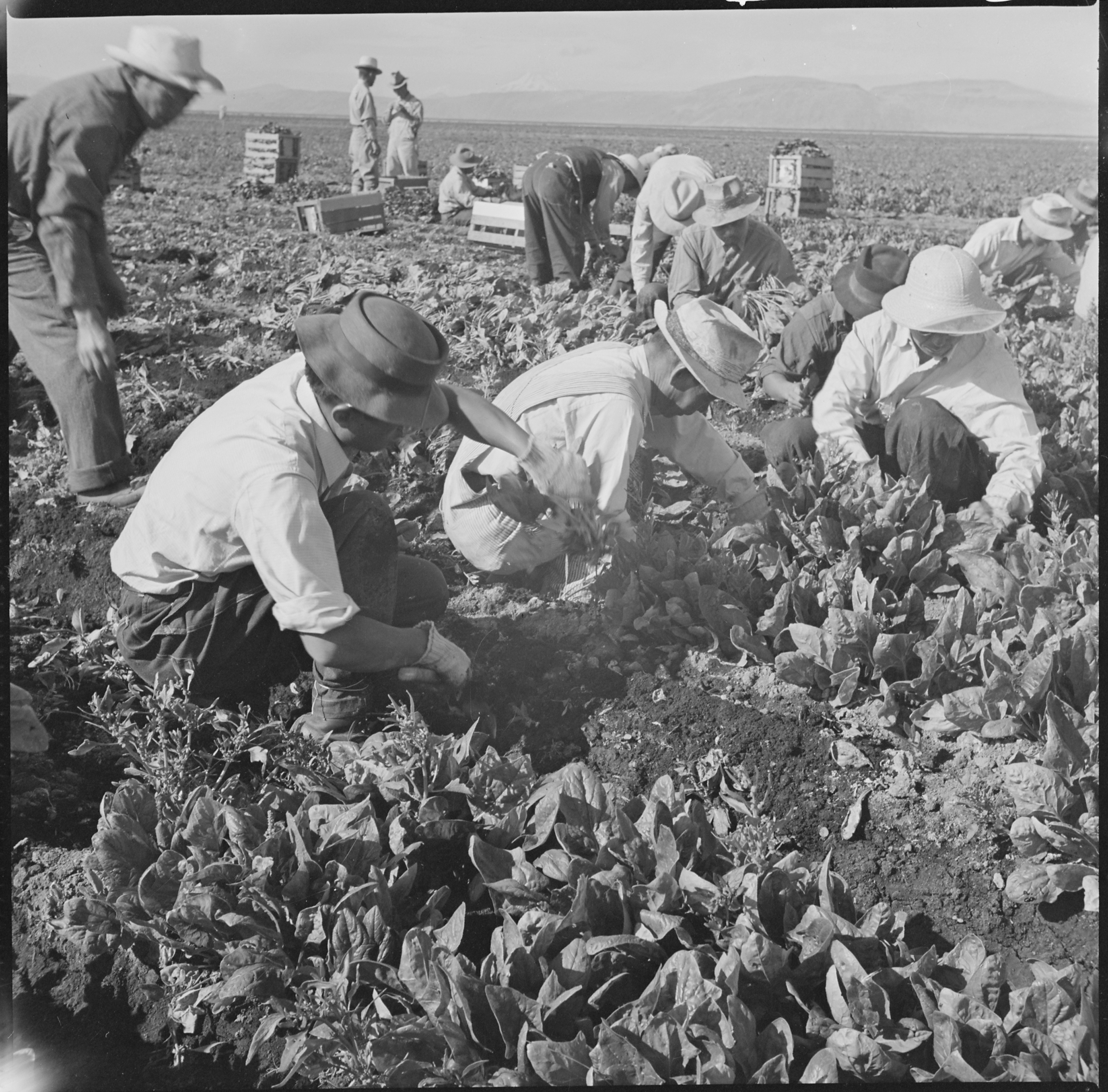
Harvesting spinach, Tule Lake Relocation Center, September 8, 1942

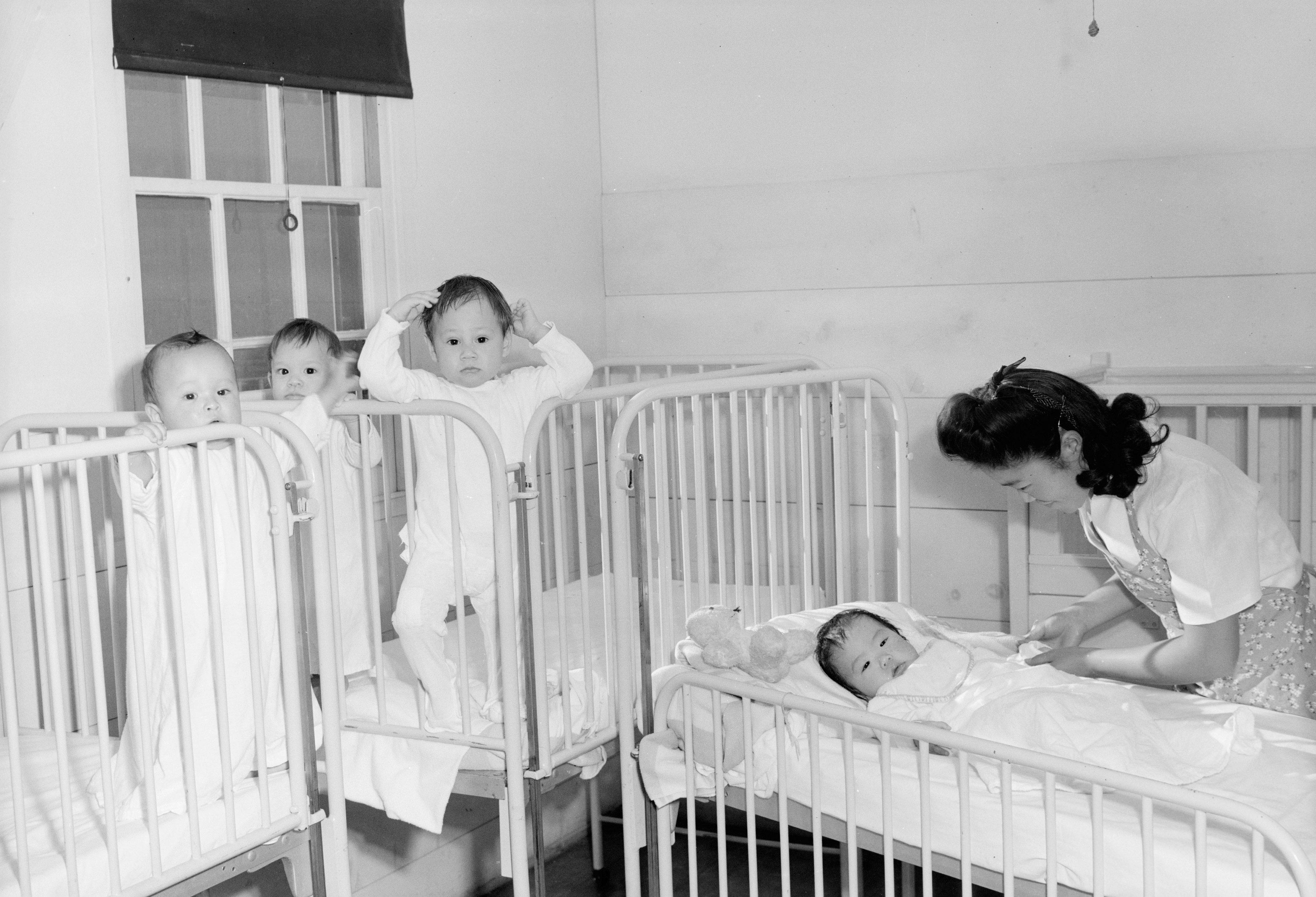
Nurse tending four orphaned babies at the Manzanar Children's Village

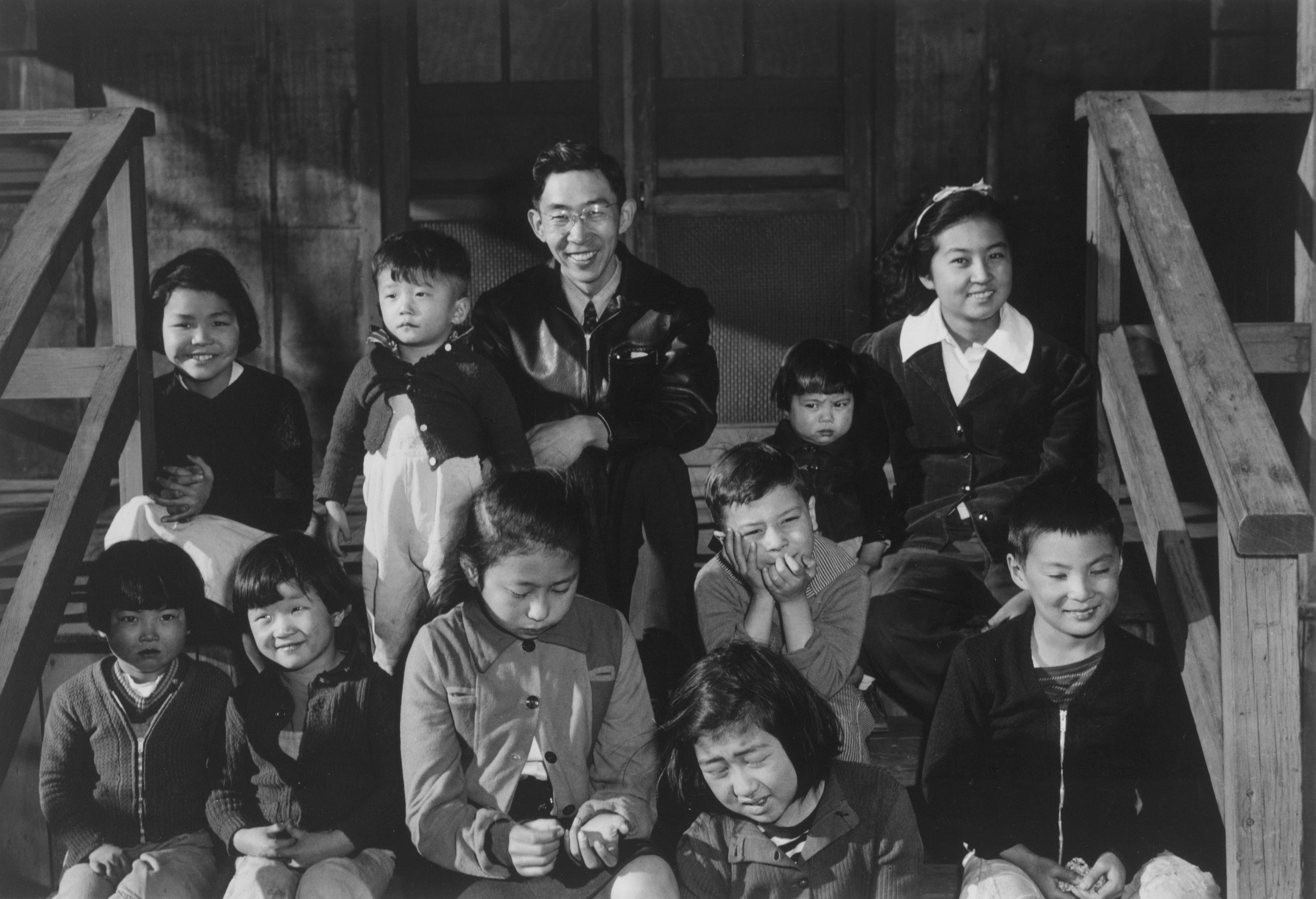
Manzanar Children's Village superintendent Harry Matsumoto with several orphan children

- Gila River War Relocation Center, Arizona
- Granada War Relocation Center, Colorado (AKA Amache)
- Heart Mountain War Relocation Center, Wyoming
- Jerome War Relocation Center, Arkansas
- Manzanar War Relocation Center, California
- Minidoka War Relocation Center, Idaho
- Poston War Relocation Center, Arizona
- Rohwer War Relocation Center, Arkansas
- Topaz War Relocation Center, Utah
- Tule Lake War Relocation Center, California

==== Justice Department detention camps ====
These camps often held German-American and Italian-American detainees in addition to Japanese Americans:

- Crystal City, Texas
- Fort Lincoln Internment Camp
- Fort Missoula, Montana
- Fort Stanton, New Mexico
- Kenedy, Texas
- Kooskia, Idaho
- Santa Fe, New Mexico
- Seagoville, Texas
- Forest Park, Georgia

==== Citizen Isolation Centers ====
The Citizen Isolation Centers were for those considered to be problem inmates.

- Leupp, Arizona
- Dalton Wells Isolation Center
- Fort Stanton, New Mexico (AKA Old Raton Ranch)

Some consider these camps illegal because they were not authorized by Executive Order 9066.

==== Federal Bureau of Prisons ====
Detainees convicted of crimes, usually draft resistance, were sent to these sites, mostly federal prisons:

- Catalina, Arizona
- Fort Leavenworth, Kansas
- McNeil Island, Washington

==== U.S. Army facilities ====
These camps often held German and Italian detainees in addition to Japanese Americans:

- Fort McDowell/Angel Island, California
- Camp Blanding, Florida
- Camp Forrest, Tennessee
- Camp Livingston, Louisiana
- Camp Lordsburg, New Mexico
- Camp McCoy, Wisconsin
- Florence, Arizona
- Fort Bliss, New Mexico and Texas
- Fort Howard, Maryland
- Fort Lewis, Washington
- Fort Meade, Maryland
- Fort Richardson, Alaska
- Fort Sam Houston, Texas
- Fort Sill, Oklahoma
- Griffith Park, California
- Honouliuli Internment Camp, Hawaiʻi
- Sand Island, Hawaiʻi
- Stringtown, Oklahoma

==== Immigration and Naturalization Service facilities ====
These immigration detention stations held the roughly 5,500 men arrested immediately after Pearl Harbor, in addition to several thousand German and Italian detainees, and served as processing centers from which the men were transferred to DOJ or Army camps:

- East Boston Immigration Station
- Ellis Island
- Cincinnati, Ohio
- San Pedro, Los Angeles
- Seattle, Washington
- Sharp Park, California
- Tuna Canyon, Los Angeles

== Exclusion, removal, and detention ==
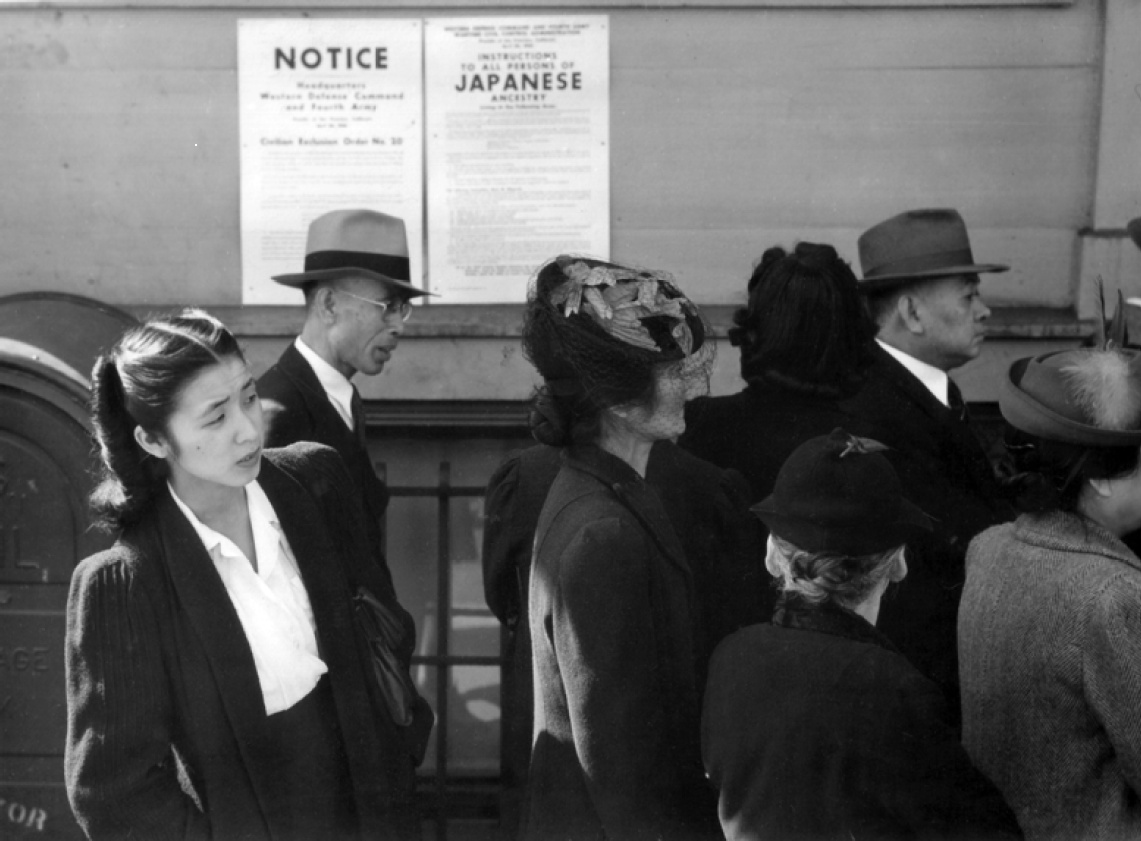
Japanese Americans in front of posters with internment orders

Somewhere between 110,000 and 120,000 people of Japanese ancestry were subject to this mass exclusion program, of whom about 80,000 Nisei (second generation) and Sansei (third generation) were U.S. citizens. The rest were Issei (first generation) who were subject to internment under the Alien Enemies Act; many of these "resident aliens" had been inhabitants of the United States for decades, but had been deprived by law of being able to become naturalized citizens. Also part of the West Coast removal were 101 orphaned children of Japanese descent taken from orphanages and foster homes within the exclusion zone.

Detainees of Japanese descent were first sent to one of 17 temporary "Civilian Assembly Centers", where most awaited transfer to more permanent relocation centers being constructed by the newly formed War Relocation Authority (WRA). Some of those who reported to the civilian assembly centers were not sent to relocation centers, but were released under the condition that they remain outside the prohibited zone until the military orders were modified or lifted. Almost 120,000 Japanese Americans and resident Japanese aliens were forcibly removed from their homes on the West Coast and Southern Arizona as part of one of the largest forced relocations in U.S. history, widely recognized as being motivated by racial discrimination during World War II.

Most of these camps/residences, gardens, and stock areas were placed on Native American reservations, for which the Native Americans were formally compensated. The Native American councils disputed the amounts negotiated in absentia by US government authorities. They later sued to gain relief and additional compensation for some items of dispute.

Under the National Student Council Relocation Program (supported primarily by the American Friends Service Committee), students of college age were permitted to leave the camps to attend institutions willing to accept students of Japanese ancestry. Although the program initially granted leave permits to a very small number of students, this eventually included 2,263 students by December 31, 1943.

=== Conditions in the camps ===
In 1943, Secretary of the Interior Harold L. Ickes wrote "the situation in at least some of the Japanese internment camps is bad and is becoming worse rapidly." The quality of life in the camps was heavily influenced by which government entity was responsible for them. INS Camps were regulated by international treaty. The legal difference between "interned" and relocated had significant effects on those who were imprisoned.

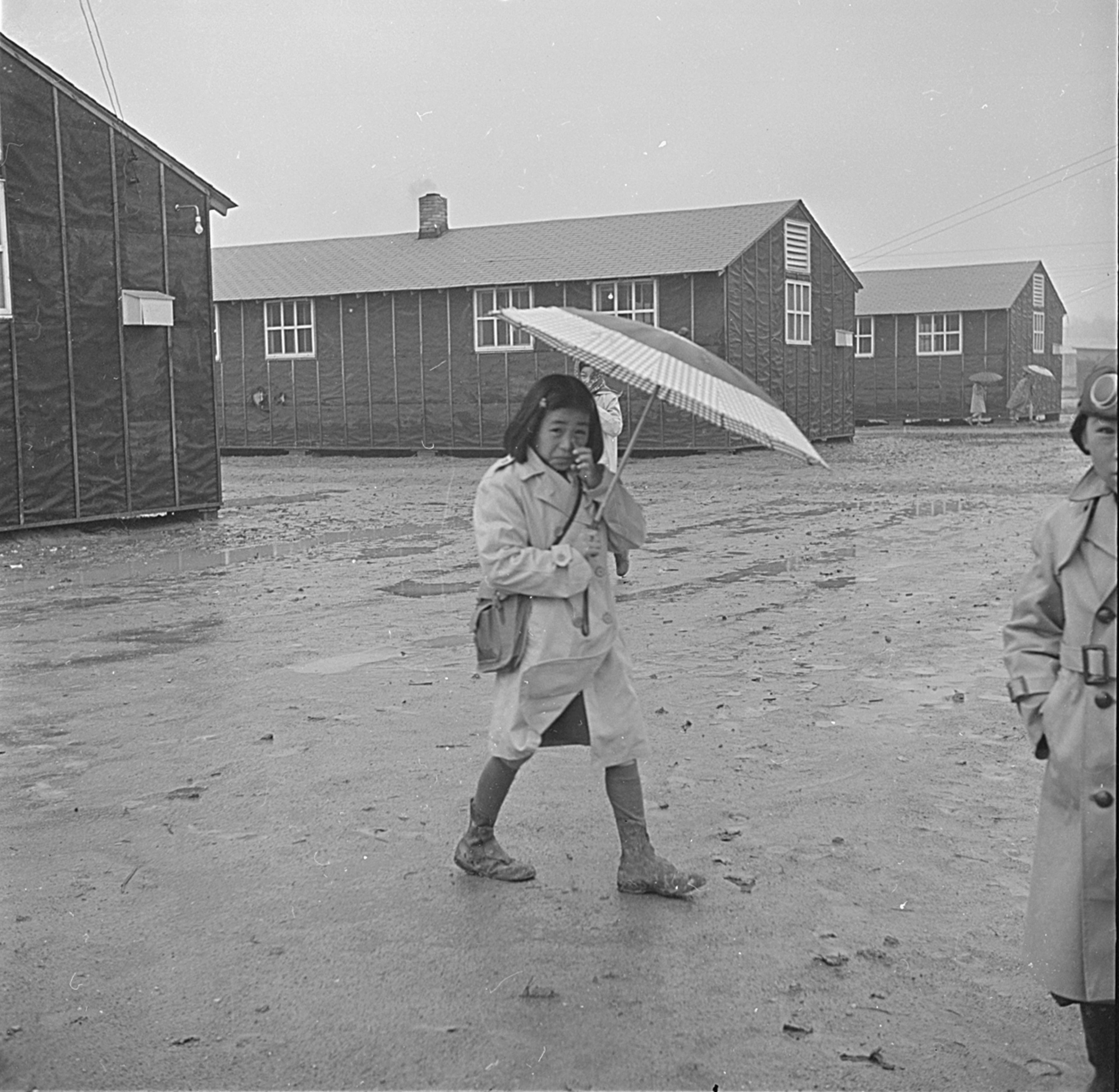
Trudging through the mud during rainy weather at the Jerome Relocation Center

According to a 1943 War Relocation Authority report, inmates were housed in "tar paper-covered barracks of simple frame construction without plumbing or cooking facilities of any kind". The spartan facilities met international laws, but left much to be desired. Many camps were built quickly by civilian contractors during the summer of 1942 based on designs for military barracks, making the buildings poorly equipped for cramped family living. Throughout many camps, twenty-five people were forced to live in space built to contain four, leaving no room for privacy. There are many testimonies that meal times, in particular, caused families to separate. Thousands of internees were even placed in horse stables which reeked of horse manure, with unclean surrounding and zero privacy among the people crowded into swiftly altered tiny spaces. Many of those incarcerated were children, and some historical sources describe long-term psychological effects, including fear, shame, and trauma.

The Heart Mountain War Relocation Center in northwestern Wyoming was a barbed-wire-surrounded enclave with unpartitioned toilets, cots for beds, and a budget of 45 cents daily per capita for food rations.

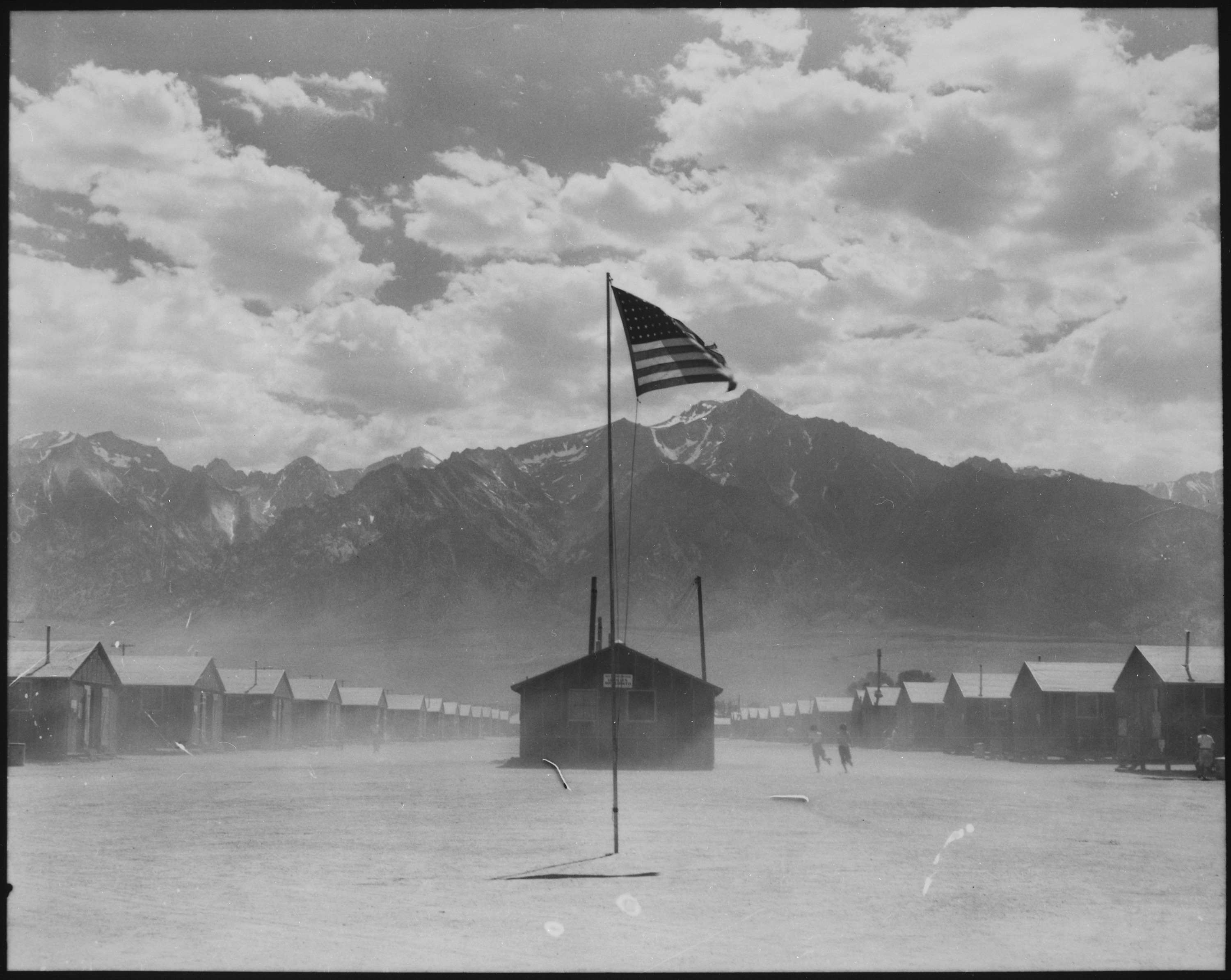
Dust storm at the Manzanar War Relocation Center

Armed guards were posted at the camps, which were all in remote, desolate areas far from population centers. Inmates were typically allowed to stay with their families. There are documented instances of guards shooting inmates who reportedly attempted to walk outside the fences. One such shooting, that of James Wakasa at Topaz, led to a re-evaluation of the security measures in the camps. Some camp administrations eventually allowed relatively free movement outside the marked boundaries of the camps. Nearly a quarter of the inmates left the camps to live and work elsewhere in the United States, outside the exclusion zone. Eventually, some were authorized to return to their hometowns in the exclusion zone under supervision of a sponsoring American family or agency whose loyalty had been assured.

The phrase "shikata ga nai" (loosely translated as "it cannot be helped") was commonly used to summarize the incarcerated families' resignation to their helplessness throughout these conditions. This was noticed by their children, as mentioned in the well-known memoir Farewell to Manzanar by Jeanne Wakatsuki Houston and James D. Houston. Further, it is noted that parents may have internalized these emotions to withhold their disappointment and anguish from affecting their children. Nevertheless, some reports indicate that children still were cognizant of this emotional repression.

==== Medical care ====
Before the war, 87 physicians and surgeons, 137 nurses, 105 dentists, 132 pharmacists, 35 optometrists, and 92 lab technicians provided healthcare to the Japanese American population, with most practicing in urban centers like Los Angeles, San Francisco, and Seattle. As the eviction from the West Coast was carried out, the Wartime Civilian Control Administration worked with the United States Public Health Service (USPHS) and many of these professionals to establish infirmaries within the temporary assembly centers. An Issei doctor was appointed to manage each facility, and additional healthcare staff worked under his supervision, although the USPHS recommendation of one physician for every 1,000 inmates and one nurse to 200 inmates was not met. Overcrowded and unsanitary conditions forced assembly center infirmaries to prioritize inoculations over general care, obstetrics, and surgeries; at Manzanar, for example, hospital staff performed over 40,000 immunizations against typhoid and smallpox. Food poisoning was common and also demanded significant attention. Those who were detained in Topaz, Minidoka, and Jerome experienced outbreaks of dysentery.

Facilities in the more permanent "relocation centers" eventually surpassed the makeshift assembly center infirmaries, but in many cases, these hospitals were incomplete when inmates began to arrive and were not fully functional for several months. Additionally, vital medical supplies such as medications and surgical and sterilization equipment were limited. The staff shortages suffered in the assembly centers continued in the WRA camps. The administration's decision to invert the management structure and demote Japanese American medical workers to positions below white employees, while capping their pay rate at $20/month, further exacerbated this problem. (At Heart Mountain, for example, Japanese American doctors received $19/month compared to white nurses' $150/month.) The war had caused a shortage of healthcare professionals across the country, and the camps often lost potential recruits to outside hospitals that offered better pay and living conditions. When the WRA began to allow some Japanese Americans to leave camp, many Nikkei medical professionals resettled outside the camp. Those who remained had little authority in the administration of the hospitals. Combined with the inequitable payment of salaries between white and Japanese American employees, conflicts arose at several hospitals, and there were two Japanese American walk-outs at Heart Mountain in 1943.

Despite a shortage of healthcare workers, limited access to equipment, and tension between white administrators and Japanese American staff, these hospitals provided much-needed medical care in camp. The extreme climates of the remote incarceration sites were hard on infants and elderly prisoners. The frequent dust storms of the high desert locations led to increased cases of asthma and coccidioidomycosis, while the swampy, mosquito-infested Arkansas camps exposed residents to malaria, all of which were treated in camp. Almost 6,000 live deliveries were performed in these hospitals, and all mothers received pre- and postnatal care. The WRA recorded 1,862 deaths across the ten camps, with cancer, heart disease, tuberculosis, and vascular disease accounting for the majority.

=== Education ===
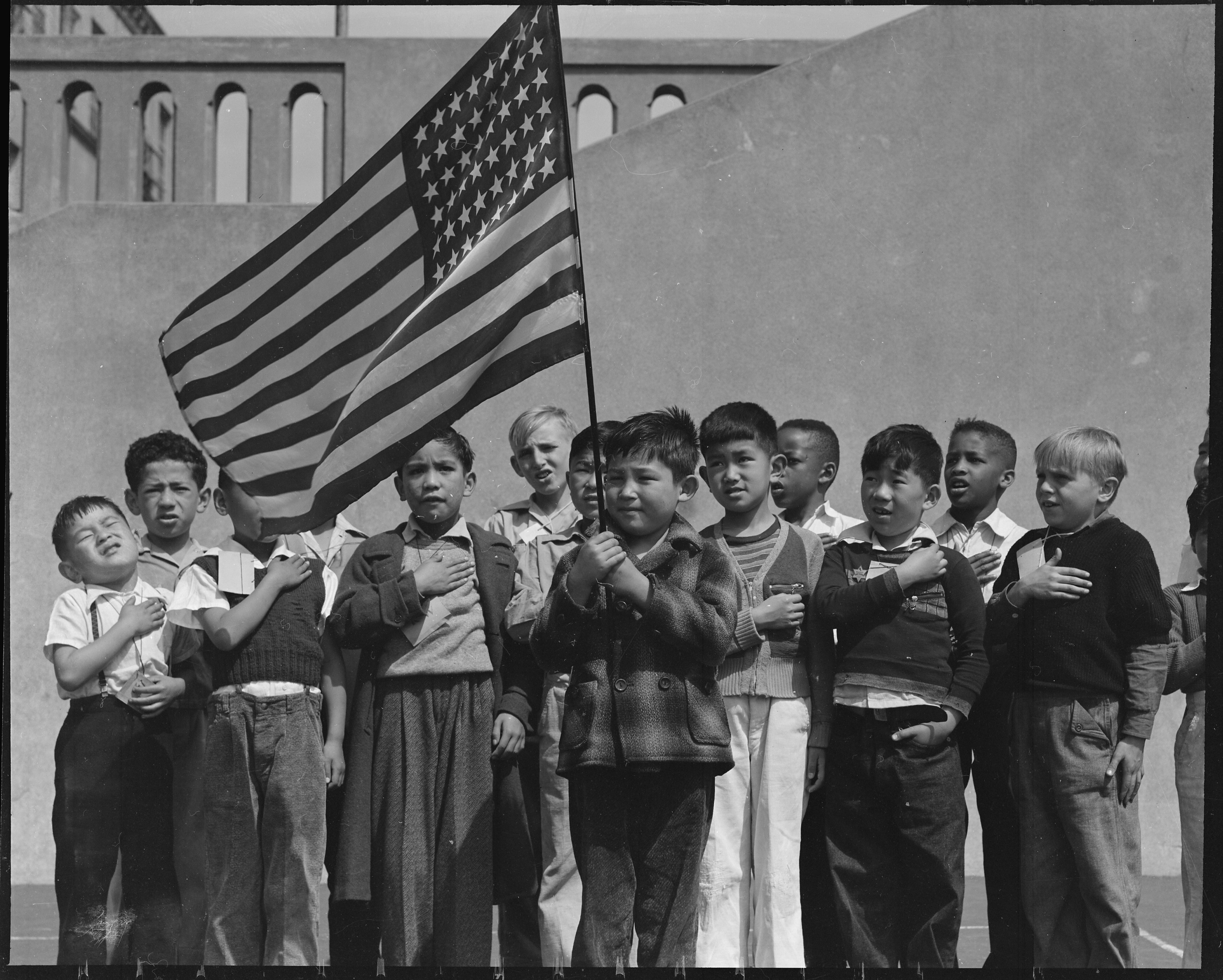
Flag of allegiance pledge at Raphael Weill Public School, Geary and Buchanan Streets, San Francisco, April 20, 1942

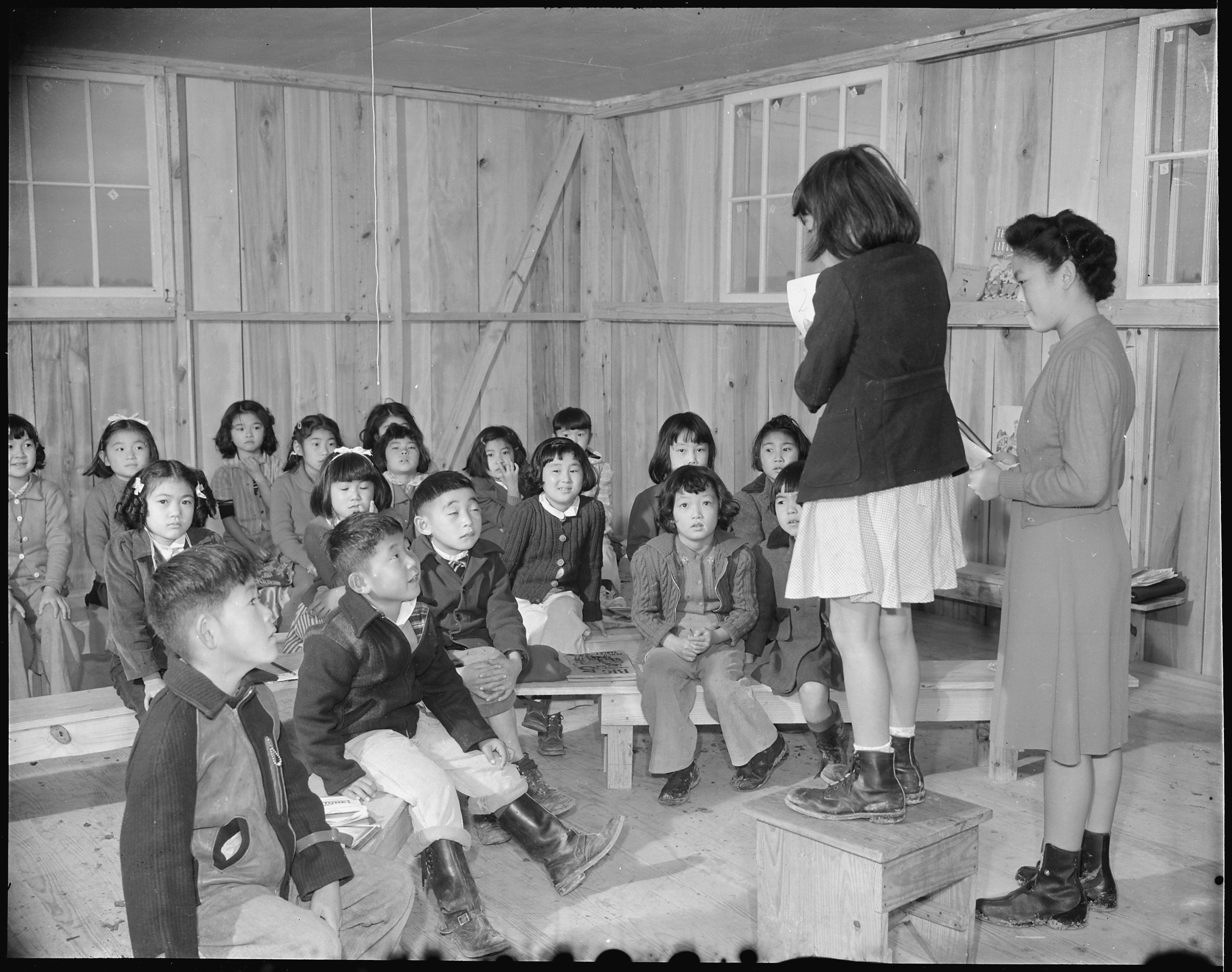
Teacher Lily Namimoto and her second grade class

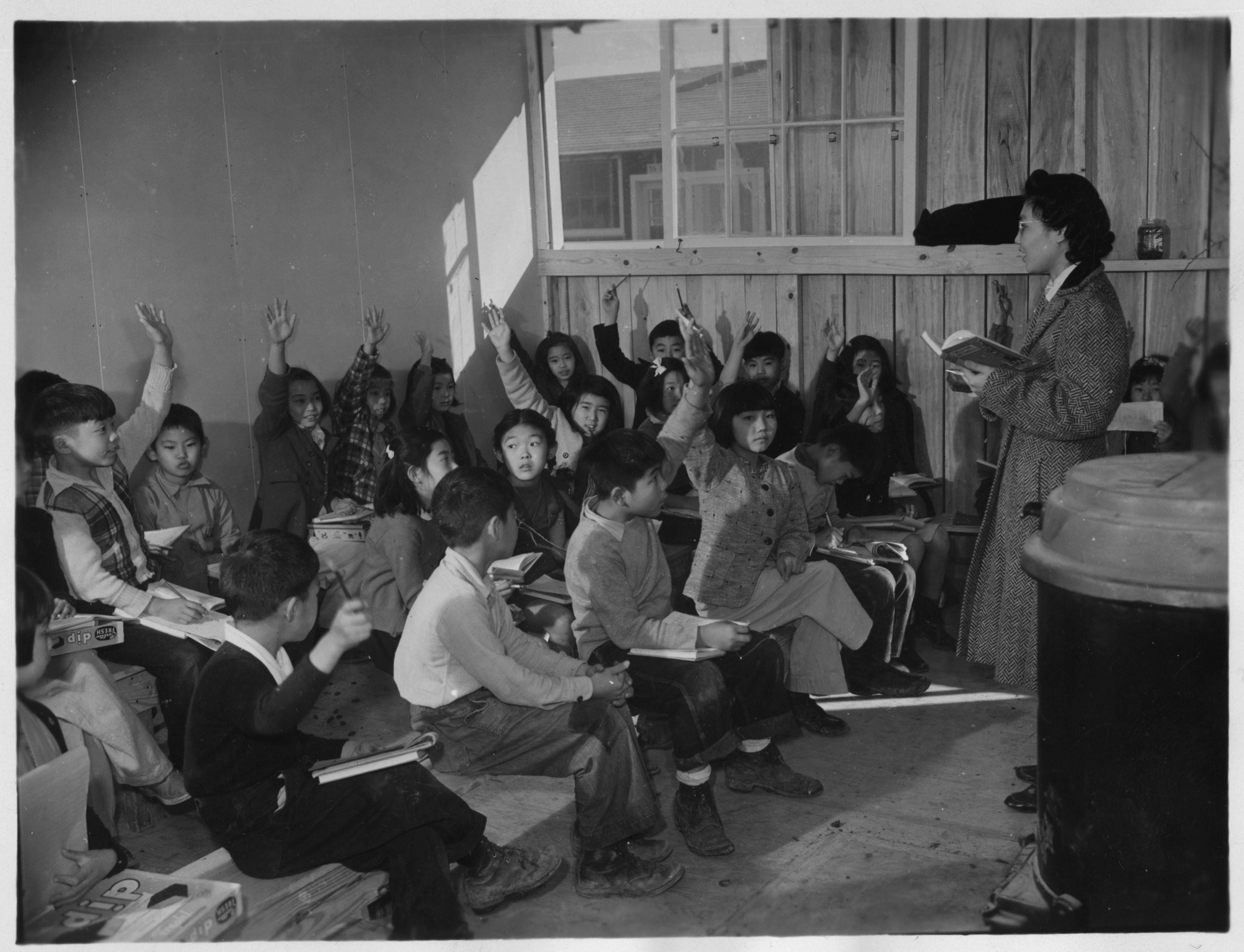
Fourth grade class in barracks 3-4-B at Rohwer

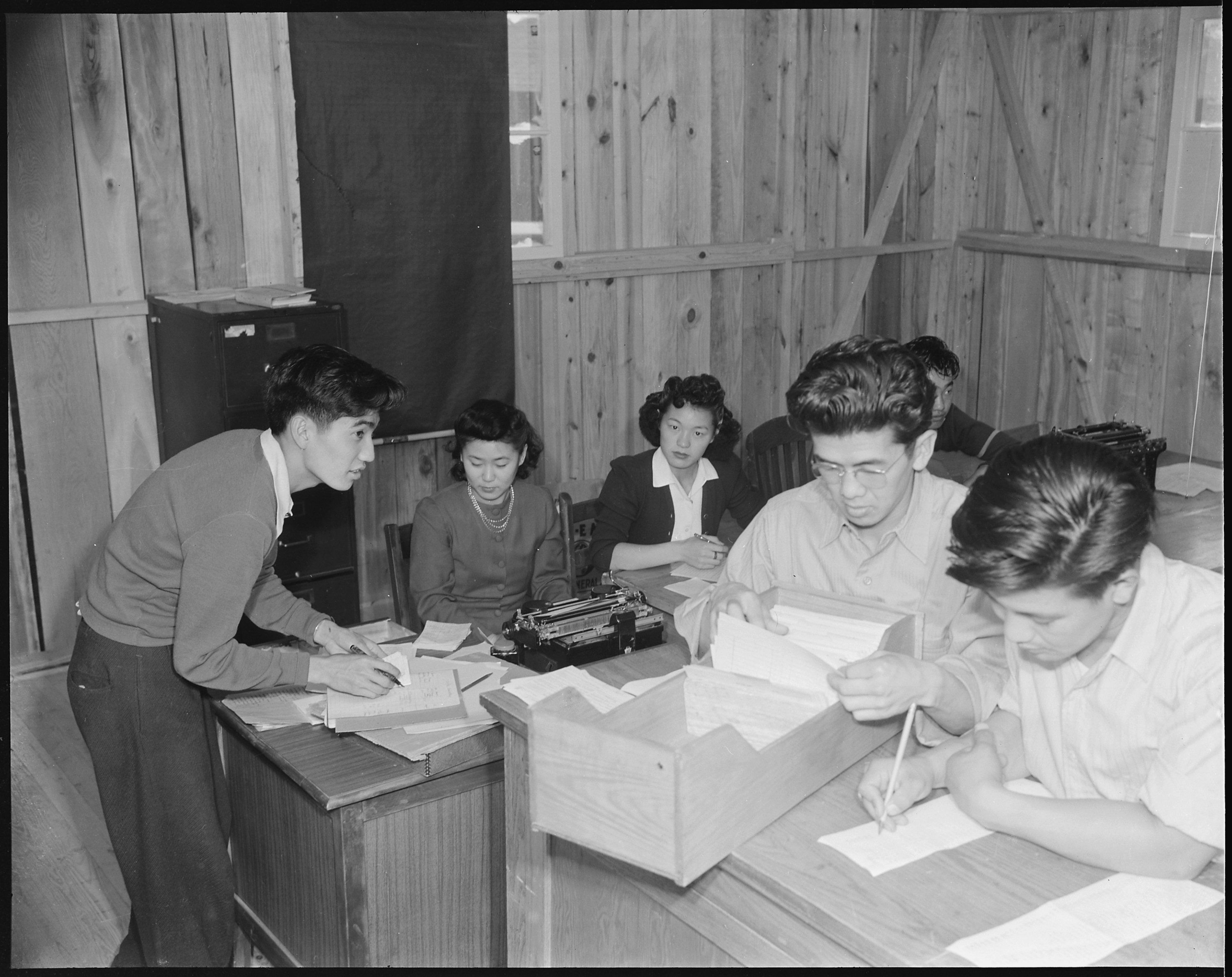
General office in the high school at Rohwer

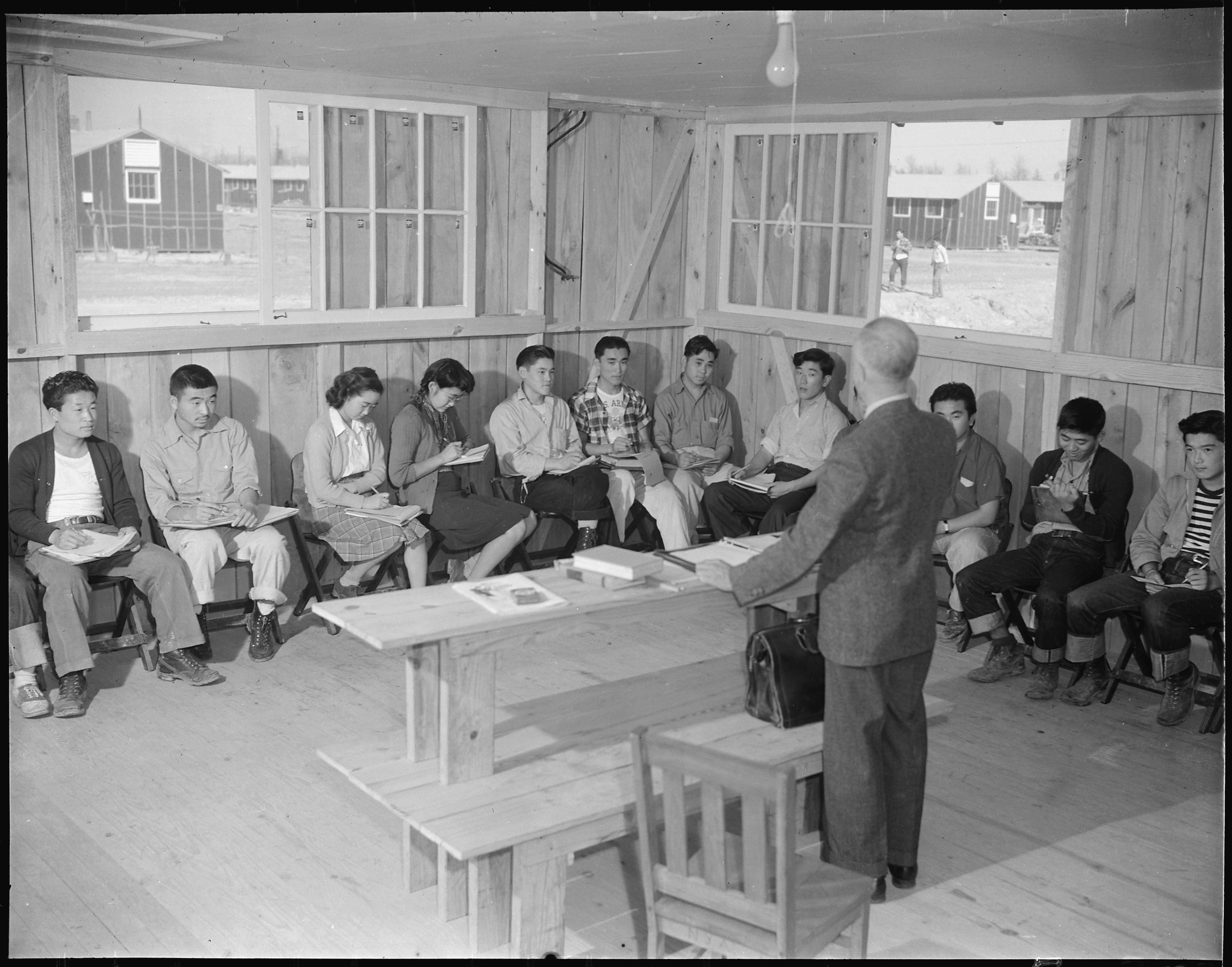
Senior physics class in barracks 11-F at the temporary high school quarters

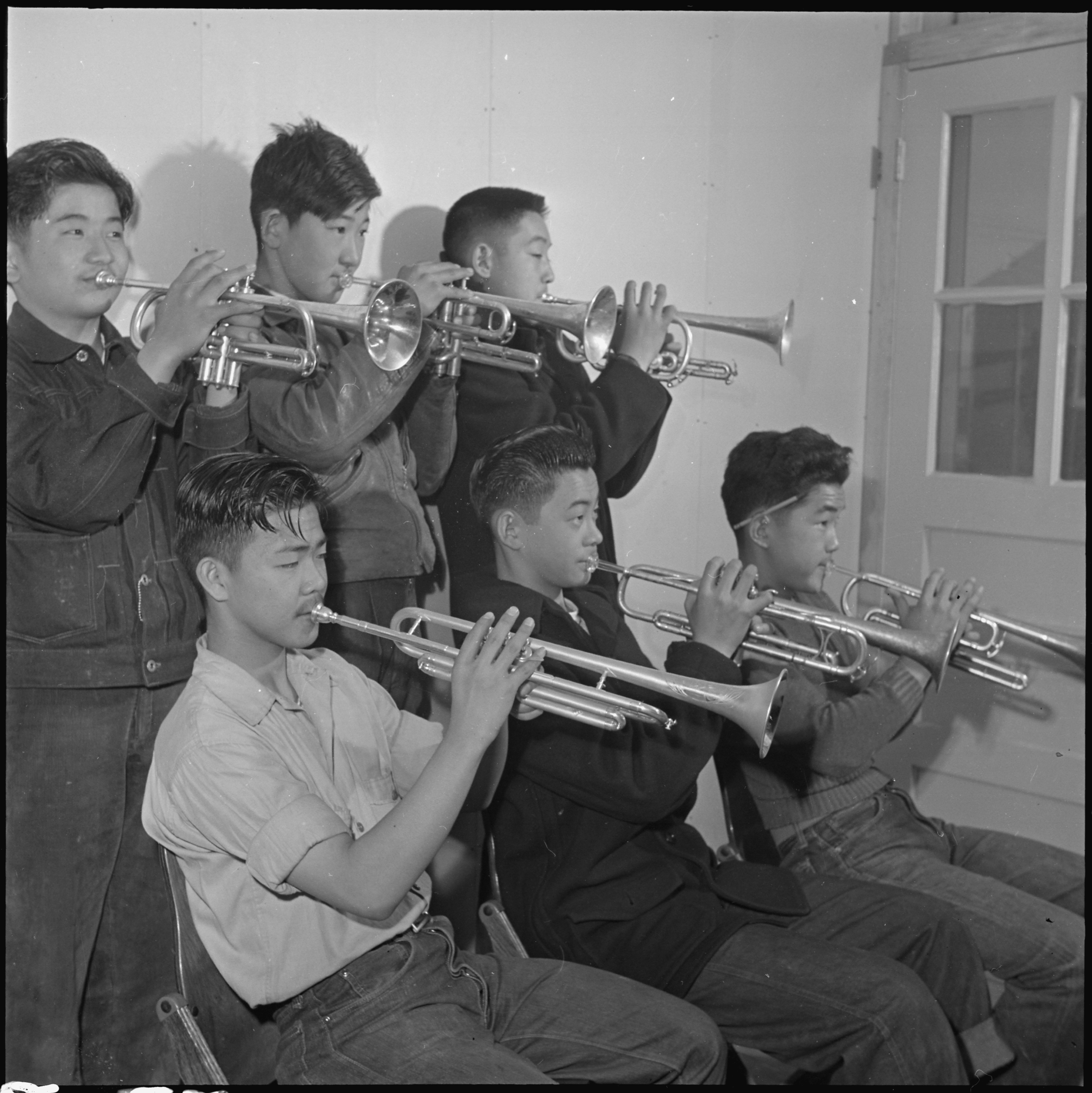
A part of the brass section of the high school band

Of the 110,000 Japanese Americans detained by the United States government during World War II, 30,000 were children. Most were school-age children, so educational facilities were set up in the camps. The government had not adequately planned for the camps, and no real budget or plan was set aside for the new camp educational facilities. Camp schoolhouses were crowded and had insufficient materials, books, notebooks, and desks for students. Books were only issued a month after the opening. In the Southwest, the schoolhouses were extremely hot in summertime. Class sizes were very large. At the height of its attendance, the Rohwer Camp of Arkansas reached 2,339, with only 45 certified teachers. The student to teacher ratio in the camps was 48:1 in elementary schools and 35:1 for secondary schools, compared to the national average of 28:1. There was a general teacher shortage in the US at the time, and the teachers were required to live in the camps themselves. Although the salary in the camps was triple that for regular teaching jobs, authorities were still unable to fill all the teaching positions with certified personnel, and so some non-certified teacher detainees were hired as assistants. Students of all ages graduated and obtained diplomas while in the camp. Graduation celebrations, such as one that took place at Santa Anita in 1942, were well attended. The camp's jazz band, The Starlight Serenaders, played music for over three hundred students spanning from grammar school graduates to those obtaining university degrees.

As early as spring 1942, inmates in WCCA assembly camps began the orchestration of informal music education programs, such as in the Santa Anita Detention Center. By June of that year, the music department employed four teachers who instructed over three hundred students and had obtained six pianos for classroom instruction. Ruth Watanabe, a student in musicology at USC before the evacuation, organized much of Santa Anita’s music education programming, including coordinating a "record-loan" system with friends outside the camp to provide students with a variety of European classical musicians. During the incarceration at permanent relocation camps, often times those with experience in classical Japanese song and dance were employed directly by the WRA. Bando Misa, an inmate at Tule Lake and an instructor of Japanese classical dance, earned a salary of nineteen dollars a month through the camp’s Recreation Department. At Poston, Haruo "Foozie" Fujisawa, a member of The Music Makers, one of the many jazz bands spread throughout 9 of 10 relocation camps, transported his drum kit from home and gave lessons through the camp’s Music Department. Class sizes varied across camps; generally, enrollment was in the double digits but could reach as many as 140 students in one class. The ages of students extended beyond the typical classroom demographics of young Nisei and Sansei; the inclusion of Issei adults and seniors was not unheard of.

=== Sports ===
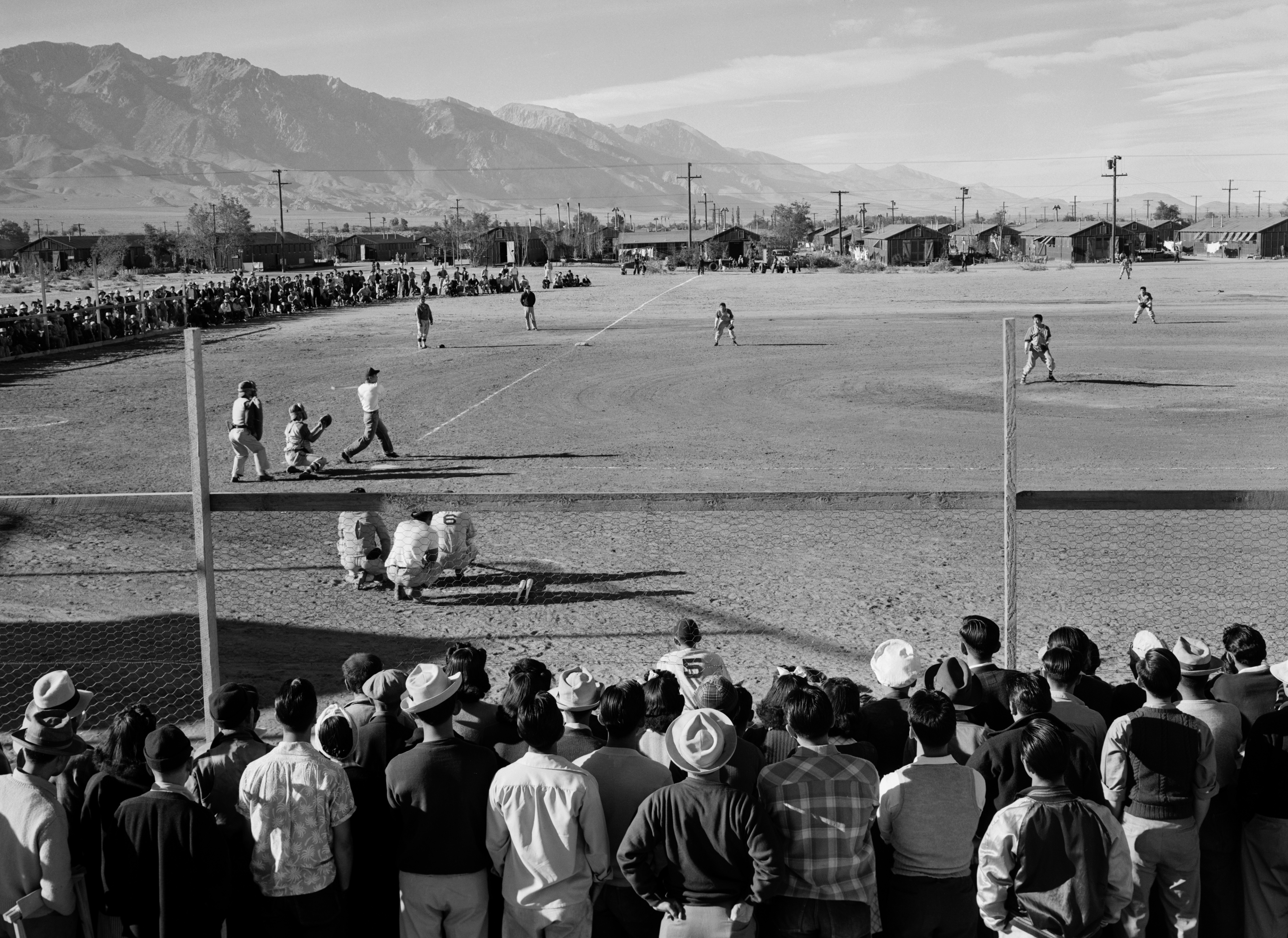
A baseball game at Manzanar. Picture by Ansel Adams, c. 1943.

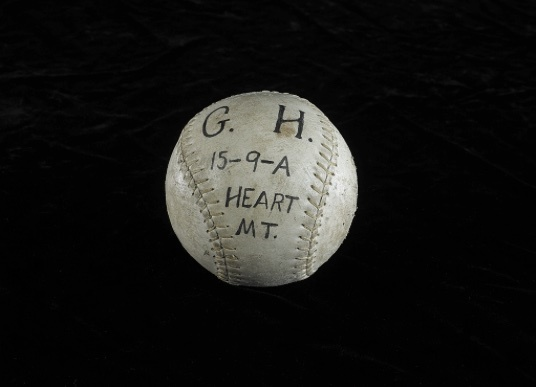
Smithsonian photo of softball from the Heart Mountain Relocation Center

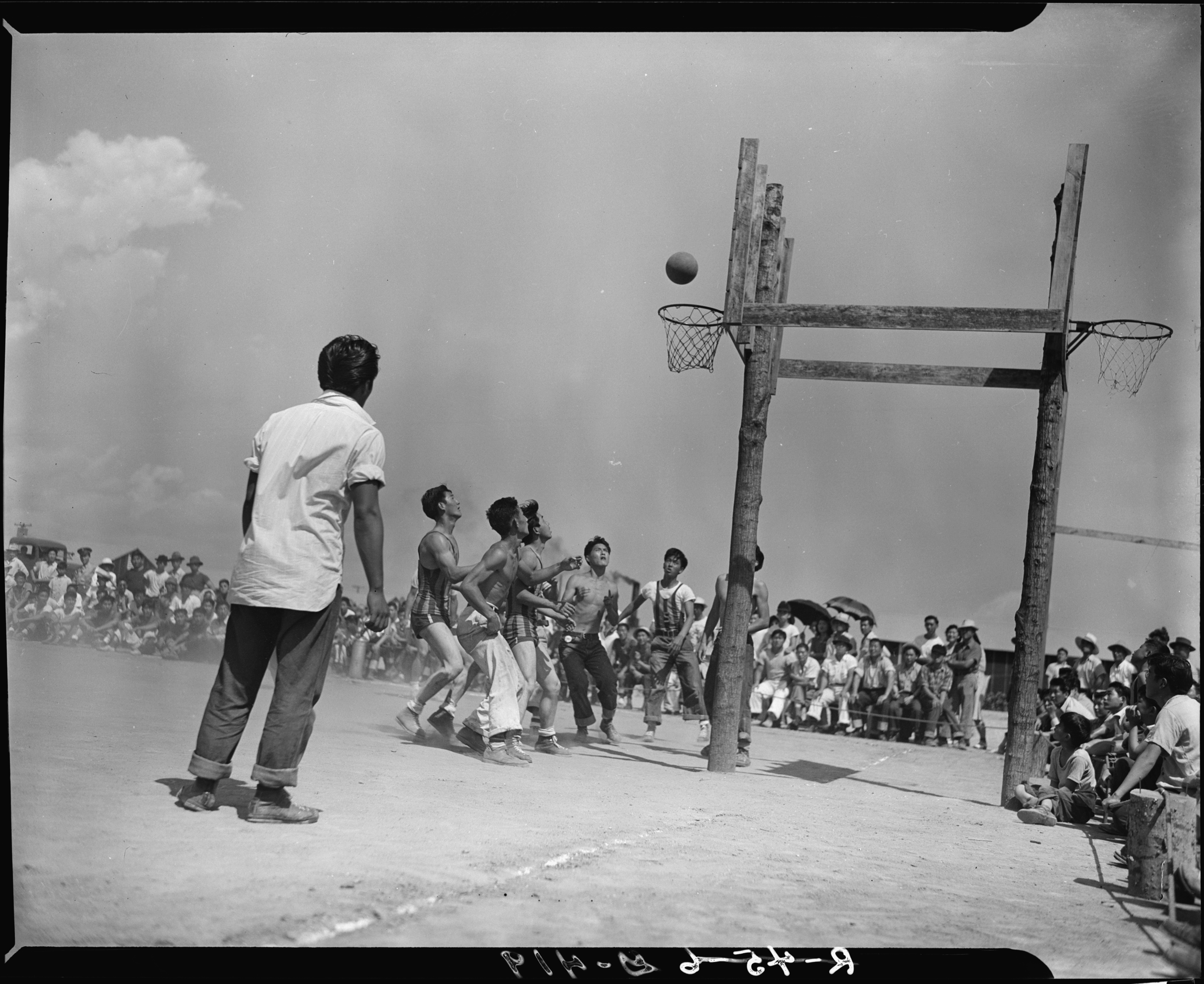
A basketball game at the Rohwer Relocation Center

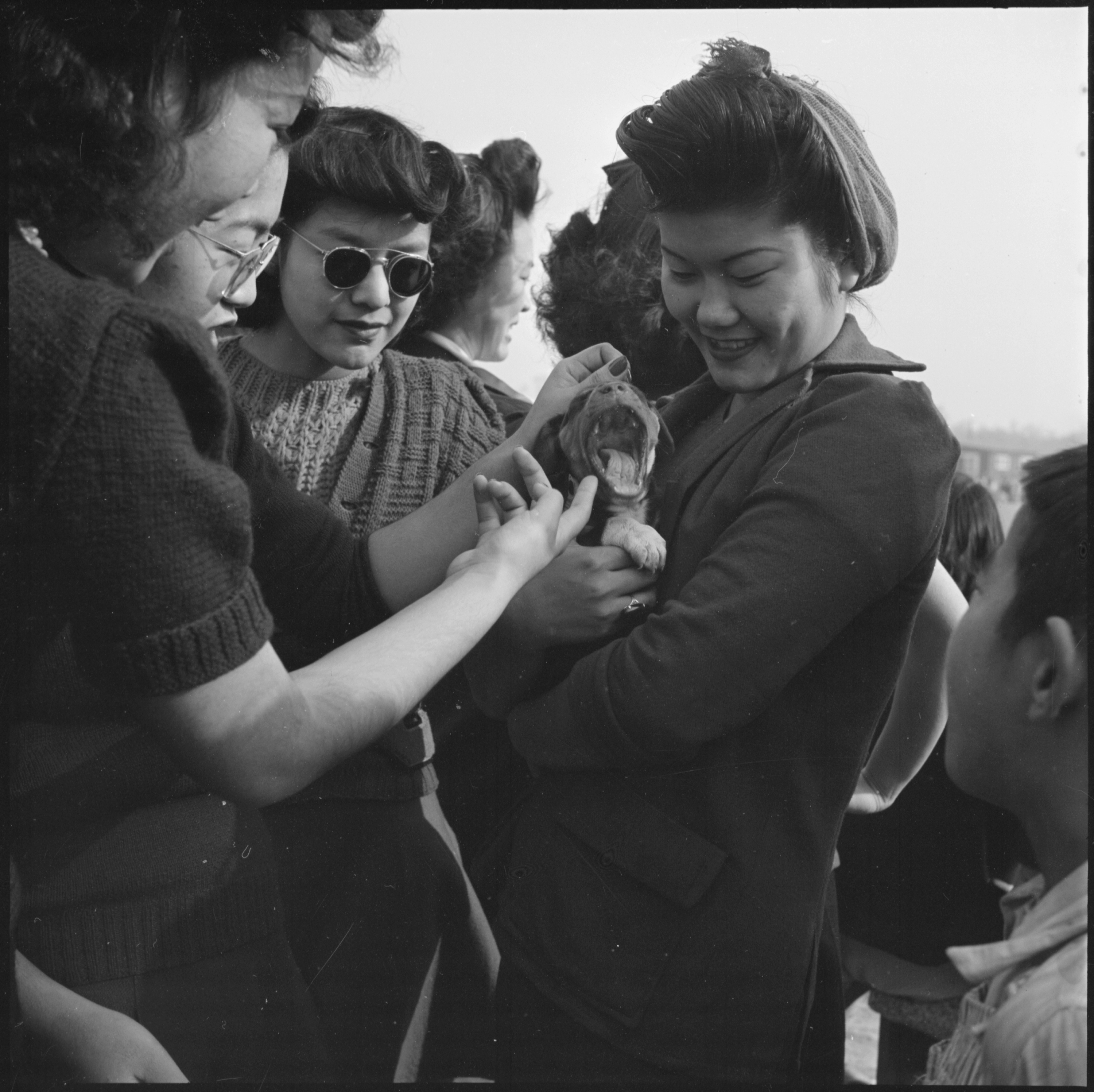
A group of girls around a puppy at a football game

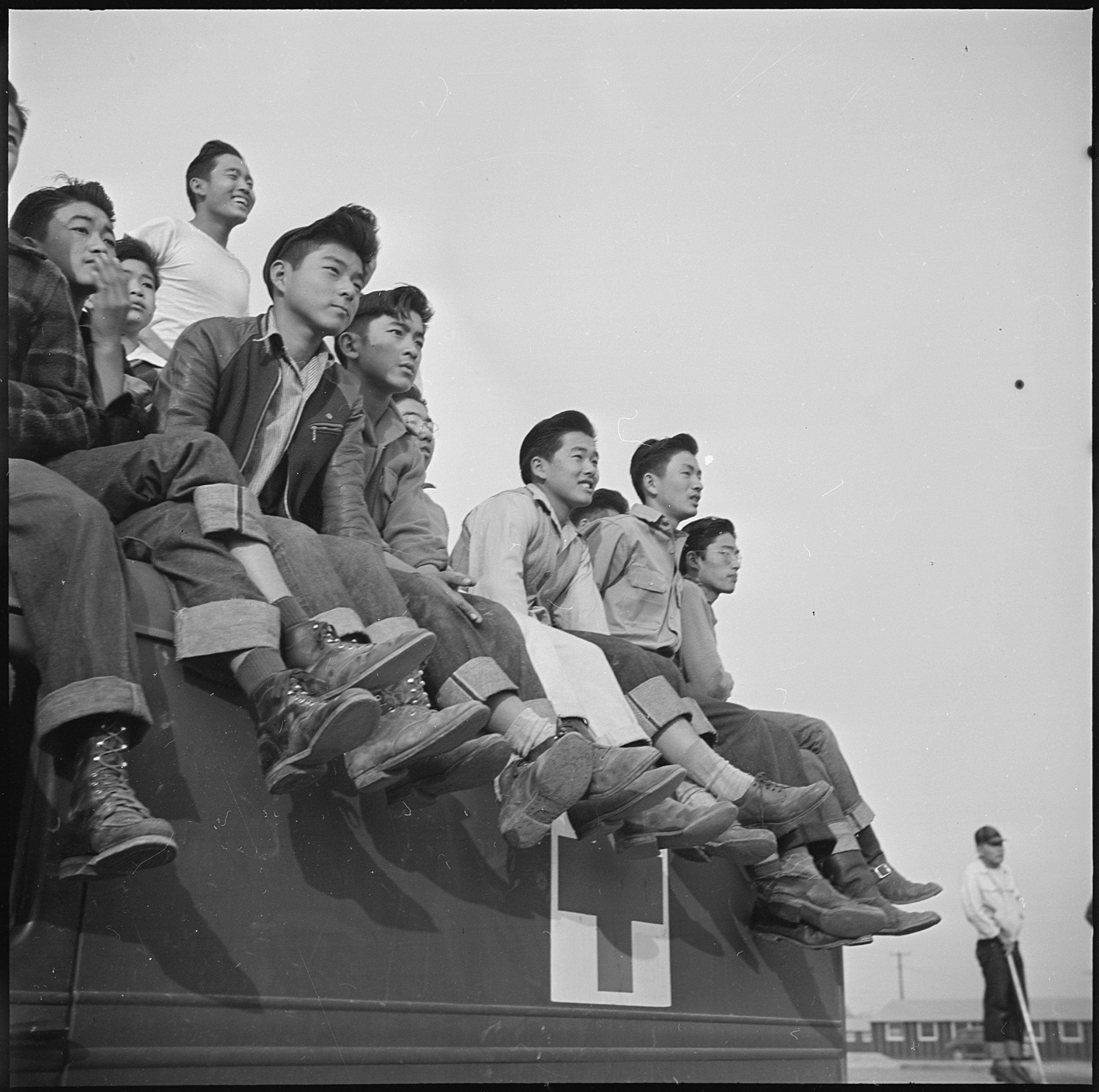
A tense moment in a football game between the Stockton and Santa Anita teams

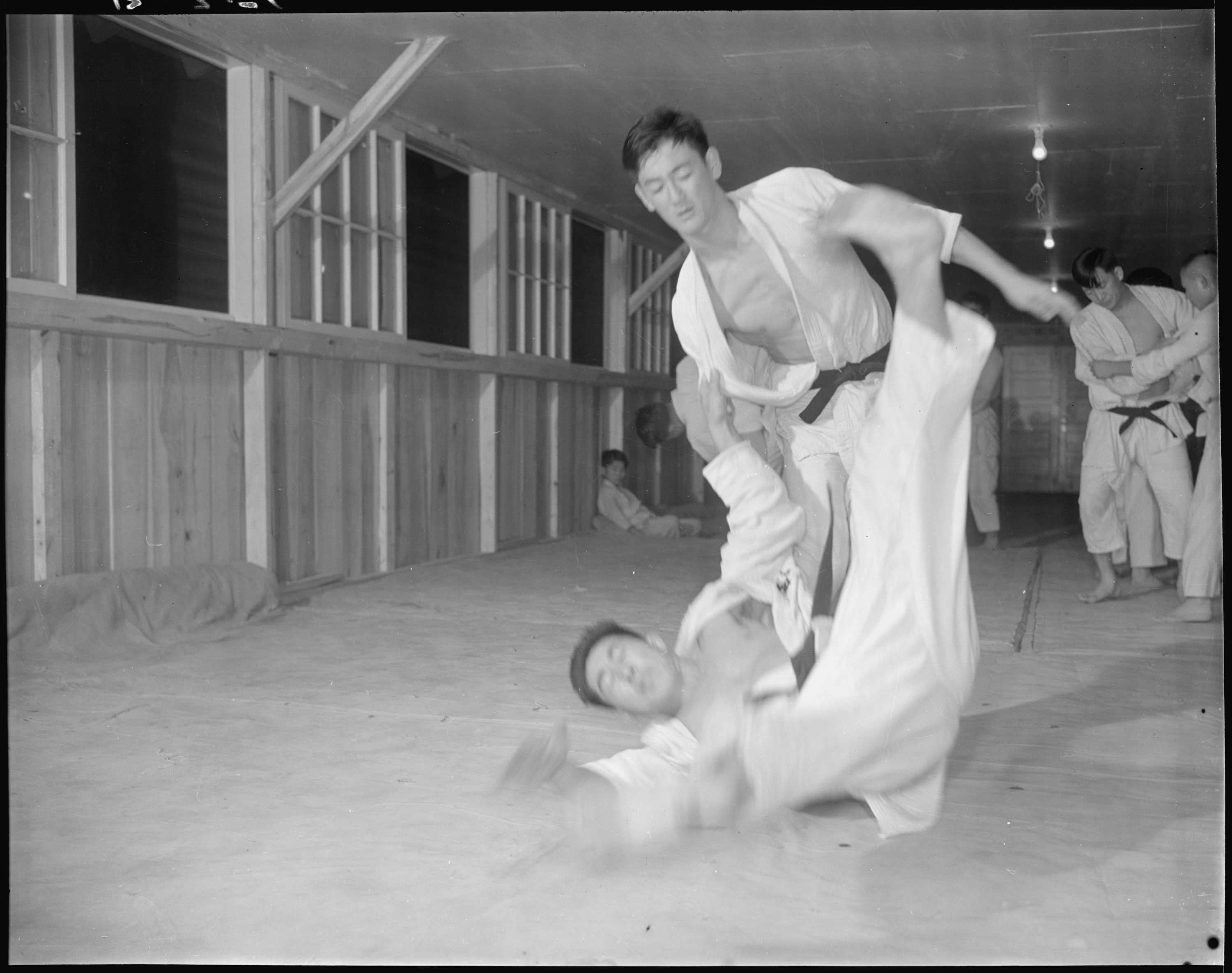
A judo class at Rohwer. Classes were held every afternoon and evening.

Although life in the camps was very difficult, Japanese Americans formed many different sports teams, including baseball and football teams. In January 1942, President Franklin D. Roosevelt issued what came to be known as the "Green Light Letter" to MLB Commissioner Kenesaw Mountain Landis, which urged him to continue playing Major League Baseball games despite the ongoing war. In it Roosevelt said that "baseball provides a recreation", and this was true for Japanese American incarcerees as well. Over 100 baseball teams were formed in the Manzanar camp so that Japanese Americans could have some recreation, and some of the team names were carry-overs from teams formed before the incarceration.

Both men and women participated in the sports. In some cases, the Japanese American baseball teams from the camps traveled to outside communities to play other teams. Incarcerees from Idaho competed in the state tournament in 1943, and there were games between the prison guards and the Japanese American teams. Branch Rickey, who would be responsible for bringing Jackie Robinson into Major League Baseball in 1947, sent a letter to all of the WRA camps expressing interest in scouting some of the Nisei players. In the fall of 1943, three players tried out for the Brooklyn Dodgers in front of MLB scout George Sisler, but none of them made the team.

=== Tule Lake Agricultural Program ===
The Tule Lake agricultural program was constructed with the purpose of growing crops in order to feed both detainees in their camp and in the other camps. It is said that any extras would be sold on the open market. The agricultural program was a way for inmates to be employed while at the center, as well as a way for some to learn farming skills. A 4-H program was established to pave a way for children to help the agricultural process at the center. From 1942 through 1945, Tule Lake produced 29 different crops, including Japanese vegetables like daikon, gobo, and nappa.

=== Student leave to attend Eastern colleges ===
Japanese American students were no longer allowed to attend college in the West during the incarceration, and many found ways to transfer or attend schools in the Midwest and East in order to continue their education.

Most Nisei college students followed their families into camp, but a small number arranged for transfers to schools outside the exclusion zone. Their initial efforts expanded as sympathetic college administrators and the American Friends Service Committee began to coordinate a larger student relocation program. The Friends petitioned WRA Director Milton Eisenhower to place college students in Eastern and Midwestern academic institutions.

The National Japanese American Student Relocation Council was formed on May 29, 1942, and the AFSC administered the program. The acceptance process vetted college students and graduating high school students through academic achievement and a questionnaire centering on their relationship with American culture. Some high school students were also able to leave the incarceration camps through boarding schools. 39 percent of the Nisei students were women. The student's tuition, book costs, and living expenses were absorbed by the U.S. government, private foundations (such as the Columbia Foundation and the Carnegie Corporation) and church scholarships, in addition to significant fundraising efforts led by Issei parents in camp.

Outside camp, the students took on the role of "ambassadors of good will", and the NJASRC and WRA promoted this image to soften anti-Japanese prejudice and prepare the public for the resettlement of Japanese Americans in their communities. Some students worked as domestic workers in nearby communities during the school year.

At Earlham College, President William Dennis helped institute a program that enrolled several dozen Japanese American students in order to spare them from incarceration. While this action was controversial in Richmond, Indiana, it helped strengthen the college's ties to Japan and the Japanese American community. At Park College in Missouri, Dr. William Lindsay Young attempted to get Nisei students enrolled despite backlash from the greater Parkville city.

At Oberlin College, about 40 evacuated Nisei students were enrolled. One of them, Kenji Okuda, was elected as student council president. Three Nisei students were enrolled at Mount Holyoke College during World War 2.

In total, over 500 institutions east of the exclusion zone opened their doors to more than 3,000 college-age youth who had been placed behind barbed wire, many of whom were enrolled in West Coast schools prior to their removal. These included a variety of schools, from small liberal arts colleges to large public universities.

The NJASRC ceased operations on June 7, 1946. After the incarceration camps had been shut down, releasing many Issei parents with little belongings, many families followed the college students to the eastern cities where they attended school. In 1980, former Nisei students formed the NSRC Nisei Student Relocation Commemorative Fund. In 2021, The University of Southern California apologized for discriminating against Nisei students. It issued posthumous degrees to the students whose educations were cut short or illegitimated, having already issued degrees to those surviving.

=== Loyalty questions and segregation ===
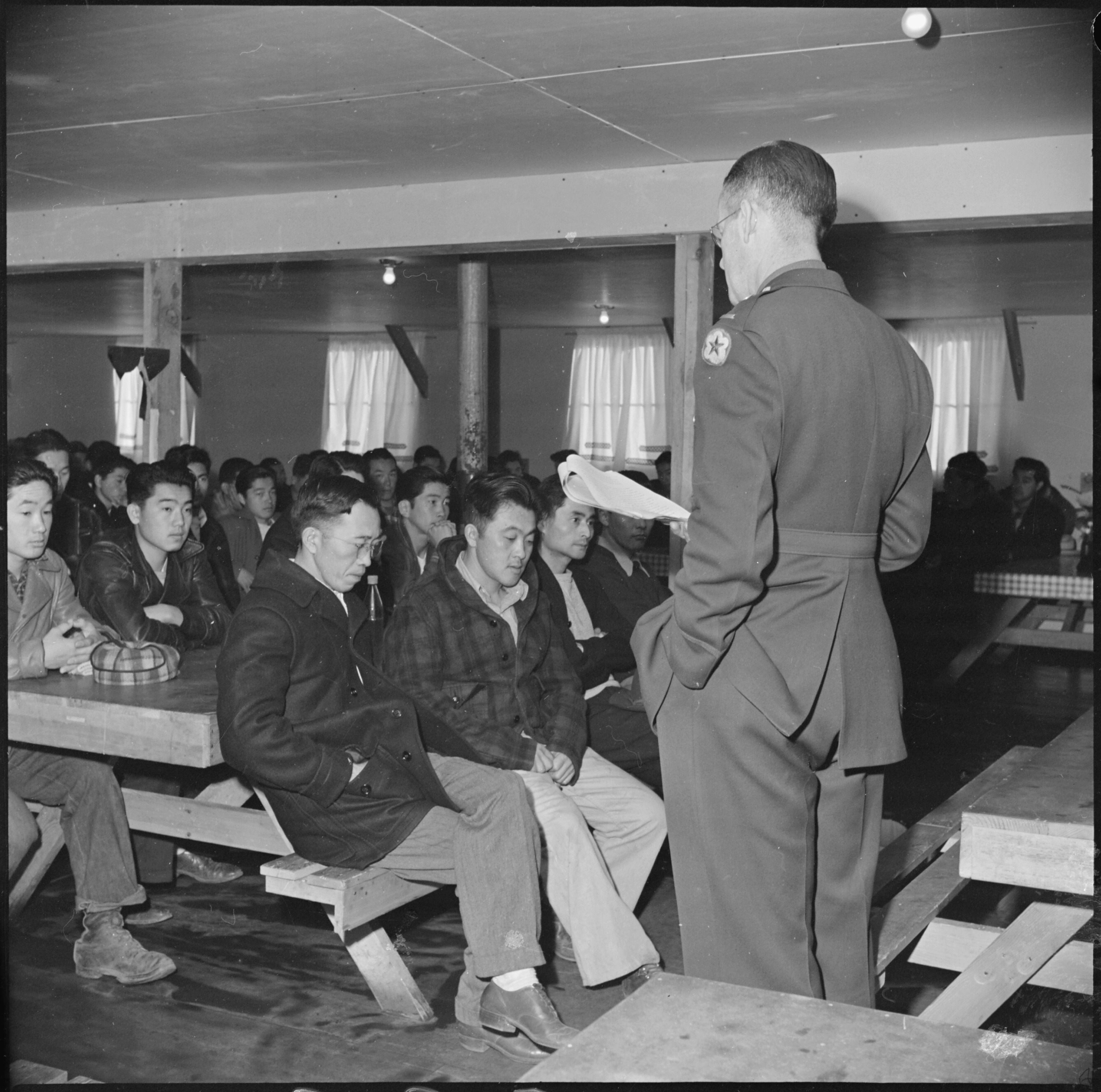
Lt. Eugene Bogard, commanding officer of the Army Registration team, explains the purpose of registration to a group of Japanese Americans at Manzanar (February 11, 1943). All inmates between the ages of 18 and 38 were compelled to register.

In early 1943, War Relocation Authority officials, working with the War Department and the Office of Naval Intelligence, circulated a questionnaire in an attempt to determine the loyalty of incarcerated Nisei men they hoped to recruit into military service. The "Statement of United States Citizen of Japanese Ancestry" was initially given only to Nisei who were eligible for service (or would have been, but for the 4-C classification imposed on them at the start of the war). Authorities soon revised the questionnaire and required all adults in camp to complete the form. Most of the 28 questions were designed to assess the "Americanness" of the respondent — had they been educated in Japan or the U.S.? were they Buddhist or Christian? did they practice judo or play on a baseball team? The final two questions on the form, which soon came to be known as the "loyalty questionnaire", were more direct:

Question 27: Are you willing to serve in the armed forces of the United States on combat duty, wherever ordered? Question 28: Will you swear unqualified allegiances to the United States of America and faithfully defend the United States from any and all attack by foreign or domestic forces, and forswear any form of allegiance or obedience to the Japanese emperor, or other foreign government, power or organization?

Across the camps, people who answered No to both questions became known as "No Nos".

While most camp inmates simply answered "yes" to both questions, several thousand — 17 percent of the total respondents, 20 percent of the Nisei — gave negative or qualified replies out of confusion, fear or anger at the wording and implications of the questionnaire. In regard to Question 27, many worried that expressing a willingness to serve would be equated with volunteering for combat, while others felt insulted at being asked to risk their lives for a country that had imprisoned them and their families. An affirmative answer to Question 28 brought up other issues. Some believed that renouncing their loyalty to Japan would suggest that they had at some point been loyal to Japan and disloyal to the United States. Many believed they were to be deported to Japan no matter how they answered, they feared an explicit disavowal of the Emperor would become known and make such resettlement extremely difficult.

On July 15, 1943, Tule Lake, the site with the highest number of "no" responses to the questionnaire, was designated to house inmates whose answers suggested they were "disloyal". During the remainder of 1943 and into early 1944, more than 12,000 men, women and children were transferred from other camps to the maximum-security Tule Lake Segregation Center.

Afterward, the government passed the Renunciation Act of 1944, a law that made it possible for Nisei and Kibei to renounce their American citizenship. A total of 5,589 detainees opted to do so; 5,461 of these were sent to Tule Lake. Of those who renounced US citizenship, 1,327 were repatriated to Japan. Those persons who stayed in the US faced discrimination from the Japanese American community, both during and after the war, for having made that choice of renunciation. At the time, they feared what their futures held were they to remain American and remain incarcerated.

These renunciations of American citizenship have been highly controversial, for a number of reasons. Some apologists for incarceration have cited the renunciations as evidence that "disloyalty" or anti-Americanism was well represented among the incarcerated peoples, thereby justifying the incarceration. Many historians have dismissed the latter argument, for its failure to consider that the small number of individuals in question had been mistreated and persecuted by their own government at the time of the "renunciation":

[T]he renunciations had little to do with "loyalty" or "disloyalty" to the United States, but were instead the result of a series of complex conditions and factors that were beyond the control of those involved. Prior to discarding citizenship, most or all of the renunciants had experienced the following misfortunes: forced removal from homes; loss of jobs; government and public assumption of disloyalty to the land of their birth based on race alone; and incarceration in a "segregation center" for "disloyal" ISSEI or NISEI...

Minoru Kiyota, who was among those who renounced his citizenship and soon came to regret the decision, has said that he wanted only "to express my fury toward the government of the United States", for his incarceration and for the mental and physical duress, as well as the intimidation, he was made to face.

[M]y renunciation had been an expression of momentary emotional defiance in reaction to years of persecution suffered by myself and other Japanese Americans and, in particular, to the degrading interrogation by the FBI agent at Topaz and being terrorized by the guards and gangs at Tule Lake.

Civil rights attorney Wayne M. Collins successfully challenged most of these renunciations as invalid, owing to the conditions of duress and intimidation under which the government obtained them. Many of the deportees were Issei (first generation) or Kibei, who often had difficulty with English and often did not understand the questions they were asked. Even among those Issei who had a clear understanding, Question 28 posed an awkward dilemma: Japanese immigrants were denied U.S. citizenship at the time, so when asked to renounce their Japanese citizenship, answering "Yes" would have made them stateless persons.

When the government began seeking army volunteers from among the camps, only 6% of military-aged male inmates volunteered to serve in the U.S. Armed Forces. Most of those who refused tempered that refusal with statements of willingness to fight if they were restored their rights as American citizens. Eventually 33,000 Japanese American men and many Japanese American women served in the U.S. military during World War II, of which 20,000 served in the U.S. Army.

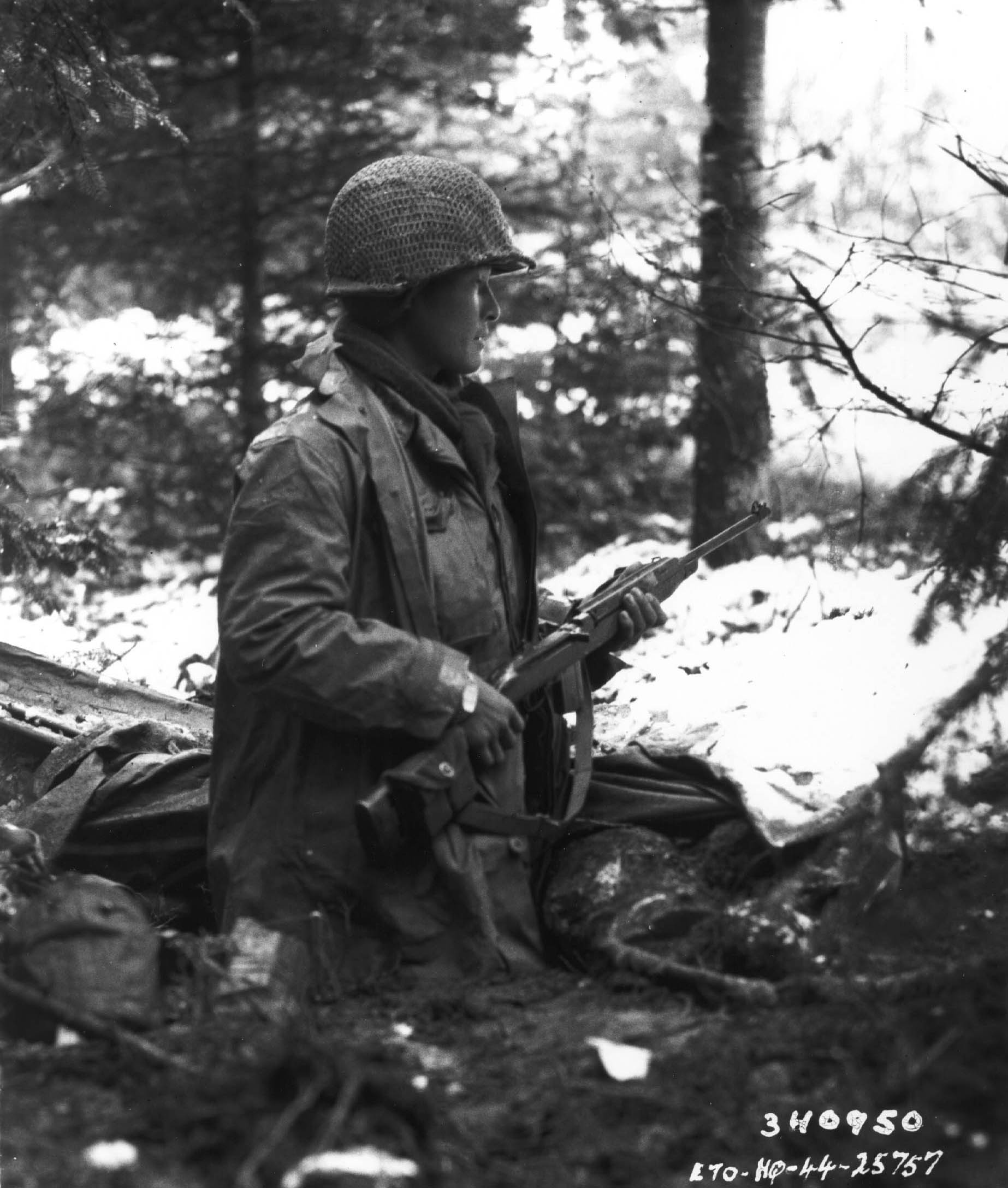
The 100th/442nd Regimental Combat Team, which was composed primarily of Japanese Americans, served with uncommon distinction in the European Theatre of World War II. Many of the soldiers from the continental U.S. serving in the units had families who were held in concentration camps in the United States while they fought abroad.

The 100th Infantry Battalion, which was formed in June 1942 with 1,432 men of Japanese descent from the Hawaii National Guard, was sent to Camps McCoy and Shelby for advanced training. Because of the 100th's superior training record, the War Department authorized the formation of the 442nd Regimental Combat Team. When the call was made, 10,000 young men from Hawaii volunteered with eventually 2,686 being chosen along with 1,500 from the continental U.S. The 100th Infantry Battalion landed in Salerno, Italy in September 1943 and became known as the Purple Heart Battalion. This legendary outfit was joined by the 442nd RCT in June 1944, and this combined unit became the most highly decorated U.S. military unit of its size and duration in U.S. military history. The 442nd's Nisei segregated field artillery battalion, then on detached service within the U.S. Army in Bavaria, liberated at least one of the satellite labor camps of the Nazis' original Dachau concentration camp on April 29, 1945, and only days later, on May 2, halted a death march in southern Bavaria.

=== Proving commitment to the United States ===
Many Nisei worked to prove themselves as loyal American citizens. Of the 20,000 Japanese Americans who served in the Army during World War II, "many Japanese American soldiers had gone to war to fight racism at home" and they were "proving with their blood, their limbs, and their bodies that they were truly American". Some one hundred Nisei women volunteered for the WAC (Women's Army Corps), where, after undergoing rigorous basic training, they had assignments as typists, clerks, and drivers. A smaller number of women also volunteered to serve as nurses for the ANC (Army Nurse Corps). Satoshi Ito, an incarceration camp inmate, reinforces the idea of the immigrants' children striving to demonstrate their patriotism to the United States. He notes that his mother would tell him, "'you're here in the United States, you need to do well in school, you need to prepare yourself to get a good job when you get out into the larger society'". He said she would tell him, "'don't be a dumb farmer like me, like us'" to encourage Ito to successfully assimilate into American society. As a result, he worked exceptionally hard to excel in school and later became a professor at the College of William & Mary. His story, along with the countless Japanese Americans willing to risk their lives in war, demonstrate the lengths many in their community went to prove their American patriotism.

=== Other concentration camps ===
As early as September 1931, after the Japanese invasion of Manchuria, US officials began to compile lists of individuals, lists which were particularly focused on the Issei. This data was eventually included in the Custodial Detention index (CDI). Agents in the Department of Justice's Special Defense Unit classified the subjects into three groups: A, B, and C, with A being the "most dangerous", and C being "possibly dangerous".

After the attack on Pearl Harbor, Roosevelt authorized his attorney general to put into motion a plan for the arrest of thousands of individuals whose names were on the potential enemy alien lists. Most of these individuals were Japanese American community leaders. Armed with a blanket arrest warrant, the FBI seized these men on the eve of December 8, 1941. These men were held in municipal jails and prisons until they were moved to Department of Justice detention camps, these camps were separate from the camps which were operated by the Wartime Relocation Authority (WRA). These camps were operated under far more stringent conditions and they were also patrolled by heightened criminal-style guards, despite the absence of criminal proceedings. Memoirs about the camps include those by Keiho Soga and Toru Matsumoto.

Crystal City, Texas, was one such camp where Japanese Americans, German Americans, and Italian Americans were interned along with a large number of Axis-descended nationals who were seized from several Latin-American countries by the U.S.

The Canadian government also confined its citizens with Japanese ancestry during World War II (see Internment of Japanese Canadians), for many reasons which were also based on fear and prejudice. Some Latin American countries on the Pacific Coast, such as Peru, interned ethnic Japanese or sent them to the United States for incarceration. Brazil also imposed restrictions on its ethnic Japanese population.

=== Hawaii ===
Although Japanese Americans in Hawaii comprised more than one-third of Hawaii's entire population, businessmen prevented their incarceration or deportation to the concentration camps which were located on the mainland because they recognized their contributions to Hawaii's economy. In the hysteria of the time, some mainland Congressmen (Hawaii was only an incorporated U.S. territory at the time, and despite being fully part of the U.S., did not have a voting representative or senator in Congress) promoted that all Japanese Americans and Japanese immigrants should be removed from Hawaii but were unsuccessful. An estimated 1,200 to 1,800 Japanese nationals and American-born Japanese from Hawaii were interned or incarcerated, either in five camps on the islands or in one of the mainland concentration camps, but this represented well-under two percent of the total Japanese American residents in the islands. "No serious explanations were offered as to why ... the internment of individuals of Japanese descent was necessary on the mainland, but not in Hawaii, where the large Japanese-Hawaiian population went largely unmolested."

The vast majority of Japanese Americans and their immigrant parents in Hawaii were not incarcerated because the government had already declared martial law in Hawaii, a legal measure which allowed it to significantly reduce the supposed risks of espionage and sabotage by residents of Hawaii who had Japanese ancestry. Also, Japanese Americans comprised over 35% of the territory's entire population: they numbered 157,905 out of a total population of 423,330 at the time of the 1940 census, making them the largest ethnic group at that time; detaining so many people would have been enormously challenging in terms of logistics. Additionally, the whole of Hawaiian society was dependent on their productivity. According to intelligence reports which were published at the time, "the Japanese, through a concentration of effort in select industries, had achieved a virtual stranglehold on several key sectors of the economy in Hawaii," and they "had access to virtually all jobs in the economy, including high-status, high-paying jobs (e.g., professional and managerial jobs)". To imprison such a large percentage of the islands' work force would have crippled the Hawaiian economy. Thus, the unfounded fear of Japanese Americans turning against the United States was overcome by the reality-based fear of massive economic loss.

Despite the financial and logistical obstacles, President Roosevelt persisted for quite some time in urging incarceration of Japanese Americans in Hawaii. As late as February 26, 1942, he informed Secretary of the Navy Knox that he had "long felt that most of the Japanese should be removed from Oahu to one of the other Islands." While Roosevelt conceded that such an undertaking involved "much planning, much temporary construction, and careful supervision of them when they get to the new location," he did not "worry about the constitutional question—first, because of my recent order and, second, because Hawaii is under martial law." He called for Knox to work with Stimson and "go ahead and do it as a military project." Eventually, he too gave up the project.

Lieutenant General Delos C. Emmons, the commander of the Hawaii Department, promised that the local Japanese American community would be treated fairly as long as it remained loyal to the United States. He succeeded in blocking efforts to relocate it to the outer islands or the mainland by pointing out the logistical difficulties of such a move. Among the small number incarcerated were community leaders and prominent politicians, including territorial legislators Thomas Sakakihara and Sanji Abe.

Five concentration camps were operated in the territory of Hawaii, referred to as the "Hawaiian Island Detention Camps". One camp was located on Sand Island, at the mouth of Honolulu Harbor. This camp was constructed before the outbreak of the war. All of the prisoners who were held there were "detained under military custody... because of the imposition of martial law throughout the Islands". It was replaced by the Honouliuli Internment Camp, near Ewa, on the southwestern shore of Oahu in 1943. Another was located in Haiku, Maui, in addition to the Kilauea Detention Center on Hawaii and Camp Kalaheo on Kauai.

=== Japanese Latin Americans ===
During World War II, over 2,200 Japanese from Latin America were held in concentration camps run by the Immigration and Naturalization Service, part of the Department of Justice. Beginning in 1942, Latin Americans of Japanese ancestry were rounded up and transported to American concentration camps run by the INS and the U.S. Justice Department. Most of these internees, approximately 1,800, came from Peru. An additional 250 were from Panama, Bolivia, Colombia, Costa Rica, Cuba, Ecuador, El Salvador, Mexico, Nicaragua, and Venezuela.

The first group of Japanese Latin Americans arrived in San Francisco on April 20, 1942, on board the Etolin along with 360 ethnic Germans and 14 ethnic Italians from Peru, Ecuador, and Colombia. The 151 men — ten from Ecuador, the rest from Peru — had volunteered for deportation believing they were to be repatriated to Japan. They were denied visas by U.S. Immigration authorities and then detained on the grounds they had tried to enter the country illegally, without a visa or passport. Subsequent transports brought additional "volunteers", including the wives and children of men who had been deported earlier. A total of 2,264 Japanese Latin Americans, about two-thirds of them from Peru, were interned in facilities on the U.S. mainland during the war.

The United States originally intended to trade these Latin American internees as part of a hostage exchange program with Japan and other Axis nations; at least one trade occurred. Over 1,300 persons of Japanese ancestry were exchanged for a like number of non-official Americans in October 1943, at the port of Marmagao, India. Over half were Japanese Latin Americans (the rest being ethnic Germans and Italians) and of that number one-third were Japanese Peruvians.

On September 2, 1943, the Swedish ship MS Gripsholm departed the U.S. with just over 1,300 Japanese nationals (including nearly a hundred from Canada and Mexico) en route for the exchange location, Marmagao, the main port of the Portuguese colony of Goa on the west coast of India. After two more stops in South America to take on additional Japanese nationals, the passenger manifest reached 1,340. Of that number, Latin American Japanese numbered 55 percent of the Gripsholm's travelers, 30 percent of whom were Japanese Peruvian. Arriving in Marmagao on October 16, 1943, the Gripsholm's passengers disembarked and then boarded the Japanese ship Teia Maru. In return, "non-official" Americans (secretaries, butlers, cooks, embassy staff workers, etc.) previously held by the Japanese Army boarded the Gripsholm while the Teia Maru headed for Tokyo. Because this exchange was done with those of Japanese ancestry officially described as "volunteering" to return to Japan, no legal challenges were encountered. The U.S. Department of State was pleased with the first trade and immediately began to arrange a second exchange of non-officials for February 1944. This exchange would involve 1,500 non-volunteer Japanese who were to be exchanged for 1,500 Americans. The US was busy with Pacific Naval activity and future trading plans stalled. Further slowing the program were legal and political "turf" battles between the State Department, the Roosevelt administration, and the DOJ, whose officials were not convinced of the legality of the program.

The completed October 1943 trade took place at the height of the Enemy Alien Deportation Program. Japanese Peruvians were still being "rounded up" for shipment to the U.S. in previously unseen numbers. Despite logistical challenges facing the floundering prisoner exchange program, deportation plans were moving ahead. This is partly explained by an early-in-the-war revelation of the overall goal for Latin Americans of Japanese ancestry under the Enemy Alien Deportation Program. Secretary of State Cordell Hull wrote to an agreeing President Roosevelt, "[that the US must] continue our efforts to remove all the Japanese from these American Republics for internment in the United States."

"Native" Peruvians expressed extreme animosity toward their Japanese citizens and expatriates, and Peru refused to accept the post-war return of Japanese Peruvians from the US. Although a small number asserting special circumstances, such as marriage to a non-Japanese Peruvian, did return, the majority were trapped. Their home country refused to take them back (a political stance Peru maintained until 1950), they were generally Spanish speakers in the Anglo US, and in the postwar U.S., the Department of State started expatriating them to Japan. Civil rights attorney Wayne Collins filed injunctions on behalf of the remaining internees, helping them obtain "parole" relocation to the labor-starved Seabrook Farms in New Jersey. He started a legal battle that was not resolved until 1953, when, after working as undocumented immigrants for almost ten years, those Japanese Peruvians remaining in the U.S. were finally offered citizenship.

== Impact of camps on internees ==
During the Japanese American Internment, roughly one-third of the internees were first-generation (issei) who immigrated from Japan, while two-thirds of them were second-generation (nisei), American-born and citizens of the United States. Many of these second-generation internees had never been to Japan and spoke English as their first language. Detainees created organizations, such as the George Igawa Orchestra, in order to make conditions at the camps more tolerable.

The children who stayed in the camp reported experiencing long-lasting emotional turmoil and feelings of abandonment after they were released. One of the internees, Richard Tatsuno Nagaoka, said, "I used to feel so ashamed to be Japanese that somehow, I envisioned as a child that I was responsible for World War II…I would have done anything not to go to school… And so I tried as best as I could to be invisible because I knew I was going to get heckled, and I was going to be chased around the yard. I knew there were going to be insults thrown and I was begging some higher power just to lift me out of here." Dr. Satsuki Ina states that "This is where the seed of self-hatred starts because in a child’s mind, if someone is abusing you, abandoning you, the self-centered cognitive process of a child is that, I’m the cause." Many of the victims of the internment camps experienced further discrimination after their release Some internees like Marion Kanemoto, whose father was taken by the FBI when she was fourteen, were transported back to Japan as a part of prisoner-of-war swap.

Japanese Americans were detained without due process or court hearings. In 1944's Korematsu v. United States, Fred Korematsu was denied his appeal to the Supreme Court and convicted through military order, without any direct evidence that he was disloyal to the United States.

== Incarceration ends ==
On December 18, 1944, the Supreme Court handed down two decisions on the legality of the incarceration under Executive Order 9066. Korematsu v. United States, a 6–3 decision upholding a Nisei's conviction for violating the military exclusion order, stated that, in general, the removal of Japanese Americans from the West Coast was constitutional. However, Ex parte Endo unanimously declared on that same day that loyal citizens of the United States, regardless of cultural descent, could not be detained without cause. In effect, the two rulings held that, while the eviction of American citizens in the name of military necessity was legal, the subsequent incarceration was not—thus paving the way for their release.

Having been alerted to the Court's decision, the Roosevelt administration issued Public Proclamation No. 21 the day before the Korematsu and Endo rulings were made public, on December 17, 1944, rescinding the exclusion orders and declaring that Japanese Americans could return to the West Coast the next month.

Although War Relocation Authority (WRA) Director Dillon Myer and others had pushed for an earlier end to the incarceration, the Japanese Americans were not allowed to return to the West Coast until January 2, 1945, after the November 1944 election, so as not to impede Roosevelt's reelection campaign. Many younger detainees had already been sent to Midwest or Eastern cities to pursue work or educational opportunities. For example, 20,000 were sent to Lake View, Chicago. The remaining population began to leave the camps to try to rebuild their lives at home. Former inmates were given $25 and a train ticket to wherever they wanted to go, but many had little or nothing to return to, having lost their homes and businesses. When Japanese Americans were sent to the camps they could only take a few items with them and while incarcerated could only work for menial jobs with a small monthly salary of $12–$19. When incarceration ended, they therefore had few savings to survive on. Some emigrated to Japan, although many of these were repatriated against their will. The camps remained open for residents who were not ready to return (mostly elderly Issei and families with young children), but the WRA pressured stragglers to leave by gradually eliminating services in camp. Those who had not left by each camp's close date were forcibly removed and sent back to the West Coast.

Nine of the ten WRA camps were shut down by the end of 1945, although Tule Lake, which held "renunciants" slated for deportation to Japan, was not closed until March 20, 1946. Japanese Latin Americans brought to the U.S. from Peru and other countries, who were still being held in the DOJ camps at Santa Fe and Crystal City, took legal action in April 1946 in an attempt to avoid deportation to Japan.

== Aftermath ==
=== Hardship and material loss ===
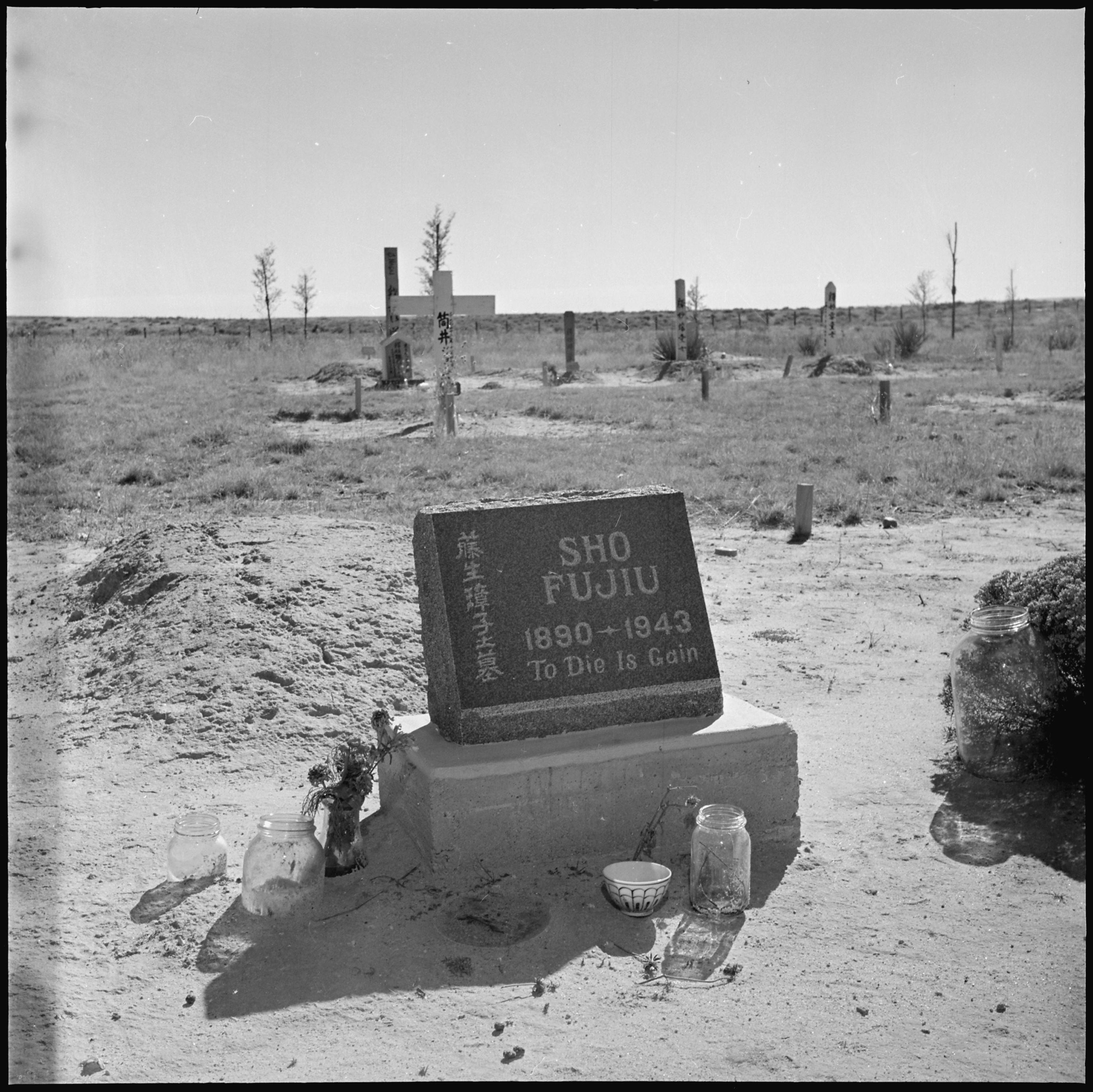
Graveyard at the Granada Relocation Center in Amache, Colorado

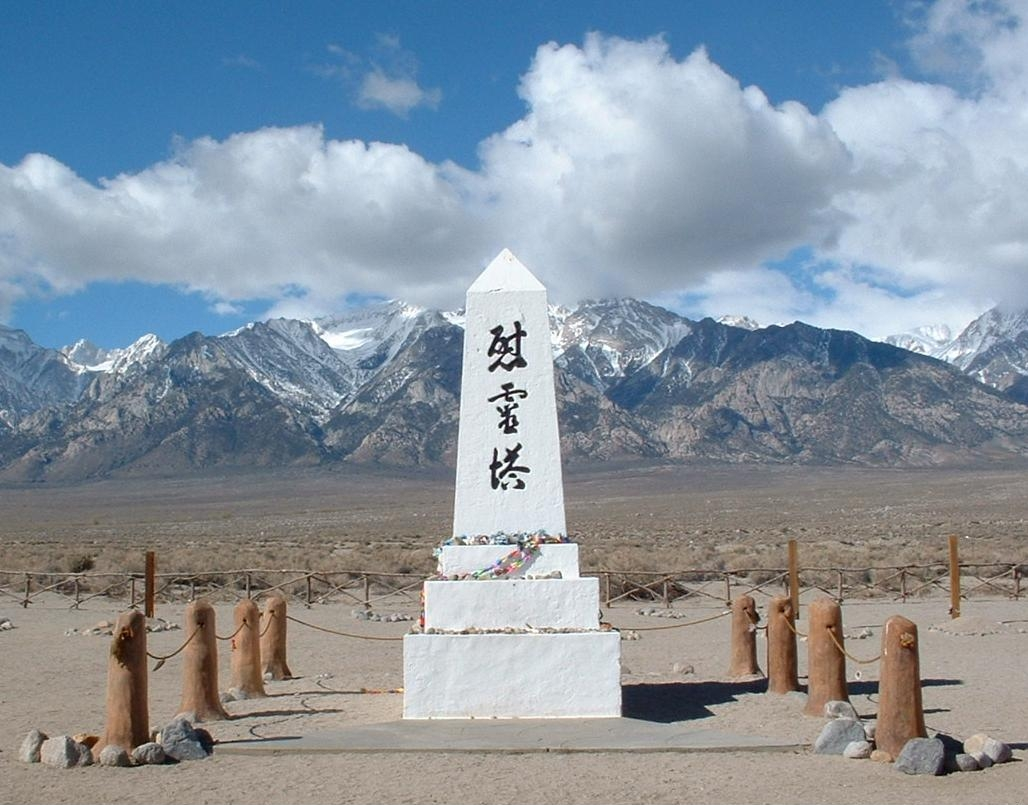
A monument at Manzanar, "to console the souls of the dead"

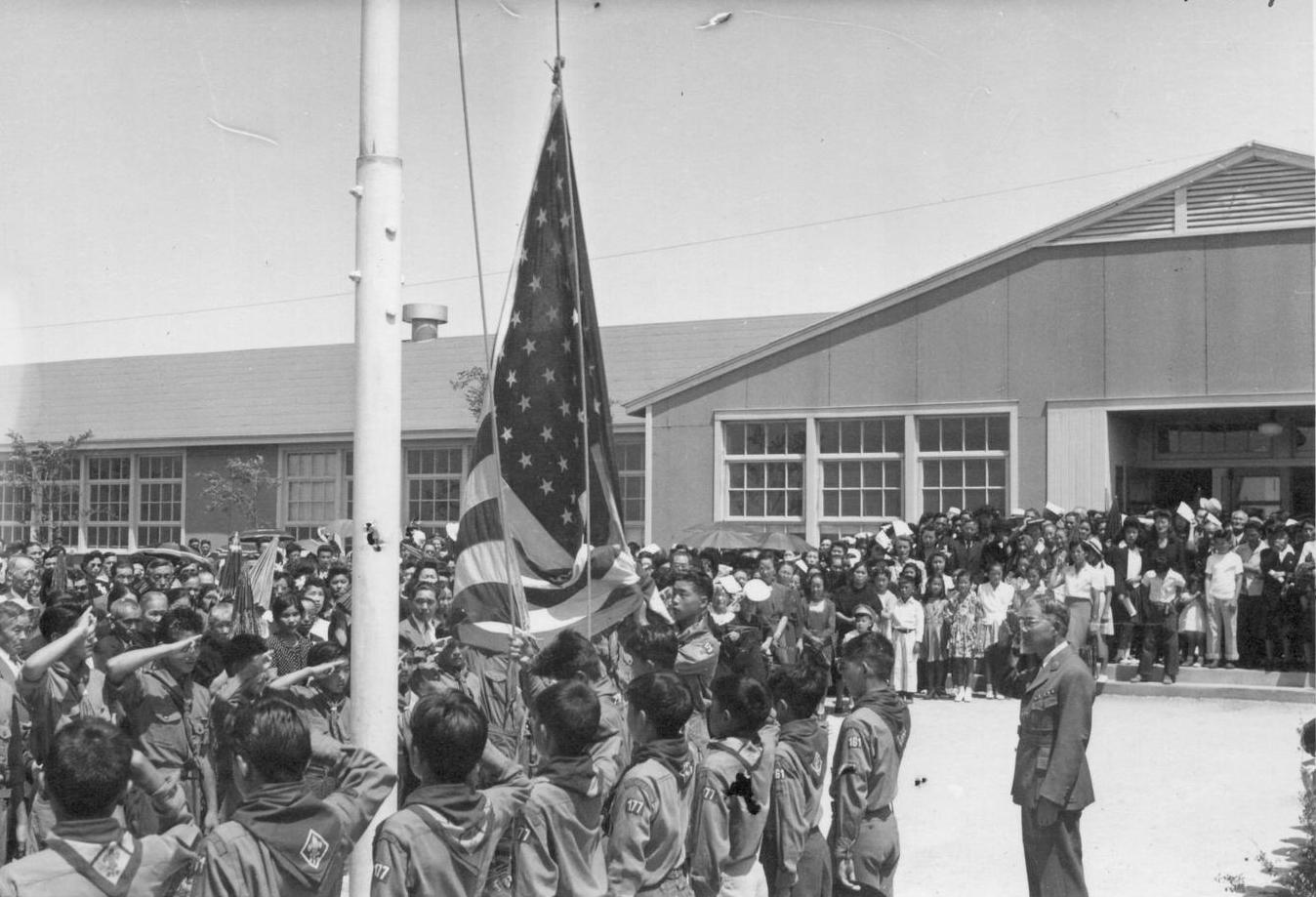
Boy Scouts at the Granada War Relocation Center raise the flag to half-staff during a memorial service for the first six Nisei soldiers from this Center who were killed in action in Italy. The service was attended by 1,500 Amache internees. August 5, 1944.

Many detainees lost irreplaceable personal property due to restrictions that prohibited them from taking more than they could carry into the camps. These losses were compounded by theft and destruction of items placed in governmental storage. Leading up to their incarceration, Nikkei were prohibited from leaving the Military Zones or traveling more than 5 miles (8.0 km) from home, forcing those who had to travel for work, like truck farmers and residents of rural towns, to quit their jobs. Many others were simply fired for their Japanese heritage.

Many Japanese Americans encountered continued housing injustice after the war. Alien land laws in California, Oregon, and Washington barred the Issei from owning their pre-war homes and farms. Many had cultivated land for decades as tenant farmers, but they lost their rights to farm those lands when they were forced to leave. Other Issei (and Nisei who were renting or had not completed payments on their property) had found families willing to occupy their homes or tend their farms during their incarceration. However, those unable to strike a deal with caretakers had to sell their property, often in a matter of days and at great financial loss to predatory land speculators, who made huge profits.

In addition to these monetary and property losses, there were seven who were shot and killed by sentries: Kanesaburo Oshima, 58, during an escape attempt from Fort Sill, Oklahoma; Toshio Kobata, 58, and Hirota Isomura, 59, during transfer to Lordsburg, New Mexico; James Ito, 17, and Katsuji James Kanegawa, 21, during the December 1942 Manzanar Riot; James Hatsuaki Wakasa, 65, while walking near the perimeter wire of Topaz; and Shoichi James Okamoto, 30, during a verbal altercation with a sentry at the Tule Lake Segregation Center.

Hatano Farm is located south of Los Angeles. It was shut down in 2022 by city officials, but recently gained status as a point of historical interest by vote from the California State Resources Commission. Upon returning from incarceration, U.S. Army veteran James Hatano settled and began to grow flowers. His land was located in Rancho Palos Verdes and was acquired through a federal lease in 1953.

Psychological injury was observed by Dillon S. Myer, director of the WRA camps. In June 1945, Myer described how the Japanese Americans had grown increasingly depressed and overcome with feelings of helplessness and personal insecurity. Author Betty Furuta explains that the Japanese used gaman, loosely meaning "perseverance", to overcome hardships; this was mistaken by non-Japanese as being introverted and lacking initiative.

Japanese Americans also encountered hostility and even violence when they returned to the West Coast. Concentrated largely in rural areas of Central California, there were dozens of reports of gunshots, fires, and explosions aimed at Japanese American homes, businesses, and places of worship, in addition to non-violent crimes like vandalism and the defacing of Japanese graves. In one of the few cases that went to trial, four men were accused of attacking the Doi family of Placer County, California, setting off an explosion, and starting a fire on the family's farm in January 1945. Despite a confession from one of the men that implicated the others, the jury accepted their defense attorney's framing of the attack as a justifiable attempt to keep California "a white man's country" and acquitted all four defendants.

To compensate former detainees for their property losses, Congress passed the Japanese-American Claims Act on July 2, 1948, allowing Japanese Americans to apply for compensation for property losses which occurred as "a reasonable and natural consequence of the evacuation or exclusion". By the time the Act was passed, the IRS had already destroyed most of the detainees' 1939–42 tax records. Due to the time pressure and strict limits on how much they could take to the camps, few were able to preserve detailed tax and financial records during the evacuation process. Therefore, it was extremely difficult for claimants to establish that their claims were valid. Under the Act, Japanese American families filed 26,568 claims totaling $148 million in requests; about $37 million was approved and disbursed.

The different placement for the detainees had significant consequences for their lifetime outcomes. A 2016 study finds, using the random dispersal of detainees into camps in seven different states, that the people assigned to richer locations did better in terms of income, education, socioeconomic status, house prices, and housing quality roughly fifty years later.

=== Reparations and redress ===
Beginning in the 1960s, a younger generation of Japanese Americans, inspired by the civil rights movement, began what is known as the "Redress Movement", an effort to obtain an official apology and reparations from the federal government for incarcerating their parents and grandparents during the war. They focused not on documented property losses but on the broader injustice and mental suffering caused by the incarceration. The movement's first success was in 1976, when President Gerald Ford proclaimed that the incarceration was "wrong", and a "national mistake" which "shall never again be repeated". President Ford signed a proclamation formally terminating Executive Order 9066 and apologized for the incarceration, stating: "We now know what we should have known then—not only was that evacuation wrong but Japanese-Americans were and are loyal Americans. On the battlefield and at home the names of Japanese-Americans have been and continue to be written in history for the sacrifices and the contributions they have made to the well-being and to the security of this, our common Nation."

The campaign for redress was launched by Japanese Americans in 1978. The Japanese American Citizens League (JACL), which had cooperated with the administration during the war, became part of the movement. It asked for three measures: $25,000 to be awarded to each person who was detained, an apology from Congress acknowledging publicly that the U.S. government had been wrong, and the release of funds to set up an educational foundation for the children of Japanese American families.

In 1980, under the Carter administration, Congress established the Commission on Wartime Relocation and Internment of Civilians (CWRIC) to study the matter. On February 24, 1983, the commission issued a report entitled Personal Justice Denied, condemning the incarceration as unjust and motivated by racism and xenophobic ideas rather than factual military necessity. Concentration camp survivors sued the federal government for $24 million in property loss, but lost the case. However, the Commission recommended that $20,000 in reparations be paid to those Japanese Americans who had suffered incarceration.

The Civil Liberties Act of 1988 exemplified the Japanese American redress movement that impacted the large debate about the reparation bill. There was question over whether the bill would pass during the 1980s due to the poor state of the federal budget and the low support of Japanese Americans covering 1% of the United States. However, four powerful Japanese American Democrats and Republicans who had war experience, with the support of Democratic congressmen Barney Frank, sponsored the bill and pushed for its passage as their top priority.

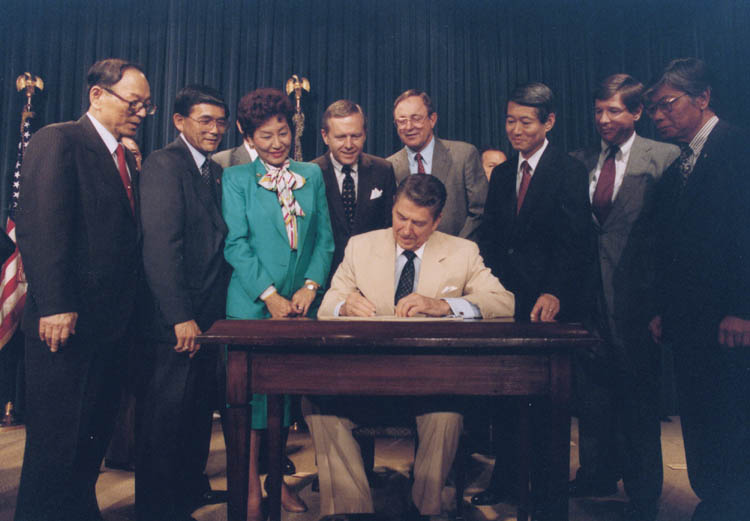
U.S. President Ronald Reagan signs the Civil Liberties Act of 1988 in August 1988, which granted reparations for the incarceration of Japanese Americans

On August 10, 1988, U.S. President Ronald Reagan signed the Civil Liberties Act of 1988, which had been sponsored by several representatives including Barney Frank, Norman Mineta, and Bob Matsui in the House and by Spark Matsunaga who got 75 co-sponsors in the Senate, provided financial redress of $20,000 for each former detainee who was still alive when the act was passed, totaling $1.2 billion. The question of to whom reparations should be given, how much, and even whether monetary reparations were appropriate were subjects of sometimes contentious debate within the Japanese American community and Congress.

On September 27, 1992, the Civil Liberties Act Amendments of 1992, appropriating an additional $400 million to ensure all remaining detainees received their $20,000 redress payments, was signed into law by President George H. W. Bush. He issued another formal apology from the U.S. government on December 7, 1991, on the 50th anniversary of the Pearl Harbor attack, saying:

In remembering, it is important to come to grips with the past. No nation can fully understand itself or find its place in the world if it does not look with clear eyes at all the glories and disgraces of its past. We in the United States acknowledge such an injustice in our history. The internment of Americans of Japanese ancestry was a great injustice, and it will never be repeated.

Over 81,800 people qualified by 1998 and $1.6 billion was distributed among them.

Under the 2001 budget of the United States, Congress authorized the preservation of ten detention sites as historical landmarks: "places like Manzanar, Tule Lake, Heart Mountain, Topaz, Amache, Jerome, and Rohwer will forever stand as reminders that this nation failed in its most sacred duty to protect its citizens against prejudice, greed, and political expediency".

President Bill Clinton awarded the Presidential Medal of Freedom, the highest civilian honor in the United States, to Korematsu in 1998, saying, "In the long history of our country's constant search for justice, some names of ordinary citizens stand for millions of souls: Plessy, Brown, Parks ... to that distinguished list, today we add the name of Fred Korematsu." That year, Korematsu served as the grand marshal of San Francisco's annual Cherry Blossom Festival parade. On January 30, 2011, California first observed an annual "Fred Korematsu Day of Civil Liberties and the Constitution", the first such ceremony ever to be held in commemoration of an Asian American in the United States. On June 14, 2011, Peruvian President Alan García apologized for his country's internment of Japanese immigrants during World War II, most of whom were transferred to the U.S.

=== Social impact and legacy ===
After the war, and once the process of internment came to its conclusion, Japanese Americans became socially affected by the war and their experiences of United States government policy. Japanese Americans rejected their racial identity as a prerequisite to various organizations that had existed prior to their internment, in order to assimilate back into American society, with both the Japanese Association and the Japanese Chamber of Commerce slipping into non-existence in the post-war years. The distancing of Japanese Americans from any collective, racially labelled establishments was something they saw necessary in order to preserve their status in the United States in the wake of their experiences.

In addition, Japanese Americans were also impacted socially by a changing religious structure in which ethnic churches were terminated, with church membership dropping from 25% of the Japanese American population in 1942, to 6% in 1962.

== Terminology debate ==
=== Misuse of the term "internment" ===
The legal term "internment" has been used in regards to the mass incarceration of Japanese Americans. This term, however, derives from international conventions regarding the treatment of enemy nationals during wartime and specifically limits internment to those (noncitizen) enemy nationals who threaten the security of the detaining power. The internment of selected enemy alien belligerents, as opposed to mass incarceration, is legal both under US and international law. UCLA Asian American studies professor Lane Hirabayashi pointed out that the history of the term internment, to mean the arrest and holding of non-citizens, could only be correctly applied to Issei, Japanese people who were not legal citizens. These people were a minority during Japanese incarceration and thus Roger Daniels, emeritus professor of history at the University of Cincinnati, has concluded that this terminology is wrongfully used by any government that wishes to include groups other than the Issei.

On April 22, 2022, the Associated Press edited its entry for Japanese internment, changing the entry heading to Japanese internment, incarceration, and adding the following wording:

Though internment has been applied historically to all detainments of Japanese Americans and Japanese nationals during World War II, the broader use of the term is inaccurate—about two-thirds of those who were relocated were US citizens, and thus could not be considered interns—and many Japanese-Americans find it objectionable.

It is better to say that they were incarcerated or detained and to define the larger event as the incarceration of Japanese Americans.

=== Terms which were used ===
During World War II, government officials and the press referred to the camps as relocation centers and concentration camps. Roosevelt himself referred to the camps as concentration camps on different occasions, including at a press conference held on October 20, 1942. In 1943, his attorney general Francis Biddle lamented that "The present practice of keeping loyal American citizens in concentration camps for longer than is necessary is dangerous and repugnant to the principles of our government."

Following World War II, other government officials made statements in which they suggested that the use of the term "relocation center" was largely euphemistic. In 1946, former Secretary of the Interior Harold Ickes wrote "We gave the fancy name of 'relocation centers' to these dust bowls, but they were concentration camps nonetheless." In a 1961 interview, Harry S. Truman stated "They were concentration camps. They called it relocation but they put them in concentration camps, and I was against it. We were in a period of emergency, but it was still the wrong thing to do."

In subsequent decades, debate has arisen over the terminology which has been used in reference to camps in which Americans of Japanese ancestry and their immigrant parents, were incarcerated by the US government during the war. These camps have been referred to as "war relocation centers", "relocation camps", "relocation centers", "internment camps", and "concentration camps", and the controversy over which term is the most accurate and appropriate continues.

=== Towards a consensus ===
In 1998, the use of the term "concentration camps" gained greater credibility prior to the opening of an exhibit about the American camps at Ellis Island. Initially, the American Jewish Committee (AJC) and the National Park Service, which manages Ellis Island, objected to the use of the term in the exhibit. However, during a subsequent meeting held at the offices of the AJC in New York City, leaders representing Japanese Americans and Jewish Americans reached an understanding about the use of the term.

After the meeting, the Japanese American National Museum and the AJC issued a joint statement (which was included in the exhibit) that read in part:

A concentration camp is a place where people are imprisoned not because of any crimes they have committed, but simply because of who they are. Although many groups have been singled out for such persecution throughout history, the term 'concentration camp' was first used at the turn of the [20th] century in the Spanish American and Boer Wars. During World War II, America's concentration camps were clearly distinguishable from Nazi Germany's. Nazi camps were places of torture, barbarous medical experiments and summary executions; some were extermination centers with gas chambers. Six million Jews were slaughtered in the Holocaust. Many others, including Gypsies, Poles, homosexuals and political dissidents were also victims of the Nazi concentration camps. In recent years, concentration camps have existed in the former Soviet Union, Cambodia and Bosnia. Despite differences, all had one thing in common: the people in power removed a minority group from the general population and the rest of society let it happen.

The New York Times published an unsigned editorial supporting the use of "concentration camp" in the exhibit. An article quoted Jonathan Mark, a columnist for The Jewish Week, who wrote, "Can no one else speak of slavery, gas, trains, camps? It's Jewish malpractice to monopolize pain and minimize victims." AJC Executive Director David A. Harris stated during the controversy, "We have not claimed Jewish exclusivity for the term 'concentration camps.'", while also stating "Since the Second World War, these terms have taken on a specificity and a new level of meaning that deserves protection. A certain care needs to be exercised."

Deborah Schiffrin has written that, at the opening of the exhibition, entitled "America's Concentration Camps: Remembering the Japanese-American Experience", "some Jewish groups" had been offended by the use of the term. However, Schiffrin also notes that a compromise was reached when an appropriate footnote was added to the exhibit brochure.

=== On the rejection of the use of euphemisms ===
On July 7, 2012, at its annual convention, the National Council of the Japanese American Citizens League unanimously ratified the Power of Words Handbook, calling for the use of "...truthful and accurate terms, and retiring the misleading euphemisms created by the government to cover up the denial of Constitutional and human rights, the force, oppressive conditions, and racism against 120,000 innocent people of Japanese ancestry locked up in America's World War II concentration camps." Moreover, Roosevelt himself publicly used the term "concentration camps" without any qualifiers to describe Japanese American incarceration in a press conference in November 1944.

== Comparisons ==
The incarceration of Japanese Americans has been compared to the internal deportation of Ethnically Volga German Soviet citizens from the western USSR to Soviet Central Asia. As well as the persecutions, expulsions, and dislocations of other ethnic minority groups which occurred in Europe and Asia during World War II.

== Notable individuals who were incarcerated ==
- George Takei, an American actor known for his role as Hikaru Sulu on Star Trek, was incarcerated in the Rohwer and Tule Lake concentration camps between the ages of five and eight. He reflected on these experiences in the 2019 series The Terror: Infamy. Takei also recounted his time in a concentration camp in the graphic autobiographical book They Called Us Enemy.
- Pat Morita, the American actor known for his role as Mr. Miyagi in The Karate Kid franchise, was incarcerated at Gila River with his family.
- Isamu Noguchi, a Japanese American sculptor, decided to voluntarily relocate to Poston, Arizona from New York, but eventually asked to be released because of the conditions and alienation from the Japanese American community in camp.
- Aiko Herzig-Yoshinaga, a nisei high school senior incarcerated in Manzanar, California who became a political activist for various causes, including Japanese American redress.
- Norman Y. Mineta was a U.S. Representative from San Jose, Secretary of Commerce under Clinton, and Secretary of Transportation under President George W. Bush.
- Ruth Asawa, artist and namesake of the Ruth Asawa San Francisco School of the Arts. She was incarcerated with her family at the Rowher camp in Arkansas.

== Legacy ==
=== Cultural legacy ===
==== Exhibitions and collections ====
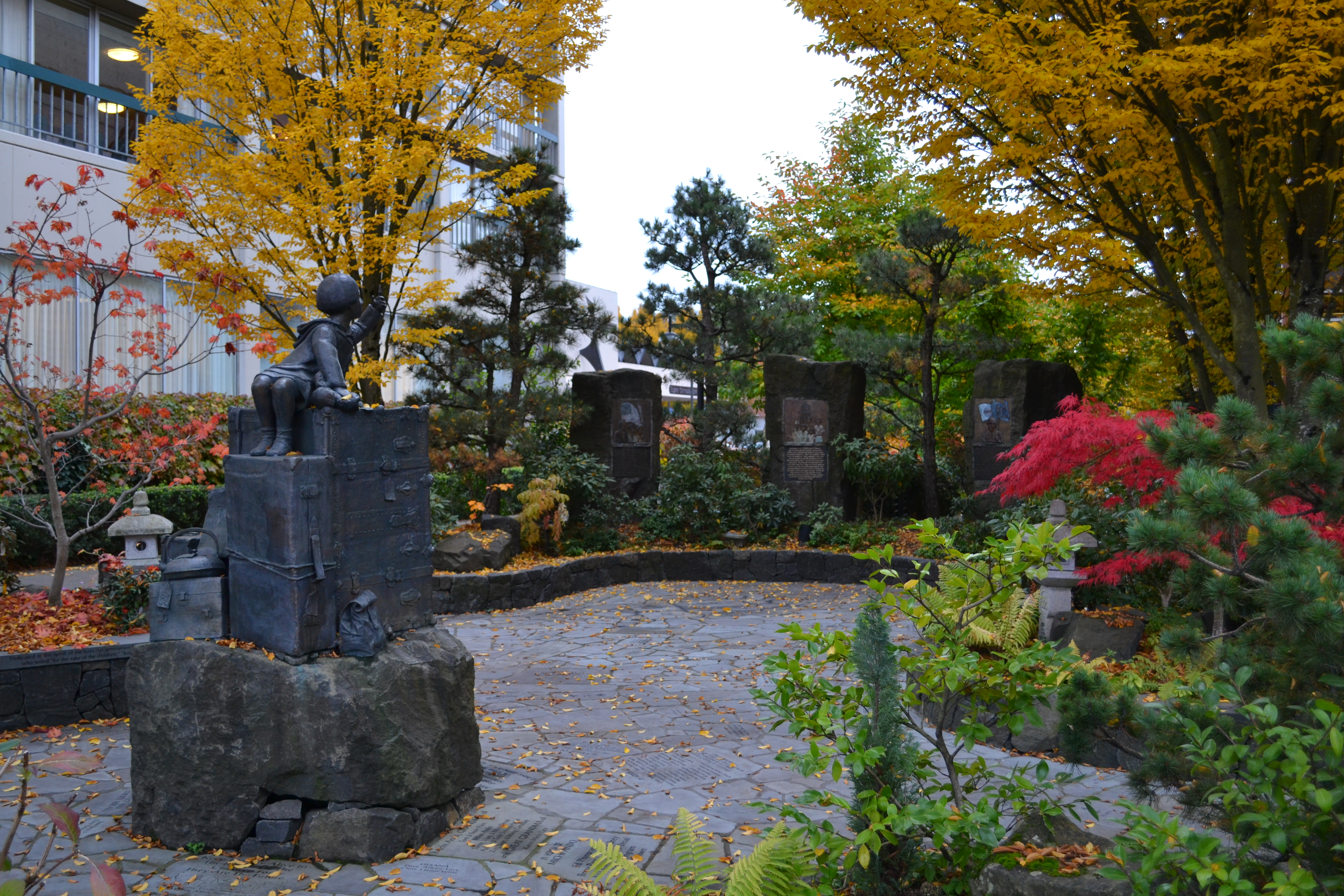
Japanese American Memorial (Eugene, Oregon)

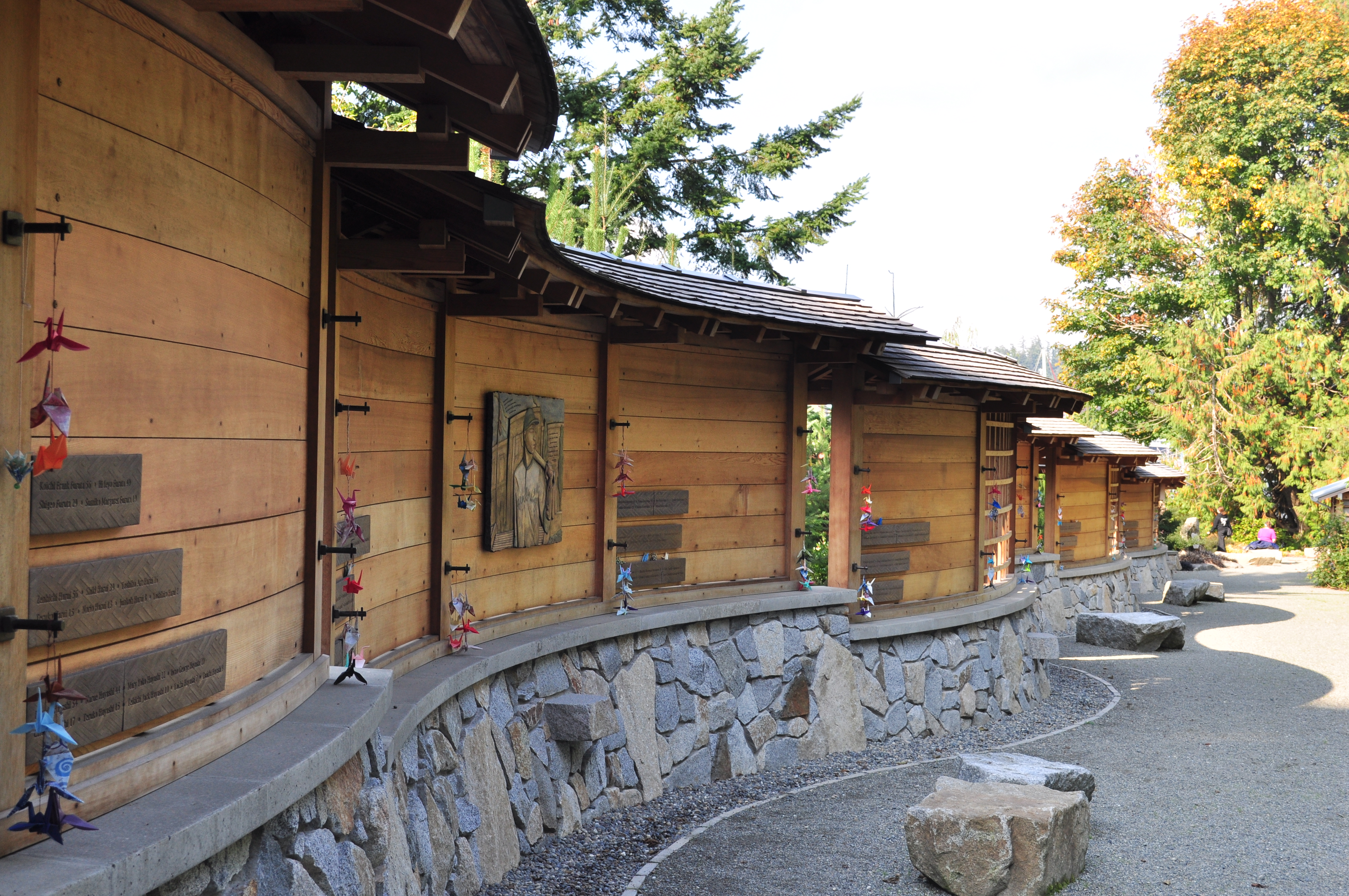
The cedar "story wall" at the Bainbridge Island Japanese American Exclusion Memorial

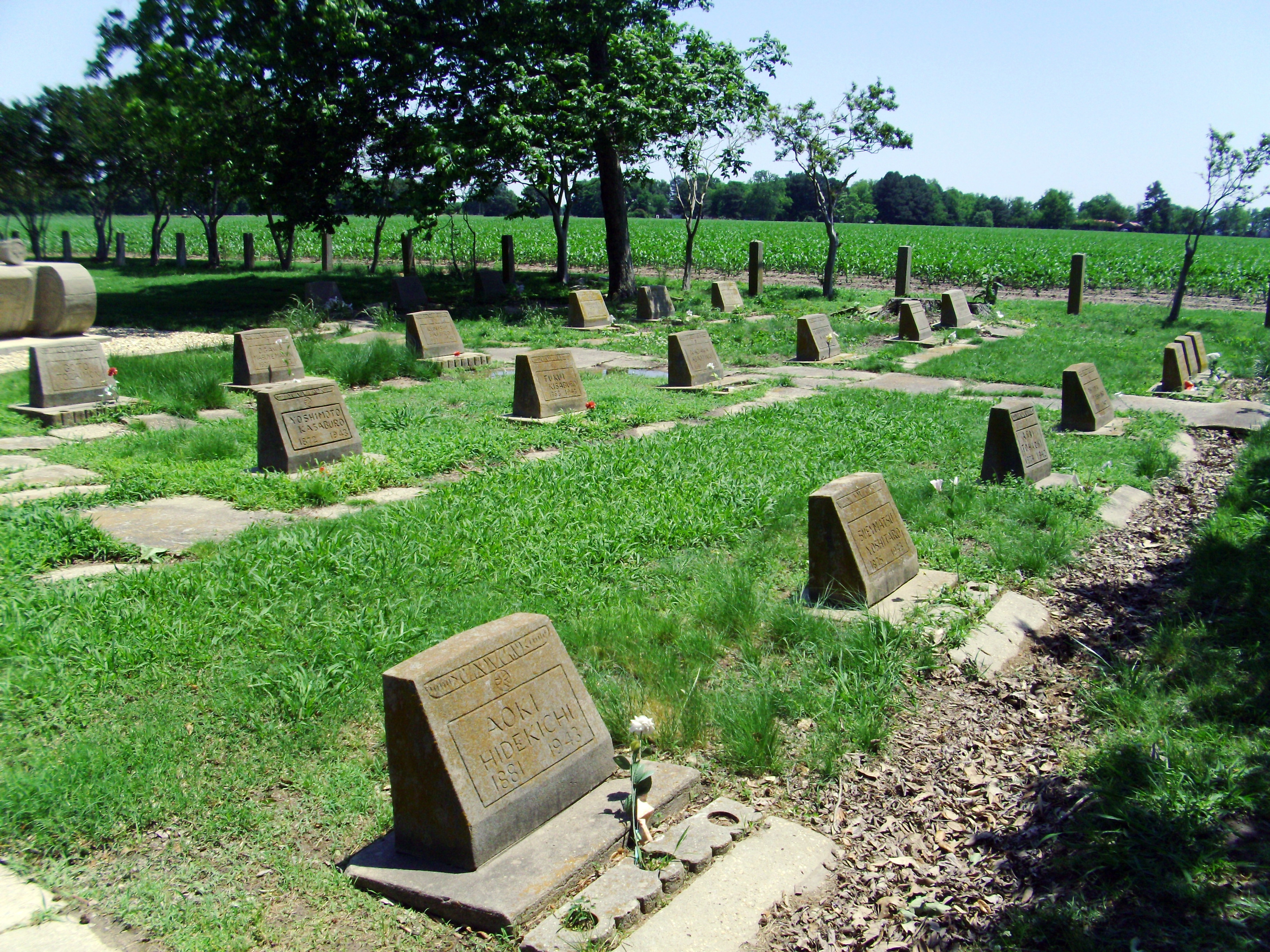
Rohwer Memorial Cemetery, declared a National Historic Landmark in 1992

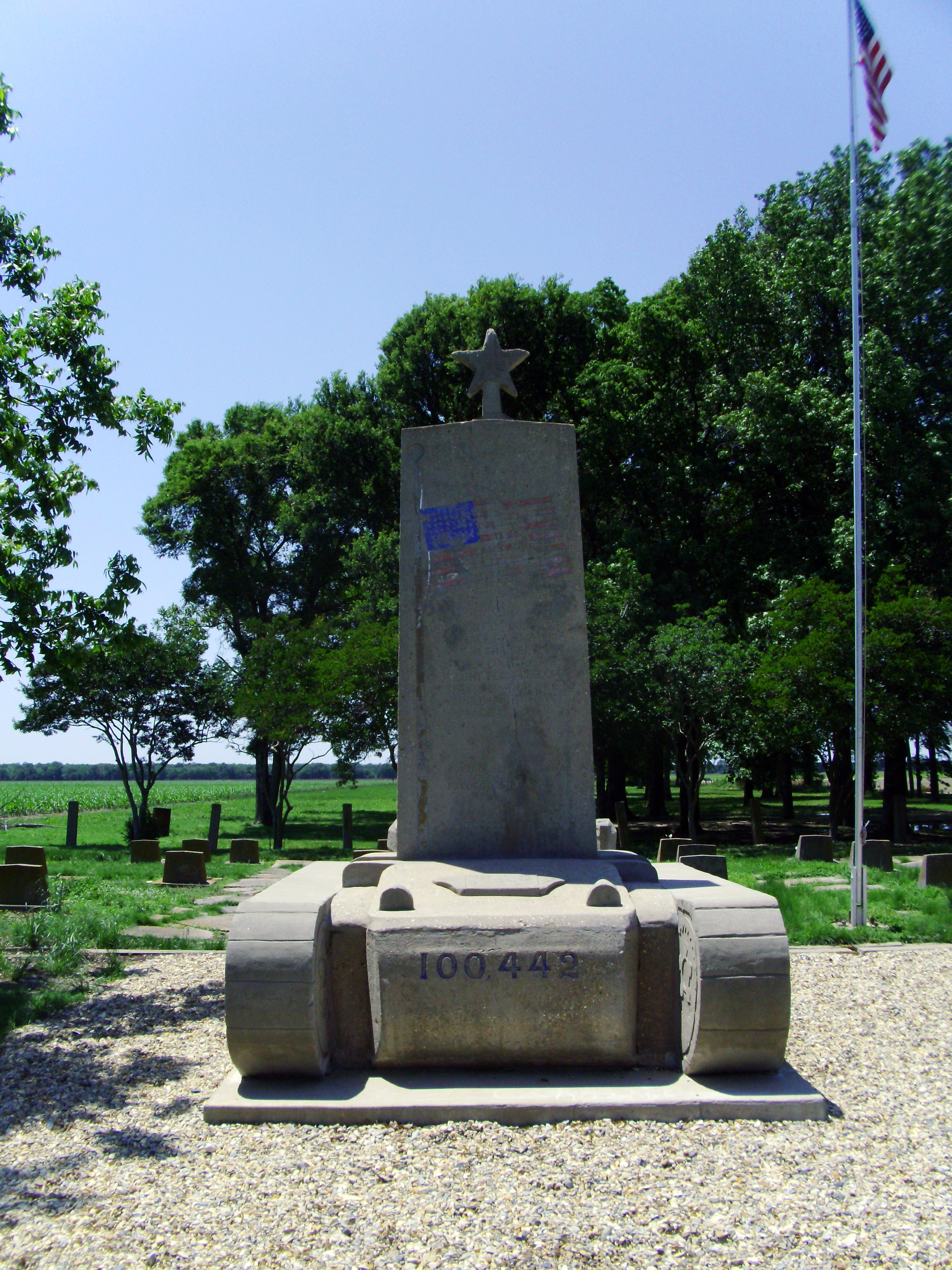
Monument to the men of the 100th Infantry Battalion/442nd Regimental Combat Team, Rohwer Memorial Cemetery

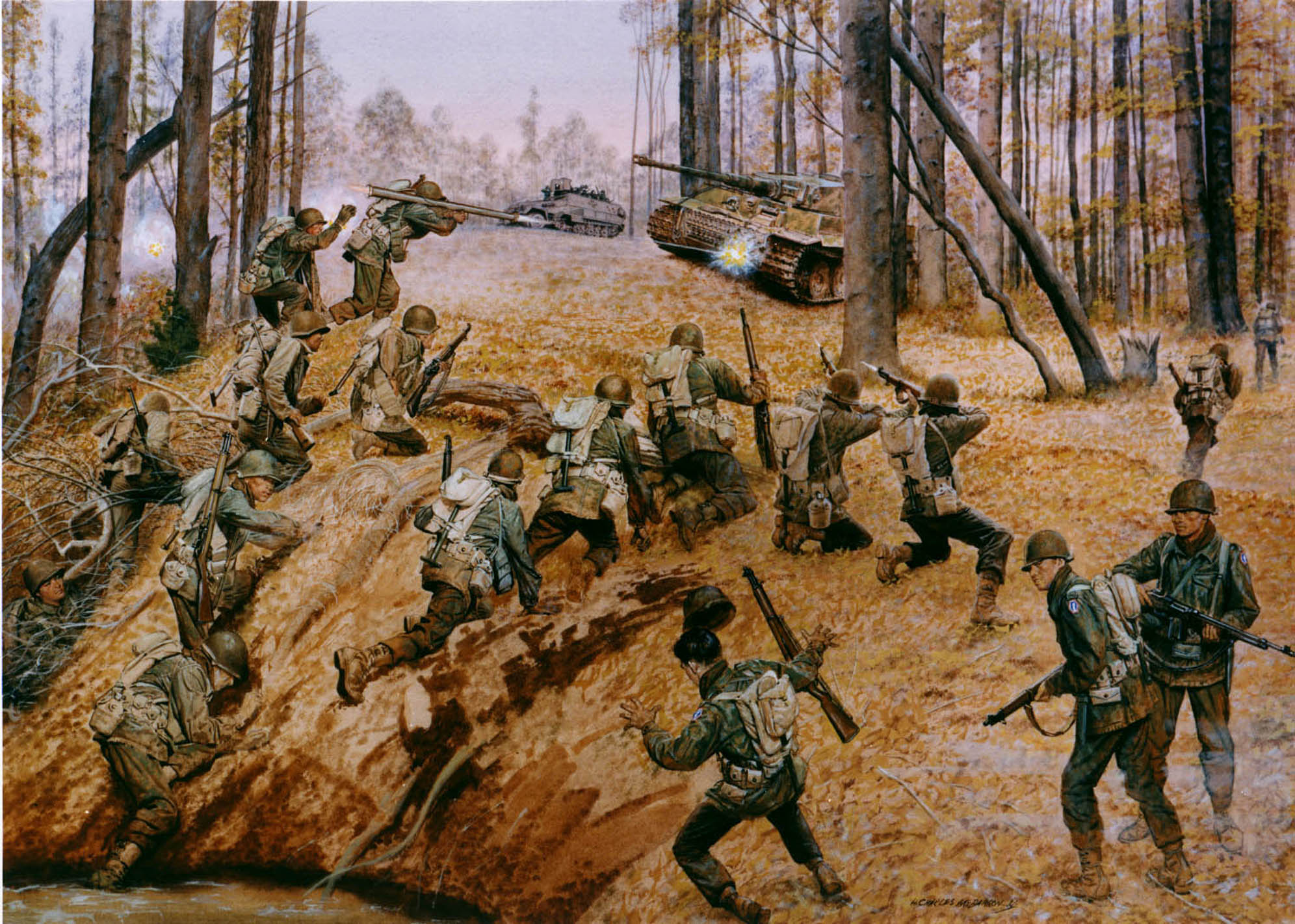
Painting by Don Troiani depicting soldiers of the 442nd Regimental Combat Team fighting in the Vosges

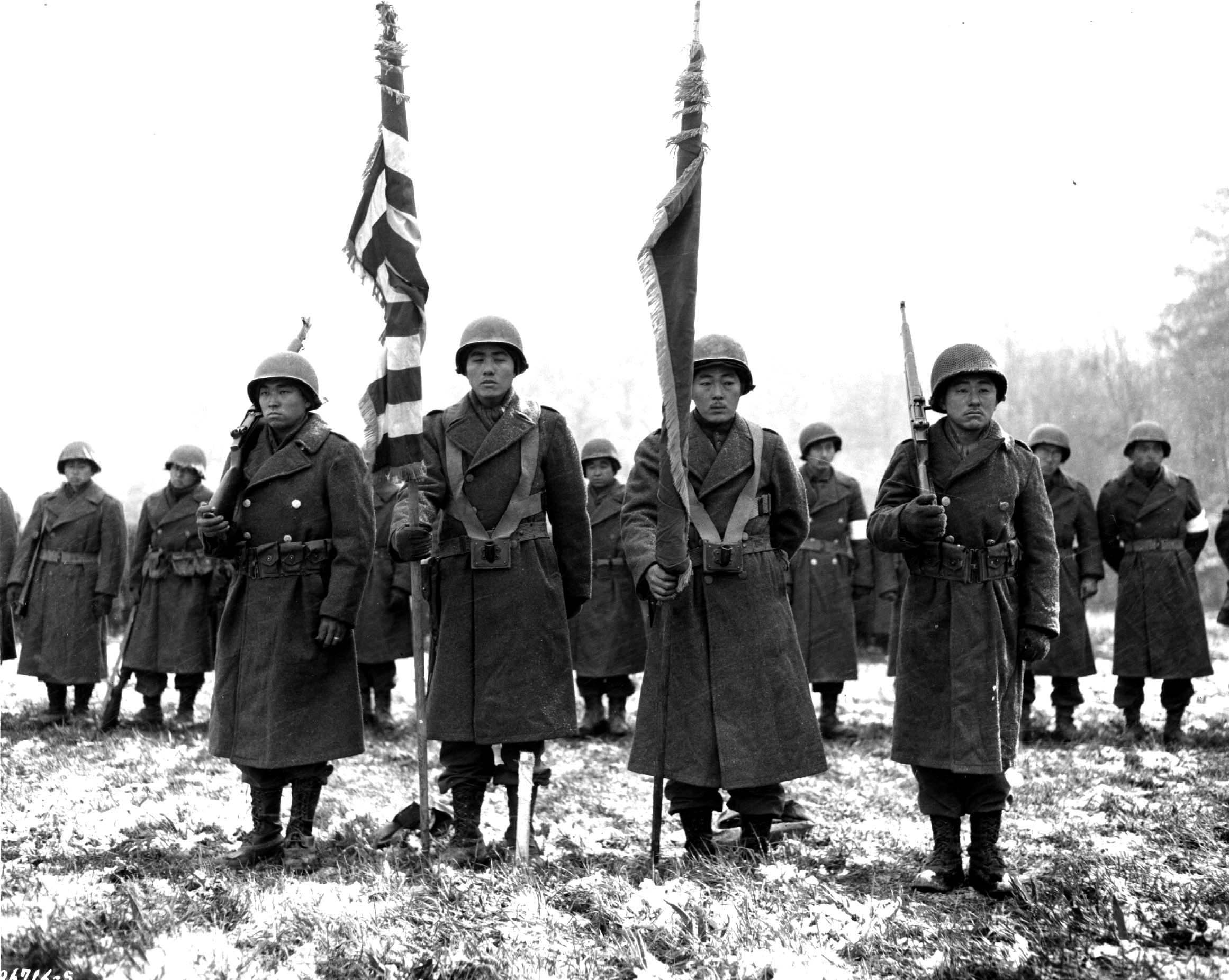
Two color guards and color bearers of the Japanese American 442nd Combat Team stand at attention while their citations are read. They are standing on the ground of Bruyeres, France, where many of their comrades fell.

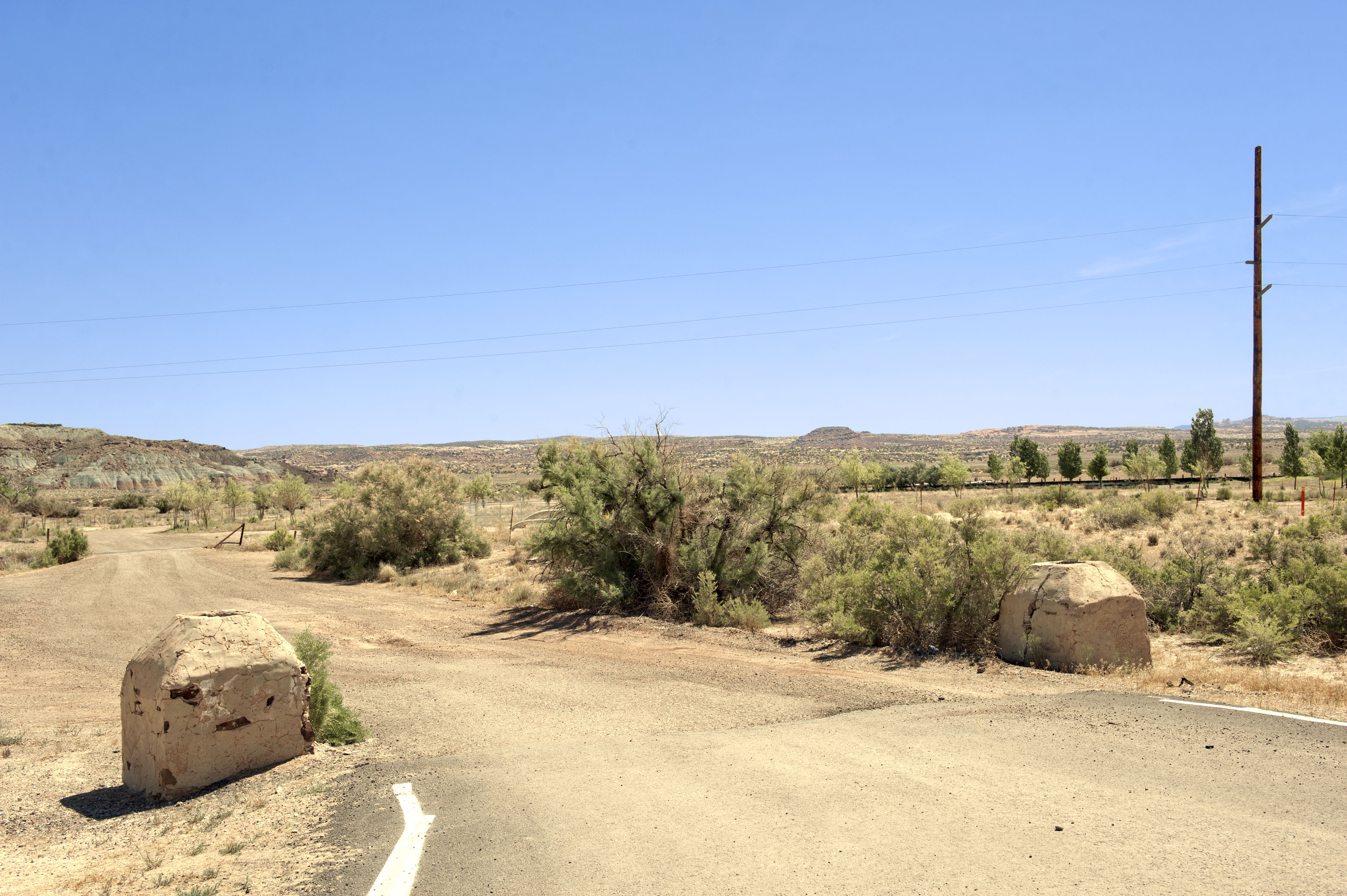
Remains of Dalton Wells, a National Register of Historic Places listing in Utah

- In 1987, the Smithsonian Institution's National Museum of American History opened an exhibition called "A More Perfect Union: Japanese Americans and the U.S. Constitution". The exhibition examined the Constitutional process by considering the experiences of Americans of Japanese ancestry before, during, and after World War II. On view were more than 1,000 artifacts and photographs relating to the experiences of Japanese Americans during World War II. The exhibition closed on January 11, 2004. On November 8, 2011, the Museum launched an online exhibition of the same name with shared archival content.
- In September 2022, the Japanese American National Museum in Los Angeles created a project in which each person with Japanese ancestry who was incarcerated in an internment camp (over 125,000 names) is displayed in a printed book of names, called the Ireichō, a website known as the Ireizō (ireizo.com), and a light sculpture called Ireihi.
- Following recognition of the injustices done to Japanese Americans, in 1992 Manzanar camp was designated a National Historic Site to "provide for the protection and interpretation of historic, cultural, and natural resources associated with the relocation of Japanese Americans during World War II" (Public Law 102-248). In 2001, the site of the Minidoka War Relocation Center in Idaho was designated the Minidoka National Historic Site. Honouliuli National Historic Site and Amache National Historic Site have also been added to the National Park System.
- The elementary school at Poston Camp Unit 1, the only surviving school complex at one of the camps and the only major surviving element of the Poston camp, was designated a National Historic Landmark District in 2012.
- On April 16, 2013, the Japanese American Internment Museum was opened in McGehee, Arkansas regarding the history of two internment camps.
- In January 2015, the Topaz Museum opened in Delta, Utah. Its stated mission is "to preserve the Topaz site and the history of the internment experience during World War II; to interpret its impact on the internees, their families, and the citizens of Millard County; and to educate the public in order to prevent a recurrence of a similar denial of American civil rights".
- On June 29, 2017, in Chicago, Illinois, the Alphawood Gallery, in partnership with the Japanese American Service Committee, opened "Then They Came for Me", the largest exhibition on Japanese American incarceration and postwar resettlement ever to open in the Midwest. This exhibit was scheduled to run until November 19, 2017.

===== Sculpture =====
Nina Akamu, a Sansei, created the sculpture entitled Golden Cranes of two red-crowned cranes, which became the center feature of the Japanese American Memorial to Patriotism During World War II. The U.S. Department of Defense described the November 9, 2000, dedication of the Memorial: "Drizzling rain was mixed with tears streaming down the faces of Japanese American World War II heroes and those who spent the war years imprisoned in isolated internment camps." Akamu's family's connection to the concentration camps based on the experience of her maternal grandfather, who was interned and later died in one such camp in Hawaii—combined with the fact that she grew up in Hawaii for a time, where she fished with her father at Pearl Harbor—and the erection of a Japanese American war memorial near her home in Massa, Italy, inspired a strong connection to the Memorial and its creation.

United States Attorney General Janet Reno also spoke at the dedication of the Memorial, where she shared a letter from President Clinton stating: "We are diminished when any American is targeted unfairly because of his or her heritage. This Memorial and the internment sites are powerful reminders that stereotyping, discrimination, hatred and racism have no place in this country."

According to the National Japanese American Memorial Foundation, the memorial:

...is symbolic not only of the Japanese American experience, but of the extrication of anyone from deeply painful and restrictive circumstances. It reminds us of the battles we've fought to overcome our ignorance and prejudice and the meaning of an integrated culture, once pained and torn, now healed and unified. Finally, the monument presents the Japanese American experience as a symbol for all peoples.

==== Films ====
Dozens of movies were filmed about and in the camps; these relate the experiences of inmates or were made by former camp inmates. Examples follow.

- The film Bad Day at Black Rock (1955) is about the wartime bias against Japanese Americans.
- In The Karate Kid (1984), Ralph Macchio's character, Daniel, discovers a box containing references to the deaths of Mr. Miyagi's wife and child in the Manzanar camp, and to Mr. Miyagi (Pat Morita's character) being awarded the Medal of Honor while serving with the 442nd Infantry Regiment.
- The movie Come See The Paradise (1990), written and directed by Alan Parker, tells the story of a European American man who elopes with a Japanese American woman and their subsequent incarceration following the outbreak of war.
- The documentary Days of Waiting (1990), by Steven Okazaki, is about a white artist, Estelle Ishigo, who voluntarily joined her Japanese American husband at an internment camp. Inspired by Ishigo's book Lone Heart Mountain, it won an Academy Award for Best Documentary and a Peabody Award.
- The film Looking for Jiro (2011), by visual studies scholar and performance artist Tina Takemoto, explores queerness and homosexual desire in the camps, focusing on Jiro Onuma, a gay bachelor from San Francisco incarcerated at the Topaz War Relocation Center.
- Greg Chaney's documentary film The Empty Chair (2014) recounts the forced removal and incarceration of Japanese Americans from Juneau, Alaska and how the community stood in quiet defiance against such policies.
- The documentary The Legacy of Heart Mountain (2014) explores the experience of life at the Heart Mountain internment camp in Cody, Wyoming.
- The documentary film To Be Takei (2014) chronicles the early life of actor George Takei, who spent the war years in both the Rohwer and Tule Lake camps.
- The feature film Under the Blood Red Sun (2014), by Japanese American director Tim Savage and based on Graham Salisbury's novel of the same name, examines the life of a 13-year-old Japanese American boy living in Hawaii whose father is interned after the Japanese bomb Pearl Harbor.

==== Literature ====
Many books and novels were written by and about Japanese Americans' experience during and after their residence in internment camps among them can be mentioned the followed:

- Isabel Allende's novel The Japanese Lover (2017) presents the lifelong love affair between two immigrants, one of whom is Japanese American and who is sent along with his whole family to an internment camp.
- Jamie Ford's novel Hotel on the Corner of Bitter and Sweet (2009) tells of a Chinese man's search for an Oscar Holden jazz record bought in his childhood with a Japanese friend in Seattle and left behind during World War II, when she and her family were sent to a Japanese American internment camp.
- David Guterson's novel Snow Falling on Cedars (1994) and its 1999 film adaptation refer to the incarceration of the Imada family in Manzanar.
- Cynthia Kadohata's historical novel Weedflower (2006) is told from the perspective of the twelve-year-old Japanese American protagonist, and received many awards and recognition.
- Florence Crannell Means' novel The Moved-Outers (1945) centers on a high school senior and her family's treatment during the incarceration of Japanese Americans. It was a Newbery Honor recipient in 1946.
- John Okada's novel No-No Boy (1956) features a protagonist from Seattle, who was incarcerated with his family and imprisoned for answering "no" to the last two questions on the loyalty questionnaire. It explores the postwar environment in the Pacific Northwest.
- Jeanne Wakatsuki Houston and James D. Houston's book Farewell to Manzanar (1973) about Jeanne's experiences in the Manzanar War Relocation Center and her life after. It explores her experience as a child in the camp.
- Julie Otsuka's novel The Buddha in the Attic (2011), winner of the PEN/Faulkner Award for Fiction, tells the story of Japanese female immigrants in California, and ends on the story of the camps and the reaction of neighbors left behind.
- Julie Otsuka's novel When the Emperor was Divine (2002) tells the story of an unnamed Japanese American family incarcerated at the Topaz War Relocation Center in Utah. The novel is based on Otsuka's own family's experiences.
- Kermit Roosevelt III's historical novel Allegiance (2015) takes readers inside the US government and Supreme Court to examine the legal and moral debates and the little-known facts surrounding the detention of Japanese Americans. A Harper Lee Prize finalist, the novel is based on a true story.
- Vivienne Schiffer's novel Camp Nine (2013) is set in and near the Rohwer War Relocation Center in Arkansas.
- Toyoko Yamasaki wrote about the conflicting allegiances of Japanese Americans during the war in Futatsu no Sokoku (1983). University of Hawaiʻi Press published an English language translation by V. Dixon Morris under the title Two Homelands in 2007. It was dramatized into a limited series of the same name by TV Tokyo in 2019.
- George Takei published a graphic novel titled They Called Us Enemy (2019) about his time in the camps, the plight of Japanese Americans during the war, and the social & legal ramifications following the closure of the camps. It was co-written by Justin Eisinger and Steven Scott and illustrated by Harmony Becker. The book was awarded the Asian/Pacific American Librarians Association (APLA)-Literature, Eisner Award, and American Book Award in 2020. The book was banned in an American school district known as the Central York School District.

==== Music ====
- Greg Trooper's "Everywhere" (1986) is about an American soldier whose best friend is a Japanese-American who is driven to suicide by his experience of internment. It was later covered by Billy Bragg on his 1991 album "Don't Try This At Home".
- Fort Minor's "Kenji" (2005) tells the story of Mike Shinoda's grandfather and his experience in the camps.
- Jake Shimabukuro's solo album Peace Love Ukulele (2011) includes the song "Go For Broke" inspired by the World War II all-Japanese American 442nd US Army unit.
- Kishi Bashi's 2019 album Omoiyari uses the incarceration program as its central theme.
- Mia Doi Todd's 2020 song Take What You Can Carry (Scientist Dub One) is about the camp's impact on her mother and grandmother. It was released on February 20, 2020, when California lawmakers passed a resolution to formally apologize to Japanese Americans for the Legislature's role in their incarceration.

==== Spoken word ====
- George Carlin, during his monologues on individual rights and criticism towards the American government, spoke about the relocation of Japanese American citizens to the designated camps.
- Rachel Maddow's 6-episode podcast series Burn Order (2025) covers the U.S. government's World War II-era decision to intern Japanese Americans, revealing how officials covered up the unjust policy by ordering evidence destroyed (the "burn order"), and telling the story of those who fought to expose the truth, highlighting themes of racism, executive power, and historical accountability.

==== Psychological and Intergenerational Impacts ====
- The emotional and psychological toll of internment has been well-documented in personal narratives and oral histories. Survivors recount feelings of shame, loss of identity, and intergenerational trauma. The documentary Children of the Camps reveals that many internees carried the burden of these experiences well into adulthood, affecting family dynamics and cultural expression.

==== Television ====
- Hawaii Five-0 Episode 81, "Honor Thy Father" (December 2013), is dedicated to solving a cold case murder at the Honouliuli Internment Camp, some 70 years earlier.
- Much of The Terror: Infamy (2019) takes place at a fictional WRA camp in Oregon.
- Toyoko Yamasaki's Japanese language novel, Futatsu no Sokoku, addressesing the conflicting allegiances of Japanese Americans in the camps, was dramatized into a limited series of the same name by TV Tokyo in 2019.

==== Theater ====
- The musical Allegiance (2013), which premiered in San Diego, California, was inspired by the camp experiences of its star, George Takei.

=== Legal legacy ===
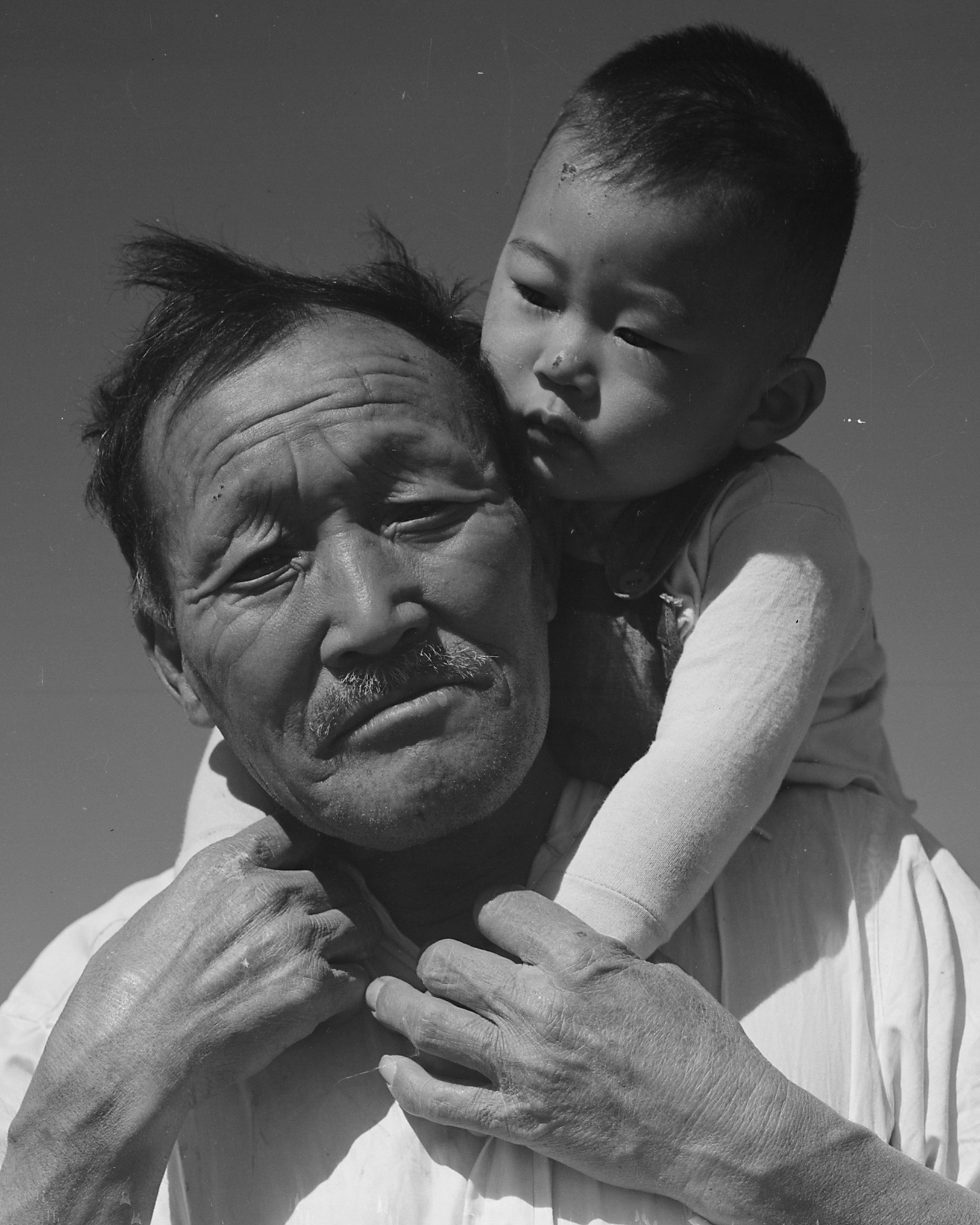
Grandfather and grandson at Manzanar, July 2, 1942

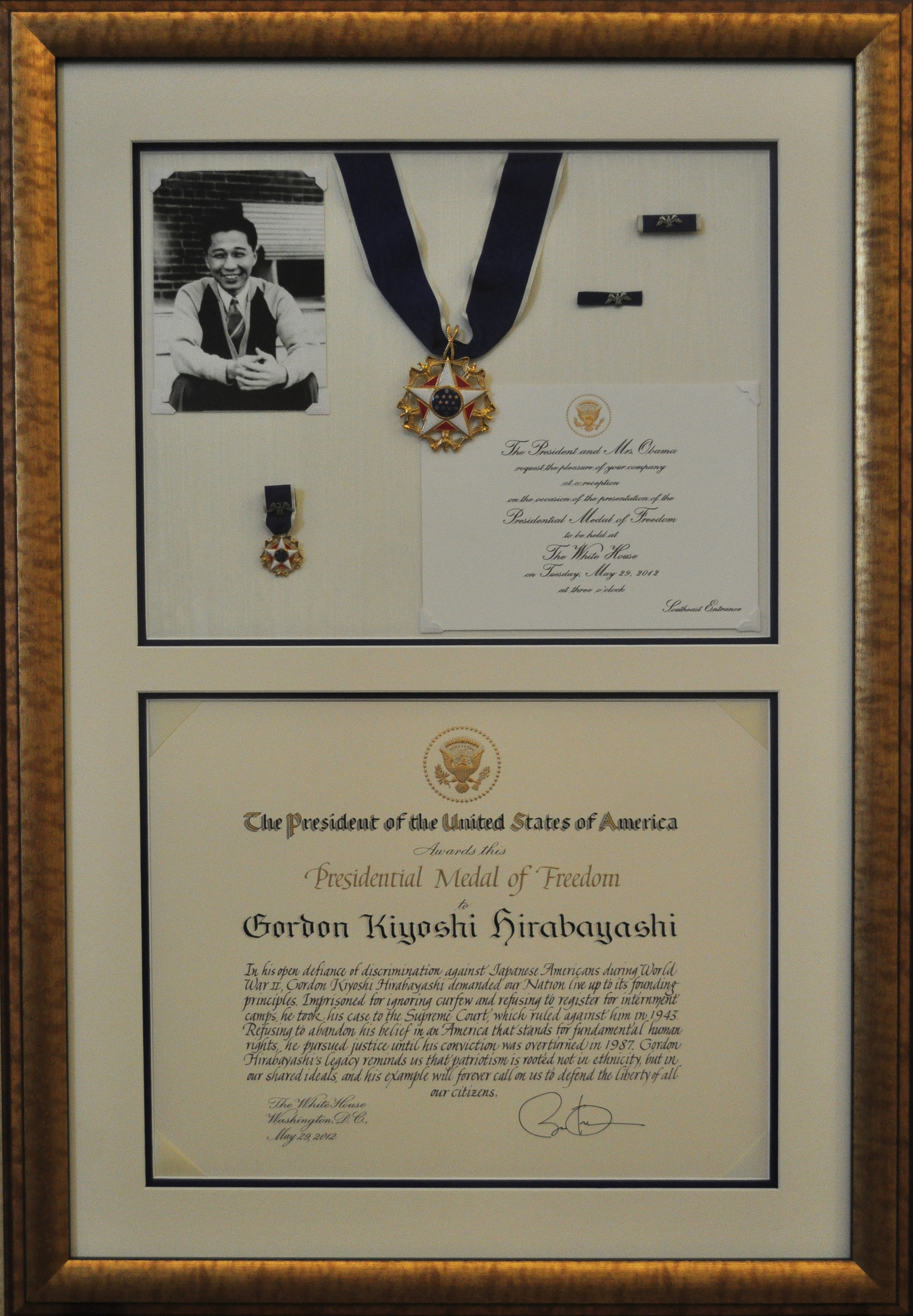
Gordon Hirabayashi's Medal of Freedom and certificate

Several significant legal decisions were made in response to the mass-incarceration of Japanese Americans, all of them were related to the government's power to detain citizens in wartime. Among the cases which reached the US Supreme Court were Ozawa v. United States (1922), Yasui v. United States (1943), Hirabayashi v. United States (1943), ex parte Endo (1944), and Korematsu v. United States (1944). In Ozawa, the court established that peoples defined as 'white' were specifically of Caucasian descent; In Yasui and Hirabayashi, the court upheld the constitutionality of curfews based on Japanese ancestry; in Korematsu, the court upheld the constitutionality of the exclusion order. In Endo, the court accepted a petition for a writ of habeas corpus and ruled that the WRA had no authority to subject a loyal citizen to its procedures.

Korematsu's and Hirabayashi's convictions were vacated in a series of coram nobis cases in the early 1980s. In the coram nobis cases, federal district and appellate courts ruled that newly uncovered evidence revealed an unfairness which, had it been known at the time, would likely have changed the Supreme Court's decisions in the Yasui, Hirabayashi, and Korematsu cases.

These new court decisions rested on a series of documents recovered from the National Archives showing that the government had altered, suppressed, and withheld important and relevant information from the Supreme Court, including the Final Report by General DeWitt justifying the incarceration program. The Army had destroyed documents in an effort to hide alterations that had been made to the report to reduce their racist content. The coram nobis cases vacated the convictions of Korematsu and Hirabayashi (Yasui died before his case was heard, rendering it moot), and are regarded as part of the impetus to gain passage of the Civil Liberties Act of 1988.

The ruling of the US Supreme Court in the Korematsu case was overturned in the 2018 majority opinion of Trump v. Hawaii (upholding a ban on immigration of nationals from several Muslim majority countries). Regarding the Korematsu case, Chief Justice Roberts wrote: "The forcible relocation of U.S. citizens to concentration camps, solely and explicitly on the basis of race, is objectively unlawful and outside the scope of Presidential authority."

Former Supreme Court Justice Tom C. Clark, who represented the US Department of Justice in the "relocation", writes in the epilogue to the book Executive Order 9066: The Internment of 110,000 Japanese Americans (1992):

The truth is—as this deplorable experience proves—that constitutions and laws are not sufficient of themselves... Despite the unequivocal language of the Constitution of the United States that the writ of habeas corpus shall not be suspended, and despite the Fifth Amendment's command that no person shall be deprived of life, liberty or property without due process of law, both of these constitutional safeguards were denied by military action under Executive Order 9066.

== See also ==
- Bibliography of the Japanese American Internment during World War II
- Outline of Japanese American Internment during World War II
- Allied prisoners of war of Japan
- Anti-Asian racism#United States
- Anti-Japanese sentiment#United States
  - Anti-Japanese sentiment in the United States
- Deportation of Koreans in the Soviet Union, in 1937, an aspect of population transfer in the Soviet Union
- Expulsion of Germans, from 1944 to 1950
- Anti-German sentiment#United States
  - Internment of German Americans, during World War II
- Anti-Italian sentiment#In the United States
  - Internment of Italian Americans, during World War II
- Internment of Japanese Canadians, during World War II
- Japanese Americans
  - History of Japanese Americans
- Nativism (politics)#United States
  - Nativism in United States politics
- Racism in the United States#Anti-Japanese sentiment and legislation
- Stereotypes of East Asians in the United States
- World War II evacuation and expulsion
- Yellow Peril
- Xenophobia#United States
  - Xenophobia in the United States
