= List of films about the internment of Japanese Americans =

Feature films about the World War II incarceration of Japanese Americans include:

== Feature films ==
- American Pastime (2007) Focuses on internees' use of baseball as a source of entertainment while living in camp
- Bad Day at Black Rock (1955)
- Come See the Paradise (1990) Follows an interracial family separated by the wartime incarceration program
- Day of Independence (2003) A Nisei teen immerses himself in baseball after his parents decide to return to Japan rather than remain in camp in the U.S.
- Farewell to Manzanar (1976) Made-for-television adaptation of Jeanne Wakatsuki Houston's memoirs of her time in the Manzanar internment camp
- Forgotten Valor (2001) Written and directed by Lane Nishikawa, a Nisei veteran remembers his experiences during World War II
- Go for Broke! (1951) Based on the real-life story of the 442nd Regimental Combat Team, a segregated army unit of Japanese American men, many of whom served while their families were incarcerated on the home front
- Go for Broke: An Origin Story (2018) Follows a group of University of Hawaii ROTC students during the tumultuous year after the attack on Pearl Harbor, as they navigate wartime Hawaii and fight discrimination. Adaptation of the comic book by Stacey Hayashi
- Hell to Eternity (1960) Biopic about Guy Gabaldon, a Mexican American Marine who was adopted by a Japanese American family at age 12 and went on to serve in World War II while his adoptive family was interned in Manzanar
- If Tomorrow Comes (1971) Made-for-TV movie following the romance between a Nisei man and a white woman at the start of World War II
- 99 Years of Love 〜Japanese Americans〜 (2010)
- Kommando 1944 (2018)
- The Last Bugle (2025) Web series based on the Japanese American 442nd
- Only the Brave (2006)
- Snow Falling on Cedars (1999) Adaptation of the novel by David Guterson
- Stand Up for Justice: The Ralph Lazo Story (2004)
- Strawberry Fields (1997)
- The Magic of Ordinary Days (2005)
- Under the Blood Red Sun (2014) A 13 yr old Japanese boy faces monumental adversity in 1941 Hawaii, when the Japanese bomb Pearl Harbor. Adaptation of the novel by Graham Salisbury

== Documentary films ==
Title	Release Year	Producer(s)
442: For the Future	1997	Patricia Kinaga
442: Live with Honor, Die with Dignity	2010	Junichi Suzuki
After Silence: Civil Rights and the Japanese American Experience	2003	Louis Shelton
All We Could Carry	2011	Steven Okazaki
America at Its Best: Legacy of Two Nisei Patriots	2001	Vince Matsuidaira, Nisei Veterans Committee of Seattle
And Then They Came for Us	2017	Abby Ginzberg and Ken Schneider (filmmaker)
The Art of Gaman: The Story Behind the Objects	2010	Rick Quan
Beyond Barbed Wire	1997	Steve Rosen, Terri DeBono
Camp Amache: The Story of an American Tragedy	2007	Don and Sandy Dexter
The Cats of Mirikitani	2006	Linda Hattendorf
Caught in Between: What to Call Home in Times of War	2004	Lina Hoshino
A Challenge to Democracy	1943	
ALTERNATIVE FACTS: The Lies of Executive Order 9066	2019	Jon Osaki and Lauren Kawana
Children of the Camps	1999	
Citizen Tanouye	2005	Robert Horsting, Craig Yahata
The Color of Honor: The Japanese American Soldier in WWII	1987	Loni Ding
Conscience and the Constitution	2000	Frank Abe
Days of Waiting	1990	Steven Okazaki
Dear Miss Breed	2000	Veronica Ko
Democracy Under Pressure: Japanese Americans and World War II	2000	Jeffrey S. Betts
A Divided Community	2012	Momo Yashima
Double Solitaire	1997	Corey Ohama
Emi	1979	Frank Nesbitt, Michael Toshiyuki Ono
Encounter with the Past: American Japanese Internment in World War II	1980	Tak Shindo
Enemy Alien	2011	Konrad Aderer
The Empty Chair	2014	Greg Chaney
Family Gathering	1988	
Farewell to Manzanar	1973	
A Flicker in Eternity	2013	Ann Kaneko, Sharon Yamato
Forced Out: Internment and the Enduring Damage to California Cities and Towns	2003	KVIE
Forsaken Fields	2001	Midori Sperandeo
From a Silk Cocoon	2006	Satsuki Ina
Fumiko Hayashida: The Woman Behind the Symbol	2009	Lucy Ostrander
Furusato: The Lost Village of Terminal Island	2005	David Meltzer
Gila River and Mama: The Ruth Mix Story	2011	Claire Mix
Guilty by Reason of Race	1972	NBC
Heart Mountain: Three Years in an Internment Camp	1994	Dianne Fukami
Hidden Internment: The Art Shibayama Story	2004	Casey Peek, Irum Shiekh
History and Memory: For Akiko and Takashige	1992	Rea Tajiri
The Idaho Homefront: Of Camps and Combat	2007	Jim Peck
In Time Of War	2004	Andrea Palpant
Interactions	2000	Justin Lin
Japanese Relocation	1942	Office of War Information
Jimmy Murakami—Enemy Alien	2010	Sé Merry Doyle
Justice Betrayed	1992	Gordon Lee, Honolulu JACL
The Legacy of Heart Mountain	2014	David Ono and Jeff MacIntyre
Life Interrupted: Reunion and Remembrance in Arkansas	2006	Japanese American National Museum
Manzanar	1972	Robert A. Nakamura
Manzanar Fishing Club	2012	Cory Shiozaki
Meeting at Tule Lake	1994	Scott T. Tsuchitani
Most Honorable Son	2007	Bill Kubota
The Music Man of Manzanar	2005	Brian T. Maeda
Nebraska's Nisei	1998	University of Nebraska
The Nisei: The Pride and the Shame	1965	CBS
Nisei Soldier: Standard Bearer for an Exiled People	1983	Loni Ding
Of Civil Wrongs and Rights: The Fred Korematsu Story	2000	Eric Paul Fournier
Passing Poston	2008	Joe Fox
A Personal Matter: Gordon Hirabayashi vs. the United States	1992	John de Graaf
Pilgrimage	2006	Tad Nakamura
Prejudice and Patriotism: Americans of Japanese Ancestry in the Military Intelligence Service of WWII	1998	
Prisoners and Patriots: The Untold Story of Japanese Internment in Santa Fe	2011	Neil H. Simon
Rabbit in the Moon	1999	Emiko Omori
Relocation, Arkansas	2015	Vivienne Schiffer
Remembering Manzanar	2004	National Park Service
Rescued By Fate	2014	Christopher HK Lee
Return to the Valley: Japanese American Experience After WWII	2003	Scott Gracheff
Searchlight Serenade	2012	Claire Reynolds
Shikata Ga Nai: An Inconvenient American	2019	Lauren Yanase
The Silent Glory	2000	Zed Merrill
Something Strong Within	1994	Japanese American National Museum
Stand Up for Justice: The Ralph Lazo Story	2004	John Esaki
Take Me Home: A Child's Experience of Internment	2005	David Tanner, Andrea Palpant
Tanforan: From Race Track to Assembly Center	1994	Dianne Fukami
Time of Fear	2004	Sue Williams
To Be Takei	2014	
Topaz	1945	
Topaz	1988	KUED
Toyo's Camera: Japanese American History During WWII	2009	Junichi Suzuki
Unfinished Business	1985	Steven Okazaki
The Untold Story: Internment of Japanese Americans in Hawai‘i	2012	Japanese Cultural Center of Hawai‘i
When You're Smiling: The Deadly Legacy of Internment	1999	Janice D. Tanaka
Winter in My Soul	1986	Bob Nellis, KTWO
Without Due Process: A Documentary about America's Concentration Camps	2001	Brian Beanblossom
Valor With Honor	2008	Burt Takeuchi
Visible Target	1985	Cris Anderson, John de Graaf
Yankee Samurai	1985	Katriel Schory
Yuri Kochiyama: Passion for Justice	1993	Pat Saunders, Rea Tajiri

== See also ==
- List of documentary films about the Japanese American internment
