= List of prison films =

This is a list of prison films — films which are primarily concerned with prison life or prison escape or have at least one memorable prison scene.

== 0–9 ==
- 13 Dead Men
- 20,000 Years in Sing Sing, 1932
- 3 Deewarein
- 6,000 Enemies

== A ==
- The Adventures of Huckleberry Finn, 1939
- Angel on My Shoulder
- Against the Wall
- Alien 3
- American History X
- Animal Factory
- Anything for Her
- Around the World in 80 Days, 1956

== B ==
- Bad Boys, 1983
- Bangkok Hilton
- Beyond Re-Animator
- The Big Bird Cage
- The Big Doll House
- The Big House, 1930
- Big Stan
- Birdman of Alcatraz
- Black Mama White Mama
- Blackmail
- Blood In Blood Out
- Bloodfist III: Forced to Fight
- Borstal Boy
- Boys' Reformatory
- Brawl in Cell Block 99
- Breath, 2007
- Bride of Frankenstein
- Bringing Up Baby
- Brokedown Palace
- Bronson
- Brubaker
- Brute Force, 1947

== C ==
- Caesar Must Die
- Caged Fury, 1989
- Caged in Paradiso
- Canon City
- Captain America: Civil War
- Captain Blood, 1935
- Captives
- Carandiru
- The Case Is Closed, Forget It
- Castle on the Hudson
- Cell 211
- Cell 2455, Death Row, 1955
- The Chain Gang, 1930
- Chain Gang, 1950
- Chain Gang, 1984
- Chained Heat
- Chicago, 2002
- Chicken Run
- Chopper
- Civil Brand
- Clash by Night, 1963
- A Clockwork Orange
- Con Air
- Con Games
- The Concrete Jungle
- Condition Red
- Convict 13
- Convicted, 1950
- Convicts 4
- Cool Hand Luke
- The Count of Monte Cristo, 1934
- Crime After Crime
- The Criminal
- The Criminal Code
- Crulic: The Path to Beyond

== D ==
- Dear Sarah
- Death Warrant
- Deathrow Gameshow
- Destroyer
- Devil's Island, 1939
- Dirty Hands, 2008
- Do Aankhen Barah Haath, 1947
- Dog Pound
- Doing Hard Time
- Doing Time, 2002
- Don't Let Them Shoot the Kite
- Dracula's Daughter
- Dressed to Kill, 1946
- Dragon in Jail
- Dust Be My Destiny

== E ==
- Each Dawn I Die
- Ergastolo
- Ernest Goes to Jail
- Escape from Alcatraz
- Escape from Sobibor
- Escape Plan
- The Escapist, 2008
- Everynight ... Everynight
- The Experiment, 2010
- Das Experiment

== F ==
- Face/Off
- Fast-Walking
- Felon
- Female Prisoner 701: Scorpion
- The First Time Is the Last Time
- For You I Die
- Fortress, 1992
- Fortress 2: Re-Entry
- Fortune and Men's Eyes
- The Fox of Glenarvon

== G ==
- Gamer
- Get the Gringo
- Ghost in the Cell
- Ghosts... of the Civil Dead
- The Ghost of Frankenstein
- Gideon's Trumpet
- Go for Broke!, 1951
- Goodfellas
- Gone With the Wind
- The Green Mile
- Greenfingers
- Guardians of the Galaxy
- Gunga Din

== H ==
- H3
- Half Past Dead
- Half Past Dead 2
- Heartlock
- Hell to Eternity
- Hellgate, 1952
- The Hill
- The Hole, 1960
- Holes
- The Hot Box
- Houdini
- House of Dracula
- House of Frankenstein, 1944
- House of Numbers, 1957
- The Human Centipede 3 (Final Sequence)
- The Hunchback of Notre Dame, 1939
- Hunger, 2008
- The Hurricane, 1937
- The Hurricane, 1999

== I ==
- I Am a Fugitive from a Chain Gang
- I Believe in You
- I Love You Phillip Morris
- I Want to Live!
- I'm Going to Get You, Elliott Boy
- If I Want to Whistle, I Whistle
- In Hell, 2003
- The Inner Cage
- In the Name of the Father
- In Prison Awaiting Trial
- An Innocent Man
- Inside the Walls of Folsom Prison
- Invisible Stripes
- Island of Fire

== J ==
- Jailbait, 2004
- Jamila dan Sang Presiden
- Je li jasno, prijatelju?
- El juego de Arcibel
- Juarez, 1939

== K ==
- Kill Kill Faster Faster
- King of the Damned
- Kiss of the Spider Woman

== L ==
- The Last Castle
- Last Light
- The Last Mile, 1959
- Law Abiding Citizen
- Let's Go to Prison
- Les Misérables, 1935
- Lilies
- Lion's Den, 2008
- Lock Up
- Lockdown
- Locked Up: A Mother's Rage
- The Loners
- The Longest Yard, 1974
- The Longest Yard, 2005
- Love Child, 1982
- Lucky Break, 2001

== M ==
- Made in Britain
- Madea Goes to Jail
- The Magic of Ordinary Days
- Les mains libres
- Maléfique
- The Maltese Falcon, 1931
- A Man Escaped
- Manners of Dying
- Marquis
- The Mask of Zorro
- Maundy Thursday
- Mean Frank and Crazy Tony
- Mean Machine
- Memoirs of Prison
- Men of San Quentin
- Midnight Express
- Miracle in Cell No. 7, 2013
- Miracle in Cell No. 7, 2019, Philippines
- Miracle in Cell No. 7, 2019, Turkey
- Miracle in Cell No. 7, 2022
- Moon 44
- Mrs. Soffel
- Muktodhara
- Murder in the First
- Mutiny in the Big House
- My Life for Ireland
- My Six Convicts

== N ==
- Naked Gun 33 1/3: The Final Insult
- National Security, 2012
- Natural Born Killers
- New Alcatraz
- The New Guy
- A Nightmare on Elm Street, 1984
- A Nightmare on Elm Street, 2010
- Night Train to Munich
- No Escape, 1994
- North by Northwest

== O ==
- Odd Man Out
- Ohm Kruger
- One Day in the Life of Ivan Denisovich, 1970
- Out of Sight
- Outland
- Outside These Walls

== P ==
- Paddington 2
- Papillon
- The Paradine Case
- Pardon Us
- The Party
- The Pearl of Death
- Penitentiary, 1938
- Penitentiary II
- Perfect Exchange
- Pirates of the Caribbean: Curse of the Black Pearl
- Porridge
- The Pot Carriers
- Pressure Point
- Prison, 1987
- Prison Break
- Prison of Secrets
- Prison on Fire
- Prison on Fire II
- Prison on Fire – Life Sentence
- Prison Song
- Prison-A-Go-Go!
- Prisoner 1040
- The Prisoner of Shark Island
- The Professor
- A Prophet
- Pros & Cons
- Psycho, 1960
- Public Hero No. 1
- The Pursuit of Happiness, 1971

== R ==
- Raising Arizona
- The Reader
- Reflections on a Crime
- Release the Prisoners to Spring
- Riding High, 1950
- Riki-Oh: The Story of Ricky
- Ring of Death
- Riot
- Riot in Cell Block 11
- The Rock
- Roxie Hart, 1942
- Runaway Train

== S ==
- Sadomania
- Scarlett, 1994
- The Score, 1978
- La Scoumoune
- Scum
- The Second Hundred Years
- Seed, 2007
- A Sense of Freedom
- Seven Keys
- Sex, Drugs, Rock & Roll
- The Shawshank Redemption
- Sherlock Holmes, 1932
- Short Eyes
- Shot Caller
- The Sign of the Cross
- Sing Sing
- Slaughterhouse Rock
- Sleepers
- Somebody Has to Shoot the Picture, 1990
- The Son of Monte Cristo
- Spotlight Scandals
- Starred Up
- Stir
- Stir Crazy
- Stoic
- Stranger Inside
- Strawberry Fields, 1997
- The Sun Sets at Dawn

== T ==
- Tango & Cash
- The Adventures of Tom Sawyer, 1938
- Toy Story 3
- The Raid 2
- The Trial of Joan of Arc
- This Is My Affair
- Tower of London, 1939
- Tower of London, 1962
- Train to Alcatraz, 1948
- True Believer, 1989
- Turning to Stone
- Two Thousand Women
- Two-Way Stretch

== U ==
- Un chant d'amour
- Unchained
- Undisputed
- Undisputed II: Last Man Standing
- Undisputed III: Redemption
- The United States of Leland

== V ==
- Vendetta, 1986
- Violence in a Women's Prison
- Virginia City, 1940

== W ==
- Walls
- The Weak and the Wicked
- Wedlock
- Wee Willie Winkie
- Weeds, 1987
- White Heat
- Wild Bill, 2011
- Women in Cell Block 7
- Wrong Turn 3: Left for Dead

== Y ==
- You Can't Beat the Law
- You Can't Take It With You

== Z ==
- The Zero Years, 2005

== Documentaries featuring prisons ==
- The Cats of Mirikitani
- Days of Waiting: The Life & Art of Estelle Ishigo
- Family Gathering
- The Feminist on Cellblock Y, 2018
- Prison Ball
- To Be Takei
- Topaz, 1945
- Unfinished Business, 1985

== See also ==
- Prison film
- Films set on Devil's Island
- Category:Films set in prison
