= Wakatsuki (surname) =

Wakatsuki (若槻 or 若月) is a Japanese surname.

People with the name include:

- Kenya Wakatsuki (若月 健矢, born 1995), Japanese baseball player
- Wakatsuki Reijirō (1866–1949), 25th and 28th Prime Minister of Japan
- Jeanne Wakatsuki Houston (1934–2024), author of Farewell to Manzanar
- Chinatsu Wakatsuki, singer
