= Andre Rosey Brown =

American film, television actor, police officer and football coach

- Born: February 7, 1956; Rockford, Illinois, U.S.
- Died: July 18, 2006 (aged 50); Northridge, California, U.S.
- Occupations: Actor, police officer, football coach
- Years active: 1985–2002

Andre Rosey Brown (February 7, 1956 – July 18, 2006) was an American film and television actor, police officer, and football coach.

== Life and career ==
Brown was born in Rockford, Illinois. Before becoming an actor, he was a police officer for the Inglewood Police Department. He had attended Rocky Mountain College where he played football and supported himself by working as a jazz drummer. He then worked in law enforcement in Seattle and Los Angeles.

Brown began his television career in 1985, appearing in the police procedural television series Hill Street Blues, playing a wrestler. He began his film career in the television film The Return of Mickey Spillane's Mike Hammer, where he got a call for the role of the tough-guy "Big Black Man", in 1986.

In 1998, Brown retired from being a police officer for the Inglewood Police Department, where he served for 14 years. After retiring, he continued his film and television career.

In the 1990s and 2000s, Brown appeared and guest-starred in numerous film and television programs including Designing Women, Caddyshack II, Throw Momma from the Train, Night Court, The Golden Girls, What's Happening Now!!, Canadian Bacon, Full House, The Fresh Prince of Bel-Air, Frasier, Living Single, Meet Wally Sparks, Dave's World, The Drew Carey Show, Friends, Back in Business, Matlock, Off the Mark, Class Act, Daddy Dearest, Barb Wire, Car 54, Where Are You?, Step By Step, Naked Gun 33 1/3: The Final Insult, ER, The Wayans Bros., Catfish in Black Bean Sauce, Money Talks, The Jamie Foxx Show, Martin, Pros & Cons, Big Fat Liar, Space Jam, and Forget Paris. He also played the main role of "Morgan Washington" in the crime drama television series 413 Hope St., appearing in eight episodes.

Brown retired from his acting career in 2002, last appearing in the film Devious Beings.

== Death ==
On July 18, 2006, Brown died of a short illness in Northridge, California, at the age of 50.

== Filmography ==
=== Film ===
Year	Title	Role	Notes
1986	The Return of Mickey Spillane's Mike Hammer	Big Black Man	TV movie
1987	Dutch Treat	Tyrese Baxter	
1987	Student Confidential	"Stick"	
1987	Who's That Girl	Record store security guard	
1987	Off the Mark	Sonny	
1987	Throw Momma from the Train	"Rosey"	
1988	Caddyshack II	Construction worker	
1989	Peter Gunn	Bouncer	TV movie
1989	Warm Summer Rain	Ticket agent	
1989	Tango & Cash	Cash's cellmate	
1990	Taking Care of Business	"Heavy G"	
1990	Night Visions	Wedding security guard	uncredited
1991	Night of the Warrior	Fat man	
1991	Hi Honey - I'm Dead	Guard	TV movie
1991	Driving Me Crazy	Bluto	
1991	The Story Lady	Security Guard	TV movie
1992	Bloodfist III: Forced to Fight	Clint	
1992	In the Heat of Passion	Unemployed man	
1992	Mirror Images	Detective Anders	
1992	Class Act	Jail guard	
1992	Hitz	Moso	
1992	The Finishing Touch	Jace	
1994	Car 54, Where Are You?	Fat prisoner being poisoned from food	uncredited
1994	The Silence of the Hams	Motorcycle cop	
1994	Naked Gun 33 1/3: The Final Insult	Corridor guard	
1995	The Stranger	Tony Brown	
1995	The Demolitionist	Frank "Big Frank"	
1995	Fist of the North Star	"Sandman"	
1995	Canadian Bacon	Man	uncredited
1995	Forget Paris	Huge bodyguard	
1995	Amanda and the Alien	Trucker #1	TV movie
1996	If Looks Could Kill	Black Buddah	TV movie
1996	One Good Turn	Salako	
1996	Barb Wire	"Big Fatso"	
1996	Kingpin	Skidmarks friend	
1996	Space Jam	Umpire	
1997	Meet Wally Sparks	Teamster	
1997	Back in Business	"Muffin"	
1997	Money Talks	Aaron bodyguard	
1997	Moonbase	Sanitation engineer	
1999	Catfish in Black Bean Sauce	Guard #2	
1999	Pros & Cons	Jim "Big Jim"	
2000	American Tragedy	Rosie Grier	TV movie
2001	Perfect Fit	"Packy"	
2002	Big Fat Liar	Security guard	
2002	Devious Beings	"Tiny"	

=== Television ===
Year	Title	Role	Notes
1985	Hill Street Blues	Wrestler	1 episode
1986	L.A. Law	Driver #1	1 episode
1986–1990	Hunter	Purly / Pearlie / Lester's bodyguard	3 episodes
1986	The New Mike Hammer	Video security guard	1 episode
1987	Designing Women	Wendell Mack	1 episode
1987	The Tortellis	Mr. Jackson	1 episode
1987	The New Gidget	Max	1 episode
1987	What's Happening Now!!	Lou Holiday	1 episode
1988–1989	The Golden Girls	Bodyguard / bodybuilder	2 episodes
1989	Matlock	Carter Evans	1 episode
1990	Night Court	Burly Guy	1 episode
1991	Good Grief	Guard	1 episode
1991	Anything But Love	Unknown	1 episode
1991	The New Adam-12	Unknown	1 episode
1993	Step by Step	Security guard	1 episode
1993	Martin	Big convict	1 episode
1993	Living Single	The doorman	1 episode
1993	Daddy Dearest	Doctor	1 episode
1993–1995	Full House	Bodyguard / Weeb	2 episodes
1995	The Wayans Bros.	Caesar "Black Caesar"	1 episode
1995	The Fresh Prince of Bel-Air	"Tiny"	1 episode
1996	Friends	Delivery man	1 episode
1997	Dave's World	Bouncer	1 episode
1997	Frasier	Prisoner	1 episode
1997	The Drew Carey Show	The bodyguard	1 episode
1997–1998	413 Hope St.	Morgan Washington	8 episodes
1998	Smart Guy	Mr. Jerome	1 episode
1998	The Jamie Foxx Show	Thick Neck	1 episode
1999	MADtv	Ricky Martin's bodyguard	1 episode
2000	ER	Sick guy	1 episode
2000	18 Wheels of Justice	Johnny Keller	1 episode
2002	The Parkers	Lamar	1 episode
2002	My Wife and Kids	Burly man	1 episode
