= Propaganda for Japanese-American internment =

Propaganda efforts to rationalize and justify Japanese-American internment

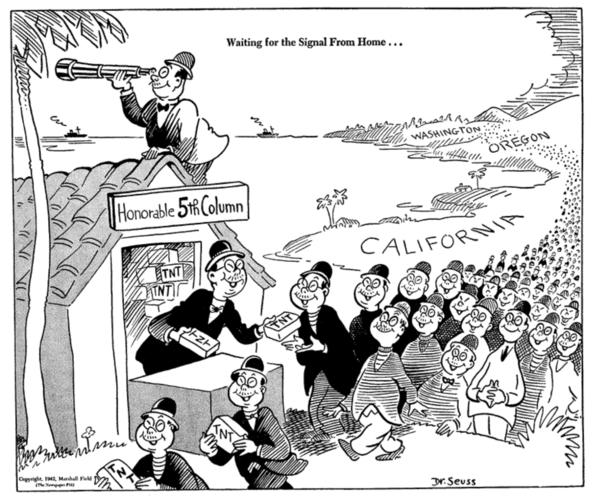
1942 editorial propaganda cartoon in the New York newspaper PM by Dr. Seuss depicting Japanese Americans in California, Oregon, and Washington–states with a large population of ethnic Japanese–as prepared to conduct sabotage against the U.S.

Propaganda for Japanese-American internment is a form of propaganda created between 1941 and 1944 within the United States that focused on the relocation of Japanese Americans from the West Coast to internment camps during World War II. Several types of media were used to reach the American people such as motion pictures and newspaper articles. The significance of this propaganda was to project the relocation of Japanese Americans as matter of national security.

== History ==
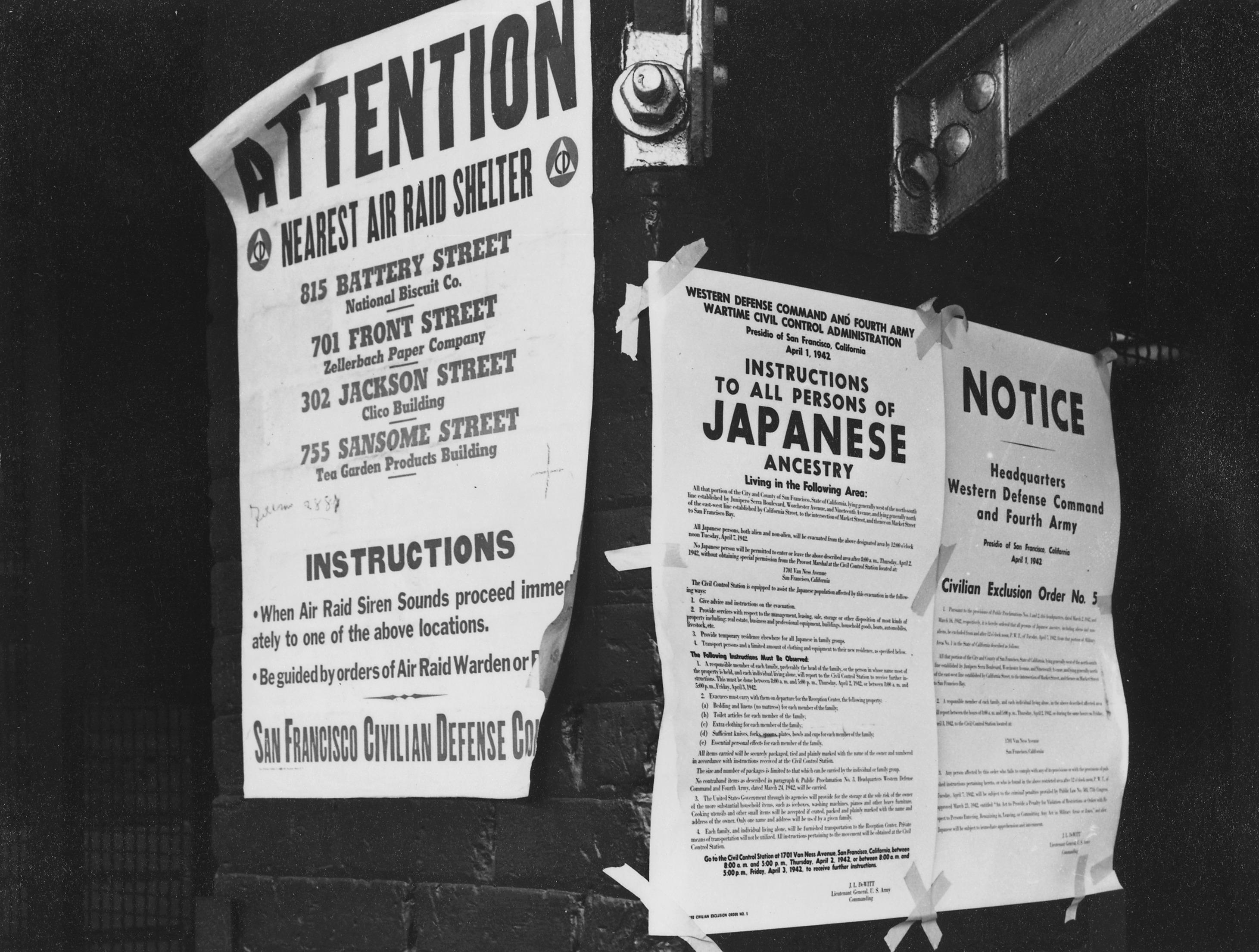
Notices explaining Executive Order 9066 were posted around the West Coast to advertise Japanese-American Relocation.

After the Japanese attack on Pearl Harbor on December 7, 1941, American attitudes towards people of Japanese ancestry indicated a strong sense of racism. This sentiment became further intensified by the media of the time, which played upon issues of racism on the West Coast, the social fear of the Japanese people, and citizen-influenced farming conflicts with the Japanese people. This, along with the attitude of the leaders of the Western Defense Command and the lack of perseverance by the Justice Department to protect the civil rights of Japanese Americans led to the successful relocation of both native and foreign born Japanese.

On February 19, 1942, President Franklin D. Roosevelt issued Executive Order 9066, which recognized specific strategic sites on the United States West Coast as off-limits to people of Japanese descent. This order gave members of the military the authority to remove Japanese people from the area if their presence there was deemed too close to the strategic installations. In April 1942, Exclusion Order 346 was issued to force the Japanese American citizens to live in assembly centers which were located in various open spaces such as fairgrounds and tracks. By the fall of 1942, the Japanese people had been evacuated out of the West Coast and into inland internment camps built by the United States government to hold over 80,000 evacuees. Propaganda in favor of Japanese-American internment was produced by both the government and local citizens through mediums such as movies and print.

== Films ==
The War Relocation Authority and Office of War Information produced multiple films about Japanese internment during World War 2. They were intended to form and shift public opinion of those living in the United States at the time.

A Challenge to Democracy (1944) is an 18-minute film created by the War Relocation Authority in collaboration with the Office of War Information and Office of Strategic Services. It is one of the most exhaustive films created by the United States about Japanese internment as well as the 442nd Infantry regiment. It is composed of footage from other propaganda films such as The Way Ahead (1943) and Go For Broke (1943).

A Challenge to Democracy depicts Japanese American internees who live in a camp that functions like a 'normal' community'. The camps are shown to have activities that would be found outside of the camps, such as sports, school, clubs, and other organizations. They also film internees who are working in agricultural fields, producing their own crops which are solely for the use of the internment camps. The narrator assures viewers that the internees are not disloyal to the United States, it is simply just a form of precaution that is being taken. The War Relocation Authority is said to have produced this film after multiple claims that they were being too 'soft' and 'coddling' the internees and using tax money to care for the internees while resources were scarce during the war.

Japanese Relocation (1942 film), a 9-minute film also by the U.S. Office of War Information, was the first documentary about Japanese American removal. The film implies that the West coast was in danger of becoming a war zone after Pearl Harbor and removal was for safety. It emphasized that this was done in a democratic, carefully planned manner, often showing internees happily cooperating. The footage of the camps implied that there was sense of order and command in the camps, with the high angles and panoramic views. Near the end of the film, it ensures viewers that internees will be able to leave after enemies had left the country. It also sends a message to the Axis countries asking that if any US prisoners are in their care, they hope they would be treated in the same 'democratic' ways.

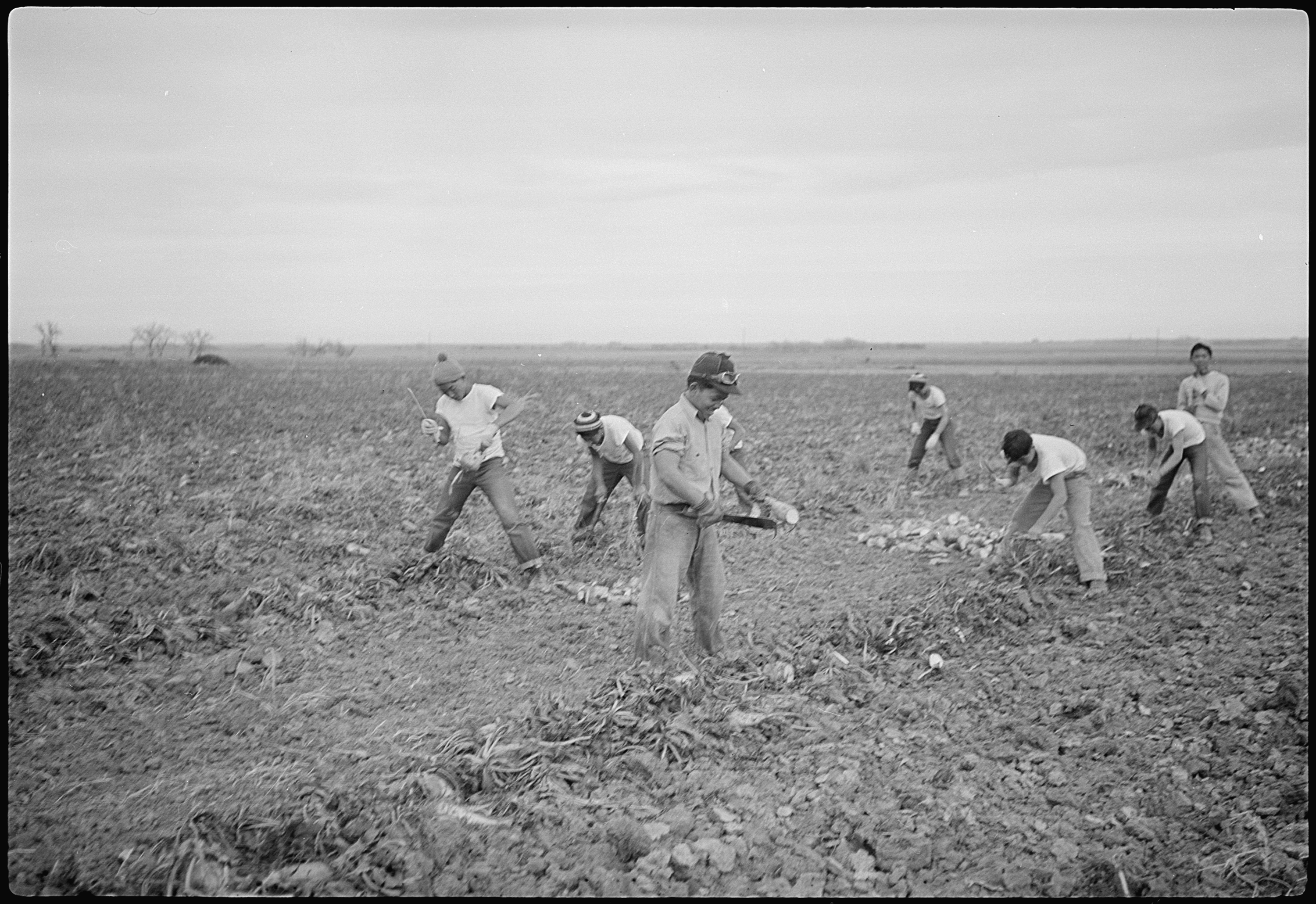
Internees farming sugar beets while relocated at the Amache Internment Camp

== Newspapers ==
As a prominent news source for many Americans in the 1940s, the newspaper media also played an integral role in influencing national attitudes toward Japanese American citizens. Many times, editorials published in these newspapers would approach relocation as a necessary inevitability characteristic in times of war.

The San Francisco Chronicle on February 21, 1942, displayed a pro-Japanese-American internment stance, stating, "We have to be tough, even if civil rights do take a beating for a time".

The Bakersfield Californian was among the newspapers of the time to criminalize the Japanese-American population, stating, "We have had enough experiences with Japs in times of peace to emphasize the opinion that they are not to be trusted." Violent sentiment would also be characteristic of some of these editorials, as when a writer to the Corvallis Gazette Times expressed, "The loyal Jap American citizens have the law on their side, but that may not protect them. Besides, what is the law and what is the Constitution to a dead Jap. If they are smart, they will not return".

Many newspapers would also publish propaganda cartoons concerning the Japanese military, which fueled a general racist attitude towards Japanese-American residents.

A Newsweek column published in March 1942 presented arguments for and against the relocation of individuals of Japanese heritage. Those in favor of internment were paranoid of coastal submarine attacks near Los Angeles and Santa Barbara. Opponents expressed concern about undertaking a moral war overseas while simultaneously persecuting an ethnic group on U.S. soil.

A weekly publication, The Argus (Seattle), outlined several issues through editorial and opinion pieces. The newspaper took a pro-internment stance and in 1942 wrote, "If the innocent are interned with the guilty, it will not be a very serious matter. If any Japs are allowed to remain at large in this country, it might spell the greatest disaster in history" (Argus, February 14, 1942, p. 1).

The West Seattle Herald weekly newspaper came out as pro-evacuation of Japanese residing in the U.S. two months after the attack on Pearl Harbor. On February 26, 1942, the front page read, "Complete evacuation of aliens--a common sense move--why delay?" and "GET 'EM OUT!" on page 7 of the newspaper (West Seattle Herald, February 26, 1942, p. 7).

Not all Seattle publications shed the internment in a positive light,The Bainbridge Island Review released statements showing where they stood.

The Bainbridge Review, which was located on Bainbridge Island near Washington state, was the first place in which the U.S. military evacuated all civilians of Japanese descent. This publication was the first to shed the internment in a negative light and became the only newspaper in this area to oppose internment in their editorials. In the editorial, they stated "..There is danger of a blind, wild, hysterical hatred of all persons who can trace ancestry to Japan…who can say that the big majority of our Japanese Americans are not loyal…their record bespeaks nothing but loyalty: their sons are in our army…it [the Review] will not dispute the federal government if it, in its considered wisdom, calls for the removal of all Japanese. Such orders… will be based on necessity and not hatred." It stressed that Japanese Americans were citizens and deserved to be trusted as being loyal to the U.S.

== Racial Stereotypes in Anti-Japanese Propaganda ==
Anti-Japanese propaganda in the United States during WWII heavily relied on the use of dehumanizing depictions of the Japanese and Japanese-Americans. These sentiments that have been present throughout America are believed to have existed before WWII, and were perpetuated through the wartime propaganda. Displaying race as different in a negative light through propaganda was a common way to show the difference between good and evil. This concept is tied to xenophobia, defined as "anything which is perceived as being foreign or strange." Stereotypes that could be easily identified in Anti-Japanese propaganda included exaggerated skin color and perpetuated the idea of the Japanese being weaker or less capable than Americans, as well as picturing the Japanese as animals or murderous. Many of the available examples of racism in Anti-Japanese propaganda share the same likeness of a Japanese person with yellow skin, squinted eyes, and sharp, fang-like teeth. Many of the examples also include the saying, "This is the Enemy". This phrase further emphasizes the goal of the United States to illustrate the Japanese as evil. This success by the media to cultivate a hostile view toward the Japanese allowed for the widespread acceptance by the American people of Japanese internment camps.

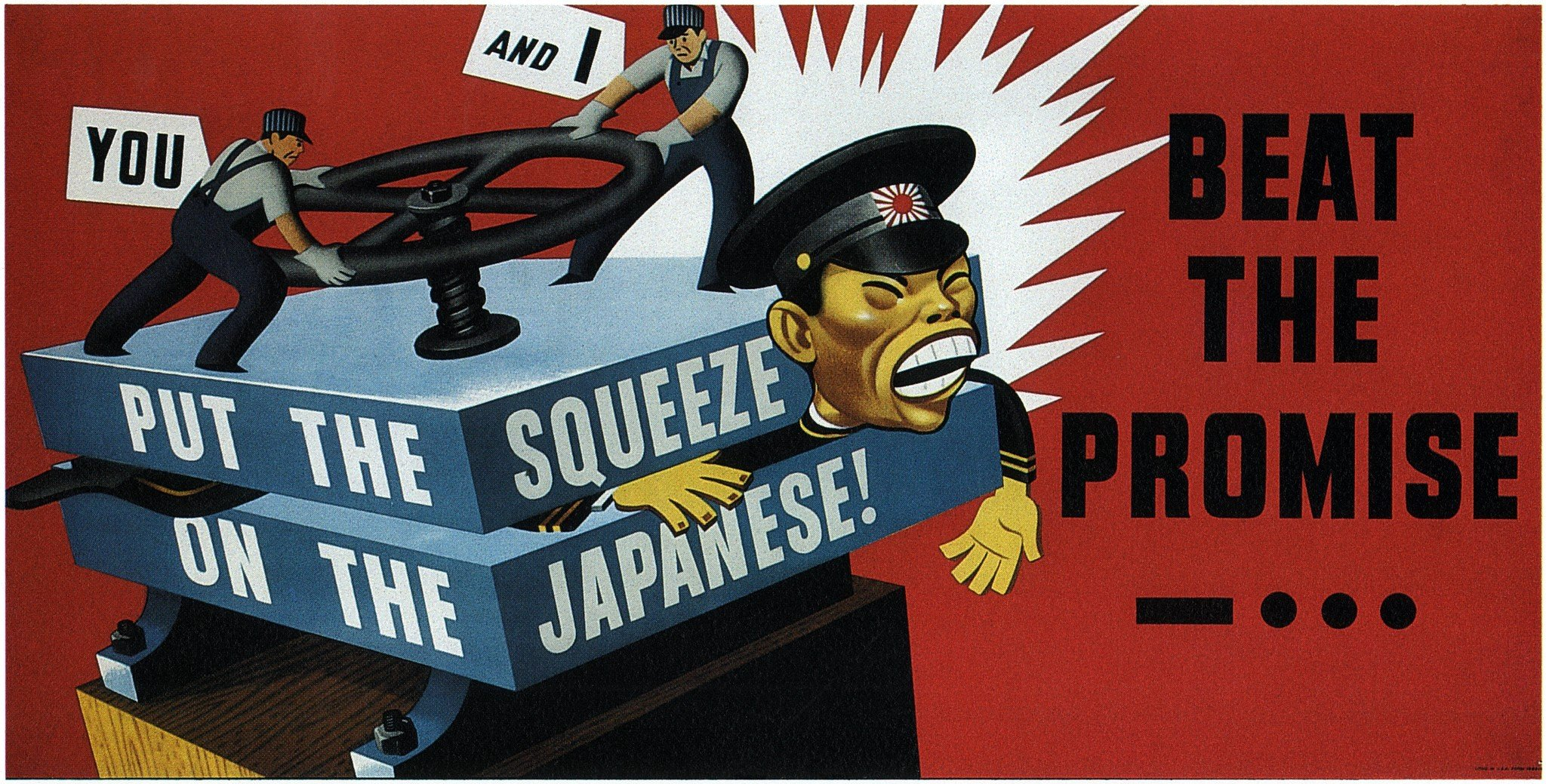
An example of WWII Anti-Japanese propaganda dating from 1943. This form of propaganda features racial stereotypes through the depiction of the Japanese. The "You" and "And I" represent America.

The effects on American Society that resulted from the racism toward Japanese people during the war lasted post WWII. Anti-Japanese sentiments in the United States have decreased and relations with the Japanese are far less strained. In fact, according to a study conducted by Pew Research Center, approximately two-thirds of American citizens feel that they are able to trust Japan and are content with the way that current relations with Japan are today. 68% of Americans said they felt they could trust Japan as opposed to 75% of Japanese people who felt they could trust the United States. There is certainly still animosity held from more senior populations from both American and Japanese society. Pew says that over half of Americans believe that the bombing of Hiroshima and Nagasaki was justified.

== End of internment ==
On December 17, 1944, the United States Supreme Court deemed that exclusion of loyal Japanese-American citizens was unconstitutional and through Public Proclamation 21, the internment came to an end. It included the resettlement of the majority of the Japanese Americans and equal treatment of these people once back in their homes and neighborhoods. Those who were determined to be potential security risks by the criteria established by the Justice Department and War Department were not allowed into specific high risk areas.

Though resettlement was issued by the U.S. government, anti-Japanese propaganda continued throughout the duration of the war until V-J Day on August 15, 1945.

Soon after, in 1948, the U.S. Information and Educational Exchange Act of 1948 was passed by Congress. It is now known as the Smith–Mundt Act initiated by Karl Mundt This act served to prevent the State Department from releasing media or material that was intentionally planned to be seen internationally. Additionally, the provisions of the act fixated on the communication of the government domestically. This provision was where the discussion of the U.S. propaganda was held. It maintained that the U.S. State Department should only engage in such material out of necessity and should not become a monopoly of domestic broadcasting.

On July 2, 2013, the Smith-Mundt Act was amended.The Smith-Mundt Modernization Act of 2012 now allows for domestic dissemination from government agencies such as the State Department and the Broadcasting Board of Governors (BBG). Many American civilians hold concerns about the possibility of propaganda being reintroduced into American due to this amendment.
