= Estelle Ishigo =

American artist

- Born: Estelle Peck; July 15, 1899; Oakland, California, U.S.
- Died: February 25, 1990 (aged 90); Los Angeles, California, U.S.
- Known for: Watercolors, pencil and charcoal drawings, sketches
- Notable work: Lone Heart Mountain
- Spouse: Arthur Ishigo (m. 1928; died 1957)

Estelle Ishigo (née Peck; July 15, 1899 – February 25, 1990) was an American visual artist known for her watercolors, pencil and charcoal drawings, and sketches. During World War II she and her husband were incarcerated at the Heart Mountain Relocation Center in Wyoming. She subsequently wrote about her experiences in Lone Heart Mountain and was the subject of the Oscar winning documentary Days of Waiting: The Life & Art of Estelle Ishigo.

Ishigo stands out as being one of the few individuals who were not ethnically Japanese incarcerated under Executive Order 9066.

== Early life ==
Estelle Peck was born in Oakland, California, on July 15, 1899. She was the daughter of concert singer Bertha Apfels and portrait and landscape artist Bradford Peck. She was of English, Dutch and French ancestry. A year after she was born her family relocated from Oakland to San Francisco. Throughout her childhood, she was surrounded by music and art. Her parents were largely absent and she was primarily raised by a nurse. At the age of four, she showed promising talent in both painting and singing, and started learning the violin by the time she was twelve. At the age of twelve, when her family relocated once again to Los Angeles, where she was sent to live with relatives and strangers, and abandoned by her parents.

In Los Angeles, Peck faced difficulties and was sexually assaulted by at least one guardian. Eventually she dropped out of high school and ran away. Later on, Peck decided to become a painter and enrolled in the Otis Art Institute, where she met San Franciscan Nisei Arthur Ishigo (1902–1957). He had moved to Los Angeles with dreams of becoming an actor and worked as a janitor at Paramount Studios. In 1928, the couple drove to Tijuana, Mexico to get married in order to avoid American anti-miscegenation laws. Being an interracial couple, they faced hardship and Estelle was disowned by her family. The couple lived in the Japanese American community of Los Angeles, and were avid campers – finding refuge from racial prejudice in nature.

== Incarceration ==
Following the attack on Pearl Harbor, the couple faced heightened discrimination. Arthur Ishigo and all other ethnic Japanese who worked at Paramount Studios were fired on December 8, 1941, one day after the attack. Shortly thereafter, Estelle resigned as an art instructor at the Hollywood Art Center School to join her husband. Both were American citizens. After President Roosevelt signed Executive Order 9066, Arthur was ordered to report to the temporary detention center at the Pomona Fairgrounds. Estelle faced a decision – stay with her husband of 13 years and be incarcerated or remain in Los Angeles alone. She was informed that if she chose to go with her husband, she would not have any privileges due to her race and would have the same status as the Japanese American prisoners. On May 10, 1942, Estelle chose to report for incarceration, and began sketching the series of events that followed.

Estelle and Arthur were first held at the Pomona Assembly Center, where over 5,000 individuals of Japanese ancestry were incarcerated. During her time at Pomona, Ishigo joined a staff of 19 residents to create the camp newspaper, the Pomona Center News. In August 1943, the Ishigos were sent to Heart Mountain Relocation Center, which held over 12,000 prisoners in Wyoming. During their time at Heart Mountain, Estelle continued to use her artwork to document their lives.

Ishigo immersed herself in camp life. She joined the Heart Mountain Mandolin Band and a camp theater troupe. She sketched and painted and felt accepted into the Japanese American community. Ishigo later wrote, "Strange as it may sound, in this desperate and lonely place, I felt accepted for the first time in my life. The government had declared me a Japanese and I no longer saw myself as white. I was a Japanese American. My fellow Heart Mountain residents took me in as one of their own." She chose charcoal sketches and pencil drawings as her main media because she found watercolors to be "too clean and untroubled" to capture the experiences of camp. Many of her paintings and drawings depicted the cruel weather of Wyoming, documenting the wind and snow. Although the Ishigos never had children, much of Estelle's work involved depicting children within the camps, illustrating young Japanese American youth playing while behind barbed wire. Estelle took a job in the Documentary Section of the Reports Division for Heart Mountain and was paid $19 a month for her work (the maximum wage available for prisoners).

== Post-war and death ==
The War Relocation Authority (WRA) closed the Heart Mountain concentration camp in November, 1945. Like most other prisoners, the Ishigos had nothing to come back to. The couple was each given $25 and a train ticket, and headed back to Los Angeles. With no work and no place to live, Estelle and Arthur lived in segregated trailer camps outside of Los Angeles. When the trailer camps were condemned by the Los Angeles Health Department in the Spring of 1948, Japanese American families moved into housing projects.

Arthur took odd jobs at fish canneries, but was deeply depressed from the experience of incarceration. The couple lived in poverty for years following the end of the war. Estelle joined a Japanese American band to get back the feeling of community that she has in the internment camp. In 1948, as part of the Japanese American Evacuation Claims Act the Ishigos submitted a list of their lost property, totaling over $1,000. However, they were only granted $100 for their loses. The couple tried to petition for a higher settlement, but by 1956 they gave up and accepted the lowball settlement of $102.50.

On August 19, 1957, Arthur Ishigo died of cancer at the age of 55. Following Arthur's death, Estelle took a job as a mimeograph operator to earn money. In the 1960s, Estelle resumed her teaching role at the Hollywood Art Center School. In 1983, documentary filmmakers and former Heart Mountain prisoners tracked down Estelle living in a basement apartment in Los Angeles. She had lost both of her legs to gangrene and was living on only $5 a week for food. She was quickly placed in a convalescent hospital in Hollywood.

Estelle died on February 25, 1990, at the age of 90.

== Notable works ==
=== Lone Heart Mountain ===
The Heart Mountain High School Class of 1947 helped Ishigo republish her 1972 book Lone Heart Mountain with the help of the Hollywood chapter of the Japanese American Citizens League (JACL). The memoir captures words and images of her incarceration. She wrote about the psychic power of Heart Mountain itself, "Imprisoned at the foot of the mountain, towering in its silence over the barren waste, we searched its gaunt face for the mystery of our destiny."

=== Days of Waiting ===
Days of Waiting (1990) was produced, written and directed by Steven Okazaki. When Okazaki met Ishigo she reportedly told him, "I've been waiting for someone to tell my story to, then I can die." She died shortly before it was released. The film notably won a Peabody Award and an Academy Award for Best Documentary (Short Subject).

== Legacy and collections ==
In 1972, the California Historical Society opened Months of Waiting, an exhibit of art from the concentration camps that included work from Estelle Ishigo, along with artists Hisako Hibi, George Matsusaburo Hibi, Miné Okubo, Chiura Obata, and Henry Sugimoto.

Estelle left her watercolor collection in the care of Allen Hendershott Eaton, an art collector who notably amassed a large collection of camp artwork. After the Eaton collection was narrowly saved from a private sale in 2015 and acquired by the Japanese American National Museum (JANM), Ishigo's watercolors were conserved and loaned to Heart Mountain, where she had been incarcerated. Following the loan from JANM, Bacon Sakatani, an Advisory Council member of the Heart Mountain Wyoming Foundation (HMWF) and personal friend of Ishigo, donated 137 of her pencil sketches. Her work was on view at Heart Mountain from May 15 – December 31, 2018, in the show Works by Estelle Ishigo: The Mountain was Our Secret. The Japanese American National Museum houses 120 of Ishigo's drawings, sketches and watercolors. The Coolidge and Dame Family Papers, 1809–2010 at the Massachusetts Historical Society also holds a few Ishigo works.

The draft of Lone Heart Mountain is housed as part of the Estelle Ishigo Papers at the Charles E. Young Research Library, Special Collections of UCLA. This collection consists of documents (including many documents pertaining to Ishigo's post-war Evacuation Claims Act filings), records, correspondence, photographs, paintings, pencil drawings and sketches, and watercolor sketches.

== See also ==
- Miné Okubo
- Benji Okubo
- Ralph Lazo
- Jimmy Mirikitani
- Dorthea Lange
- List of documentary films about Japanese American WWII incarceration
