= Living on Tokyo Time =

1987 film

- Directed by: Steven Okazaki
- Written by: Steven Okazaki; John McCormick
- Produced by: Dennis Hayashi; Lynn O'Donnell
- Starring: Minako Ohashi; Ken Nakagawa
- Cinematography: Steven Okazaki
- Edited by: Steven Okazaki; Cheryl Yoshioka
- Distributed by: Skouras Pictures
- Release date: 1987
- Running time: 83 minutes
- Country: United States
- Language: English

Living on Tokyo Time is a 1987 film written and directed by Steven Okazaki and starring Minako Ohashi and Ken Nakagawa.

It is a romantic comedy revolving around Japanese American rock musician Ken and his marriage of convenience to Kyoko, a young immigré from Japan who speaks limited English.

The film received a nomination for a Grand Jury Prize at the 1987 Sundance Film Festival.
