= Japanese relocation =

Japanese relocation may refer to World War II events:

- Japanese American internment
- Japanese Canadian internment
- Japanese Relocation (1942 film)
