= Steven Okazaki =

American documentary filmmaker (born 1952)

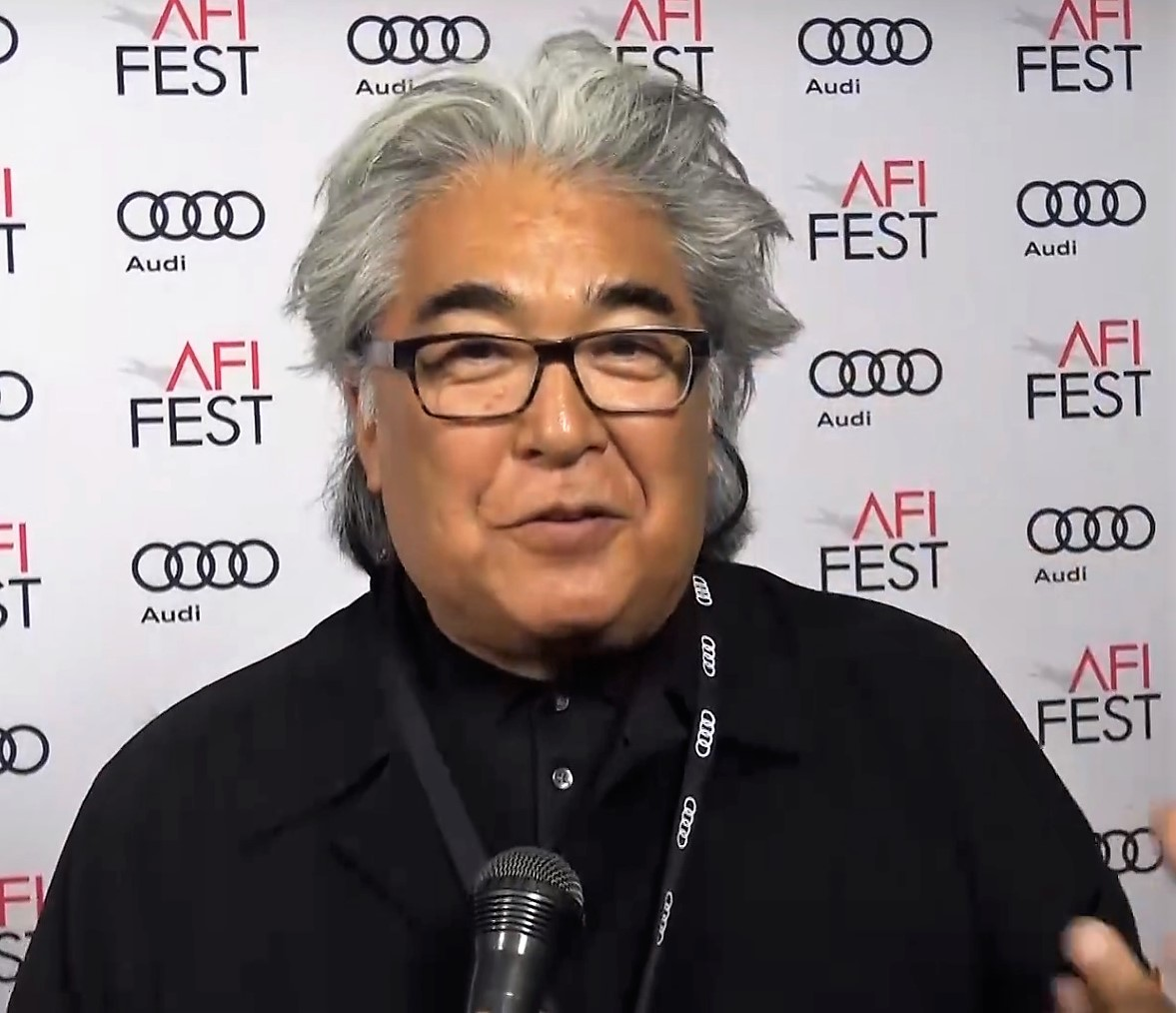
- Okazaki in 2017
- Born: March 12, 1952 (age 74); Venice, Los Angeles, California, U.S.
- Education: San Francisco State University
- Occupations: Director; Producer; Writer; Editor; Cinematographer
- Years active: 1976–present
- Spouse: Peggy Orenstein (m. 1991)
- Children: Daisy Tomoko

Steven Okazaki (born March 12, 1952) is an American documentary filmmaker known for his raw, cinéma vérité-style documentaries that frequently show ordinary people dealing with extraordinary circumstances. He has received a Peabody Award, a Primetime Emmy and has been nominated for four Academy Awards, winning an Oscar for the documentary short subject, Days of Waiting: The Life & Art of Estelle Ishigo.

== Career ==
Steven Okazaki started his career at Churchill Films in 1976, making narrative and documentary shorts. In 1982, he produced Survivors for WGBH Boston, a documentary short about Hiroshima and Nagasaki atomic bomb survivors. In 1985, he received his first Academy Award nomination for Unfinished Business, about three Nisei Japanese Americans who challenged the Internment of Japanese Americans during World War II in court. In 1987, he wrote and directed the independent film, Living on Tokyo Time, which premiered in competition at the Sundance Film Festival and was theatrically released by Skouras Pictures.

In 1991, he won the Academy Award for Best Documentary (Short Subject) for Days of Waiting: The Life & Art of Estelle Ishigo, about Estelle Peck Ishigo, a Caucasian artist who accompanied her Japanese American husband to a Japanese internment camp. Okazaki continued to make documentary films for PBS and later with HBO. In 2006, he received his third Academy Award nomination for The Mushroom Club, a personal documentary about his journey to Japan to interview atomic bomb survivors on the 60th anniversary of the bombing of Hiroshima. He received the 2008 "Exceptional Merit in Nonfiction Filmmaking" Primetime Emmy Award for White Light/Black Rain: The Destruction of Hiroshima and Nagasaki, and his fourth Oscar nomination in 2009, for the documentary short The Conscience of Nhem En, about three survivors of the Tuol Sleng Prison. His production company, Farallon Films, is based in Berkeley, California.

Okazaki was also involved as a multi-instrumentalist in a San Francisco punk rock music group called The Maids (1977–79), whose sole record, a single called 'Back to Bataan,' gained some notoriety by way of later punk music compilations.

== Filmography ==
| Year | Title | Distributor |
|---|---|---|
| 1976 | A-M-E-R-I-C-A-N-S | Farallon Films |
| 1982 | Survivors | PBS |
| 1983 | The Only Language She Knows | Farallon Films |
| 1985 | Unfinished Business | PBS |
| 1986 | Living on Tokyo Time | Skouras Pictures |
| 1988 | Hunting Tigers | Farallon Films |
| 1991 | Days of Waiting: The Life & Art of Estelle Ishigo | PBS |
| 1992 | Troubled Paradise | PBS |
| 1993 | The Lisa Theory | Finnish TV |
| 1994 | American Sons | PBS |
| 1995 | Alone Together: Young Adults Living With HIV | NHK |
| 1996 | Life Was Good: The Claudia Peterson Story | NHK |
| 1999 | Black Tar Heroin: The Dark End Of The Street | HBO |
| 2002 | The Fair | PBS |
| 2005 | Rehab | HBO |
| 2006 | The Mushroom Club | HBO, Cinemax |
| 2007 | White Light/Black Rain: The Destruction of Hiroshima and Nagasaki | HBO |
| 2009 | The Conscience of Nhem En | HBO |
| 2010 | Crushed: The Oxycontin Interview | Farallon Films |
| 2011 | Approximately Nels Cline | Farallon Films |
| 2011 | All We Could Carry | Farallon Films |
| 2014 | Giap's Last Day At The Ironing Board Factory | PBS |
| 2015 | Heroin: Cape Cod, USA | HBO |
| 2016 | Mifune: The Last Samurai | Strand Releasing |
