= Catch Me If You Can (1989 film) =

1989 film by Stephen Sommers

- Theatrical release poster
- Directed by: Stephen Sommers
- Written by: Stephen Sommers
- Produced by: Jonathan D. Krane; Rachel Langsam; Alan Lasoff; Don Schain
- Starring: Matt Lattanzi; Loryn Locklin; M. Emmet Walsh; Geoffrey Lewis
- Cinematography: Ronn Schmidt
- Edited by: Bob Ducsay
- Music by: Tangerine Dream
- Distributed by: Management Company Entertainment Group
- Release date: July 28, 1989
- Running time: 106 minutes
- Country: United States
- Language: English
- Budget: $800,000
- Box office: $3,686

Catch Me If You Can (stylized as Catch Me... If You Can) is a 1989 American action comedy film starring Matt Lattanzi, Loryn Locklin, Grant Heslov, Geoffrey Lewis and M. Emmet Walsh. The film was the feature film directorial debut of writer and director Stephen Sommers, with a soundtrack by Tangerine Dream.

== Plot ==
The film follows the antics of high school students and their adventure in saving their school from being closed. Class president Melissa has started raising money through donations to keep the school open, but when the fundraising begins to slow down, Dylan convinces Melissa that he can save the school. They take $3000 of the money that has already been raised to bet on an illegal car race that Dylan is convinced he will win. Dylan does not win the race, and in order to get their money back, he is forced to double down on an impossible race against the clock that only the town legend has ever accomplished. The film ends with a spectacular stunt as car and driver jump through the goalposts during a football game between two local high schools, Apollo and Cathedral.

== Cast ==
- Matt Lattanzi as Dylan Malone
- Loryn Locklin as Melissa Hanson
- Grant Heslov as Nevil
- Billy Morrissette as "Monkey"
- Geoffrey Lewis as Mr. Johnson
- M. Emmet Walsh as Johnny Phatmun

== Production ==
The film was shot on location throughout St. Cloud, Minnesota (where Sommers grew up), and at Cathedral High School and Apollo High School, which Sommers attended. It was funded independently and had a budget of $800,000. The film was Sommers's directorial debut and was written by him. When production finished, the studio that had promised to distribute the movie had gone out of business, and it was eventually released by MCA Inc. in July 1989. The movie did not fare well at the box office, grossing only $3,686 in its domestic run, but it made $7 million overseas.

The movie featured local residents cast as extras in the production and many of the hot-rods, classic cars and muscle cars featured in the race scenes were owned by central Minnesota residents.

The movie is rated PG in New Zealand.

== Soundtrack ==
The film's soundtrack was performed and recorded by Tangerine Dream. It is their 20th soundtrack album and 50th album overall. All tracks were composed by Edgar Froese and Paul Haslinger.

No.	Title	Length
1.	"Dylan's Future"	4:42
2.	"Sad Melissa"	2:07
3.	"Fast Eddie's Car"	1:28
4.	"Back to the Race"	2:15
5.	"Melissa Asks Dylan Out"	1:14
6.	"Dylan Alone at Home"	3:32
7.	"Melissa Needs Help"	1:01
8.	"The Kiss"	0:59
9.	"Racing Montage"	3:40
10.	"The Clock Is Ticking"	2:13
11.	"Widow Maker"	1:41
12.	"Dylan's Dream"	1:25
13.	"Taking the Test"	1:27
14.	"Back to the Race Again"	2:28
15.	"One More Chance"	2:25
16.	"Melissa's Challenge"	1:25
17.	"Widow Maker Race"	2:43
18.	"Dylan's Triumph"	4:17
19.	"Catch Me If You Can (Main Theme)"	1:45
