= Fortress (1992 film) =

1992 film by Stuart Gordon

- Theatrical release poster
- Directed by: Stuart Gordon
- Screenplay by: Troy Neighbors; Steven Feinberg; David Venable; Terry Curtis Fox
- Story by: Troy Neighbors; Steven Feinberg
- Produced by: John Davis; John Flock
- Starring: Christopher Lambert; Kurtwood Smith; Loryn Locklin; Lincoln Kilpatrick
- Cinematography: David Eggby
- Edited by: Tim Wellburn
- Music by: Frédéric Talgorn
- Production companies: Davis Entertainment Company; Village Roadshow Pictures
- Distributed by: Dimension Films (North America; through Miramax Films); Roadshow Film Distributors (Australia)
- Release dates: 9 October 1992 (Fantasy Film Festival); 21 January 1993 (Australia); 3 September 1993 (U.S.)
- Running time: 96 minutes
- Countries: Australia; United States
- Language: English
- Budget: $8–15 million
- Box office: $48–65 million

Fortress is a 1992 science fiction action film directed by Stuart Gordon and shot at Warner Roadshow Movie World Studios (now Village Roadshow Studios) in Queensland, Australia. The story takes place in a dystopian future. The main character, John Henry Brennick (Christopher Lambert), and his wife Karen B. Brennick (Loryn Locklin) are sent to a maximum security prison because she is pregnant with a second child, which is against a strict one-child policy.

Fortress premiered at the Fantasy Film Festival on 9 October 1992 before being released by Roadshow Film Distributors in Australia on 21 January 1993 and by Dimension Films (through Miramax Films) in the United States on 3 September 1993. The film was a financial success, but critical reviews were mixed.

A sequel, Fortress 2: Re-Entry, was released in 2000, with Lambert reprising his role, making it the first installment in the Fortress film series.

== Plot ==
In 2017, the United States is a military dictatorship. Ex-army officer John Henry Brennick and his wife Karen attempt to cross the Canada–United States border to Vancouver to have a second child. A strict one-child policy forbids a second pregnancy, even after the loss of the firstborn, so Karen wears a magnetic vest to conceal her pregnancy from security scanners. A guard notices the vest and raises the alarm.

Brennick is caught, believing Karen to have escaped, and sentenced to thirty-one years at the Fortress, a maximum security prison run by the Men-Tel Corporation. The prisoners are used as slave labor to further expand the Fortress as part of the prison-industrial complex. Inmates are implanted with "intestinators" which induce severe pain or death for physical control and mental conditioning. Prison Director Poe oversees the Zed-10 computer that monitors daily activities. The prison is underground in the desert, within a pit that can only be crossed by a retractable bridge. The overcrowded cells are secured by laser walls.

John is imprisoned with inmates Abraham, a model prisoner who works as Poe's manservant and is awaiting parole; D-Day, a machine and demolitions expert; young offender Nino Gomez; and Stiggs, who tries to extort John. John learns that Karen is being held in an upper level with their unborn child, who is now officially owned by Men-Tel and will be incinerated at birth.

Stiggs' friend Maddox instigates a brawl with John; Maddox is shot by a security turret and falls to his death. John grabs Maddox's intestinator and gives it to D-Day before he is taken for a mind-wipe as punishment.

Poe, infatuated with Karen, tells her that if she lives with him, he will release John from the mind-wipe chamber. She accepts. Poe is revealed to be a cyborg. Four months later, a heavily pregnant Karen uses her access to the prison computer in Poe's quarters to restore John from his mind-wiped state. She steals a holographic map and gives it to Abraham to pass on to John. D-Day dismantles Maddox's intestinator and uses a component to remove the others' intestinators.

During a work shift, John's group puts their intestinators in an air-duct and stage a brawl, causing Zed to trigger the devices and blow the duct open to prepare their escape. Poe promptly flushes the duct with steam and sends in "Strike Clones": networked cyborgs armed with flamethrowers and machine guns. Stiggs is shot dead, but the rest of the group seize a Strike Clone and use its weaponry to destroy the remaining Clones.

Zed alerts Poe to Karen's actions. He reveals to her that her child, like all Men-Tel-owned babies, will be extracted by caesarean section and made a cyborg. Poe strangles Abraham.

Hijacking a gun turret to use as an elevator, John's group travels to Zed's control room. John takes Poe hostage and orders him to release Karen. Poe gives the order but Zed refuses, stating that Men-Tel does not negotiate during hostage situations. A gun turret kills Poe, leaving John's group without leverage. D-Day hacks into Zed and activates a feedback virus, triggering a complete system crash causing all automated security to fail, allowing the prisoners to escape. John and Gomez rescue Karen, hijack a truck, and escape to Mexico where Karen enters labour and gives birth to their child, while an INTERPOL red notice is issued for their recapture.

== Cast ==
- Christopher Lambert as John Henry Brennick, the main protagonist and former captain in the black berets
- Loryn Locklin as Karen B. Brennick, John's wife and a former computer programmer in the Army (Note: At the film's opening, when John and Karen try to cross the border, Karen's identity on a computer screen is listed as "Brennick, K. S.")
- Annika Thomas as Brennick Baby
- Kurtwood Smith as Prison Director Poe
- Clifton Collins, Jr. (credited as Clifton Gonzalez-Gonzalez) as Nino Gomez, John's young cellmate
- Carolyn Purdy-Gordon as Voice of Zed-10, the computer system that oversees the prison
- Lincoln Kilpatrick as Abraham, a prison trusty
- Jeffrey Combs as "D-Day", a computer geek
- Vernon Wells as Maddox, the prison bully
- Tom Towles as Stiggs, Maddox's buddy
- Warwick Capper as Braindead Prisoner, a prisoner who was mind-wiped (uncredited)
- John Pierce as Moustached Prisoner (uncredited)

== Production ==
Producer John Davis developed Fortress as part of his company's domestic distribution deal with 20th Century Fox before the project was acquired by Miramax for distribution through their Dimension Films label. Arnold Schwarzenegger had initially been positioned to headline the film before ultimately bowing out. Peter Kent, Schwarzenegger's stunt double, had worked with Stuart Gordon on Re-Animator which Schwarzenegger had seen and liked. Schwarzenegger had invited Davis to see Re-Animator at his home and recommended Gordon to direct Fortress. Davis hired Gordon and noted that without Schwarzenegger to star, the film's original planned budget of $50 million would instead have to suffice at around $11 million which Gordon was confident he could achieve as he was used to working with smaller budgets. Gordon had initially intended to direct Fortress after completing Body Snatchers for Warner Bros., but following delays brought about by re-writes Warner Bros. mandated Gordon was forced to abandon Body Snatchers as he had a contractual obligation to direct Fortress. Fortress was filmed at Warner Roadshow Movie World Studios (now Village Roadshow Studios). Gordon spoke of wanting to address the prison system particularly the shift it experienced during the Presidencies of Ronald Reagan and George H. W. Bush as not only were there more prisons built under their leadership than at any other point in U.S. history, but prisons became less focused on rehabilitation and more on harsher punishment. Gordon took visual inspiration for the look of the prison, wanting to keep the film within the realm of possibility despite its sci-fi setting, from Pelican Bay State Prison which Gordon described as having a "Hellish" atmosphere. While the script was written in mind with Schwarzenegger, Gordon felt the main character should be more of an everyman which led to Christopher Lambert being cast in the role. Lambert often insisted on doing his own stunts which became a point of mild disagreement between Gordon and Lambert.

== Release ==
=== Theatrical ===
In April 1993, it was reported that distribution rights for Fortress had been acquired by Miramax for theatrical distribution by Miramax's label Dimension Films. Fortress was theatrically released in the United States on September 3, 1993.

According to director Stuart Gordon, Fortress was able to take in over $100 million worldwide. Gordon felt that Fortress was not as successful in the United States as other territories because Miramax on the advice of their marketing department downplayed the fact the film took place in a futuristic prison because it was felt that prison films were a harder sell at the U.S. box office. Gordon stated that the key appeal of the film was in its portrayal of a possible prison of the future and note territories that used the tagline "High Tech Hell" were quite successful.

=== Home media ===
Fortress was released on VHS and LaserDisc in 1994 by LIVE Home Video, and re-released along with the DVD in 1999 by Artisan Entertainment. Columbia TriStar Home Video also released the film on VHS, LaserDisc and DVD in some other territories from 1993 to 2004, while Sony Pictures Home Entertainment re-released the DVDs from 2006 to 2017. The film also released on DVDs with Full Uncut Editions in UK and Germany. The film was released on Blu-ray for the first time on 27 January 2013 by Echo Bridge Home Entertainment and released in Spain on 9 December 2015 by Resen. In July 2017, Nameless Media (under the label of SPHE) also released the film on Blu-ray and DVD, including a Steelbook covers and a figurine model of the Strike Clone.

=== Alternative ending ===
The original ending of Fortress has been edited from some versions of the film. After reaching Mexico, Brennick, his wife, and Gomez end up at a barn where she starts going into labor. Gomez goes out to the truck to get a blanket for the soon-to-arrive baby. The Fortress computer, Zed-10, manages to establish a remote linkup with the truck, overriding its internal controls. The truck suddenly comes to life and runs Gomez down, killing him. Brennick shoots the truck with the Strike Clone machine gun until it seems to jam. He then sets it on fire with the flamethrower attachment. The truck crashes into the barn, exploding. Brennick climbs into the burning ruins to find his wife sitting against an old tractor, clutching her newborn baby.

== Reception ==
=== Box office ===
Fortress grossed A$2,855,154 at the box office in Australia. Internationally it grossed a total of US$40 million, turning into a profitable movie for having been shot with a budget of $12,000,000.

=== Critical response ===
The film holds a 38% 'Rotten' score on review aggregator Rotten Tomatoes, based on 16 reviews with an average rating of 4.7/10. Stephen Holden of The New York Times said: "Like so many other futuristic movies, Fortress is a lot better at setting up its premise than in developing a story around it, [but] for all its faults, [it] has an unusually energetic imagination. At its best, it blends RoboCop, The Handmaid's Tale, and Brave New World into something scary, original and grimly amusing".

Nathan Shumate of Cold Fusion Video Reviews said: "It's a good little film, kept very interesting by a multitude of plot twists. [...] The beauty of this movie is that it's not terribly ambitious; [director Stuart] Gordon knew that it was not meant to be this generation's defining science fiction film, and so instead had fun with it. The characters are colorful and engaging, and the actors are b-movie all-stars; the story moves along at a fair clip; and the prison itself is a novel setting, with plenty of inconsistencies in future technology but none that sit up and insist that you notice them".

James Berardinelli of ReelViews said: "Fortress has [...] an impressive visual style, [...] the set design is excellent, and the action scenes are well-paced, [but it's] hampered by a poorly-constructed story line [and] never gets on track. Instead of entering the rarefied atmosphere inhabited by such films as Aliens and the original Terminator, it falls in line with the likes of Freejack and Alien 3".

== Sequel ==
Prior to the film's release, it was reported that Davis Entertainment Company and Village Roadshow Pictures had hired Troy Neighbors and Steven Feinberg to write a treatment for Fortress 2 with Christopher Lambert slated to return and production to commence in early 1994. However, due to negative critical reception, a sequel to Fortress did not immediately move forward. A sequel titled Fortress 2: Re-Entry was released in 2000.

== See also ==
- List of films featuring surveillance
- List of prison films
- Private prison
- Prison-industrial complex
