= The Conscience of Nhem En =

- Directed by: Steven Okazaki
- Produced by: Steven Okazaki
- Production company: Farallon Films
- Distributed by: HBO
- Release date: 2008
- Running time: 34 minutes
- Country: United States
- Language: English

The Conscience of Nhem En is a 26-minute documentary directed by Steven Okazaki, telling the stories of three survivors of the Tuol Sleng Prison. Also known as S-21, Tuol Sleng was where 17,000 Cambodians were imprisoned and killed in the late 1970s. The film follows a young soldier responsible for taking the ID photos of thousands of people before they were tortured and murdered by the Khmer Rouge. The documentary was nominated for an Oscar for Best Documentary Short.

== Overview ==
Nhem En was 16 years old when he was the staff photographer at the Tuol Sleng Prison, also known as Security-21, where from 1975 to 1979 approximately 17,000 people were registered and photographed, then imprisoned and tortured before being killed. Only seven people are documented to have walked out of S-21 alive. Three of them tell their stories in the film. Bou Meng, 34 years old at the time, survived because the prison needed an artist to paint portraits of Khmer Rouge leader Pol Pot. Chum Mey, 42 at the time, survived because he could fix sewing machines. Chim Math, 20 at the time, does not know why she survived.
