= James D. Houston =

American novelist, poet and editor

- Born: James Dudley Houston; November 10, 1933; San Francisco, California, U.S.
- Died: April 16, 2009 (aged 75); Santa Cruz, California, U.S.
- Education: Lowell High School; Stanford University
- Occupations: Novelist; poet; editor
- Spouse: Jeanne Wakatsuki
- Writing career
- Notable awards: American Book Award (1983, 1999)

James Dudley Houston (November 10, 1933 – April 16, 2009) was an American novelist, poet and editor. He wrote nine novels and a number of non-fiction works (some co-authored and/or edited).

== Early life ==
Houston was born in San Francisco, where his parents had migrated from Quanah, Texas, a small town named for the noted last Comanche war chief, Quanah Parker. The story behind the town's name kindled Houston's interest in treks and history. He graduated from Lowell High School. He did college studies at San José State University and Stanford University. At San José State, Houston met Jeanne Wakatsuki, his future wife. Her parents had immigrated to California from Japan.

== Literary career ==
Houston co-authored his wife's autobiographical memoir, Farewell to Manzanar, about her family's experiences in the Manzanar internment camp during World War II. The book became a bestseller after it was published in 1973.

Houston was the winner of two American Book Awards for Californians: Searching for the Golden State (1983) and The Last Paradise (Literature of the American West) (1999) and a Joseph Henry Jackson Award for fiction. The NBC film of Farewell to Manzanar won a Humanitas Prize for writing in 1977.

Houston's historical novel Snow Mountain Passage (2001) was inspired by a personal link to the ill-fated Donner Party of early Californian history. A second historical novel, Bird of Another Heaven (2007), explores California's beginnings, based on the history of Nani Keala, daughter of a Native American mother and Native Hawaiian father. She was one of a small group who went up the Sacramento River with John Sutter in 1839 and helped build the eponymous fort.

== Works ==
- Between Battles (1968)
- Gig (1969)
- A Native Son of the Golden West, Ballantine Books (1972)
- Farewell to Manzanar, with Jeanne Wakatsuki Houston (1972)
- An Occurrence At Norman's Burger Castle (1972)
- The adventures of Charlie Bates (1973)
- Three Songs for My Father (1974)
- Continental Drift (1978)
- California Heartland: Writing from the Great Central Valley, with Gerald W. Haslam (1978)
- West Coast Fiction: Modern Writing from California, Oregon, and Washington, editor (1979)
- Gasoline: The automotive adventures of Charlie Bates (1980)
- Californians: Searching for the Golden State (1982)
- One Can Think About Life After the Fish Is in the Canoe: And Other Coastal Sketches/Beyond Manzanar: Views of Asian-American Womanhood, with Jeanne Wakatsuki Houston (1985)
- Love Life (1985)
- The Men in My Life: And Other More or Less True Recollections of Kinship (1987)
- Surfing : the sport of Hawaiian kings (1996)
- In the Ring of Fire: A Pacific Basin Journey (1997)
- Farewell to Manzanar with Connections, with Jeanne Wakatsuki Houston (1998)
- The Last Paradise (Literature of the American West) (1998)
- Snow Mountain Passage (2001)
- The Literature of California, Volume 1: Native American Beginnings to 1945, editor (2001)
- Hawaiian Son, with Eddie Kamae (2004)
- Bird of Another Heaven (2007)
- Where Light takes its Color From the Sea (2008)
- A Queen's Journey (2011)

== Death ==
Houston died on April 16, 2009, at age 75, of complications of lymphoma, in Santa Cruz, California.
