= Victor Drai =

Franco-American nightclub owner

- Born: July 25, 1947 (age 79); Casablanca, Morocco
- Occupations: Nightclub owner; entrepreneur; film producer
- Spouses: Kelly LeBrock (m. 1984; div. 1986) Loryn Locklin (m. 1990; div. 1998) Yolanda Krupiarz (m. 2016)
- Partner: Jacqueline Bisset (1973–1980)
- Children: 4
- Website: draisgroup.com

Victor Drai (born July 25, 1947) is a Moroccan French American nightclub owner, entrepreneur and film producer. Drai rose to prominence in the 1980s, producing the movies The Woman in Red (1984) and Weekend at Bernie's (1989), before leaving the industry to open a string of high-profile restaurants and nightclubs.

== Early life ==
Drai was born in Casablanca, Morocco, to Jewish parents. He dropped out of school at 14 to move to Paris, France, with his family. In 1968, he launched a ready-to-wear line called Vicadam, which featured velvet jeans.

In 1974, Drai met Jacqueline Bisset on a flight from Los Angeles to Paris and the two began a transatlantic relationship. Drai sold the fashion line and relocated to the United States to be with Bisset and began a new business flipping Beverly Hills mansions.

== Film production ==
In 1982, Drai and then-girlfriend Kelly LeBrock traveled to Paris where they saw the movie Pardon Mon Affaire. With the help of David Begelman, Drai produced a remake titled The Woman in Red which was released in 1984. Based on that movie's success, Drai then produced a series of comedies including another French remake, The Man with One Red Shoe (1985), and Weekend at Bernie's (1989).

In 1985, Victor Drai Productions had set up a two-year, non-exclusive pact with MGM/UA Entertainment Co., whereas the first of the film projects were set up for the start of the fall of 1985, and represent the directorial debut of actor Henry Winkler.

== Restaurants and nightclubs ==
In 1993, Drai made the decision to open a restaurant, which he felt would be a more family-friendly career. He contracted French chef Claude Segal, who'd replaced Wolfgang Puck at the upscale restaurant Ma Maison in 1985. With Segal, he opened the restaurant Drai's at 730 La Cienega Boulevard on Restaurant Row in Los Angeles.

In 1995, Drai opened a second Drai's in Las Vegas. A couple years later, he started an afterhours club, "That started everything", Drai stated. In December 2013, he opened a steakhouse on Sunset Boulevard in Los Angeles called Rare by Drai's.

In March 2010, he opened Drai's Hollywood, a rooftop restaurant, pool and nightclub at the W Hotel in Hollywood.

In 1997, Drai opened Drai's restaurant on the Las Vegas Strip. Two years later, Drai added a nightclub to the restaurant, re-branding it Drai's After Hours. In Vegas Seven's 2012 Nightclub Awards, Drai's After Hours won "Best Place to Disappear". He currently operates Drai's After Hours nightclub at The Cromwell Las Vegas.

In 2007, Drai took over La Bete at Wynn Las Vegas and re-branded it Tryst. In 2012, Vegas Seven's Nightclub Awards awarded Tryst "Best Place to Impress". In 2013, Tryst placed #8 in the Top 100 Nightclub & Bar Roster for Nightclub & Bar Magazine.

Drai opened XS nightclub at Encore Las Vegas in 2008. In 2010, XS won Nightclub & Bar Awards for "New Club of the Year" and "Mega-Club of the Year. " In 2013, Nightclub & Bar Magazine awarded XS the "Mega-Club of the Year. " Technomic named XS number one nightclub in the US for 2010. In 2010, Drai was bought out of his managing partnership at Steve Wynn's Tryst and XS to pursue other endeavors.

On March 2, 2017, he opened Drai's Vancouver which was located inside Trump International Hotel & Tower Vancouver. The club closed down in September 2018.

He opened Drai's Beachclub & Nightclub, on Memorial Day weekend 2014, at The Cromwell Las Vegas. This 65,000-square-foot venue has a party pool and an indoor/outdoor club spread out over two levels on top of the new Cromwell Hotel. Drai also opened a beach club and a nightclub in Dubai and plans to expand his empire to other cities.

Drai is one of sixteen professionals listed in the Nightclub Hall of Fame.

== Personal life ==
Drai was a romantic and business partner of Jacqueline Bisset's from 1973 to 1980. Drai has been married three times. In 1984, he married Kelly LeBrock; their marriage ended two years later in 1986. His second marriage was in 1990 to Loryn Locklin. On April 24, 2016, he married his third wife, Yolanda Krupiarz.

== Filmography ==
He was a producer in all films unless otherwise noted.

=== Film ===
Year	Film	Credit
1984	The Woman in Red	
1985	The Man with One Red Shoe	
1985	The Bride	
1989	Weekend at Bernie's	
1992	Folks!	
1993	Weekend at Bernie's II	
2016	The Last Film Festival	Co-producer

As an actor

Year	Film	Role
1997	An Alan Smithee Film: Burn Hollywood Burn	Himself
