= Allen H. Eaton =

American crafts scholar

Allen Hendershott Eaton

Personal details
- Born: 10 May 1878 Union, Oregon
- Died: 7 December 1962 (aged 84) New York City
- Party: Republican
- Spouse: Cecile Dorris (m. 1903–1962)
- Children: Elizabeth and Martha
- Education: University of Oregon
- Occupation: teacher; politician; writer; art historian

Allen H. Eaton (1881–1970) was an American crafts scholar and politician who became a staff member of the Department of Surveys and Exhibits of the Russell Sage Foundation.

He studied at the University of Oregon where he joined the faculty in 1915. He was elected to the Oregon State legislature and curated the Oregon Art Room for the 1915 international Panama–Pacific International Exposition in San Francisco. In 1917 he was expelled from the faculty of the university for being a pacifist, something that Upton Sinclair later wrote about in his defense. The scandal caused him to lose his reelection in 1918 as a representative for Eugene.

He left Oregon for New York City "the next day" and got a position with the American Federation of Arts. His 1919 Buffalo, New York exhibition Arts and Crafts of the Homelands drew almost fifty thousand visitors. After the death of John C. Campbell in 1919 he took his place as field secretary for the Russell Sage Foundation, which resulted later in his Handicrafts of the Southern Highlands in 1937. In 1942 he was shocked at the treatment of Japanese-Americans through Roosevelt's Executive Order 9066, and resolved to do something to help the internees remind themselves and the rest of America of their contributions. He had already written about the group in his 1932 Immigrant Gifts to American Life. His vision during the war was to have exhibitions on American arts and crafts travel from relocation center to relocation center, but he could not find sponsors for such an undertaking. He was determined to survey them for his work on American crafts however and visited several centers himself, impressed especially by miniature "gardens" and "home" decorations made from scrap and other local materials. This work resulted in his "Beauty behind Barbed Wire". During the project he was gifted many articles for use in a large permanent exhibition that never transpired. Among the artefacts was work by artist Estelle Peck Ishigo.

He was acknowledged as an early collector and admirer of Grandma Moses by her agent Otto Kallir. At the end of his life, Eaton was working on a book about Moses and her farming subjects. In 1951 he had helped organize an exhibition of 25 works by her which included a catalog and an essay he wrote about her work. The year before Eaton died in 1961, the centenarian artist gifted him a double-sided painting showing scenes of a "Flax Farm", after having given a painting of a colonial-style farm called "Home Sweet Home" to his daughter Martha the year before. Eaton claimed he had known Grandma Moses "before she got famous" and had previously purchased a "Thanksgiving Turkey" painting by her in 1942.

== Notable works ==
- The Oregon system, the story of direct legislation in Oregon; a presentation of the methods and results of the initiative and referendum, and recall, in Oregon, with studies of the measures accepted or rejected, and special chapters on the direct primary (1912)
- Immigrant Gifts to American Life: Contributions of Our Foreign-Born Citizens to American Culture (1932)
- Handicrafts of the Southern highlands: With an Account of the Rural Handicraft Movement in the United States and Suggestions for the Wider Use of Handicrafts in Adult Education and in Recreation, with illustrations by Doris Ulmann, (1937), on Russell Sage Foundation website
- Handicrafts Of New England (1949) on archive.org
- Grandma Moses : twenty-five masterpieces of primitive art (1951)
- Beauty Behind Barbed Wire: The Arts of the Japanese in Our War Relocation Camps (1952)
