= The Mushroom Club =

2005 film

- Directed by: Steven Okazaki
- Production company: Farallon Films
- Release date: 2005
- Country: United States
- Language: English

The Mushroom Club is a 2005 documentary short subject, directed by Steven Okazaki.

The short film is about the nuclear bomb dropped on Hiroshima and its effects on the residents of that city sixty years later.

In January 2006 it was nominated for the Academy Award for Best Documentary Short Subject. It lost to A Note of Triumph: The Golden Age of Norman Corwin.
