= Prison film =

Film genre focused on prisons

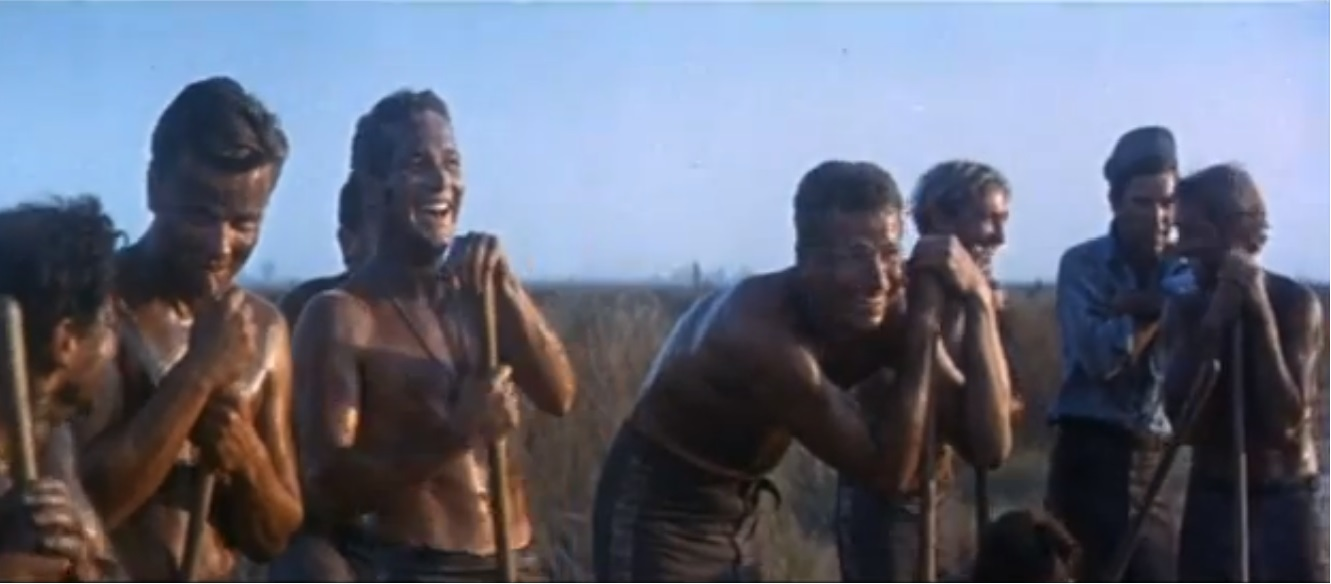
A scene from Cool Hand Luke, a prison film.

A prison film is a film genre concerned with prison life and often prison escape. These films range from dramas examining the nature of prisons, such as A Man Escaped, Cool Hand Luke, Midnight Express, Brubaker, Escape from Alcatraz, The Shawshank Redemption, and Kiss of the Spider Woman to actioners like Lock Up and Undisputed, and even comedies satirizing the genre like Stir Crazy, And God Created Woman, Life, and Let's Go to Prison. Prison films have been asserted to be "guilty of oversimplifying complex issues, the end result of which is the proliferation of stereotypes". For example, they are said to perpetuate "a common misperception that most correctional officers are abusive", and that prisoners are "violent and beyond redemption".

== Themes ==
Themes repeatedly visited in prison films include escape attempts, gang activities inside the prison, efforts of wrongly convicted persons to prove their innocence, and guard and management cruelty. An entire subgenre of films exists where the toughest prisoners are permitted (or forced) to engage in boxing matches or martial arts bouts, replete with high-stakes wagering on the outcomes. Prison films set during war have become a popular subgenre known as prisoner of war film. These various theme elements may be meshed together, where for example a prisoner forced to fight uses the occasion to plan an escape.

== Media and societal perception ==
Journalist Paul Mason argued that generally, it is argued that fictionalized representations of prison have not contributed to public understanding of prison life and do not contribute positively in the direction of improving it. This is because the entertainment television industry has transformed crime and jail into entertaining objects, thus eroding our doubts and concerns about prison as a solution for crime reduction.

In 1979, the film Scum led to reforms of prisons and borstals in the UK.

== See also ==
- List of prison films
- Women in prison film
