= Fortress 2: Re-Entry =

- Official DVD cover
- Directed by: Geoff Murphy
- Written by: Troy Neighbors; Steven Feinberg
- Produced by: John Davis; John Flock
- Starring: Christopher Lambert; Pam Grier
- Cinematography: Hiro Narita
- Music by: Christopher Franke
- Production companies: Gower Productions; The Carousel Picture Company; John Flock Productions
- Distributed by: TriStar Pictures
- Release dates: March 3, 2000 (Australia); April 25, 2000 (United States)
- Running time: 92 minutes
- Countries: United States; Luxembourg
- Language: English
- Budget: $10 million

Fortress 2: Re-Entry is a 2000 science fiction action film directed by Geoff Murphy. It is the sequel to 1992's Fortress and the second installment in the Fortress film series. In the film, the principal actor Christopher Lambert reprises his role as John Henry Brennick, still on the run from the MenTel Corporation. Lambert was the only original actor to reprise his role; Loryn Locklin, who played Karen B. Brennick from the first film, did not return for the sequel and she was played by Beth Toussaint.

Fortress 2: Re-Entry was released by TriStar Pictures in Australia on March 3, 2000 and in the United States on April 25, 2000.

== Plot ==
Ten years after the events of the first film, John Brennick is somewhere in North America, still on the run from Men-Tel and living in the rural mountains. His son Danny tells him to come home immediately. When they arrive, there are three people waiting for them. They ask John to help them destroy Men-Tel's new power station, saying that the company is on the verge of collapse and "without their power, they have no power". John refuses, wanting to protect his family, so the trio leave on a boat. As John waves goodbye, two Men-Tel helicopters appear and John scrambles his family's escape plan. He sends Danny and Karen through an underground passage, while he leads the soldiers on a wild goose chase. The battle ends with one helicopter destroyed and Brennick's Jeep overturned.

John is then knocked out and captured. He wakes up in a room with a disembodied voice telling him that he is in prison again and has been sentenced to death. He has been implanted with a behavior modification device which causes headaches of varying intensity when prisoners enter prohibited areas. These range from mild to incapacitating, eventually killing the individual if the infraction was deemed severe enough. He also finds one of the men who visited him, a former Men-Tel vice president, who is now brain-damaged because of an improperly planted device. Another of John's visitors, a former soldier, is also in the jail and friends with one of the guards.

Brennick starts making enemies almost immediately. A video of Director Teller "welcomes" the new prisoners. He shows them a female prisoner receiving her death sentence, being blown out into space through an airlock. The video then shows the prisoners that their new prison is actually a space station orbiting the Earth which is used to generate power via a solar array.

Brennick tries to escape in a water-delivery shuttle but is caught and sent to "The Hole" - an exposed area of the ship where John is bombarded with solar radiation while the station faces the sun and extreme cold when its orbit takes it behind the Earth. When Men-Tel's president arrives he tries to kill John by jettisoning him without a spacesuit. John manages to hold his breath and propel himself towards another airlock and back into the prison. Due to the sudden decompression, the computerized warden, Zed, begins to malfunction and cannot perform its duties. John uses a prison gun to destroy the computer and Teller is subsequently electrocuted. John and all his friends board the Shuttle and head back to Earth, where John reunites with his family.

== Cast ==
- Christopher Lambert as John H. Brennick (Note: In the film, when John wakes up aboard the space station and is charged with his crimes, the computer refers to him as "Brennick, John W." instead of "Brennick, John H.")
- Beth Toussaint as Karen B. Brennick, John's wife (Note: In the above scene, the computer refers to Karen as "Brennick, Karen", without referring to a middle initial.)
- Liz May Brice as Elena Rivera
- Aidan Ostrogovich as Danny Brennick
- Nick Brimble as Max Polk
- Willie Garson as Stanley Nussbaum
- Patrick Malahide as Prison Director Peter Teller
- Yuji Okumoto as Sato
- Pam Grier as Susan Mendenhall

== Production ==
Prior to the film's release, it was reported that Davis Entertainment Company and Village Roadshow Pictures had hired Troy Neighbors and Steven Feinberg to write a treatment for Fortress 2 with Christopher Lambert slated to return and production to commence in early 1994. The sequel was set to film in Australia on an estimated $15 to 20 million budget with production set to begin in August 1994. Worldwide distribution rights, excluding Australia and New Zealand, were initially acquired by 20th Century Fox at the 1995 American Film Market. However in March 1998, after languishing in development hell, Columbia TriStar boarded the project as co-producers and acquired distribution rights following Fox bowing out of the project.

== Release ==
=== Home media ===
The film was released direct-to-video in the United States on April 25, 2000 by Columbia TriStar.

== Reception ==
=== Critical response ===
Almar Haflidason of the BBC said: "[It's] a film that sorely lacks energy [and] various moments of action are ruined by poor camera angles and clumsy editing, [but] while it may lack the grand set of Fortress, it does boast some reasonable CGI effects and is slightly more entertaining in a cheap kind of way". Kim Newman of the British Film Institute's Sight & Sound said the film "lacks [Fortress director Stuart Gordon's] wit and grit, though director Geoff Murphy makes it a decent enough ride".

Nathan Shumate of Cold Fusion Video Reviews said the film is "at best, a pale imitation of the original Fortress. [...] On its own, it's a passable movie, with an adequate budget both for sets and CGI space effects. Too bad it had to be a sequel to a superior movie, instead of something wholly its own". The Science Fiction, Horror, and Fantasy Film Review said: "The action scenes are run of the mill [and] the special effects are okay and the show at least mounts to a passable action climax as the space station explodes, [but] the scripters have not endeavoured to approach this film in any more intelligent a way than they did the original".

== See also ==
- List of films featuring space stations
