= Taking Care of Business (film) =

1990 comedy film directed by Arthur Hiller

- Theatrical release poster by Drew Struzan
- Directed by: Arthur Hiller
- Written by: Jill Mazursky; J. J. Abrams
- Produced by: Geoffrey Taylor
- Starring: James Belushi; Charles Grodin; Anne De Salvo; Mako; Veronica Hamel; Héctor Elizondo
- Cinematography: David M. Walsh
- Edited by: William H. Reynolds
- Music by: Stewart Copeland
- Production companies: Hollywood Pictures; Silver Screen Partners IV
- Distributed by: Buena Vista Pictures Distribution
- Release date: August 17, 1990
- Running time: 108 minutes
- Country: United States
- Language: English
- Budget: $15 million
- Box office: $20 million

Taking Care of Business (theatrically released in the United Kingdom as Filofax) is a 1990 American comedy film directed by Arthur Hiller and starring James Belushi and Charles Grodin. It is named after the song by Randy Bachman, recorded by the Canadian rock group Bachman–Turner Overdrive. The film is also known for being the first screenplay written by J. J. Abrams, who would make several blockbuster films, including Super 8 and Star Wars: The Force Awakens.

The film follows a work-obsessed businessman who loses his Filofax, which is found by a recent prison escapee who assumes his identity, moves into his home, and proceeds to mess up his business dealings.

== Plot ==
Convicted car thief and passionate Chicago Cubs fan Jimmy Dworski wins tickets to the World Series. Unfortunately, he still has a couple of days to serve in prison, and the warden Frank Toolman will not trust him to leave and come back. With help from the other inmates, Jimmy stages a prison riot so he can sneak out of prison to see the game. On the way, he finds the Filofax of stuffy and arrogant advertising executive Spencer Barnes, who promises a reward if it is found.

Over the next day, Jimmy takes on Barnes's identity, staying in the Malibu beach house of Spencer's boss, flirting with the boss's daughter and attending a meeting with a powerful Japanese food company magnate named Sakamoto. The fake "Spencer"'s uncouth behavior, such as beating the magnate at tennis and telling him about the poor quality of his food products, gets the attention of Sakamoto. However, his unconventional negotiations with the food company insult some of the executives, seemingly ruining Spencer's reputation.

Meanwhile, lacking his precious Filofax, the real Spencer Barnes is struggling to cope. Losing all his clothes, his car and money, he has to rely on an old high school flame, the neurotic and talkative Debbie Lipton, who keeps trying to rekindle a relationship with him.

Finally, Jimmy and Spencer come together at a meeting with the advertising executives, where Spencer's boss finally pushes him over the edge for Jimmy's work, and Spencer quits. As a consolation, Jimmy takes Spencer to the World Series, where Jimmy makes a spectacular catch on a home-run ball hit by Mark Grace (who makes a cameo).

When security goes after Jimmy, who was spotted on the Jumbotron, they escape by using Spencer's Filofax to slide down a support wire and out of the stadium. Spencer patches up his marriage with his wife, who had become intolerant with his workaholic lifestyle. Jimmy sneaks back into prison with Spencer's help, serves his last couple of hours and is released, but finds Spencer waiting. With the promise of a beautiful girlfriend and a well-paying job in an advertising business with Spencer, Jimmy's future looks bright, as the Cubs win the World Series.

== Cast ==
- James Belushi as Jimmy Dworski / Spencer Barnes
- Charles Grodin as Spencer Barnes
- Anne De Salvo as Debbie Lipton
- Loryn Locklin as Jewel Bentley
- Stephen Elliott as Walter Bentley
- Mako as Mr. Sakamoto
- Veronica Hamel as Elizabeth Barnes
- Héctor Elizondo as Warden Frank Toolman
- Gates McFadden as Diane Connors
- John de Lancie as Ted Bradford Jr.
- Thom Sharp as Mike
- Andre Rosey Brown as "Heavy G"
- Burke Byrnes as Prison Guard

== Production ==
Baseball scenes for Taking Care of Business were filmed at Angel Stadium of Anaheim in California.

The film is notable for featuring John de Lancie and Gates McFadden together in scenes who were also in the Star Trek: The Next Generation television series.

== Reception ==
The film grossed $20 million in the United States.

Review aggregator website Rotten Tomatoes reported that 33% of critics have given the film a positive review, based on 15 reviews, with an average rating of 3.1/10. On Metacritic, the film holds a weighted average score of 42 out of 100 based on 18 critics, indicating "mixed or average" reviews. Audiences polled by CinemaScore gave the film an average grade of "A−" on a scale of A+ to F.

Caryn James of The New York Times labeled it as a film that "plays it safe and boring".

Jonathan Rosenbaum of the Chicago Reader wrote, "This is a pretty stupid comedy in spots, with holes wide enough to drive trucks through, and director Arthur Hiller is as clunky as ever, but the cast is so funny and likable that they almost bring it off in spite of itself."

Michael Wilmington of the Los Angeles Times wrote, "As a comedy, ‘Taking Care of Business’ has everything going for it but laughs. It's like a stand-up comic who invested his sense of humor in the Sunbelt Jokes Savings and Loan: It hasn't got a million of them." He also wrote, "There's something eerie about this movie: a kind of mix-and-match Trading Places, a cross-town Midnight Run with an Odd Couple who never meet."

== See also ==
- List of American films of 1990
- List of baseball films
