= The Manzanar Fishing Club =

- Directed by: Cory Shiozaki
- Written by: Richard Imamura
- Produced by: Alan Sutton; Cory Shiozaki; Richard Imamura; Lester Chung; John Gengl
- Narrated by: Scott Sutton; Bonnie Perkinson; Philip Friedman; Rachel Garcia
- Release date: March 30, 2012
- Running time: 74 minutes
- Country: United States

The Manzanar Fishing Club is a documentary film about a fishing club at the Manzanar Relocation Center.

== Synopsis ==
The documentary is about a fishing club at Manzanar, which was located in the Owens River Valley in California. Fishermen imprisoned in the camp realized that the river nearby was a good place to fish for trout, and they would sneak out regularly to do so.

== Criticism ==
Many reviewers said that while it was a unique perspective on the internment experience, the film spent a significant amount of time talking about bait, rods, and other gear.
