= Loryn Locklin =

American actress

- Born: November 3, 1968 (age 57); Burbank, California, US
- Occupation: Actress
- Spouse: Victor Drai (m. 1990; div. 1998)
- Children: 1

Loryn Locklin (born November 3, 1968) is an American actress. She is best known for Catch Me If You Can and Fortress.

== Career ==
In 1990, Locklin starred in Wes Craven's TV movie Night Visions as psychic criminal profiler Dr. Sally Powers. She starred in the 1993 film Fortress and appeared in Taking Care of Business and Denial, among others. She has also appeared in a few television shows, such as Frasier, JAG and Home Improvement.

Locklin was married to producer/restaurateur Victor Drai from 1990 to 1998; they had a child in 1993.

== Filmography ==
=== Films ===
Year	Film	Role	Notes
1989	Catch Me If You Can	Melissa Hanson	
1990	Taking Care of Business	Jewel Bentley	
1993	Fortress	Karen B. Brennick	
1998	Denial	Art's Date	
1999	Operation Splitsville	Estelle	

=== Television ===
Year	Title	Role	Notes
1990	Night Visions	Dr. Sally Powers	Television movie
1991	Shoot First: A Cop's Vengeance	Lea	Television movie
1992	The Human Factor	Gwenn	Two Episodes
1996	Abducted: A Father's Love	Andrea Costner	Television movie
1997	Home Improvement	Robin	Episode "Taps"
1998	The Perfect Getaway	Sarah	Television movie
1998–2004	JAG	Jill Waddington	Three Episodes
1999	The Rockford Files: If It Bleeds... It Leads	Cindy Carteret	Television movie
1999	Frasier	Sabrina	Episode "Father of the Bride"
