= Night Visions (film) =

1990 television film directed by Wes Craven

- Genre: Mystery; Thriller
- Written by: Wes Craven; Thomas Baum
- Directed by: Wes Craven
- Starring: Loryn Locklin; James Remar
- Music by: Brad Fiedel
- Original language: English

Production
- Executive producer: Wes Craven
- Producers: Thomas Baum; Marianne Maddalena; Rick Nathanson
- Cinematography: Peter Stein
- Editors: James Coblentz; Mark Melnick
- Running time: 92 minutes
- Production companies: Wes Craven Films; MGM Telecommunications

Original release
- Network: NBC
- Release: November 30, 1990

Night Visions is a 1990 American made-for-television supernatural thriller film co-written and directed by Wes Craven.

== Plot ==
The film opens with Ray sitting in a club, angrily watching Aura dancing provocatively with other men in the club. Ray angrily removes her from the dance floor. Following a short fight, she storms out to take the car home. In the parking lot, Aura is choked to death with a hose . Her corpse is left on the ground, with her legs spread apart.

The papers report that the "Spread-Eagle Killer" has struck a fourth time and Ray is brought in as a suspect for questioning, during which he is treated roughly by an overly suspicious Sergeant Thomas Mackey. The extremely intuitive Dr. Sally Powers, a specialist in criminal psychopathology, is brought in to give insight into the mind of the killer. Mackey is allowed to forego a ten-day suspension and to continue to work on the case if he agrees to supervise Dr. Powers. At the scene of the next murder Dr. Powers writhes on the floor in the tape outline of the victim and announces that the victim was raped. That night in bed Dr. Powers relives a murder she survived as a child.

The next morning, she is called in to the station to meet with the captain but instead has a hunch that leads her to a health club. She emulates the behavior of the instructors in order to take over a class when the next body is found in another room in the club. After an argument with Mackey she predicts the location of the next murder to be a biker bar. Mackey follows her and finds her in a back room with a knife in her hand next to a freshly murdered woman. The victim was not stabbed, though, but rather beaten with a blunt object. Mackey apologizes to her at a diner, where he witnesses her emulate the behavior of their waitress. She begins to think like the killer and Mackey encourages this but she becomes scared and runs away.

The commissioner explains to Mackey that Dr. Powers is the survivor of an attack by a man who killed her family. She survived by hiding in a closet but now jumps into the personalities of others to escape her own tortured mind. Dr. Powers plots the murders on a map in the shape of Da Vinci's Vitruvian Man and determines that the killer is piecing together a perfect woman. She tracks the killer down but is led to the edge of a rooftop for a final showdown between her, the killer, and Mackey. The killer tries to murder them both, but ends up falling from the roof to his death.

== Cast ==
- James Remar as Sergeant Thomas Mackey
- Loryn Locklin as Dr. Sally Powers
- Penny Johnson Jerald as Luanne
- Francis X. McCarthy as Commissioner Nathan Dowd
- Mitch Pileggi as Captain Keller
- Jon Tenney as Martin
- Bruce MacVittie as Starks
- Angela Alvarado as Aura
- Kristen Corbett as Young Sally
- Timothy Leary as New Age Minister
- Olivia Barash as The Singer
