= David Ono =

American journalist

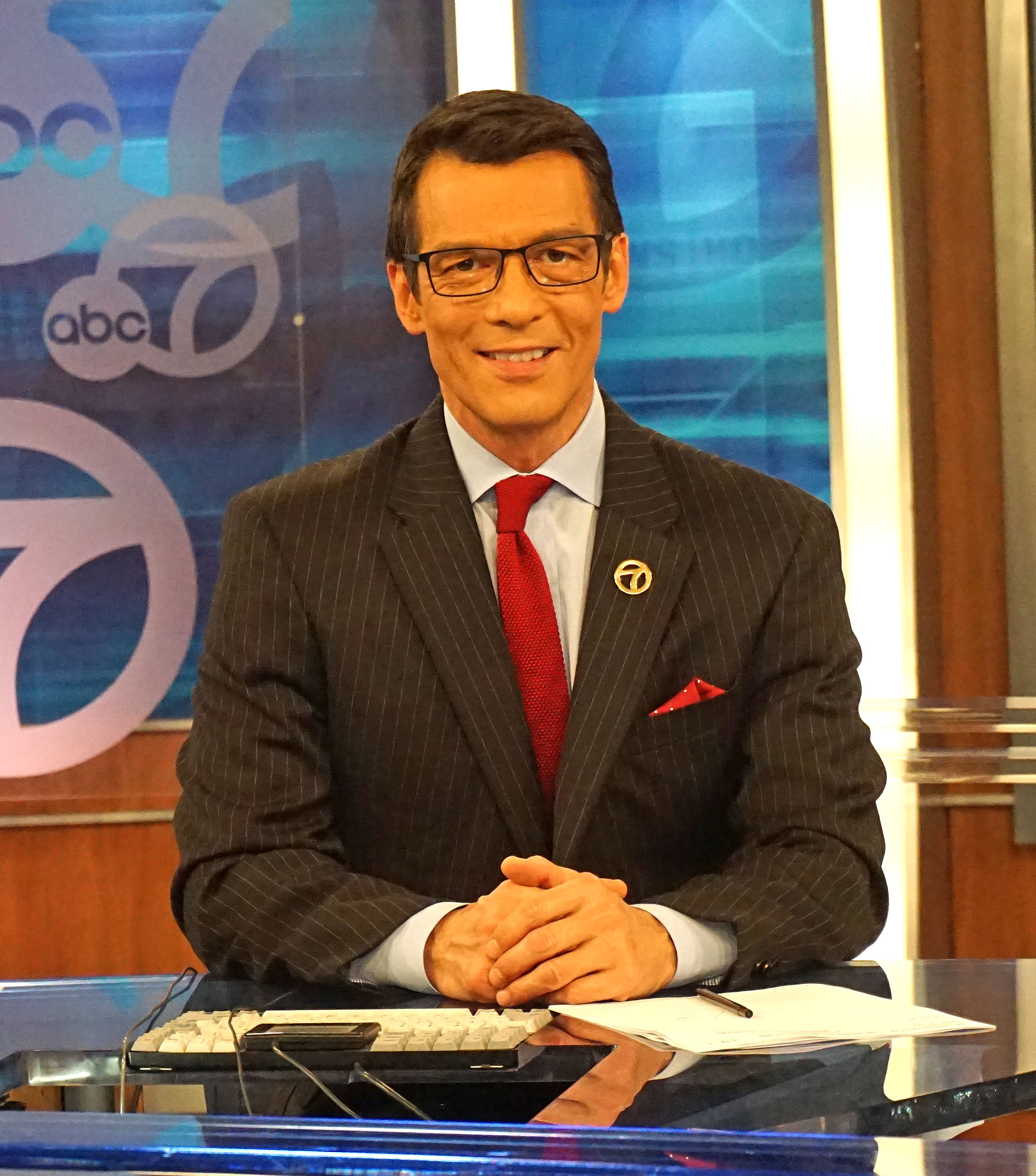
David Ono ABC7 By Patti Hirahara March 26, 2015

David Ono (February 5, 1963) is a Japanese American filmmaker and news anchor for KABC-TV Channel 7 in Los Angeles, California. He is the co-anchor for ABC7 Eyewitness News at 4 and 6 p.m. with Jovana Lara. He also fills in for co-anchor Marc Brown at 5 and 11 P.M.

== Early life ==
Born David Johnston in Japan to a Japanese mother and a Caucasian father, Ono moved to the United States with his family at age one. Raised in San Antonio, Texas, he attended the University of North Texas.

Ono stated that he had little contact with his Asian roots as his mother died young and he was raised in a community that was either Caucasian or Latino. Since moving to California he has embraced his biracial heritage and became involved in the Asian American Journalists Association. He adopted the last name Ono, his mother's maiden name, professionally during the early 1990s.

== Career ==
Ono has also worked at KOVR in Sacramento, California, KDBC-TV in El Paso, Texas, KOSA-TV in Midland/Odessa, and KXAS-TV in Dallas. Having joined ABC's Los Angeles O&O KABC-TV in 1996, he has interviewed President Barack Obama and covered major international events, including the Boston Marathon bombing, the wedding of Prince William and Catherine Middleton, Hurricane Katrina, the 2010 Haiti earthquake and the 2011 Tōhoku tsunami. With Ono and sports anchor Rob Fukuzaki, ABC7 Eyewitness News is one of the few news programs in the country with two Asian American male anchors.

Outside of broadcasting, Ono has produced several documentaries chronicling the Asian American and immigrant experience, such as the internment of Japanese Americans during World War II and Phan Thi Kim Phuc, the "Napalm girl" from the Vietnam War. He and Jeff MacIntyre created the documentary The Legacy of Heart Mountain about the Japanese internment camp Heart Mountain Relocation Center. In the documentary he personally interviewed a number of survivors, including the mother of judge Lance Ito.

== Awards ==
Ono has won three Edward R. Murrow Awards and 16 Emmys. In December 2015 he was honored by the Los Angeles chapter of the Society of Professional Journalists with the Distinguished Journalist Award.

In 2022, Ono received Japan's Order of the Rising Sun, Gold Rays with Rosette for his work promoting understanding of Japan in the United States and for his work within Japanese American community.

== Personal ==
Ono has a daughter, Kaia, with his partner, Laura Ise.
