= Loni Ding =

American filmmaker and activist

- Born: 8 June 1931
- Died: 20 February 2010 (aged 78); Oakland
- Occupation: Filmmaker, television producer, university teacher
- Employer: University of California, Berkeley
- Awards: Guggenheim Fellowship (film, 1982)

Isadora Quanehia Ding Welsh (June 8, 1931 – February 20, 2010), known professionally as Loni Ding, was a documentary film maker, director, television series producer, activist, and university educator. She is known for her work exploring the experiences of Asian Americans. Notably, two of her films played a critical role in the passage of the Civil Liberties Act of 1988 which granted reparations to Japanese Americans who were incarcerated during World War II.

== Early life ==
Ding grew up in San Francisco, initially living Chinatown where her parents ran an herb shop. Her parents were originally from Guangdong, China. Ding was the youngest of seven children. According to Ding, at this time, she would notice the differences between Asian Americans and white individuals living in San Francisco, and she would think about how she navigated between those different spaces, sparking her interest in Asian American issues and studying the Asian American experience.

== Career ==
Ding studied at the University of California, Berkeley, receiving a master's degree in sociology. She taught as a lecturer in the university's sociology department between 1958 and 1967.

Between 1980 and 2009, she taught film and media analysis in the Asian American Studies Program at the Ethnic Studies Department of the University of California, Berkeley. She also taught as a visiting faculty member at Cornell University in 1991, New School for Social Research in New York City in 1999, and Mills College. She was also Distinguished Visiting professor at the University of California, Santa Cruz in 1998.

Ding was a prolific television producer. She also worked on productions with organizations such as the California Historical Society, the California State Department of Education, Chinese for Affirmative Action, the San Francisco Opera Center, and KQED-TV.

She produced many films that documented early Asian immigrant stories including Nisei Soldier in 1984 and Ancestors in the Americas in 1997—she was one of the first directors to do so.

She co-founded media and arts organizations including the Center for Asian American Media (CAAM) and helped establish the Independent Television Service (ITVS).

She was awarded a Guggenheim Fellowship in 1982, an American Film Institute Directors Fellowship in 1983, and a Rockefeller Foundation Film/Video Fellowship in 1994.

In 2011, the Center for Asian American Media (CAAM) in association with the Asian American Journalists Association established the Loni Ding Award In Social Issue Documentary award "in memory of Loni Ding’s spirit and vision for creating media about the Asian American experience."

She died on February 20, 2010, in Oakland, California, following a stroke.

== Awards ==
- Rockefeller Foundation, Intercultural Film/Video Fellowship, 1994
- 20th Anniversary Honoree, Chinese for Affirmative Action, SF, 1989
- Media Alliance, Meritorious Achievement (Film/Video), SF, 1989
- Artist's Award, State of California Arts Council, 1988
- National Japanese American Citizens League, Legislative Education Committee Award, 1988
- James D. Phelan Award for Video, SF, 1988
- Asian CineVision, Annual Filmmaker's Award, NY, 1988
- Award of Honor, San Francisco Arts Commission, 1987
- Asian Cultural Council, US/Japan Fellow, NY, 1986
- Association of Asian Pacific American Artists Media Award, LA, 1985
- Steven Tatsukawa Memorial Fund Award, LA, 1985
- American Film Institute Director's Fellowship, LA, 1983
- University Plaque of Honor, Syracuse University, 1983
- John Simon Guggenheim Fellowship, 1982
- San Francisco State University, Broadcast Preceptor Award, 1981
- Corporation for Public Broadcasting Senior Producer's Fellowship, 1980
