= Jeff MacIntyre =

American film producer

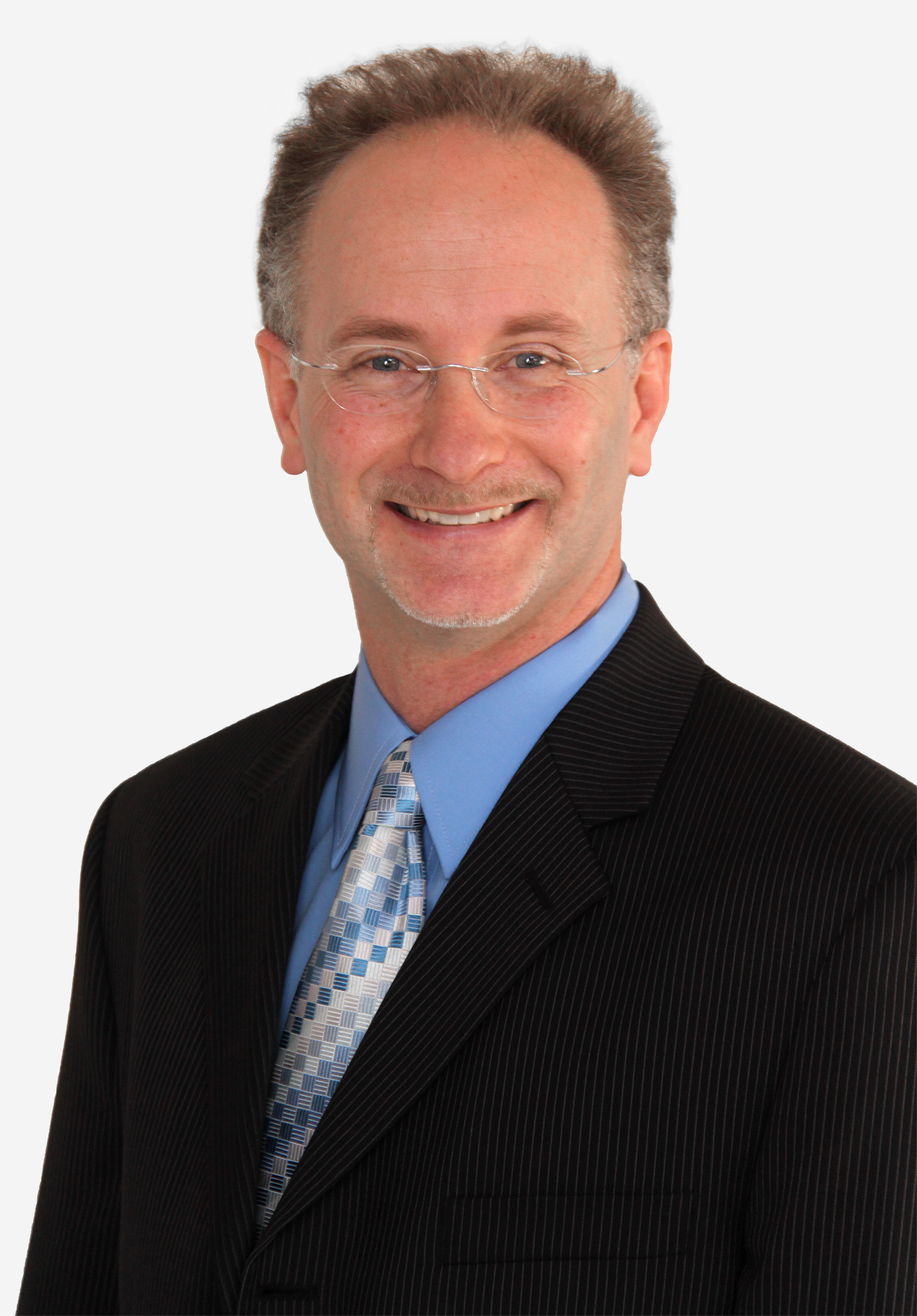
- TV Producer, Jeff MacIntyre

Jeff MacIntyre is an American television producer, cameraman and editor known for documentaries and his work with ABC News. Since 1990, he has owned the Los Angeles–based production company, Content Media Group.

== Awards ==
Jeff MacIntyre won all five categories he was nominated for at the 2018 Los Angeles Emmy Awards on July 28, 2018.

He also received two Los Angeles Emmy Award Awards in July, 2014 for The Legacy of Heart Mountain, in the categories of Outstanding Editor, Programming and Outstanding Videographer, Programming. In total, he has been nominated 51 times and has won 21 Los Angeles Emmy Awards in addition to 10 Edward R. Murrow Awards for his work with ABC News.

== See also ==
- David Ono
