= Jeanne Wakatsuki Houston =

American writer (1934–2024)

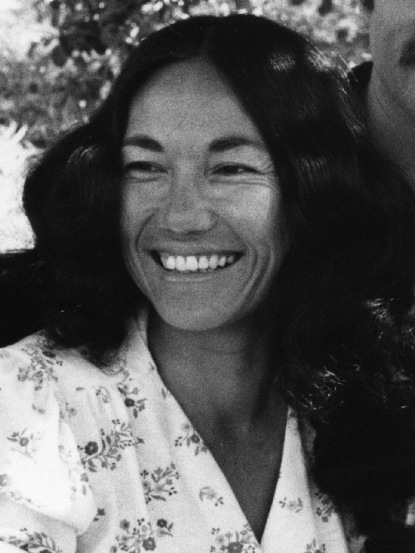
- Born: Jeanne Toyoko Wakatsuki; September 26, 1934; Inglewood, California, U.S.
- Died: December 21, 2024 (aged 90); Santa Cruz, California, U.S.
- Education: San Jose State University
- Spouse: James D. Houston (m. 1957; died 2009)
- Writing career
- Notable work: Farewell to Manzanar

Jeanne Toyo Wakatsuki Houston (Japanese: 若槻 トヨ子, September 26, 1934 – December 21, 2024) was an American writer. Her writings primarily focused on ethnic identity formation in the United States of America, the experience of Japanese American incarceration, and navigating biculturalism. She is best known for her memoir Farewell to Manzanar that narrates her personal experiences in World War II incarceration camps. The book has been credited with sharing the story of the Japanese American incarceration with generations of young people.

== Life and career ==
Jeanne Toyo Wakatsuki was born in Inglewood, California, on September 26, 1934. She was the youngest of four boys and six girls in the Wakatsuki family. For the first seven years she experienced an unremarkable childhood. She lived in Santa Monica and Los Angeles, California until 1942 when President Roosevelt signed Executive Order 9066, causing her and her family to be incarcerated.

Wakatsuki and her family were forced to leave their home and were taken to the internment camp at Manzanar, which was located in California's Owens Valley, on the eastern side of the Sierra Nevada mountains. They were transported in large Greyhound buses from Los Angeles to Manzanar, a drive that takes about 4 hours today but much longer in 1942 when the highway system had not yet been built. At the time she was seven years old. She did not understand what was happening because she had no concept of war. She and her family spent the next three and a half years in the camp, attempting to live a "normal" life behind barbed wire, under the watch of guards in searchlight towers.

Conditions in the camp were awful and sickness spread throughout the camp quickly. This can be attributed to the compactness of the camp and the unpreparedness of the camp leading to facilities and supplies inadequate to need. Nearly 10,000 inmates lived in a 500-acre square, and this caused a lot of illness. Adapting to the climate was also difficult. Winters were very cold, and summers were very hot. The food they were provided was canned military food. It was not uncommon for prisoners to not eat because the food was not the traditional food they were accustomed to. Water in the camp was unclean, and it often caused dysentery. Despite their efforts, the strains of living in a prison camp under harsh conditions took a psychological toll on the family: Wakatsuki's father became an alcoholic, his physical state deteriorated, he became aggressive and abusive, the family bonds began to disintegrate, and the lack of freedom, rudimentary shacks, dirty latrines, and limited space caused strains.

In her book, Farewell to Manzanar, Jeanne describes the living conditions when they arrived, "After dinner we were taken to Block 16, a cluster of fifteen barracks that had just been finished a day or so earlier—although finished was hardly a word for it. The shacks were built of pine planking covered with tarpaper. They sat on concrete footings, with about two feet of open space between the floorboards and the ground. Gaps showed between the planks, and as the weeks passed and the green wood dried out, the gaps widened. Knotholes gaped in the uncovered floor.”

She goes on to explain the size and layout of the barracks. They were divided into six units that were 16 feet long by 20 feet wide, with a single light bulb hung from the ceiling. They had an oil stove for heat as well as two army blankets each, some mattress covers and steel army cots. However, things eventually improved, and they learned to adapt to their environment.

A key figure in the book is Jeanne's father Ko, a proud "Issei" (first-generation Japanese American) man, who descends to alcoholism and violence in the face of his humiliating position but who tries to remain the ultimate authority in his family.

Several years after leaving the camp in 1945, Jeanne attended Long Beach Polytechnic High School for three years and graduated from James Lick High School in San Jose. She went to San Jose State College (now San Jose State University) where she studied sociology and journalism and participated in the marching band's flag team. She met her husband James D. Houston there, and they married in 1957. Jeanne later decided to tell her story about the time she spent in Manzanar in Farewell to Manzanar, co-authored by her husband, in 1972. Ten years after their marriage, in 1967, Jeanne gave birth to a girl. Six years later she gave birth to twins.

Houston received many awards for her writing as well as her influence, and for being a voice for Japanese American women. A partial list of her awards can be found at https://www.californiamuseum.org/inductee/jeanne-wakatsuki-houston

Other publications include Don't Cry, It's Only Thunder (1984) with Paul G. Hensler as co-author, and Beyond Manzanar and Other Views of Asian-American Womanhood (1985).

Houston died at her home in Santa Cruz, California on December 21, 2024, at the age of 90.

== Farewell to Manzanar ==
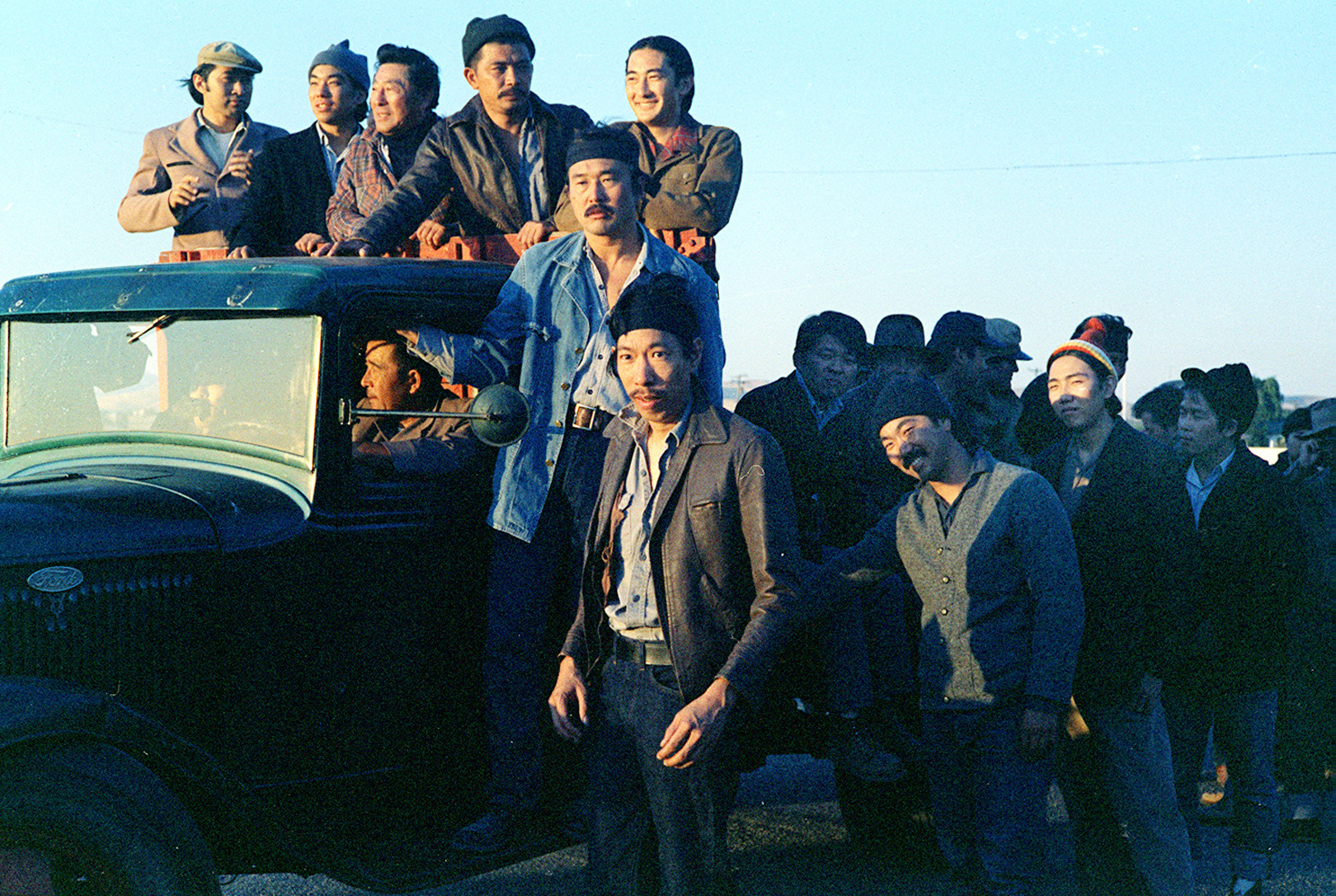
A photo from the set of the 1976 film of Farewell to Manzanar

In her book Farewell to Manzanar (1973), Houston writes about her family's experiences at Manzanar, an internment camp in California's Owens Valley where Japanese Americans were imprisoned during World War II. Jeanne was inspired to write the book when her nephew, who was born in Manzanar, began to learn about it in college and wanted to know more about the place he was born. Her husband, James, co-authored the book. He believed it was not just a book for their family but for the whole world. He would be proven correct, as today it has sold over one million copies.

The novel was adapted into a television movie in 1976, starring Nobu McCarthy, who portrayed both Houston as well as her mother in the film.

== Distribution ==
In an effort to educate Californians about the experiences of Japanese Americans who were imprisoned during World War II, the book and movie were distributed in 2002 as part of a kit to approximately 8,500 public elementary and secondary schools and 1,500 public libraries in California. The kit also included study guides tailored to the book, and a video teaching guide. Today, Farewell to Manzanar has sold over one million copies.

== See also ==
- List of Asian American writers

== Critical studies ==
1. "National and Ethnic Affiliation in Internment Autobiographies of Childhood by Jeanne Wakatsuki Houston and George Takei" By: Davis, Rocío G.; Amerikastudien/American Studies, 2006; 51 (3): 355–68. (journal article)
2. "'But Isn't This the Land of the Free?': Resistance and Discovery in Student Responses to Farewell to Manzanar" By: Chappell, Virginia A.. pp. 172–88 IN: Severino, Carol (ed. and introd.); Guerra, Juan C. (ed. and introd.); Butler, Johnnella E. (ed. and introd.); Writing in Multicultural Settings. New York, NY: Modern Language Association of America; 1997. xi, 370 pp. (book article)
3. "The Politics of Possession: The Negotiation of Identity in American in Disguise, Homebase, and Farewell to Manzanar" By: Sakurai, Patricia A.. pp. 157–70 IN: Okihiro, Gary Y. (ed. & introd.); Alquizola, Marilyn (ed.); Rony, Dorothy Fujita (ed.); Wong, K. Scott (ed.); Privileging Positions: The Sites of Asian American Studies. Pullman: Washington State UP; 1995. xiii, 448 pp. (book article)
4. "The Politics of Possession: Negotiating Identities in American in Disguise, Homebase, and Farewell to Manzanar" By: Sakurai, Patricia A.; Hitting Critical Mass: A Journal of Asian American Cultural Criticism, 1993 Fall; 1 (1): 39–56. (journal article)
