= Skouras Pictures =

American independent movie distribution company

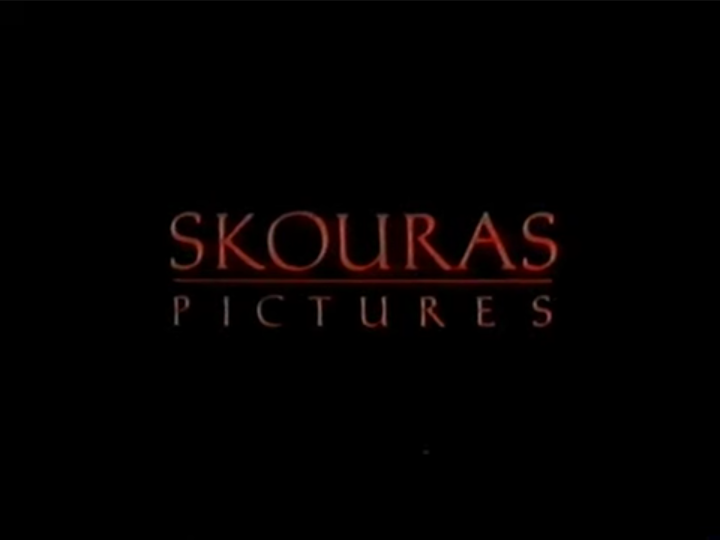
- Logo seen in the foreign print of the movie Jackals (1986)
- Industry: Film distribution
- Founded: 1983; 43 years ago
- Founder: Tom Skouras
- Defunct: August 1996; 29 years ago
- Headquarters: New York City, United States

Skouras Pictures was an American independent movie distribution company that was founded by Tom Skouras in 1983. The company distributed more than 200 movies between 1983 and 1995, including notable films as Blood Simple, My Life as a Dog, The Comfort of Strangers and Apartment Zero.

In 1985, after two years as a foreign sales firm, Skouras Pictures decided to expand to U.S. distribution. According to Pamela Pricking, who was an executive at Skouras Pictures, and sales director Sigrid Ann Davison, the company had presented a dozen films at the MIFED Film Festival in 1986, and they stated that it would be looking for bigger films, particularly in regional countries like Germany, England and Scandinavia.

That same year, Kelly Neal joined Skouras Pictures as president of domestic distribution. Also that year, Skouras made a reedited version of Shadey, which received negative reviews. In the late 1980s, independent film executive Jeff Lipsky briefly joined Skouras Pictures as head of acquisitions, marketing and distribution before he quit to start October Films. In 1991, the company was among the smallest studios to refuse to attend the Cannes Film Festival.

On July 9, 1990, the company had inked a distribution pact with Paramount Home Video to release their titles on videocassette. In 1992, it launched their home video distribution label Skouras Home Video, with Paramount themselves serving as distributor. In 1993, it distributed the controversial Shannon Tweed erotic thriller Cold Sweat, which had a short-lived theatrical release before going to home video.

In 1995, Skouras Pictures decided to end film distribution, following some scrambling after an attempt to make the company public. In 2000, Skouras Pictures was relaunched with the acquisition of the independent arthouse film The Truth About Tully, and had plans to release six titles annually.

== See also ==
- Fox Theatre (St. Louis)
