= Unfinished Business (1985 American film) =

- Directed by: Steven Okazaki
- Produced by: Jane Kaihatsu (associate producer); Steven Okazaki (producer)
- Starring: Fred Korematsu; Gordon Hirabayashi; Min Yasui; Amy Hill (narrator)
- Cinematography: Steven Okazaki
- Edited by: Steven Okazaki
- Release date: March 1986 (Los Angeles)
- Running time: 60 min.
- Country: United States
- Language: English

Unfinished Business is a 1985 documentary film directed and produced by Steven Okazaki.

== Summary ==
The film centers on Min Yasui, an attorney from Oregon, Gordon Hirabayashi, a Quaker college student in Washington, and Fred Korematsu, a San Francisco welder, and how their lives were affected by Japanese American internment during World War II.

== Accolades ==
The film was nominated for the Academy Award for Best Documentary Feature for 1986.
