= Farewell to Manzanar =

Book by Jeanne Wakatsuki Houston

- 1983 edition
- Author: Jeanne Wakatsuki Houston, James D. Houston
- Language: English
- Subject: Japanese American internment
- Genre: Non-fiction
- Publisher: Houghton Mifflin
- Publication date: 1973
- Publication place: United States
- Media type: Print (Hardback & Paperback)
- Pages: 177
- ISBN: 0-913374-04-0
- OCLC: 673358

Farewell to Manzanar is a memoir published in 1973 by Jeanne Wakatsuki Houston and James D. Houston. The book describes the experiences of Jeanne Wakatsuki and her family before, during, and following their relocation to the Manzanar internment camp due to the United States government's internment of Japanese Americans during World War II. It was adapted into a made-for-TV movie in 1976 starring Yuki Shimoda, Nobu McCarthy, James Saito, Pat Morita, and Mako.

== Synopsis ==
Jeanne Wakatsuki (the book's narrator) is a Nisei (child of a Japanese immigrant). At age seven, Wakatsuki—a native-born American citizen—and her family were living in Ocean Park (a neighborhood of Santa Monica, California). After the US entered World War II, her father was arrested on trumped up charges of using his fishing vessel to fuel Japanese submarines and he was sent to a prison at Fort Lincoln in North Dakota. They did not see him again for nine months and upon his return he looked like he had aged 10 years and he had a limp from frostbite and beatings in prison. After he was arrested the family moved to Terminal Island, where there was ready work processing fish that the mother could do to support the family in a Japanese ghetto.

Soon after, she and the rest of her family were imprisoned at Manzanar (an American internment camp), where 11,070 Americans of Japanese ancestry and their immigrant parents—who were prevented from becoming American citizens by law—were confined during the Japanese American internment during World War II. The book describes the Wakatsukis' experiences during their imprisonment and events concerning the family before and after the war.

Ko Wakatsuki (Jeanne's father) emigrated from Japan to Honolulu, Hawaii and then to Idaho. He met his wife while studying law in Seattle.

On the morning of December 7, 1941, Jeanne Wakatsuki says farewell to her father's sardine fleet at San Pedro Harbor. By the time the boats return, news reaches the family that the Japanese have bombed Pearl Harbor in Hawaii. Jeanne's father burns his Japanese flag and various papers but is arrested by the FBI and beaten when taken to jail. Jeanne's mother moves the family to the Japanese ghetto on Terminal Island, and then to Boyle Heights in Los Angeles. On February 19, 1942, President Roosevelt signs Executive Order 9066 giving the military authority to relocate those posing a potential threat to national security. Americans of Japanese descent await their final destination; “their common sentiment is shikata ga nai” ("it cannot be helped”). A month later the government orders the Wakatsukis to move to the Manzanar Relocation Center, in the desert 225 miles northeast of Los Angeles.

At the camp, the Japanese Americans find cramped, frigid, unsanitary living conditions, badly prepared food, unfinished barracks, and dust blowing in through every crack and knothole. There is not enough warm clothing to go around; many fall ill from poorly preserved food and unclean water, and they face the indignity of non-partitioned camp toilets (which particularly upsets Jeanne's mother). The Wakatsukis stop eating together in the camp mess hall, and the family begins to disintegrate. Jeanne, virtually abandoned by her family, takes an interest in the other people in camp and studies religion with two nuns. However, after she suffers sunstroke when imagining herself a suffering saint, her father orders Jeanne to stop.

Woody (Jeanne's brother) wants to preserve his family's honor by joining the U.S. Army. After joining (and fighting in the Pacific theater) he visits his father's Aunt Toyo, who gave his father money for the trip to Hawaii. After the visit, Woody feels a new pride in his ancestry. He becomes the man of the family, leading them early in their internment.

When Jeanne's father returns from his imprisonment in the Fort Lincoln Internment Camp, the family is hesitating how to greet him as his appearance and his demeanor are changed; only Jeanne welcomes him openly. She has always admired her father (who left his samurai family in Japan to seek a better fortune in the United States), and remembers how he conducts himself—from his courtship of Jeanne's mother to his legal knowledge to his dentistry skills and his pig-carving.

Something happened, however, during his time in prison (where government interrogators accused him of disloyalty and espionage); he went into a downward emotional spiral. He becomes violent and drinks heavily, nearly striking Jeanne's mother with his cane before Kiyo (Jeanne's youngest brother) punches their father in the face.

The men's frustration eventually results in the December Riot, which breaks out after three men are arrested for beating a man suspected of helping the government. The rioters roam the camp searching for inu (both “dog” and “traitor” in Japanese). The military police try to stop the riot; in the chaos they shoot into the crowd, killing two of the prisoners and wounding ten others. That night, a patrol group accosts Jeanne's brother-in-law, Kaz, and his fellow workers and accuses them of sabotage. The mess-hall bells ring until noon the following day, as a memorial to the dead.

Soon after, the government requires a loyalty oath to distinguish loyal Japanese from potential enemies. Opinion about whether to take the oath is divided. Answering “no” to the loyalty questions could result in deportation but there is talk of deporting the camp residents to Japan regardless, where a "yes" answer could result in execution in wartime Japan. A second question about whether the person is willing to fight in the US military results in some wanting to fight to prove their loyalty while others do not want to fight for a country while their family is imprisoned and they have lost their home and livelihood. Jeanne's father and Woody answer “yes”, and Papa attacks a man for calling him an inu. That night Jeanne overhears her father singing the Japanese national anthem, "Kimigayo", whose lyrics speak of the endurance of stones.

After the riot, camp life calms down; the Wakatsuki family moves to a nicer barracks near a pear orchard, where Jeanne's father takes up gardening. Manzanar begins to gain some of the features of a typical American town: schools open, residents are allowed short trips outside the camp, and Jeanne's oldest brother Bill forms a dance band called the Jive Bombers. She explores the world inside the camp, trying out Japanese and American hobbies before taking up baton twirling. Jeanne returns to her religious studies and is about to be baptized when her father intervenes. She begins to distance herself from him, but the birth of a grandchild draws her parents closer together than ever.

By the end of 1944, the number of people at Manzanar dwindles; men are drafted, and families take advantage of the government's new policy of allowing families to relocate and work away from the west coast. Woody is drafted and, despite his father's protests, leaves in November to join the all-Nisei 442nd Combat Regiment. While in the military, Woody visits his father's family in Hiroshima. He meets Toyo, his father's aunt, and finally understands his father's pride. In December, the U.S. Supreme Court rules that the internment policy is illegal and the War Department prepares to close the camps. The remaining residents, fearing the future, postpone their departure but eventually are ordered to leave. Jeanne's father decides to leave in style, buying a broken-down blue sedan to ferry his family back to Long Beach.

In Long Beach, the Wakatsukis move into public housing, Cabrillo Homes. Although they fear public hatred, they see little sign of it. On the first day of sixth grade, however, a girl in Jeanne's class is amazed at Jeanne's ability to speak English; this makes Jeanne realize that prejudice is not always open and direct. She later becomes close friends with the girl (Radine, who lives in the same housing project). The two share the same activities and tastes, but when they reach high school subtle prejudice keeps Jeanne from the social and extracurricular success available to Radine.

Jeanne retreats into herself, and nearly drops out of school; however, when her father moves the family to a berry farm in San Jose she decides to make another attempt at school life. Her homeroom nominates her queen of the school's annual spring carnival, and for the election assembly, she leaves her hair loose and wears an exotic sarong. Although the teachers try to prevent her from winning, her friend Leonard Rodriguez exposes the teachers’ plot and ensures her victory. Jeanne's father, however, is furious that she won the election by flaunting her sexuality before American boys. He forces her to take Japanese dance lessons, but she soon quits. As a compromise, Jeanne wears a conservative dress to the coronation ceremony; however, the crowd's muttering makes her realize that neither the exotic sarong nor the conservative dress represents her true self.

In April 1972, Jeanne revisits Manzanar with her husband and three children. She needs to remind herself that the camp actually existed; over the years, she began to think she imagined the whole thing. Walking through the ruins, the sounds and sights of the camp come back to her. Seeing her eleven-year-old daughter, Jeanne realizes that her life began at the camp (as her father's life ended there). She remembers him driving crazily through camp before leaving with his family, and finally understands his stubborn pride.

== Distribution ==
The non-fiction book has become a curriculum staple in schools and universities across the United States. In an effort to educate Californians about the experiences of Japanese Americans who were confined in American internment camps during World War II, the book and the movie were distributed in 2002 as a part of a kit to approximately 8,500 public elementary and secondary schools and 1,500 public libraries in the state. The kit included study guides tailored to the book and a video teaching guide.

On October 7, 2011, the Japanese American National Museum (JANM) announced that it had negotiated the rights for the 1976 NBC-produced film directed by John Korty; it was made available for purchase from JANM.
