= Days of Waiting: The Life & Art of Estelle Ishigo =

Days of Waiting
- Directed by: Steven Okazaki
- Written by: Steven Okazaki
- Produced by: Steven Okazaki; Cheryl Yoshioka
- Narrated by: Dorothy Stroup; Lynn O'Donnell
- Cinematography: Steven Okazaki
- Edited by: Steven Okazaki; Cheryl Yoshioka
- Production company: Mouchette Films
- Distributed by: PBS
- Release date: 1991
- Running time: 28 minutes
- Country: United States
- Language: English

Days of Waiting (1991) is a documentary short film directed, written and produced by Steven Okazaki about Estelle Ishigo, a Caucasian artist who went voluntarily to an internment camp for Japanese Americans during World War II. The film was inspired by Ishigo's book, Lone Heart Mountain, and won an Academy Award for Best Documentary (Short Subject) and a Peabody Award. It was presented on PBS by POV and the Center for Asian American Media.

== Background ==
During World War II, when 110,000 Japanese Americans were forcibly relocated from the West Coast to various American concentration camps, Estelle Peck Ishigo refused to be separated from her Nisei (second generation Japanese American) husband. She voluntarily accompanied him to the Heart Mountain War Relocation Center. A painter and illustrator, Ishigo documented her experience through her art. She later published these works and wrote about her experience in her book, Lone Heart Mountain, which along with personal papers, were the basis of the film. She was discovered living in destitution in her senior years by the filmmakers as they researched her story.

== Awards ==
- Academy Award for Best Documentary (Short Subject) – 63rd Academy Awards (1991)
- Peabody Award – as presentation in PBS TV series, P.O.V. (1991)
- Gran Prix, Clermont-Ferrand International Short Film Festival (1991)
