= Pros & Cons =

- Directed by: Boris Damast
- Written by: Larry Miller
- Starring: Larry Miller; Tommy Davidson; Delroy Lindo
- Cinematography: Jonathan Brown
- Edited by: Daniel Loewenthal
- Music by: Michel Colombier
- Production companies: Abandon Pictures; Film Farm
- Distributed by: New Line Home Entertainment
- Release date: 1999
- Running time: 104 minutes
- Country: United States
- Language: English

Pros & Cons (sometimes written as Pros and Cons) is a 1999 crime cоmedy film starring Larry Miller (who also wrote the screenplay), Tommy Davidson, and Delroy Lindo. The broadcast rights wеrе purchased by Cinemax who aired the debut of the film in 1999 on their cable network. It was directed by Boris Damast. Аfter its cable debut, it was released on video in 2001 by Warner Home Video under the New Line Home Entertainment imprint.

This was the final film appearance of actor Darren McGavin.

In the film, an imprisoned white-collar criminal is convinced that his computer skills can be useful for a prison escape.

== Plot ==
Miller plays Ben Babbitt, an accountant who is imprisoned for financial crimes. Davidson plays his cellmate Ron Carter. Ben is endeared to Kyle, a powerful prisoner who convinces Ben to use his computer expertise to help them escape from prison.

== Primary cast ==
- Larry Miller .... Ben Babbitt
- Tommy Davidson .... Ron Carter
- Delroy Lindo .... Kyle Pettibone
- Darren McGavin .... Mr. Stanford
- David Rasche .... Jack Stanford
- Christine Ebersole .... Kathy Stanford
- Wayne Knight .... Wayne the Guard
- Julie Warner .... Eileen
- Terry Sweeney .... Decorator
