= Japanese Relocation =

1942 film by Milton S. Eisenhower

- Japanese Relocation
- Directed by: Milton S. Eisenhower
- Written by: Milton S. Eisenhower
- Produced by: Office of War Information
- Starring: Milton S. Eisenhower
- Narrated by: Milton S. Eisenhower
- Distributed by: War Activities Committee of the Motion Picture Industry
- Release date: November 12, 1942
- Running time: 9 minutes 40 seconds
- Country: United States
- Language: English

Japanese Relocation is a 1942 short film produced by the U.S. Office of War Information and distributed by the War Activities Committee of the Motion Picture Industry. It is a propaganda film, justifying and explaining Japanese American internment on the West Coast during World War II. It is narrated by Milton Eisenhower.

The film starts by asserting that, while many Japanese-Americans were loyal, in early 1942 the West Coast was a potential combat zone, and the government did not know what the Japanese population would do if the US were invaded. Furthermore, the film noted that there were Japanese-American communities near militarily significant sites, such as shipyards and air bases.

So, the film states, the Japanese were democratically and humanely evacuated to relocation centers in the desert. The film also states that most Japanese went voluntarily, and felt that it was a sacrifice they should make as loyal citizens.
