= List of artists who created paintings and drawings for use in films =

In order for artwork to appear in film or television, filmmakers must go through a process of acquiring permission from artists, their estates or whoever the owner of the photographic rights may be, lest they become embroiled in a potential lawsuit, such as was the case for Warner Bros. with sculptor Frederick Hart following the reproduction of his piece Ex Nihilo in Devil's Advocate, as well as with the designer of Mike Tyson's face tattoo following its reproduction in The Hangover Part II. For this reason, more often than not, actors portraying artists are shown with work created by a professional painter, comics artist or sculptor specifically for a film or series, and galleries may frequently display artwork created for the project or otherwise in the public domain.

The following is a list of notable artists who contributed artwork specifically for feature films and television.

Name	Artwork	Film	Note(s)
Ivan Albright	The Picture of Dorian Gray	The Picture of Dorian Gray	the painting is now part of the art collection of the Art Institute of Chicago
Ari Aster	drawing of Paimon and roughly half of Charlie's drawings	Hereditary	Aster also wrote and directed the film
Juliette Binoche	Dina's paintings	Words and Pictures	Binoche stars in the film as Dina Delsanto
Greg Bogan	paintings in the style of Jean-Michel Basquiat	Basquiat	
Robert Brackman	portrait of Jennifer Jones	Portrait of Jennie	
John Bratby	paintings	The Horse's Mouth	
John Bratby	paintings and drawings	Mistral's Daughter	
James Cameron	Jack's drawing of Rose	Titanic	Cameron also served as the film's writer, director and producer
Francesco Clemente	Finn's paintings and drawings	Great Expectations	
Daniel Clowes	Jonah's paintings	Art School Confidential	Clowes also served as the film's screenwriter and co-producer, and had created the short comic on which the film was based
Chuck Connelly	paintings for "Life Lessons" segment	New York Stories	
Sophie Crumb	Enid's sketchbook art	Ghost World	Sophie, the daughter of R. Crumb and Aline Kominsky, was only 19 at the time she contributed her art, as artist/co-writer Daniel Clowes didn't believe he could "draw like a girl."
Salvador Dalí	dream sequence	Spellbound	
Hélène Delmaire	paintings and sketches	Portrait of a Lady on Fire	Delmaire's hands were featured in the film
Sam Demke	roughly half of Charlie's drawings	Hereditary	Demke also designed all of Charlie's toys
Sam Demke	Chevalier's paintings	Gentlemen Broncos	
Bridget Duffy	Pawnee City Hall murals	Parks and Recreation	
John Ferren	Sam Marlowe's paintings	The Trouble with Harry	
John Ferren	Portrait of Carlotta	Vertigo	the location of this artwork is currently unknown
Carole Feuerman	Nancy Miller's sculptures and artwork	Compromising Positions	
Ed Harris	Pollock's paintings	Pollock	Harris trained himself to paint for his role as Jackson Pollock in the film
Dean Haspiel	comics page with a character yelling "Give It up!"	American Splendor	
Jon Heder	Napoleon's drawings	Napoleon Dynamite	Heder stars in the film as Napoleon Dynamite
Richard Kitchin	portraits of Mary Meredith	The Uninvited	the sitter was Elizabeth Russel
Richard Kitchin	portrait of Cathy Downs	The Dark Corner	
Richard Kitchin	portrait of Ann Todd	So Evil My Love	
John McDermott	paintings	Loving	the film was based on McDermott's novel
Shawn McManus	comic book cover	Tales from the Crypt	
Henrique Medina	Portrait of Hurd Hatfield as Dorian Gray	The Picture of Dorian Gray	sold at Christie's for $149,000 in 2015
Caitlin Mitchell-Dayton	Jerome's paintings and drawings	Art School Confidential	
Viggo Mortensen	David's paintings	A Perfect Murder	Mortensen stars in the film as David Shaw
Mark Mothersbaugh	Marvin's paintings	Art School Confidential	
Zoë Mozert	pinup artwork	Never Say Goodbye	
Zoë Mozert	painting of Jane Frazee	Calendar Girl	
Stan Olexiewicz	Pawnee City Hall murals	Parks and Recreation	
Sherwin Ovid	Anthony's paintings	Candyman	
Dan Panosian	Uncanny X-Men comic book covers and pages	Logan	comics were created after Marvel permitted James Mangold to use X-Men comics in the film as long as they weren't real issues
Robert Andrew Parker	Vincent van Gogh paintings	Lust for Life	
Joe Quesada	Uncanny X-Men comic pages	Logan	did the pencil work on four pages that were subsequently inked/colored/lettered by Dan Panosian
Man Ray	portraits	Pandora and the Flying Dutchman	
Tom Richmond	Bounty Law Mad and TV Guide covers in the style of Jack Davis	Once Upon a Time in Hollywood	Mad would later use this cover for their October 2019 issue that included a full parody comic illustrated by Richmond, while a "Collector's Edition" Blu-ray release of the film would contain a "Mini-Mad" with an entirely new cover and comic illustrated by Richmond
Jean-Marc Rochette	portraits of life on the last railcar	Snowpiercer	Rochette was the artist for the graphic novel the film was based on
John Romita Jr.	"Wall of Villains" portraits	Kick-Ass	Romita Jr. was one of the creators of the Kick-Ass comic series the film was based on
Julian Schnabel	paintings in the style of Jean-Michel Basquiat	Basquiat	Schnabel also wrote, directed and composed music for the film
Daryush Shokof	paintings Daryush Shokof	Seven Servants (film)|Seven Servants	Daryush Shokof also wrote, directed, and designed the production for the film
Mike Sekowsky	Woody's art	Condorman	
William Shulgold	portrait of Ronald Colman	A Double Life (1947)	
Billy Sullivan	paintings and drawings	As Good as It Gets	
Mike Vosburg	comic book covers	Tales from the Crypt	
Richard Williams	Gordy's Home parody Mad magazine cover	Nope	Williams had been a prolific cover artist for Mad for several decades
Richard Williams	Barbara Novak parody Mad magazine cover	Down with Love	Williams had been a prolific cover artist for Mad for several decades
Bodhi Wind	paintings	3 Women	
Ann Wood	Wark's artwork	Junebug	
Jaroslav Gebr	Joan Crawford Portrait	Night Gallery	Premiere Episode: 1969 'Eyes'
