= A Hunger Artist =

- Short story by Franz Kafka
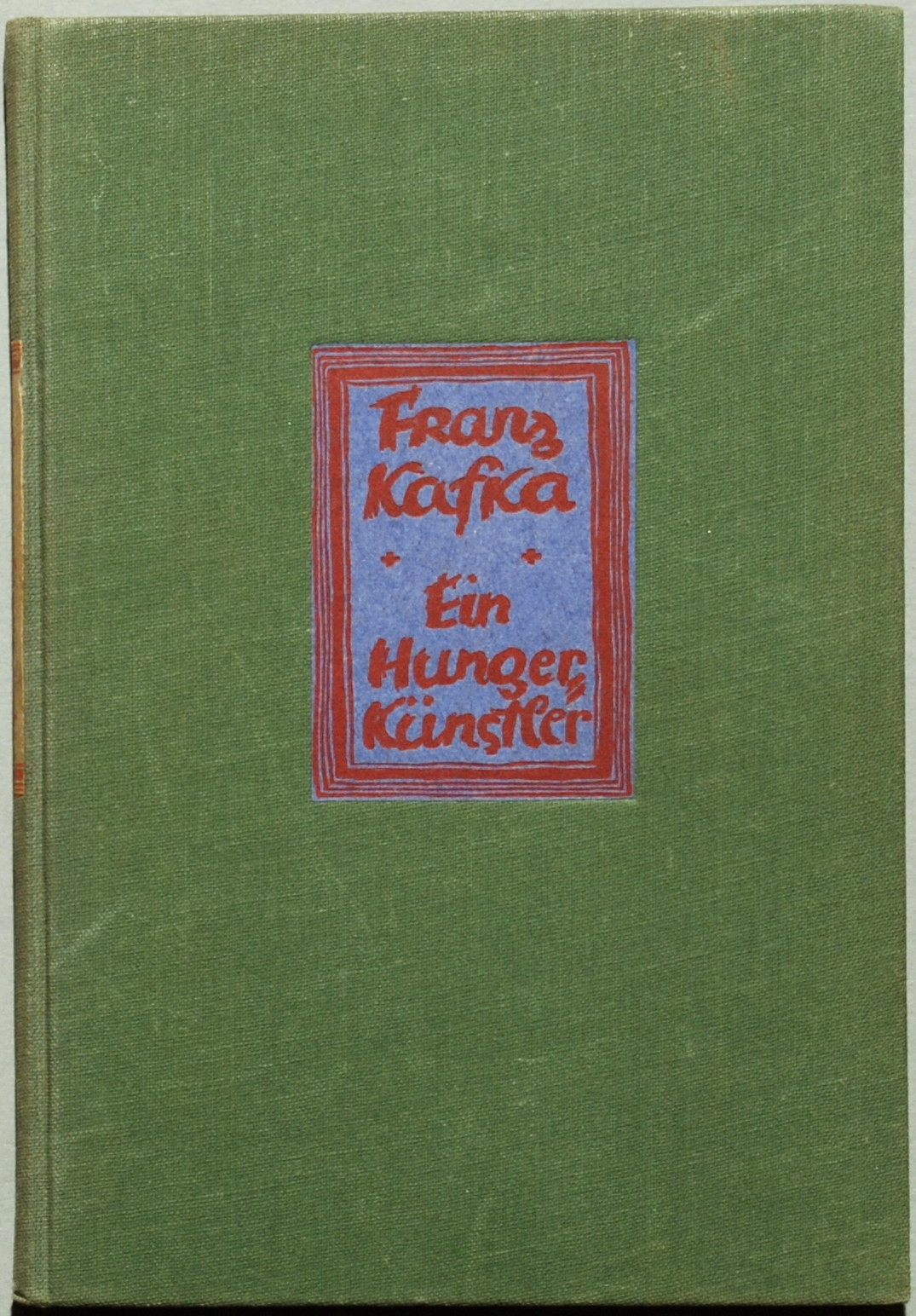
- 1924 edition

Text available at Wikisource

Text available at German Wikisource
- Original title: Ein Hungerkünstler
- Translator: H. Steinhauer and Helen Jessiman (1938); Willa and Edwin Muir (1948)
- Country: Germany (written in Austria-Hungary)
- Language: German
- Genre: Short story

Publication
- Published in: Die neue Rundschau
- Publication type: periodical
- Publication date: 1922
- Published in English: 1938

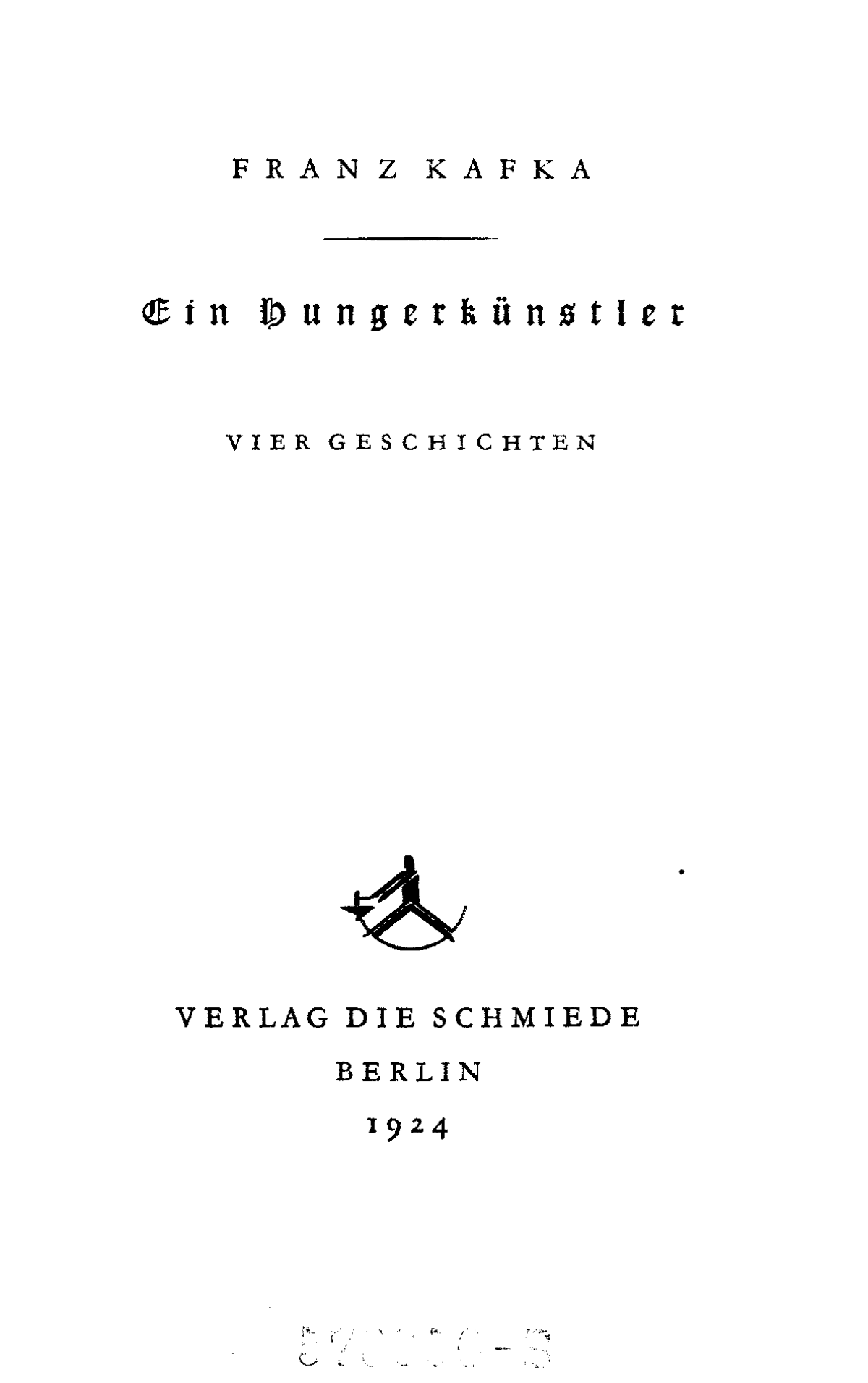
Title page of 1924 edition of Ein Hungerkünstler

"A Hunger Artist" (German: "Ein Hungerkünstler") is a short story by Franz Kafka first published in Die neue Rundschau in 1922. The story was also included in the collection A Hunger Artist (Ein Hungerkünstler), the last book Kafka prepared for publication, which was printed by Verlag Die Schmiede shortly after his death. The protagonist, a hunger artist who experiences the decline in appreciation of his craft, is typically Kafkaesque: an individual marginalized and victimized by society at large. "A Hunger Artist" explores themes such as death, art, isolation, asceticism, spiritual poverty, futility, personal failure and the corruption of human relationships. The title of the story has also been translated as "A Fasting-artist" and "A Starvation Artist".

== Plot ==
"A Hunger Artist" is told retrospectively through third-person narration. The narrator looks back several decades from "today" to a time when the public marveled at the professional hunger artist and then depicts the waning interest in such displays. The story begins with a general description of "the hunger artist" before narrowing in on a single performer, the protagonist.

The hunger artist traveled around performing for curious spectators. He would sit in a cage empty of anything except for a clock and some straw, always attended by rotating teams of watchers selected by the public (usually three butchers) to ensure he was not secretly eating. Despite such precautions, some, including some of the watchers themselves, were convinced the hunger artist cheated. Such suspicions annoyed the hunger artist, as did the forty-day limit imposed on his fasting by his promoter, or "impresario". The impresario insisted that, after forty days, public interest in the hunger artist inevitably declined, but the hunger artist found the time limit irksome and arbitrary, as it prevented him from bettering his own record and fasting indefinitely. At the end of a fast, the hunger artist, amid highly theatrical fanfare, would be carried from his cage and made to eat, both of which he always resented. These performances, followed by intervals of recuperation, were repeated for multiple years.

Despite his fame, the hunger artist felt dissatisfied and misunderstood. If a spectator, observing his apparent melancholy, tried to console him, he would erupt in fury, shaking the bars of his cage. The impresario would punish such outbursts by apologizing to the audience, pointing out that irritability was a consequence of fasting, and then trying to refute the hunger artist's boast that he could fast much longer than he was allowed by showing photographs (which were also for sale) of the hunger artist near death at the end of a previous fast. In this way, the impresario suggested the hunger artist's sadness and poor physique was caused by fasting, when, in the hunger artist's view, he was depressed because of the premature cessation of his fasts. The impresario's "perversion of the truth" further exasperated the hunger artist.

Seemingly overnight, popular tastes changed and public fasting went out of fashion. The hunger artist broke his ties with the impresario and hired himself to a circus, where he hoped to perform truly prodigious feats of fasting. No longer a main attraction, he was given a cage on the outskirts of the circus, near the animal cages. Although the site was readily accessible and crowds thronged past during intermissions in the circus show, few paid any attention to the hunger artist, partly because any spectators who stopped to look at him would create an obstruction in the flow of people on their way to see the animals. The hunger artist initially looked forward to the intermissions, but over time he came to dread them because they only meant there would be noise and disruption and a reminder that his days in the sun were gone. He felt oppressed by the sights, sounds, and smells of the animals, but he didn't dare complain for fear of drawing attention to the fact that he was more of an annoyance than an attraction.

Eventually, the hunger artist came to be completely ignored by the public, so much so that no one, not even the artist himself, counted the days of his fast. One day, an overseer noticed what looked like an empty cage and wondered why it was unused. He and some attendants poked around in the dirty straw and found the hunger artist, near death. Before he died, he asked forgiveness and confessed that he should not be admired, since the reason he fasted was simply that he could not find food to his liking. The hunger artist was buried with the straw from his cage and replaced by a panther. Spectators crowded about the panther's cage because the panther, who was always brought the food he liked, took so much joy in life.

== Background ==
"A Hunger Artist" is arguably partly influenced by Robert Walser's "Answer to an Inquiry" (1907) which depicts a suffering artist. Kafka knew and admired Walser's work (and notably Kafka's first book was described by Robert Musil as "a special case of the Walser type.")

== Themes ==
There is a sharp division among critical interpretations of "A Hunger Artist". Most commentators concur that the story is an allegory, but they disagree as to what is represented. Some critics, pointing to the hunger artist's asceticism, regard him as a saintly or even Christ-like figure. In support of this view, they emphasize the unworldliness of the protagonist, the priest-like quality of the watchers, and the traditional religious significance of the forty-day period. Other critics insist that "A Hunger Artist" is an allegory of the misunderstood artist, whose vision of transcendence and artistic excellence is rejected or ignored by the public. This interpretation is sometimes joined with a reading of the story as autobiographical. According to this view, this story, written near the end of Kafka's life, links the hunger artist with the author as an alienated artist who is dying. Whether the protagonist's starving is seen as spiritual or artistic, the panther is regarded as the hunger artist's antithesis: satisfied and contented, the animal's corporeality stands in marked contrast to the hunger artist's ethereality.

Another interpretive division surrounds the issue of whether "A Hunger Artist" is meant to be read ironically. Some critics consider the story a sympathetic depiction of a misunderstood artist who seeks to rise above the merely animal parts of human nature (represented by the panther) and who is confronted with uncomprehending audiences. Others regard it as Kafka's ironic comment on artistic pretensions. The hunger artist comes to symbolize a joy-deprived man who shows no exuberance, who regards even his own tremendous discipline as inauthentic, and the panther who replaces him obviously is meant to show a sharp contrast between the two. Still, at least one interpretation is that Kafka is expressing the world's indifference to his own artistic scruples through the plight of the hunger artist.

Critic Maud Ellmann argues that it is not by food that we survive, but by the gaze of others and "it is impossible to live by hunger unless we can be seen or represent doing so" (1993:17).

== Adaptations ==
- A comics adaptation of the story, illustrated by Peter Kuper, is included in Give It Up!.
- Introducing Kafka, a graphic novel written by David Zane Mairowitz and illustrated by Robert Crumb, examines Kafka's life and work and includes a retelling of "A Hunger Artist".
- The Hunger Artists Theatre Company staged an adaptation of the story entitled The Pledge Drive: Ruminations On The Hunger Artist, written by Jason Lindner. In the play, The Hunger Artist was the host of a pledge drive in which the guests were other people who were bound by their identities.
- The music video for "Fly from Heaven" from Toad the Wet Sprocket's 1994 album Dulcinea was inspired by the story, though it changes the ending.
- A stop motion animated film The Hunger Artist by Tom Gibbons (2002, US, 16 minutes)
- A Japanese film adaption The Artist of Fasting by Masao Adachi (2016, Japan, 104 minutes)
- Sinking Ship Productions' theatrical adaptation of "A Hunger Artist", created by performer Jonathan Levin, director Joshua William Gelb, and writer Josh Luxenberg, premiered in NYC in 2017 and was nominated for two Drama Desk Awards (Outstanding Solo Performance and Outstanding Puppet Design). The production played at the 2017 Edinburgh Festival Fringe and continues to tour.
