= Crumb family =

American family of cartoonists

The Crumb family of artists is an American family, several of whom are notable cartoonists. The family includes:

- Robert Crumb (b. August 30, 1943) – better known as R. Crumb. Creator of such characters as Fritz the Cat and Mr. Natural.
- Aline Kominsky-Crumb (August 1, 1948 – November 29, 2022) – Robert's wife, known for her underground autobiographical comix.
- Sophie Crumb (b. 1981) – daughter of Robert and Aline, whose work at an early age appeared in her parents' comix magazines.
- Maxon Crumb (b. 1945) – another brother of Charles and Robert's. He has achieved a cult following as a street person and artist.
- Charles Vincent Crumb Jr. (March 13, 1942 – February 1992) – Robert's eldest brother whose childhood obsession with making comics Robert credits as the foundation of his own devotion to art. As he entered adulthood, he began showing signs of mental illness, rarely ventured from the home he shared with his mother, and died by suicide aged 49, reportedly by overdose. He said that he had "homosexual pedophiliac tendencies," specifically relating to Bobby Driscoll, though he never succumbed to his urges and remained determined not to. His art exhibited repetitive and painstaking concentric lines, filling in otherwise normal Crumbesque drawings, reflecting an obsession with filling every last centimeter of white space.

The Crumb family is featured in Terry Zwigoff's 1994 American documentary film Crumb.
