= Crumb (film) =

- Theatrical release poster
- Directed by: Terry Zwigoff
- Produced by: Terry Zwigoff; Lynn O'Donnell
- Starring: Robert Crumb; Aline Kominsky-Crumb; Charles Crumb; Maxon Crumb
- Cinematography: Maryse Alberti
- Edited by: Victor Livingston
- Music by: David Boeddinghaus
- Production company: Superior Pictures
- Distributed by: Sony Pictures Classics
- Release dates: September 10, 1994 (TIFF); April 28, 1995 (United States)
- Running time: 120 minutes
- Country: United States
- Language: English
- Box office: $3.1 million

Crumb is a 1994 American documentary film about the noted underground cartoonist R. Crumb and his family (including his two brothers) and his outlook on life. Directed by Terry Zwigoff and produced by Lynn O'Donnell, it won widespread acclaim. It was released on the film festival circuit in September 1994 before being released theatrically in the United States on April 28, 1995, having been screened at film festivals (and winning the Documentary Prize at Sundance) that year. Jeffery M. Anderson (later critic for the San Francisco Examiner) placed the film on his list of the ten greatest films of all time, labeling it "the greatest documentary ever made." The Criterion Collection released the film on DVD and Blu-ray on August 10, 2010.

== Synopsis ==
Robert Crumb, a pioneer in the underground comix movement of the 1960s, collects 78-rpm blues records from the 1920s and '30s and is moving soon with his wife (fellow comics artist Aline Kominsky-Crumb) and daughter (Sophie) to a house in southern France that he is trading for some of his sketchbooks. He begins a speech at an art school by mentioning the three things he is probably best known for (those being the "Keep on Truckin'" strip from 1968, the Cheap Thrills (1968) album cover, and Fritz the Cat), before spending much of the rest of the film detailing his distaste for modern American consumerist culture and his darkly cynical perspective on life. He is seen sketching his surroundings at cafés and on sidewalks, attending an exhibition of his work, and interacting with friends and family.

Viewers learn about Robert's career through interviews with his contemporaries Don Donahue, Spain Rodriguez, Bill Griffith, and Trina Robbins, as well as critics Robert Hughes and Deirdre English, who also discuss the controversy surrounding many of Robert's depictions of women and African-Americans. Robert's ex-wife Dana and ex-girlfriends Kathy Goodell and Dian Hanson provide additional insights into his personality. Much information about Robert's childhood is derived from scenes of him in conversation with his mother Beatrice, older brother Charles, and younger brother Maxon. Charles, whom Robert acknowledges as his main artistic influence, no longer draws, and takes prescription psychiatric medications to help stabilize his mental state. Maxon, who has a seizure disorder he says is triggered by feelings of sexual arousal, lives an ascetic life in a dilapidated hotel, meditating, begging on the street, and occasionally drawing or painting. All three brothers mention the authoritarian behavior of their father and talk about the comic books Charles made them make when they were children.

Robert is shown drawing with Sophie and Jesse, his son with Dana, with whom Robert has become reacquainted after abandoning his family to move to San Francisco when the boy was young. He invites Jesse to visit him in France, but his main concern regarding the move is about how his records will fare. After the moving men cart off his collection, Robert is distracted from his worries just long enough to take a phone call and reject an offer to make an animated film based on his character Mr. Natural.

An endnote at the close of the film notes that both of Robert's sisters declined to participate in the film. A further endnote reveals that Charles Crumb committed suicide before the film was completed.

== Production ==
Robert Crumb initially did not want to make the film, but eventually agreed. There was a rumor, accidentally created by Roger Ebert, that Terry Zwigoff, who was friends with Crumb, made Crumb cooperate by threatening to shoot himself. Ebert later clarified this in an audio commentary he did with Zwigoff in 2006 and a review he wrote in 2005, where he said: "That never happened, but it may be true that Zwigoff’s life was saved because he did make the film."

During the nine years it took to make the documentary, Zwigoff said he was "averaging an income of about $200 a month and living with back pain so intense that I spent three years with a loaded gun on the pillow next to my bed, trying to get up the nerve to kill myself." He felt the involvement of Maxon and, particularly, Charles was central to the film, which led him to choose "Crumb" as the title.

The film is "presented" by David Lynch, though he had no actual involvement in its making. In the commentary Zwigoff did with Ebert, he says that Lynch did not respond to a request for funds until after the film was already finished, but they agreed to include Lynch's name in the advertising and credits to attract more viewers.

== Soundtrack ==
The soundtrack to Crumb was released on the Rykodisc label, and is a collection early jazz, ragtime and blues songs. The album includes 2 vintage recordings by Geechie Wiley. The other 22 tracks are new recordings split between pianist David Boeddinghaus, and guitarist Craig Ventresco. The artwork was drawn by Robert Crumb and the liner notes were written by Terry Zwigoff.

== Reception ==
Crumb was met with wide acclaim from critics, earning a 95% rating on Rotten Tomatoes based on 43 reviews, with an average score of 8.4/10. The website's critical consensus reads, "Crumb is a frank and surreal chronicle of artistic expression and family trauma, offering an unblinking gaze into the mind and work of cartoonist Robert Crumb that will endear as much as it unsettles." Gene Siskel rated it as the best film of the year. Roger Ebert gave it four stars (out of four), writing: "Crumb is a film that gives new meaning to the notion of art as therapy." Critic Jeffrey M. Anderson gave it four stars (out of four), calling it "one of the bravest and most honest films I've ever seen", and listing its characteristics as those of "a great documentary". In The Washington Post, Desson Howe's review was similarly positive. The San Francisco Chronicle rated the film as "wild applause", with critic Edward Guthmann calling it "one of the most provocative, haunting documentaries of the last decade." He also noted that Robert Crumb and wife Aline had drawn a "scornful" cartoon about the film in The New Yorker.

Despite such strong reviews, Crumb was not nominated for the Academy Award for Best Documentary Feature (the nominating committee reportedly stopped watching the film after only twenty minutes). The Oscar snub of Crumb, following the snubbing of the equally acclaimed Hoop Dreams the previous year, caused a media furor that caused the Academy of Motion Picture Arts and Sciences to revamp its documentary nomination process. Zwigoff stated in an interview that "the Academy Awards thing had much more to do with the fact that at the time, a lot of the documentary membership was made up of distributors of documentary films. The rules have changed since then. But they would just vote for the films they distributed because it was in their financial interest to do so. I came to learn that later. At the time, I just assumed they were disgusted with the film."

In 2008, Entertainment Weekly named Crumb the 14th best film of the last 25 years. In 2012, Slant Magazine ranked the film #74 on its list of the 100 Best Films of the 1990s, calling it "Arguably the greatest of all nonfiction films."

Although Zwigoff only filmed Robert Crumb's brothers with their consent, some have questioned whether they were able to provide that consent in a meaningful way.

=== Awards ===
The film won several major critical accolades awarded for films released in 1995, including:

- Sundance Film Festival – Grand Jury Prize Documentary
- National Board of Review – Best Documentary
- National Society of Film Critics – Best Non-Fiction Film
- New York Film Critics – Best Documentary
- Los Angeles Film Critics – Best Non-Fiction Film
- Boston Film Critics – Best Documentary
- International Documentary Association – Best Feature

== See also ==
- Comic Book Confidential (1988), a documentary about comic books that features R. Crumb
- Fritz the Cat (both the comic strip by R. Crumb and the 1972 Ralph Bakshi film)
- Ghost World (2001), an Oscar-nominated film directed and co-written by Zwigoff based on the acclaimed Daniel Clowes comic
- American Splendor (both the autobiographical comic series by underground comic book writer Harvey Pekar and the Oscar-nominated film from 2003)
- Mental illness in film
- List of cult films

Awards
Preceded by Freedom on My Mind	Sundance Grand Jury Prize: Documentary; 1995	Succeeded by Troublesome Creek: A Midwestern
