= Fritz the Cat =

Fritz the Cat may refer to:

- Fritz the Cat (comics), American comic strip created by Robert Crumb
- Fritz the Cat (film), 1972 American Independent adult animated black comedy film
