= Lynn O'Donnell =

American film producer

Lynn O'Donnell (March 25, 1952 – April 17, 1996) was an independent film producer, whose works included the award-winning Crumb, Living on Tokyo Time, and a number of specials made for America public television, including films on Nobel Laureate Czesław Miłosz and Argentinian tango superstar Carlos Gardel.

O'Donnell collaborated primarily with filmmakers Terry Zwigoff and Steven Okazaki, but worked as well with others, including Irving Saraf and Allie Light.

Films on which she worked won two Academy Awards, and most other major cinema awards and honors, and were featured at film festivals around the world.

O'Donnell died in 1996 of ovarian cancer.

She was married to Lawrence Wilkinson, and they had one daughter, Nora Wilkinson.
