= Kathy Goodell =

American artist

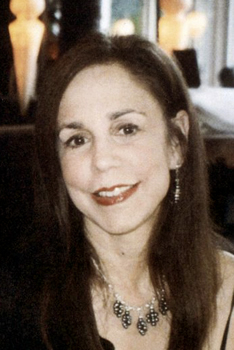
- Born: 1947 (age 78–79); San Francisco, California, United States
- Education: Sacramento State University, San Francisco Art Institute (BFA, MFA)
- Occupations: Visual artist, educator
- Awards: Guggenheim Fellowship (2013)
- Website: kathygoodell.com

Kathy Goodell (born 1947) is an American contemporary artist and educator who works in sculptural objects, installation, drawing, and photography. She is a professor of painting and drawing at the State University of New York at New Paltz.

Goodell received the National Endowment for the Arts Grants in 1979 and 1983, the New York Foundation for the Arts Fellowship in 1993 and 1997 and Guggenheim Fellowship in 2013. She is based in New York City.

== Early life and education ==
Goodell was born in 1947 in San Francisco, California.

She took admission at Sacramento State University, where she studied with Jim Nutt. However, in her third year of college, she transferred to San Francisco Art Institute, where she studied from Gregory Bateson and Jay DeFeo. She holds a B.F.A. degree and M.F.A. degree from the San Francisco Art Institute.

== Career ==
Goodell's first gallery representation was when she was age 21, at the Berkeley Gallery in San Francisco. While Goodell was in San Francisco, she taught at San Francisco Art Institute, San Francisco State University, California College of the Arts, and the University of California, Davis. In 1983, she moved to New York City and later taught at Moore College of Art and Design and the School of Visual Arts before joining State University of New York at New Paltz, where she is a professor in painting and drawing.

In 1994 she appeared in the movie Crumb, a biographical documentary about the artist Robert Crumb, in which she played herself. She launched her work Mesmer Eyes in 2012, which featured artwork consisting of several thousand small ink paintings and optical lenses that were suspended approximately six feet away.

Goodell works in sculptural objects, drawing and photography and often combines these forms into installations. According to her, she has been influenced by Lee Bontecou, Eva Hesse, Jannis Kounellis, Mario Merz, Kurt Schwitters, and Alexander Calder.

== Critical reception ==
Peggy Cyphers of Arts Magazine said of her work, "[her sculptures are] ethereal in their implication of a space that is inhabited by the unseen, matter which looks to have left its skeletal structure for a new form. Baroque and constructivist devices merge in Goodell's works, their efficacious natures obsessively hand-made and exacting in their symmetry and biological patterning."

Reviewing Green Oculus a drawing and lens installation by Goodell, Donald Goddard wrote, "the lenses see the way we see – randomly, inattentively sporadically, imperfectly – focused and unfocused – voraciously. Most particularly they, and we, see the drawings, which represent what is written, the beginnings of life, as an act of the artist." ArtInfo reviewed Mesmer Eyes and wrote that "as the lenses rotated around eye-height, they distorted the view of the painting into an ever-changing array of abstractions. These visions were also captured in photographs taken by the artist of the installation. The work played with the mutability of perception and the literal forms of the biological tools we use to see." In 2014, Hyperallergic wrote about Mesmer that "Goodell’s works are miniscule [sic] strokes and takes on Rothko’s twin but separated chapels in Texas and at the Tate. Like Rothko’s masterworks, Goodell’s little jewels trigger degrees of color perception and color separation that no single drawing is likely to reveal. (And unlike Rothko’s work, Goodell’s pieces aren’t melancholy and anxious!)"

== Awards and honors ==
- National Endowment for the Arts grants (1979, 1983)
- James D. Phelan award (1981)
- Fulbright fellowship (1977)
- The Pollock-Krasner Foundation grant (1991)
- New York Foundation for the Arts fellowship (1993, 1997)
- California Commission for the Arts grant
- John Simon Guggenheim Fellowship, 2013
