= Sophie Crumb =

American-French comics artist

- Crumb in 2004
- Born: Sophie Violet Crumb; September 27, 1981 (age 45) Woodland, California, U.S.
- Area: Cartoonist
- Notable works: Belly Button Comix
- Relatives: Aline Kominsky-Crumb (mother); Robert Crumb (father); Charles Crumb (uncle); Maxon Crumb (uncle)

Sophia Violet "Sophie" Crumb (born September 27, 1981) is an American-French comics artist.

== Personal life ==
Crumb is the daughter of underground comix artists Robert Crumb and Aline Kominsky-Crumb. She was born in Woodland, California, and lived in the nearby farming town of Winters with her parents until she was nine years old. In 1991, she relocated with her family to Sauve, a village in the south of France. Her parents reported that they wanted to remove her from the political conservatives and Christian fundamentalists of the United States. In a 2010 interview, Sophie told The Philadelphia Inquirer that her mother was afraid Sophie would "turn into a Valley girl".

After this relocation, Terry Zwigoff released Crumb (1994), a documentary film about her father and their family. Zwigoff later commissioned Sophie to prepare some original drawings for inclusion in his 2001 comedy drama Ghost World, an adaptation of Daniel Clowes' comics serial of the same name.

After completing her secondary education in France, Crumb studied acrobatics and clowning at a French circus school. While living in Brooklyn early in the -2000s, she sold her comics on the street and apprenticed herself to a tattoo artist. At another stage, she earned a living by teaching English as a foreign language in Paris. She collaborated with her mother and Lizzie Grover Rad on pieces for Grover Rad's first fashion collection.

She lives in the south of France with her husband (a construction worker). They have three children, including their son Eli, who was born in 2009. Her older half-brother, Jesse, son of Robert and his first wife Dana Crumb, died in 2018 from injuries he sustained in a car accident.

== Published work ==
When Crumb was a child, her parents published some of her drawings in their comics anthology, Weirdo; she later contributed to their comic book series Dirty Laundry Comics, originally published from 1977 to 1992. Her artwork as a six-year-old was also featured in Wimmen's Comix #11 (Apr. 1987).

Crumb illustrated a sketchbook for the American film Ghost World (2001). Her drawings were meant to reflect the personality and inner life of Enid Coleslaw (Thora Birch), the film's protagonist.

In 2002, Fantagraphics Books and Oog & Blik published Crumb's first comic book, Belly Button, followed by Belly Button Comix #2 in 2004. She contributed multiple pieces to installments of Mome published between 2005 and 2008.

Her development as a graphic artist is documented in Sophie Crumb: Evolution of a Crazy Artist (W.W. Norton, 2010). Her debut solo show, which featured more than 20 drawings and giclée prints, coincided with the book's publication. The show ran from November 4 to December 30, 2010, at DCKT Contemporary, Dennis Christie and Ken Tyburski's contemporary art gallery in New York City.

== See also ==
- List of artists who created paintings and drawings for use in films
- List of female comics creators
