= Funny Aminals =

1972 underground comic book

- The cover of Funny Aminals, art by Robert Crumb.

Publication information
- Publisher: Apex Novelties
- Format: One-shot
- Genre: Underground Satire
- No. of issues: 1

Creative team
- Written by: Robert Crumb; Justin Green; Art Spiegelman; Shary Flenniken; Jay Lynch; Michael McMillan; Bill Griffith
- Artist(s): Robert Crumb; Justin Green; Art Spiegelman; Shary Flenniken; Jay Lynch; Michael McMillan; Bill Griffith

Funny Aminals is a 1972 single-issue anthology underground comic book created by Robert Crumb and a collection of other artists. The work is notable for containing the first published version of Art Spiegelman's Maus, though the version that ran in Funny Aminals was aesthetically and thematically different from the series Spiegelman would publish in Raw Magazine and as a standalone book.

== Publication history ==
Apex Novelties published the book in July 1972, and it had one print run of an estimated 20,000 to 30,000 copies. The book was initially formulated by Terry Zwigoff after a scarring visit to a slaughterhouse as an anti-animal cruelty book, but the submitted stories departed from that narrative line. Zwigoff later relinquished all editorial control over the comic.

== Contents ==
Stories in Funny Aminals
Story	Artist	Writer
"Forward"	Justin Green	Justin Green
"What a World!"	Robert Crumb	Robert Crumb
"Maus"	Art Spiegelman	Art Spiegelman
"The Working Girl"	Shary Flenniken	Shary Flenniken
"Double Trouble"	Jay Lynch/Robert Crumb	Jay Lynch/Robert Crumb
"Captain Flashlight Fights the Animal Cracker Zombies"	Michael McMillan	Michael McMillan
"The Toadette King"	Bill Griffith	Bill Griffith
"The Bitter Earth"	Justin Green	Justin Green
"Stinky the Pig"	Jay Lynch	Jay Lynch
"What a World! Part Two"	Robert Crumb	Robert Crumb
"Feelin' Glum?"	Jay Lynch	Jay Lynch

== Reception ==
Underground comix database Comixjoint gave Funny Aminals a 9/10 ranking, calling the writing "solid" and the illustrations "exceptional", adding a four-star historical bonus for Maus. Summarizing his review, writer Steven Fox wrote "Funny Aminals is an uneven book, but its review score (especially the writing score) is boosted by "Maus", which also gets credit for the book's historical bonus. And if Crumb hadn't contributed his crafty penmanship and bawdy humor, even "Maus" wouldn't have been enough to earn Funny Aminals the total score of "9" I begrudgingly bestowed upon it".
