= Maxon Crumb =

American artist

- Born: March 28, 1945 (age 81); Albert Lea, Minnesota, US
- Known for: Painting, drawing, writing
- Notable work: Crumb Family Comics, Maxon's Poe, HardCore Mother

Maxon Joseph Crumb (born March 28, 1945) is an American artist and the younger brother of underground cartoonist Robert Crumb and Charles Crumb, and the uncle of Sophie Crumb.

== Biography ==
Crumb was born in Albert Lea, Minnesota on March 28, 1945, the third son of Charles and Beatrice Crumb. His early work can be found in publications such as Weirdo, Liquidator, Maxon's Poe (1997), and Crumb Family Comics (Last Gasp, 1998).

His first published novel, HardCore Mother (2000), was a study of incest and sadism. After its publication in 2001, his work found a wider audience.

Crumb was featured in the documentary Crumb, about his brother, Robert.

== Art practice ==
Crumb initially started painting as a way to deal with his own personal demons. He has subsequently managed to earn money from his art.

His paintings and ink drawings can take weeks or months to complete. During this time, Maxon says that he will enter into an intense creative state where the work becomes paramount, to the detriment of normal everyday concerns, including eating.

Crumb's drawings are available online as well as fine art limited-edition prints.

== Personal life ==
External image
- Bank of America, 1969, San Francisco
- Maxon Crumb sits begging

In addition to his brothers Charles and Robert, Maxon also had two sisters, Carol DeGennaro (1941–2020) and Sandra Colorado (1946–1998).

Crumb practices celibacy and has done so for many years because, as he has explained in interviews, for him, sex triggers epileptic seizures. In the 1994 documentary Crumb, he admitted to a history of sexually assaulting women.

I'd see Maxon Crumb sitting on Market Street, cross-legged with his bowl in front of him.

— author Ron Deutsch
