= Sean Rad =

American entrepreneur (born 1986)

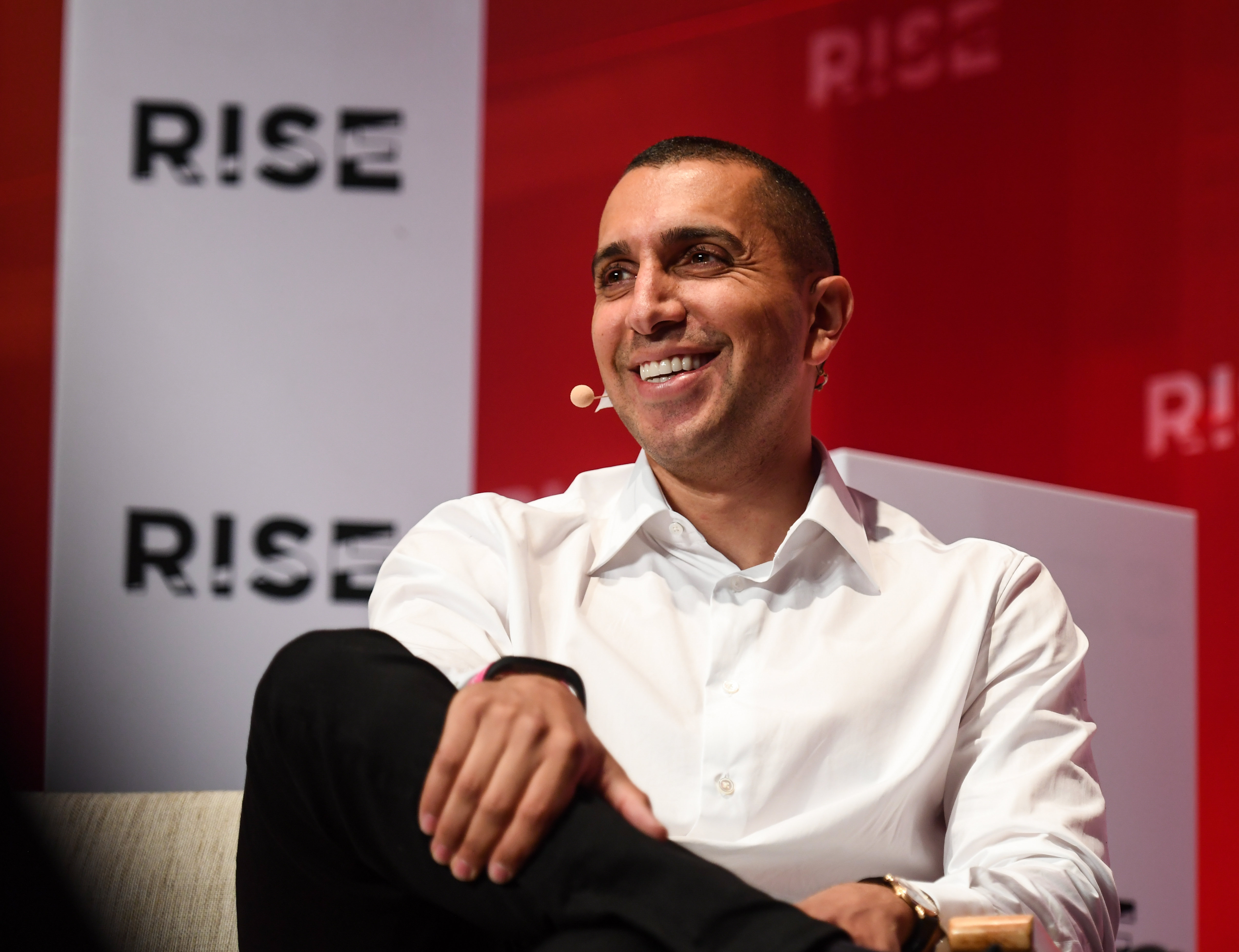
- Rad in 2018
- Born: May 22, 1986 (age 40); Los Angeles, California, U.S.
- Education: University of Southern California (dropped out)
- Known for: Founder of Tinder
- Board member of: Good Today, AllVoices
- Spouse: Lizzie Grover Rad (m. 2018)

Sean Rad (born May 22, 1986) is an American entrepreneur and Founder of Tinder. Rad launched Tinder in 2012 and, by 2015, Tinder was the top grossing app in 99 countries. By 2017, Tinder became the highest grossing app in Apple's App Store.

Rad holds 15 patents for his work, including the patent for Tinder's "double opt-in" system, in which users must match before they can exchange messages.

In 2017, Rad left Tinder over a valuation dispute with Tinder's parent company, IAC/Match Group. In 2018, Rad and Tinder's founding team filed a $2 billion lawsuit against IAC, which was later settled in 2022 for $441 million.

== Early life and career ==
Rad was born in Los Angeles, California to a Persian Jewish family. His parents emigrated from Iran in the 1970s. He has a large family with 12 uncles and aunts and 42 first cousins.

Rad attended private school. During high school, he founded a band and interned for an entertainment manager. He later decided that being an artist wasn't for him.

In 2004, Rad enrolled at the University of Southern California (USC). That same year, he started his first company, Orgoo, a unified messaging and video communications platform. Rad leveraged a network of USC computer science students to help him build the Orgoo technology. In 2006, Rad left USC to pursue his business ventures.

== Career ==
=== Ad.ly ===
In 2009, he founded Ad.ly, a celebrity endorsement platform that connected celebrities with brands. In 2010, the company raised $5 million in VC funding from Greycroft Partners, Matt Coffin, and GRP Partners' Mark Suster. Suster said of the investment, "I didn't invest in Orgoo but by the time he launched Ad.ly I knew [Rad's] capabilities and knew I wanted to work with him."

=== Tinder ===
In January 2012, Rad joined the startup incubator Hatch Labs to build Cardify, a next-generation, app based, customer loyalty rewards program. However, within weeks of his joining, the incubator held an internal 48-hour hackathon, where Rad presented the idea for a double opt-in dating app called Matchbox. MatchBox (which would later be named Tinder) was awarded first prize in the hackathon.

In September 2012, Rad and his team officially launched Tinder. Unlike previous dating apps, Tinder was designed for a mobile interface and utilized photo-focused profiles that were easily navigated with an intuitive swiping motion. Within two months of launch, the app had facilitated over one million matches. Tinder was named the "Best New Startup of 2013" by TechCrunch. By 2014, the app was processing more than one billion swipes per day with the average user spending 90 minutes on the app. By 2015, Tinder became the highest grossing app in Apple's App Store.

Rad served as Tinder's CEO from 2012 until March 2015 and then again from August 2015 until December 2016. From March to August 2015, Rad was replaced as CEO by former eBay executive, Christopher Payne. During this time, Rad served as president and head of product and marketing. Rad returned as CEO in August 2015 and remained in the role until December 2016, when he was replaced by Match Group's CEO Greg Blatt. Rad remained Tinder's chairman of the board until late 2017. In 2017, Rad left Tinder over an RSU (restricted stock unit) valuation dispute and in 2018 he filed a $2 billion lawsuit against Tinder's parent company, IAC.

After Match Group and Tinder merged in July 2017, Match Group's market capitalization has grown from $8.34 billion to $44.59 billion as of October 14, 2021. Tinder became the highest grossing app in Apple's App Store in 2017. In August 2021, Morgan Stanley valued Tinder's worth at $42 billion.

=== AllVoices ===
In 2018, Rad and Claire Schmidt co-founded AllVoices. AllVoices is an app that allows employees to anonymously report harassment, ethics, compliance, and other workplace issues directly to a company's board. AllVoices was developed by Rad and former vice president of technology and innovation at 20th Century Fox Claire Schmidt in response to rampant complaints of sexual harassment in the technology and entertainment industries. After submitting a report, users are notified when the company receives the information and when or if the company acts upon that report.

== Philanthropy ==
Rad is a Founding Board Member of Good Today, a non-profit organization that promotes daily support of various charitable organizations. The app allows users to make daily donations of as little as 25 cents and offers company sponsorships for employees who donate through the app.

== Awards and recognition ==
Rad was included on the Forbes 30 Under 30 list in 2014. Rad was also recognized by Fast Company as one of the Most Creative People in the business community. In May 2016, Rad received an honoree diploma from University of Southern California and delivered the 2016 USC Marshall School of Business undergraduate commencement speech. Also in 2016, Rad accepted a Webby Award for Tinder. In 2017, Rad was honored as a "30 Under 30" by the Jewish Journal. In 2020, Rad was again recognized by Forbes as one of the Top 10 Under 30 Founders of the decade.

== Controversies ==
In June 2014, Whitney Wolfe Herd filed a lawsuit against Tinder and IAC. She accused former boyfriend and co-founder Justin Mateen of sexual harassment and Rad as CEO of failing to respond to her complaints. Rad said, "Justin is nuts" when Wolfe complained to him, ignoring her and calling her emotional. Mateen was suspended from the company. The lawsuit was settled out of court without admission of guilt from either party involved.

In 2015, Rad "appeared to make a veiled threat" to Vanity Fair reporter Nancy Jo Sales after an article she published on "hook up culture". Sales published an open letter in response to Rad. That same year, Match Group filed an 8K registration statement that Rad did not speak on behalf of the company after he disclosed inaccurate figures during an interview prior to an IPO.

=== Rad v. IAC ===
In 2018, Rad filed a 55-page complaint against Barry Diller's media conglomerate, IAC, alleging that IAC had "scammed Rad personally out of more than $1 billion". At the time of the filing, IAC owned Tinder; the complaint featured 2,500 documents of evidence. Rad and other former executives and employees of Tinder then sued Match Group and IAC for $2 billion, arguing the company manipulated the valuation of Tinder and denied them billions of dollars. IAC and Match Group filed a motion to dismiss the case, but the appeals court upheld the trial court's decision to deny this request and a trial date was scheduled.

In 2019, in a counter $250 million lawsuit by Match Group and IAC, Match said that Rad recorded "sensitive business conversations" between his superiors and colleagues without consent and copied proprietary company files to his personal devices while working at Tinder. Rad argued that his contract gave him the right to take those actions and he asked the New York Supreme Court to dismiss the lawsuit against him.

In December 2021, following nearly 3 weeks in a Manhattan courtroom, Match Group announced it would pay a settlement of $441 million to Rad and other Tinder founders and executives. The settlement was announced one day before Match and parent company IAC along with Tinder founders were set to give closing statements and send the case to jury deliberation. A media statement from both parties read: "The parties are pleased to announce that they have settled the valuation lawsuit presently on trial in New York Supreme Court and the related valuation arbitration." Match commented that it intends to pay the settlement using cash on hand in a filing with the Securities and Exchange Commission.

== Personal life ==
In 2018, Rad married his longtime partner, Lizzie Grover Rad, in a ceremony at their Montecito home. The couple currently resides in Los Angeles, California with their Golden Retriever, Minnie. Rad and Grover-Rad are avid art collectors, and were included in Cultured Young Collectors 2020, in which their art collection was recognized as "a place for disruptors".

Rad serves on the board of the Milken Community High School. In December 2021, Rad and his wife were featured in Architectural Digest, in which they provided a tour of their professionally decorated Los Angeles home.

He was played by Ben Schnetzer in the 2025 movie Swiped.
