= Best Buy Comics =

1979 comic book by Robert Crumb and Aline Kominsky

- Front cover art for Best Buy Comics by Robert Crumb.

Publication information
- Publisher: Apex Novelties
- Format: standard comic book
- Publication date: Feb. 1979
- No. of issues: 1

Creative team
- Created by: Robert Crumb and Aline Kominsky
- Artist(s): Robert Crumb, Aline Kominsky

Best Buy Comics is a one-shot comic book by Robert Crumb and Aline Kominsky (later Crumb), published by Apex Novelties in 1979. All the stories in the book except one were first published by CoEvolution Quarterly.

Best Buy Comics tackles more "serious" subjects than typical Crumb or others underground comix. Subjects include the aerospace program, the eventual fate of humanity, attitudes toward life, death, nuclear war, and historical fiction set at the dawn of the Jazz Age.

Best Buy Comics was the last title published by Apex Novelties. It was republished in 1988 by Last Gasp.

== Contents ==
- An unnamed page about melting in front of a television
- "R. Crumb's Modern Dance Workshop"
- Space Day Symposium "
- "The Goose and the Gander were Talking one Night"
- "The Nerds"
- "Kansas City Frank Melrose in Pass the Jug"
- "These Kids Today"
- "Little Joe in Morbid Preoccupations"
- "R. Crumb's Modern Dance Workshop in Purely Esthetic Experience"
- "Those Little Bears We Love so Much"
- "The Final Solution, Read it and Weep"
- "Mister Nostalgia"
- "It's a Hup Ho World"
- "Professor Wanowsky on Welfare"
- "Kiwi"
- "Hapy Hour Comics"
- "Maybe We'll End Like This"
- "Aline and Bob Go To the Whole Earth Jamboree" — original story by Crumb and Komisky not previously published
