= Lizzie Grover Rad =

American businesswoman and fashion designer

- Born: 1990 (age 35–36); Richmond, Virginia
- Occupations: Fashion designer; businesswoman
- Spouse: Sean Rad

Lizzie Grover Rad (born 1990) is an American fashion designer and business woman. She is the founder of her own brand, Grover Rad, and previously co-founded virtual interior design company ZOOM Interior. She is known for her politically active fashion designs.

== Biography ==
She was born in 1990 and grew up in Richmond, Virginia. She attended the University of Colorado Boulder before transferring to the George Washington University, where she earned her Bachelor of Fine Arts. She then moved to Philadelphia after college and co-founded a virtual interior design company, ZOOM Interior, together with GWU classmates. The company went on Shark Tank in 2015. She served as chief creative officer. She left the company during COVID.

She launched her own fashion brand, Grover Rad, in 2022. Her first collection focused on supporting abortion rights in the United States, with pieces assisted by comic artists Aline Kominsky-Crumb and Sophie Crumb recounting their own abortions. She donated 25% of proceeds to the Yellow Hammer Fund, an abortion rights group in the Southern United States.

Her second collection focused on the billionaire space race. Her third collection, titled Nip Tuck – the Perfection of Beauty, was a critique of the plastic surgery industry and its trendification. Her fourth collection, Corporate Corruption: Deal with the Devil, was a critique of corporate corruption. Her fifth collection focused on drug laws in the United States, which she analyzed: during this time, she revealed she was in favor of psychedelic therapy.

She has been described as "uncompromising(ly) wearing her ideals on her sleeve." This has resulted in controversy and backlash.

Her work is in the collection of the Metropolitan Museum of Art. She was named an interim member of the Council of Fashion Designers of America in April 2023, where she would hold a three-year term.

She is married to Sean Rad, the co-founder of Tinder, and resides in Los Angeles with him. She has ADHD. She is also an art collector.
