= Introducing Kafka =

1993 biography by David Zane Mairowitz

- Book cover
- Author: David Zane Mairowitz
- Illustrator: Robert Crumb
- Language: English
- Series: Introducing...
- Genre: Biography
- Publisher: Totem Books
- Publication date: 1993
- Publication place: United States
- ISBN: 1-84046-122-5

Introducing Kafka, also known as R. Crumb's Kafka, is an illustrated biography of Franz Kafka by David Zane Mairowitz and Robert Crumb. The book includes comic adaptations of some of Kafka's most famous works including The Metamorphosis, A Hunger Artist, In the Penal Colony, and The Judgment, as well as brief sketches of his three novels The Trial, The Castle, and Amerika. The book also details Kafka's biography in a format that is part illustrated essay, part sequential comic panels.

== Publication history ==
The book was released as part of the "Introducing..." series by Totem Books; the popularity of Crumb's renditions of Kafka's works led to additional printings under the titles R. Crumb's Kafka and Kafka for Beginners, and its most recent edition by Fantagraphics Books (2007) is titled simply Kafka.

== Content ==
The book focuses on the biographical details of Kafka's life, interspersed with illustrated vignettes from his writing. The author relates Kafka's personality and various incidents in his life to the composition of his stories. For example, Kafka's complicated relationship with his family is linked to stories where the main character is an animal – notably The Metamorphosis, whose protagonist, Gregor Samsa, awakens to find himself transformed into a giant bug, and becomes a burden on his family.

== Editions ==
Cover of R.Crumb's Kafka

- Mairowitz, David Zane (writer) and Robert Crumb (illustrator). Introducing Kafka. New York: Totem Books, 1993. ISBN 1-84046-122-5
- Mairowitz, David Zane (writer) and Robert Crumb (illustrator). Kafka for Beginners. Cheltenham, England: Icon Publishing Ltd, 1993.
- Mairowitz, David Zane (writer) and Robert Crumb (illustrator). R. Crumb's Kafka. iBooks Graphic Novels, 2005. ISBN 1-59687-812-6
- Mairowitz, David Zane (writer) and Robert Crumb (illustrator). Kafka. Fantagraphics Books, 2007. ISBN 978-1-56097-806-0
