= David Zane Mairowitz =

American writer

- Born: 1943 (age 82–83); New York City, United States
- Education: Hunter College; University of California, Berkeley
- Occupation: Writer
- Spouse: Malgorzata Zerwe
- Writing career
- Notable works: International Times; Introducing Kafka

David Zane Mairowitz (born 1943 in New York City, United States), is a writer. He has written radio dramas, graphic novels, and nonfiction books & essays.

Mairowitz studied English literature and philosophy at Hunter College, New York; and drama at the University of California, Berkeley.

In 1966 he immigrated to England, where he worked as a freelance writer. He was one of the founding editors of International Times.

Since 1982 he has resided in southern France.

== Works ==
- The Law Circus (1969), a play.
- BAMN: Outlaw Manifestos and Ephemera 1965–70 (1971), editor with Peter Stansill.
- Flash Gordon and the Angels (1971), a play.
- The Radical Soap Opera: Roots of Failure in the American Left (1974).
- The Stalin Sonata (1989), a radio drama.
- Dictator Gal (broadcast in 1992), a radio drama starring Josette Simon.
- Kafka for Beginners, also known as Introducing Kafka (1993), illustrated by Robert Crumb.
- Introducing Camus, illustrated by Alain Korkos.
- Graphic novel version of Franz Kafka's The Castle, illustrated by Czech artist and musician Jaromír 99 (Jaromír Švejdík).
- Love Tunnels: Getting Married in Las Vegas, a radio documentary broadcast in February 2021 on the CBC Radio programme Ideas.
