= Don Donahue =

Publisher associated with the underground comix movement

- Born: May 18, 1942
- Died: October 27, 2010 (aged 68); Berkeley, California, U.S.
- Occupation(s): Publisher, editor, retailer
- Known for: Contributions to the underground comix movement
- Notable work: Apex Novelties; The Apex Treasury of Underground Comics
- Partner: Dori Seda

Apex Novelties
- The Apex Novelties logo
- Founded: 1968
- Founder: Don Donahue
- Defunct: early 1990s
- Country of origin: United States
- Headquarters location: San Francisco, California
- Key people: Susan Goodrick
- Publication types: Comics, pamphlets, posters
- Nonfiction topics: Politics, social commentary
- Fiction genres: Underground comix

Donald Richard Donahue (May 18, 1942 – October 27, 2010) was a comic book publisher, operating under the name Apex Novelties, one of the instigators of the underground comix movement in the 1960s.

Donahue published numerous influential comics from that movement, including the first run of Zap Comix and a number of other highly regarded comics by Robert Crumb, such as Your Hytone Comics (1971) and Black and White Comics (1973).

Apex Novelties published the bulk of its comix from 1968 to 1974. Besides Crumb, other creators associated with Apex Novelties include S. Clay Wilson, Jay Lynch, Victor Moscoso, Art Spiegelman, Rory Hayes, Spain Rodriguez, Rick Griffin, Michael McMillan, Kim Deitch, Shary Flenniken, Justin Green, and Gilbert Shelton.

Donahue co-edited The Apex Treasury of Underground Comics, one of the first book collections to highlight the underground comix era.

== Career ==
In San Francisco in early 1968, Donahue traded his hi-fi tape player to poet Charles Plymell to publish the first issue of Robert Crumb's Zap Comix on Plymell's printing press. Donahue later purchased the equipment and founded Apex Novelties.

The publisher's first headquarters was in the third-floor ballroom of the former Mowry's Opera House, located at 633 Laguna Street in Hayes Valley (fellow underground publisher Rip Off Press also shared that space). While at that location, Donahue published some of the most notable — and notorious — comix of the underground era, including Zap issues #1-4, Snatch Comics issues #1–3, Cunt Comics, Jiz, King Bee, and The Life and Loves of Cleopatra.

After a fire almost destroyed the building in late 1969, Apex Novelties moved to a storefront at 1417 Valencia Street in the Mission District.

In 1970, Susan Goodrick became Donahue's partner in Apex Novelties, staying with the company until 1978. Also in 1970, Donahue helped Gary Arlington recruit artists for, and helped edit the first issue of, Arlington's anthology title San Francisco Comic Book.

Donahue and Goodrick co-edited The Apex Treasury of Underground Comics, published in 1974 by Links Books/Quick Fox. The 192-page anthology collected previously published stories and strips (not just from Apex Novelty titles) by Robert Crumb, Kim Deitch, Shary Flenniken, Justin Green, Bill Griffith, Bobby London, Jay Lynch, Willy Murphy, Spain Rodriguez, Gilbert Shelton, and Art Spiegelman. (The book was re-issued in 1981 by Quick Fox as a "flip book" with The Best of Bijou Funnies, which had originally been published in 1975.)

In the mid-1970s, Apex Novelties was known for publishing material by radicals, including the Symbionese Liberation Army (known for kidnapping Patty Hearst). Donahue's final published comix title was in early 1979 with the R. Crumb comic Best Buy Comics. (By this time, Apex Novelties was located at 353 Frederick Street in San Francisco's Haight-Ashbury.)

In the early 1980s, Donahue moved operations to Berkeley's Dakin Warehouse, where he lived and worked with other like-minded people. From that location, he became one of the country's top dealers of underground comix and other ephemera. According to historian Patrick Rosenkranz, Donahue's "last publishing venture was a series of silk-screened posters he made in the early 1990s." Donahue remained at the Dakin Warehouse until 2002.

== Personal life and death ==
The partner of cartoonist Dori Seda, Donahue inherited the rights to her work following her death in 1988 at the age of 37, and edited Dori Stories, a compilation of her comics, which was published by Last Gasp in 1999.

Donahue died of cancer on October 27, 2010, in Berkeley after many years of alcoholism.

== Comix titles published ==
=== R. Crumb works ===
- Best Buy Comics (Feb. 1979) – Consists primarily of Crumb material originally published in CoEvolution Quarterly
- Black and White Comics (June 1973)
- Mr. Natural (2 issues, 1970–1971) – co-published with San Francisco Comic Book Company; later continued by Kitchen Sink Press
- Snatch Comics (3 issues, late 1968–Aug. 1969) – Principally by R. Crumb (using various pseudonyms) and S. Clay Wilson
- Your Hytone Comics (Feb. 1971)
- Zap Comix (4 issues, Feb.–Fall 1968) — R. Crumb, Wilson, Moscoso, Spain, Griffin, Shelton, and Robert Williams; later continued by the Print Mint

=== Other creators ===
- Ace Hole, Midget Detective (1974) — large-format black-and-white comic by Art Spiegelman
- Cunt Comics (1969) — Rory Hayes, with minor contributions from Donahue, Lynch, and Deitch
- Four Sketchbooks and a Table of Useful Information (1973) — digest-sized collection of sketchbooks by Art Spiegelman, Bill Griffith, Spain Rodriguez, and Justin Green
- Funny Aminals (1972) — anti-animal vivisection anthology edited by Terry Zwigoff featuring Crumb, Lynch, Green, Flenniken, Michael McMillan, Bill Griffith, and Spiegelman (whose three-page strip, "Maus", was the inspiration for Maus)
- Jiz (1969) — anthology featuring R. Crumb, Lynch, Spain, Hayes, S. Clay Wilson, and Victor Moscoso
- King Bee (1969) — tabloid anthology mostly by S. Clay Wilson with contributions from several other Zap Comix crew members — Crumb, Moscoso, and Rick Griffin — as well as Jeremy Marks and Peter Max
- Left-Field Funnies (1972) — anthology featuring cartoonists associated with the Air Pirates collective, including Bobby London, Gary King, and Willy Murphy
- The Life and Loves of Cleopatra (Nov. 1969) — reprint of a self-published Harry Driggs comic originally released in 1967
- Terminal Comics (1971) — Michael McMillan
