= Aline Kominsky-Crumb =

American cartoonist (1948–2022)

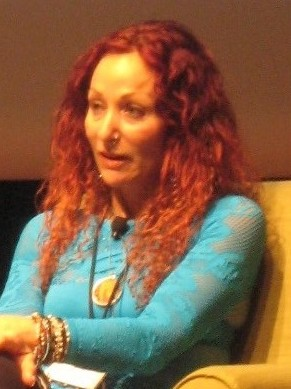
- Kominsky-Crumb in 2012
- Born: Aline Goldsmith; August 1, 1948 Long Beach, New York, U.S.
- Died: November 29, 2022 (aged 74) Sauve, Gard, France
- Areas: Cartoonist, Writer, Artist
- Notable works: Twisted Sisters; Dirty Laundry Comics
- Collaborators: Robert Crumb
- Spouses: Carl Kominsky (m. 1968, divorced) Robert Crumb (m. 1978)
- Children: Sophie Crumb

Aline Kominsky-Crumb (née Goldsmith; August 1, 1948 – November 29, 2022) was an American underground comics artist. Kominsky-Crumb's work, which is almost exclusively autobiographical, is known for its unvarnished, confessional nature. In 2016, ComicsAlliance listed Kominsky-Crumb as one of twelve women cartoonists deserving of lifetime achievement recognition. She was married to cartoonist Robert Crumb, with whom she frequently collaborated. Their daughter, Sophie Crumb, is also a cartoonist.

== Biography ==
=== Early life and education ===
Aline Goldsmith was born to a Jewish family in the Five Towns area of Long Island, New York. Her father was a largely unsuccessful businessman and organized crime associate. As a teenager, she turned to drugs and the counterculture, and was a hanger-on to New York countercultural musicians such as The Fugs. Relocating to East Village during her college years, she began studying art at The Cooper Union.

In 1968, Aline married Carl Kominsky, with whom she relocated to Tucson, Arizona. Their marriage did not last long; nonetheless, she retained the surname Kominsky after their split. During this time, she attended the University of Arizona, graduating with a BFA in 1971.

=== Career ===
Kominsky-Crumb was introduced to underground cartoonists Spain Rodriguez and Kim Deitch by former Fugs drummer Ken Weaver, who was living in Tucson at the same time. Rodriguez and Deitch introduced her to underground comics, inspiring her to begin making underground comics herself and to relocate to San Francisco.

In 1972, soon after arriving in San Francisco, Aline was introduced to Robert Crumb by mutual friends, who had noted an uncanny resemblance between her and the coincidentally-named Crumb character Honeybunch Kaminski (who had been created in 1970). Their relationship soon became serious, and they began living together.

Kominsky-Crumb also fell in with the Wimmen's Comix collective, and contributed to the first few issues of that series. After she and Diane Noomin fell out with Trina Robbins and other members of the collective, they started their own title, Twisted Sisters. Kominsky-Crumb later claimed that a large part of her break with the Wimmen's Comix group was over feminist issues and particularly over her relationship with Robert Crumb, whom Robbins particularly disliked.

Kominsky-Crumb married Crumb in 1978. Their daughter Sophie was born in 1981. Starting in the late 1970s, Aline and Robert produced a series of collaborative comics called Dirty Laundry (also known as Aline & Bob's Dirty Laundry), a comic about the Crumb family life. They both drew their own characters for the comic. Around this time, Kominsky-Crumb began calling her comics avatar "The Bunch," a reference to the similarly named Crumb character. Later installments of Dirty Laundry feature contributions by Sophie, who also began producing comics in her teens.

From 1986 to 1993, Kominsky-Crumb was editor of Weirdo, a leading alternative comics anthology of the time, taking over the editorship from Peter Bagge, who had previously taken over from original editor Robert Crumb. During her editorship the paper was known as "Twisted Sisters", reviving that title; Noomin was a frequent Weirdo contributor during this period, which also featured Kominsky-Crumb's own comics.

From 1991, Robert and Aline lived as expatriates in a small French village in the Languedoc-Roussillon region. Aline had long been an avowed Francophile, while Robert had become especially disgusted with American culture, and they believed it would be a better environment for their daughter.

Kominsky-Crumb was featured in a number of scenes in Crumb, the 1994 documentary about the Crumb family.

Kominsky-Crumb and her husband had an open marriage, and Kominsky-Crumb's "second husband", French printmaker Christian Coudurès, lived with the family (as did his daughter, Agathe McCamy, who assisted Kominsky-Crumb in coloring her comics).

In addition to her comics work, Kominsky-Crumb was a painter. After moving to France, she focused more on painting and less on producing comics. In February 2007 she released a memoir entitled Need More Love: A Graphic Memoir, a collection of her comics and paintings, along with photographs and autobiographical writings.

In 2018, Kominsky-Crumb's Love That Bunch, which was originally published in 1990, was expanded by Drawn & Quarterly with new comics and an introduction written by Hillary Chute.

She collaborated with her daughter and fashion designer Lizzie Grover Rad on a work for Rad's first collection.

=== Death ===
Kominsky-Crumb died from pancreatic cancer at her home in France on November 29, 2022, at the age of 74.

== In popular culture ==
In the 2015 movie The Diary of a Teenage Girl, set in San Francisco during the mid-1970's, the heroine, an aspiring cartoonist, imagines herself talking with Kominsky. She apparently writes a letter to Kominsky, and receives a response, encouraging her to continue drawing.

== Works ==
=== Comics contributed to ===
- Wimmen's Comix #1, 2, #4 (1972–1974)
- El Perfecto (1973) – contributor & editor
- Manhunt (1973–1974)
- Dirty Laundry Comics #1, 2 (1974–1977)
- Arcade (1975–1976)
- Twisted Sisters (Last Gasp, 1976) – contributor & editor
- Lemme Outta Here (The Print Mint, 1978)
- Best Buy Comics (Apex Novelties / Last Gasp, 1979–88)
- Weirdo (Last Gasp, 1986–1993) – contributor & editor
- Real Stuff #6 (Fantagraphics, 1992)
- Twisted Sisters #4 (Kitchen Sink Press, 1994)
- Self-Loathing Comics #1 & 2 (Fantagraphics, 1995–97)

==== Compilations ====
- Twisted Sisters: A Collection of Bad Girl Art. Penguin. 1991. ISBN 0140153772.)
- The Complete Dirty Laundry Comics. Last Gasp. 1993. ISBN 0867193794.)
- Twisted Sisters 2: Drawing the Line. Kitchen Sink Press. 1994. ISBN 0878163441.)
- Drawn Together: The Collected Works of R. and A. Crumb. Norton. 2012. ISBN 978-0871404299.)

=== Solo work ===
- — (1979–81). The Bunch's Power Pak Comics. Kitchen Sink Press.
- — (1990). Love That Bunch. Fantagraphics. ISBN 1560970170.); re-issued by Drawn & Quarterly in 2018 (ISBN 978-1-77046-305-9)
- — (2007). Need More Love: A Graphic Memoir. MQ Publications. ISBN 978-1846011337.

== Bibliography ==
- Chute, Hillary L. (2010). Graphic Women: Life Narrative and Contemporary Comics. New York: Columbia University Press. ISBN 978-0-231-15062-0. OCLC 496610090.
