= Terry Zwigoff =

American filmmaker (born 1949)

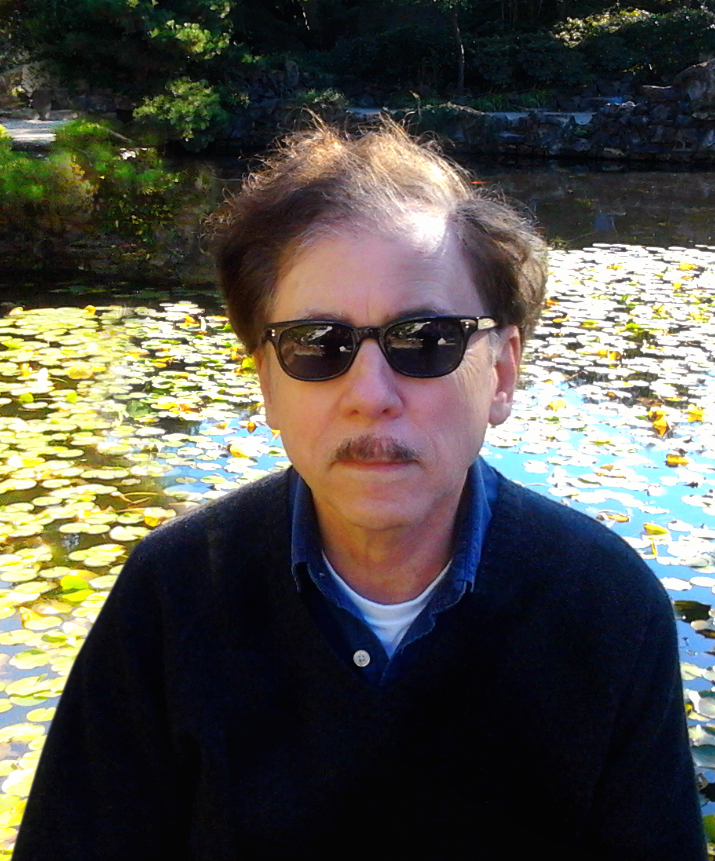
- Zwigoff in 2012
- Born: May 18, 1949 (age 77); Appleton, Wisconsin, U.S.
- Education: University of Wisconsin–Madison
- Occupations: Director; producer
- Years active: 1979–present
- Spouse: Melissa Axelrod

Terry Zwigoff (born May 18, 1949) is an American film director whose work often deals with misfits, antiheroes, and themes of alienation. He first garnered attention for his work in documentary filmmaking with Louie Bluie (1985) and Crumb (1995). After Crumb, Zwigoff moved on to write and direct fiction feature films, including the Academy Award-nominated Ghost World (2001) and Bad Santa (2003).

== Life and career ==
=== Early life and education ===
Zwigoff was born in Appleton, Wisconsin, to a Jewish family of dairy farmers. He was raised in Chicago.

=== Underground comix scene ===
Zwigoff moved to San Francisco in the 1970s and met cartoonist Robert Crumb, who shared his interest in pre-war American roots music. Zwigoff, who plays cello and mandolin (as well as the saw, and the Stroh violin), joined Crumb's string band R. Crumb & His Cheap Suit Serenaders, with whom he recorded several records.

Zwigoff's friendship with Crumb led to his involvement in the underground comix scene. He initially edited the one-shot Funny Aminals #1 (Apex Novelties, 1972), the groundbreaking comic in which Art Spiegelman first introduced the characters and themes that would become Maus. In 1972–1973, Zwigoff operated Golden Gate, a small retailer and underground comix publisher (located at 429 Brazil Street in San Francisco). Golden Gate Publishing released three comics during this period, all of which heavily featured Crumb's work:

- The People's Comics (Sept. 1972) – all Crumb; features the story in which Fritz the Cat is killed
- Turned On Cuties (1972) – 28 pages of "pin-up" illustrations by Jay Lynch and a host of other San Francisco-based underground comix creators
- Artistic Comics (Mar. 1973) – 68 pp. of reproductions from Crumb's sketchbooks

Zwigoff later sold Golden Gate's publishing rights to Kitchen Sink Press.

From 1981 to 1984, Zwigoff helmed the letter column of Weirdo, a comics anthology edited by Crumb. "Weirdo's Advice to the Lovelorn" was written by Zwigoff, operating under the nom de plume of "Prof. T. E. Zwigoff".

=== Filmmaking career ===
Zwigoff began his film career making documentary films, starting with 1985's Louie Bluie, a one-hour documentary about the blues and string band musician Howard Armstrong. Zwigoff had been inspired to locate and interview him after listening to a 30s recording, "State Street Rag", on which Armstrong played the mandolin.

Zwigoff worked on a documentary about R. Crumb and his two brothers for nine years, during which Zwigoff said he was "averaging an income of about $200 a month and living with back pain so intense that I spent three years with a loaded gun on the pillow next to my bed, trying to get up the nerve to kill myself". He completed Crumb in 1994; the critically acclaimed film won the Grand Jury Prize at the Sundance Film Festival, the DGA award, the NY Film Critics Circle Award, the LA Film Critics Award, and the National Society of Film Critics Award. Additionally, critic Gene Siskel named Crumb the best film of 1995 as did over ten other major film critics. It appeared on over 150 Ten Best Lists of important critics. When Crumb failed to receive an Oscar nomination, there was an outcry from the media which forced the Academy of Motion Picture Arts and Sciences to revamp their documentary nomination process that previously had been dominated by the distributors of documentary films.

Zwigoff's first fiction feature film was the comedy-drama Ghost World, based on Daniel Clowes' graphic novel of the same name. For this, Zwigoff and co-writer Clowes were nominated for an Academy Award for Best Adapted Screenplay and won the Independent Spirit Award. Ghost World was also nominated for two Golden Globe Awards and two AFI awards. USA Today and The Washington Post called it the best film of the year. Ghost World appeared on over 150 Ten Best Lists.

Zwigoff's next film was the 2003 black comedy Bad Santa whose star, Billy Bob Thornton, was nominated for a Golden Globe award. The film cost $23 million to make and grossed over $76 million worldwide.

His latest feature film was Art School Confidential (2006), whose best-known stars are John Malkovich, Jim Broadbent, and Anjelica Huston. Art School Confidential was Zwigoff's second collaboration with writer Daniel Clowes.

== Filmography ==
| Year | Title | Director | Producer | Writer | Notes |
|---|---|---|---|---|---|
| 1985 | Louie Bluie | Yes | Yes | No | Documentary |
| 1995 | Crumb | Yes | Yes | No | Documentary |
| 2001 | Ghost World | Yes | No | Yes | Nominated − Academy Award for Best Adapted Screenplay |
| 2003 | Bad Santa | Yes | No | No | |
| 2006 | Art School Confidential | Yes | No | No | |
| 2017 | Budding Prospects | Yes | Yes | No | Amazon pilot |
