= Robert Crumb =

American illustrator and cartoonist (b. 1943)

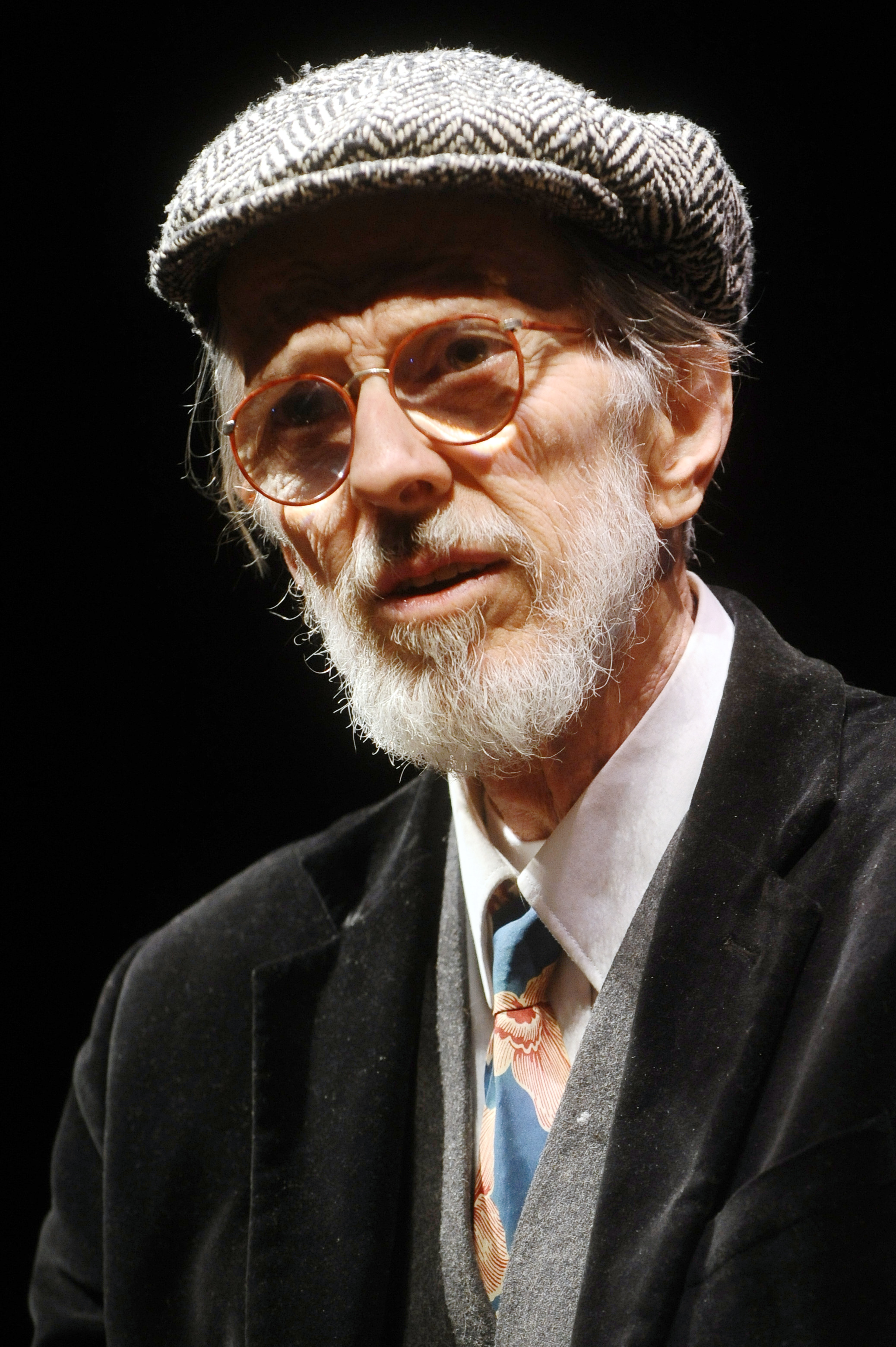
- Crumb in 2014
- Born: Robert Dennis Crumb; August 30, 1943 (age 83) Philadelphia, Pennsylvania, U.S.
- Areas: Cartoonist; writer; musician
- Pseudonym: R. Crumb
- Notable works: Zap Comix; Keep On Truckin'; Fritz the Cat; Mr. Natural; Weirdo; Introducing Kafka; The Book of Genesis
- Spouses: Dana Morgan (m. 1964; div. 1978); Aline Kominsky-Crumb (m. 1978; died 2022)
- Children: 2, including Sophie
- Relatives: Charles Crumb Jr. (brother); Maxon Crumb (brother)

Robert Dennis Crumb (/krʌm/; born August 30, 1943), known professionally as R. Crumb, is an American comic book artist. His work displays a nostalgia for American folk culture of the late 19th and early 20th centuries, and satire of contemporary American culture.

Crumb contributed to many of the seminal works of the underground comix movement in the 1960s, including being a founder of the first successful underground comix publication, Zap Comix, contributing to all 16 issues. He additionally contributed to the East Village Other and many other publications, including a variety of one-off and anthology comics. During this time, inspired by psychedelics and cartoons from the 1920s and 1930s, he introduced a wide variety of characters that became extremely popular, including countercultural icons Fritz the Cat and Mr. Natural, and the images from his Keep On Truckin' strip. Sexual themes abounded in all these projects, often shading into scatological and pornographic comics. In the mid-1970s, he contributed to the Arcade anthology; following the decline of the underground, he moved towards biographical and autobiographical subjects while refining his drawing style, a heavily crosshatched pen-and-ink style inspired by late 19th- and early 20th-century cartooning. Much of his work appeared in a magazine he founded, Weirdo (1981–1993), which was one of the most prominent publications of the alternative comics era. As his career progressed, his comic work became more autobiographical.

In 1991, Crumb was inducted into the comic book industry's Will Eisner Comic Book Hall of Fame, and in 1994, the Terry Zwigoff film Crumb explored his artistic career and personal life. He was married to cartoonist Aline Kominsky-Crumb, with whom he frequently collaborated. Their daughter, Sophie Crumb, has also followed a cartooning career.

== Early life (1943–1966) ==
Robert Crumb was born August 30, 1943, in Philadelphia to Catholic parents of English, Scottish, and Polish descent, spending his early years in West Philadelphia and Upper Darby. His father, Charles Vincent Crumb (January 16, 1914 – April 24, 1982), authored the book Training People Effectively.

His mother, Beatrice Loretta Crumb (née Hall; June 1, 1920 – May 29, 1997), was a housewife who reportedly abused diet pills and amphetamines. Crumb's parents' marriage was unhappy and the children were frequent witnesses to their parents' arguments. The couple had four other children: sons Charles Vincent Crumb Jr. (March 13, 1942 – February 1992) and Maxon Crumb (b. 1945), both of whom suffered from mental illness, and daughters Carol (April 15, 1941 – May 20, 2020) and Sandra (1946–1998). The family often moved between Philadelphia and Charles's hometown, Albert Lea, Minnesota. In August 1950, the Crumbs moved to Ames, Iowa. For two years, Charles, a Marine Corps sergeant, was an instructor in the Naval R.O.T.C. program at Iowa State College. The family moved to Milford, Delaware, when Crumb was twelve and where he was an average student whose teachers discouraged him from cartooning.

Inspired by Walt Kelly, Fleischer Brothers animation and others, Crumb and his brothers drew their own comics. His cartooning developed as his older brother Charles pushed him and provided feedback. In 1958 the brothers self-published three issues of Foo in imitation of Harvey Kurtzman's satirical Humbug and Mad which they sold door-to-door with little success, souring the young Crumb on the comic-book business. At fifteen, Crumb collected classic jazz and blues records from the 1920s to the 1940s. At age 16 he lost his Catholic faith.

== Career ==
=== Early work (1962–1966) ===
Crumb's father gave him $40 when he left home after high school. His first job, in 1962, was drawing novelty greeting cards for American Greetings in Cleveland, Ohio. He stayed with the company for four years, producing hundreds of cards for the company's Hi-Brow line; his superiors had him draw in a cuter style that was to leave a footprint on his work throughout his career.

In Cleveland, he met a group of young bohemians such as Buzzy Linhart, Liz Johnston, and Harvey Pekar. Dissatisfied with greeting card work, he tried to sell cartoons to comic book companies, who showed little interest in his work. In 1965, cartoonist Harvey Kurtzman printed some of Crumb's work in the humor magazine he edited, Help! Crumb moved to New York, intending to work with Kurtzman, but Help! ceased publication shortly after. Crumb briefly illustrated bubblegum cards for Topps before returning to Cleveland and American Greetings.

Crumb married Dana Morgan in 1964. Nearly destitute, the couple traveled in Europe, during which Crumb continued to produce work for Kurtzman and American Greetings, and Dana stole food. The relationship was unstable as Crumb frequently went his own way, and he was not close to his son, Jesse (born in 1968).

Front cover of Fritz the Cat

In 1965 and 1966, Crumb had a number of Fritz the Cat strips published in the men's magazine Cavalier. Fritz had appeared in Crumb's work as early as the late 1950s; he was to become a hipster, scam artist, and bohemian until Crumb abandoned the character in 1969.

Crumb was becoming increasingly uncomfortable with his job and marriage when in June 1965 he began taking LSD, a psychedelic drug that was then still legal. He had both good and bad trips. One bad trip left him in a muddled state for half a year, during which for a time he left Dana; the state ended when the two took a strong dose of the drug together in April 1966. Crumb created a number of his best-known characters during his years of LSD use, including Mr. Natural, Angelfood McSpade, and the Snoid. His work in the underground comics scene coincided with the rise of psychedelic drug use in the counterculture, leading to deals with psychedelic artists such as the Grateful Dead.

=== Zap and underground comix (1967–1979) ===
In January 1967, Crumb came across two friends in a bar who were about to leave for San Francisco; Crumb was interested in the work of San Francisco-based psychedelic poster artists, and on a whim, asked if he could join them. There, he contributed upbeat LSD-inspired countercultural work to underground newspapers. The work was popular, and Crumb was flooded with requests, including to illustrate a full issue of Philadelphia's Yarrowstalks.

Independent publisher Don Donahue invited Crumb to make a comic book; Crumb drew up two issues of Zap Comix, and Donahue published the first in February 1968, under the publisher name Apex Novelties. Crumb had difficulty at first finding retailers who would stock it, and at first his wife took to selling the first run herself out of a baby carriage.

Crumb met cartoonist S. Clay Wilson, an art school graduate who saw himself as a rebel against middle-class American values and whose comics were violent and grotesque. Wilson's attitude inspired Crumb to give up the idea of the cartoonist-as-entertainer and to focus on comics as open, uncensored self-expression; in particular, his work soon became sexually explicit, as in the pornographic Snatch he and Wilson produced late in 1968.

The second issue of Zap appeared in June with contributions from Wilson and poster artists Victor Moscoso and Rick Griffin. Artist H.Fish also contributed to Zap. In December, Donahue published the still-unreleased issue as #0 and a new third issue with Gilbert Shelton joining the roster of regulars. Zap was financially successful, and developed a market for underground comix.

Crumb was a prolific cartoonist in the late 1960s and early 1970s; at his peak output he produced 320 pages over two years. He produced much of his best-known work then, including his Keep On Truckin' strip, and strips featuring characters such as the bohemian Fritz the Cat, spiritual guru Mr. Natural, and oversexed African-American stereotype Angelfood McSpade. During this period, he launched a series of solo titles, including Despair, Uneeda (published by Print Mint in 1969 and 1970 respectively), Big Ass Comics, R. Crumb's Comics and Stories, Motor City Comics (all published by Rip Off Press in 1969), Home Grown Funnies (Kitchen Sink Press, 1971) and Hytone Comix (Apex Novelties, 1971), in addition to founding the pornographic anthologies Jiz and Snatch (both Apex Novelties, 1969).

Crumb's work also appeared in Nasty Tales, a 1970s British underground comic. The publishers were acquitted in a celebrated 1972 obscenity trial at the Old Bailey in London; the first such case involving a comic. Giving evidence at the trial, one of the defendants said of Crumb: "He is the most outstanding, certainly the most interesting, artist to appear from the underground, and this (Dirty Dog) is Rabelaisian satire of a very high order. He is using coarseness quite deliberately to get across a view of social hypocrisy."

=== Weirdo (1980–1993) ===
While meditating in 1980, Crumb conceived of a magazine with a lowbrow aesthetic inspired by punk zines, Mad, and men's magazines of the 1940s and 1950s. From 1981, Crumb edited the first nine issues of the twenty-eight issue run of Weirdo, published by Last Gasp; his contributions and tastes determined the contents of the later issues as well, edited by Peter Bagge until #17, and Aline for the remainder of the run. The magazine featured cartoonists new and old, and had a mixed response. Crumb's fumetti was so unpopular that it has never appeared in Crumb collections.

=== Later life (1994–present) ===
The Crumbs moved into a house in southern France in 1991, which is said to have been financed by the sale of six Crumb sketchbooks. The documentary Crumb, directed by Terry Zwigoff, appeared in 1994—a project on which Zwigoff had been working since 1985. The film won several major critical accolades.

From 1987 to 2005, Fantagraphics Books published the seventeen-volume Complete Crumb Comics and ten volumes of sketches. Crumb (as "R. Crumb") contributes regularly to Mineshaft magazine, which, since 2009, has been serializing "Excerpts From R. Crumb's Dream Diary".

In 2009, Crumb produced The Book of Genesis, an unabridged illustrated graphic novel version of the biblical Book of Genesis. In 2016, the Seattle Art Museum displayed the original drawings for The Book of Genesis as part of an exhibit entitled "Graphic Masters: Dürer, Rembrandt, Hogarth, Goya, Picasso, R. Crumb".

In January 2015, Crumb was asked to submit a cartoon to the left-wing newspaper Libération as a tribute for the Charlie Hebdo shooting. He sent a drawing titled "A Cowardly Cartoonist", depicting an illustration of the backside of "Mohamid Bakhsh", a reference to Muhammad, founder of Islam, and Ralph Bakshi, who directed the film adaptation Fritz the Cat (1972).

In 1989, in an issue of Hup magazine, Crumb had drawn a satirical comic, Point the Finger, lampooning businessman Donald Trump. This comic received more media attention in 2016, when Trump was elected U.S. president. Crumb has remained a vocal opponent of Trump and his administration, which he expressed in various interviews and comics.

R. Crumb's Sex Obsessions, a collection of his most personally revealing sexually oriented drawings and comic strips, was released by Taschen Publishing in November 2007. In August 2011, following concerns about his safety, Crumb cancelled plans to visit the Graphic 2011 festival in Sydney, Australia, after a tabloid labeled him a "self-confessed sex pervert" in an article headlined "Cult genius or filthy weirdo?"

=== Professional collaborations ===
A friend of comic book writer Harvey Pekar, Crumb illustrated over 30 stories of Pekar's in the comic book series American Splendor, primarily in the first eight issues (1976–1983). As The Complete Crumb Comics co-editor Robert Fiore wrote about their collaborations:

... in American Splendor, Crumb's work stood out for ... the way he really made Pekar's voice SING. His style embodied Pekar's voice ... He turned Pekar's scripts into pure comics, into something that would have been inferior in any other medium ... But I think what makes all of their collaborations work so well is the fact that Crumb is as sympathetic a collaborator as Pekar ever had. It's not just the fact that Crumb draws better than everybody else, he knew what to draw. Just as Pekar knew what to write ... Their mutual understanding of each other helped me appreciate each as artists and voices ...

Crumb collaborated with his wife, Aline Kominsky-Crumb, on many strips and comics, including Dirty Laundry Comics, Self-Loathing Comics, and work published in The New Yorker.

In 1978, Crumb allowed his artwork to be used as pictorial rubber stamp designs by Top Drawer Rubber Stamp Company, a collaboration between cartoonist Art Spiegelman, publisher Françoise Mouly, and people living at Quarry Hill Creative Center in Rochester, Vermont. R. Crumb's imagery proved to be some of the most popular designs produced by this avant-garde pictorial stamp company.

In the 1980s and 1990s, Crumb illustrated a number of writer Charles Bukowski's stories, including the collection The Captain Is Out to Lunch and the Sailors Have Taken Over the Ship and the story "Bring Me Your Love".

In 1983, illustrations by Robert Crumb accompanied ''Texas Crude: The How-To on Talkin’ Texan'', a compendium of regional slang compiled by Ken Weaver, former drummer of The Fugs.

In 1984–1985 Crumb produced a series of illustrations for the tenth anniversary edition of Edward Abbey's environmental-themed novel The Monkey Wrench Gang, published in 1985 by Dream Garden Press of Salt Lake City. Many of these illustrations also appeared in a 1987 Monkey Wrench Gang calendar, and remain available on T-shirts.

R. Crumb Comix, a theatrical production based on his work and directed by Johnny Simons, was produced in Fort Worth, Texas, in 1986. It was revived at Duke University in 1990, and co-starred Avner Eisenberg. The development of the play was supervised by Crumb, who also served as set designer, drawing larger-than-life representations of some of his most famous characters all over the floors and walls of the set.

Crumb's collaboration with David Zane Mairowitz, the illustrated, part-comic biography and bibliography Introducing Kafka (1993), a.k.a. Kafka for Beginners, is one of his less sexual- and satire-oriented, comparably highbrow works. It is well-known and favorably received, and due to its popularity was republished as R. Crumb's Kafka.

=== Musical projects ===
Crumb has frequently drawn comics about his musical interests in blues, country, bluegrass, cajun, French Bal-musette, jazz, big band and swing music from the 1920s and 1930s, and they also heavily influenced the soundtrack choices for his bandmate Zwigoff's 1995 Crumb documentary. In 2006, he prepared, compiled and illustrated the book R. Crumb's Heroes of Blues, Jazz & Country, with accompanying CD, which derived from three series of trading cards originally published in the 1980s.

Crumb was the leader of the band R. Crumb & His Cheap Suit Serenaders, for which he sang lead vocals, wrote several songs and played banjo and other instruments. Crumb often plays mandolin with Eden and John's East River String Band and has drawn four covers for them: 2009's Drunken Barrel House Blues, 2008's Some Cold Rainy Day, 2011's Be Kind To A Man When He's Down on which he plays mandolin, the latest (2022) "Goodbye Cruel World", on which he sings vocals, plays ukulele, mandolin and tiple. In 2013 he played on their album Take A Look at That Baby and also took part in the accompanying music video.

With Dominique Cravic, in 1986 he founded "Les Primitifs du Futur"—a French band whose eclectic music has incorporated Bal-musette, folk, jazz, blues and world music—playing on their albums "Cocktail d'Amour" (1986), "Trop de Routes, Trop de Trains" (1995), "World Musette" (1999) and "Tribal Musette" (2008). He also provided the cover art for these albums.

Crumb has released CDs anthologizing old original performances gleaned from collectible 78-rpm phonograph records. His That's What I Call Sweet Music was released in 1999 and Hot Women: Women Singers from the Torrid Regions in 2009. Chimpin' the Blues, a collaboration with fellow record collector Jerry Zolten that combines rare recordings with conversation about the music and the musicians, was released in 2013. Crumb drew the cover art for these CDs as well.

=== Album covers ===
Crumb cover artwork for the 1968 Big Brother and the Holding Company album Cheap Thrills

Crumb has illustrated many album covers, most prominently Cheap Thrills by Big Brother and the Holding Company and the compilation album The Music Never Stopped: Roots of the Grateful Dead.

Between 1974 and 1984, Crumb drew at least 17 album covers for Yazoo Records/Blue Goose Records, including those of the Cheap Suit Serenaders. He also created the revised logo and record label designs of Blue Goose Records that were used from 1974 onward.

In 1992 and 1993, Robert Crumb was involved in a project by Dutch formation the Beau Hunks and provided the cover art for both their albums The Beau Hunks play the original Laurel & Hardy music 1 and 2. He also illustrated the albums' booklets.

In 2009, Crumb drew the artwork for a 10-CD anthology of French traditional music compiled by Guillaume Veillet for Frémeaux & Associés. The following year, he created three artworks for Christopher King's Aimer Et Perdre: To Love And To Lose: Songs, 1917–1934.

== Style ==
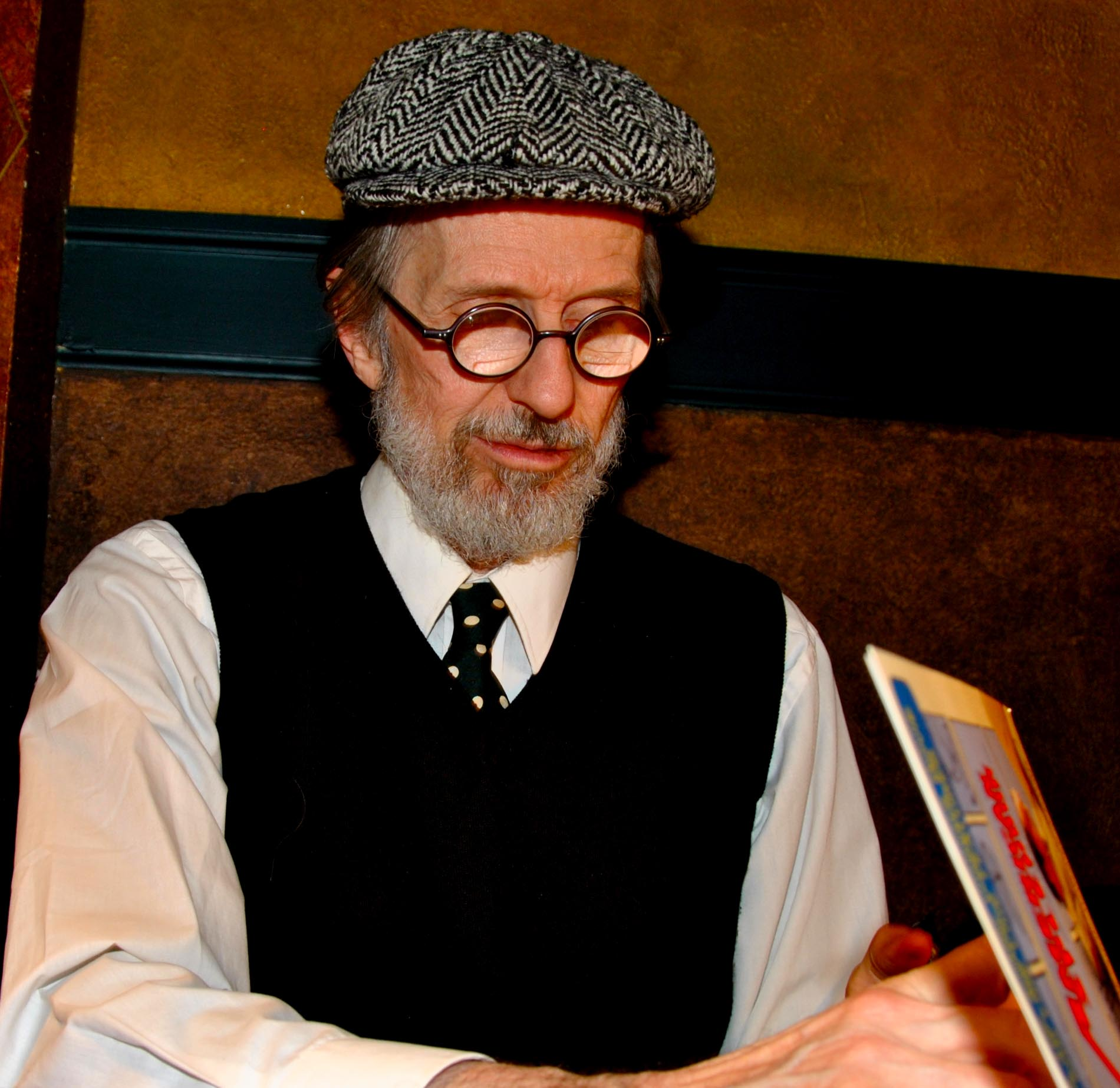
Crumb in 2010

As told by Crumb in his biographical film, his artwork was very conventional and traditional in the beginning. His earlier work shows more restraint in his style. In Crumb's own words, it was a lengthy drug trip on LSD that "left him fuzzy for two months" and led to him adopting the surrealistic, psychedelic style for which he has become known.

A peer in the underground comics field, Victor Moscoso, commented on his first impression of Crumb's work, in the mid-1960s, before meeting Crumb in person: "I couldn't tell if it was an old man drawing young, or a young man drawing old." Crumb's cartooning style has drawn on the work of cartoon artists from earlier generations, including Billy DeBeck (Barney Google), C. E. Brock (an old story book illustrator), Gene Ahern's comic strips, Basil Wolverton (Powerhouse Pepper), George Baker (Sad Sack), Ub Iwerks's characters for animation, Friz Freleng's drawings for the early Merrie Melodies and Looney Tunes of the 1930s, Sidney Smith (The Gumps), Rube Goldberg, E. C. Segar (Popeye) and Bud Fisher (Mutt and Jeff). Crumb has cited Carl Barks, who illustrated Disney's "Donald Duck" comic books, and John Stanley (Little Lulu) as formative influences on his narrative approach, as well as Harvey Kurtzman of Mad magazine fame.

== Recurring Crumb characters ==
- Angelfood McSpade (1967–1971) – large-built black woman drawn as an African native caricature. She is usually depicted being sexually exploited or manipulated by men.
- BoBo Bolinski (1968–1972) – a "burr-headed barfly"
- Devil Girl (1987–1995) – Amazonian type who is the object of Mr. Natural's obsession in later comics; real name Cheryl Borck
- Eggs Ackley (1968–1971) – cheerful young egg salesman
- Flakey Foont (1967–2002) – Mr. Natural's neurotic disciple
- Fritz the Cat (1965–1972) – feline con artist who frequently went on wild adventures that sometimes included sexual escapades
- Honeybunch Kaminski (1970–1972) – a large-built teenage runaway and girlfriend of ProJunior (Note: Crumb was introduced to his future wife Aline by mutual friends, who had noted an uncanny resemblance between her and the coincidentally-named Honeybunch Kaminski character. By the late 1970s, Kominsky-Crumb began calling her own comics avatar "The Bunch".)
- Lenore Goldberg (1969–1970) – leader of the Girl Commandos, a group of young revolutionary women
- Mr. Natural (1967–2002) – unreliable holy man
- Shuman the Human (1969–1977) – another neurotic male character
- The Snoid (1967–1979) – diminutive sex fiend and irritating presence

== In the media ==
In addition to numerous brief television reports, there are at least three television or theatrical documentaries dedicated to Crumb.

- Prior to the 1972 release of the film version of Fritz the Cat, Austrian journalist Georg Stefan Troller interviewed Crumb for a thirty-minute documentary entitled Comics und Katerideen on Crumb's life and art – which he describes as "the epitome of contemporary white North America's popular art" – as an episode of his Personenbeschreibung (literally "Person's description") documentary-format broadcast on the German TV network ZDF. The documentary also includes a "making-of" look at the then forthcoming Fritz movie, featuring production background interviews with Ralph Bakshi. By the mid-to-late 2000s, it could still be seen on rotation as part of the Personenbeschreibung series on the ZDF-owned digital specialty channel ZDFdokukanal (in 2009 replaced by the new channel ZDFneo).
- Arena: The Confessions of Robert Crumb (BBC Two, February 13, 1987)
- Crumb (1994), a documentary film by Terry Zwigoff

Crumb and his work are featured in Ron Mann's Comic Book Confidential (1988).

In the Star Wars movie Return of the Jedi (1983), the name of the character Salacious B. Crumb is derived from, and is an homage to, Crumb.

In the 2003 movie American Splendor, Crumb was portrayed by James Urbaniak. Crumb's wife Aline was quoted as saying she hated the interpretation and never would have married Robert if he was like that.

In 2005, Crumb brought legal action against Amazon.com after their website used a version of his widely recognizable "Keep On Truckin'" character. The case was expected to be settled out of court.

== Personal life ==
Crumb has been married twice. He first married Dana Morgan in 1964, who gave birth to their son Jesse in 1968. Crumb met cartoonist Aline Kominsky in 1972; their relationship soon turned serious and they began living together (on the same property shared by Dana Crumb). In 1978, Crumb divorced Dana and married Aline, with whom Crumb has frequently collaborated. In September 1981 Aline gave birth to Crumb's second child, Sophie. Robert, Aline, and Sophie moved to a small village near Sauve in southern France in 1991. Dana died in 2014. Aline died in 2022.

At age six, Crumb's son Jesse was featured as a character in Robert and Aline's Dirty Laundry Comics No. 1 (Cartoonists Co-Op Press, 1974); he also appeared as an adult in Terry Zwigoff's 1994 documentary film, Crumb. On New Year's Eve, December 31, 2017, Jesse was seriously injured in a car crash near Phillipsville, California, and died three days later; he was 49 years old.

Crumb was a member of the Church of the SubGenius.

== Reception ==
Fellow underground cartoonist Art Spiegelman remarked that upon meeting Crumb for the first time and seeing his work, he became 'satisfied' that Crumb would do all the revolutionary things in comics that he had initially hoped to do himself. He also called Crumb "one of the world's greatest cartoonists ever."

After issues 0 and 1 of Zap, Crumb began working with others, of whom the first was S. Clay Wilson. Crumb said, about when he first saw Wilson's work "The content was something like I'd never seen before, ... a nightmare vision of hell-on-earth ..." And "Suddenly my own work seemed insipid ..."

Crumb remains a prominent figure, as both artist and influence, within the alternative comics milieu. He is hailed as a genius by such comic book talents as Jaime Hernandez, Daniel Clowes, Chris Ware, Seth, Joe Sacco and Peter Bagge. Other cartoonists who have praised or cited Crumb's work as an influence include Hergé, Will Eisner, Moebius, Carl Barks, Charles M. Schulz, Lynda Barry and Alison Bechdel.

The art critic Robert Hughes called Crumb "the Brueghel of the last half of the twentieth century" and "the one and only genius the 1960s underground produced in visual art, either in America or Europe." Comic critic Andrew D. Arnold, writing for Time Magazine, stated that "Crumb's impact on his field, as well as his longevity as a crucial artist, rivals that of Picasso."

In the fall of 2008, the Institute of Contemporary Art in Philadelphia hosted a major exhibition of his work, which was favorably reviewed in The New York Times and in The Philadelphia Inquirer.

From October 10 – December 20, 2025, David Zwirner Gallery, Los Angeles, mounted R. Crumb: Tales of Paranoia, exhibiting new works by Crumb. In connection with the exhibit, Crumb released his first new comic book in 23 years also titled Tales of Paranoia. It was well reviewed by Le Monde in February 2026.

Crumb has frequently been the target of criticism due to his recurring themes of graphic sexual and violent abuse of women. Crumb himself has frequently admitted his hostility in relation to women:

I have these hostilities toward women. I admit it. ... It's out there in the open. ... It's very strong. It ruthlessly forces itself out of me onto the paper. ... I hope that somehow revealing that truth about myself is helpful, ... but I have to do it.

In addition to being the target of speculation by critical theorists and academic researchers, Crumb has also been held to scrutiny, by feminist writer Deirdre English. English has been quoted as saying that Crumb engages in "self-indulgent fantasies" through his work, continually blurring the line between entertainment and pornography.

He has been the target of criticism by colleagues as well, such as Trina Robbins, who called Crumb a "sexist pig" due to his sexual hostility towards women.

Crumb's work is also filled with unsavory images of African Americans (such as his recurring character Angelfood McSpade), who are often portrayed as indigent, tribal, and caricatured. Crumb often used African American characters as "tokens," appearing as re-used tropes such as clowns, tribesmen, athletes, etc. Researcher Edward Shannon interpreted the themes of Crumb's story containing marginalized Africans in "When the Niggers Take Over America" (published in 1993 in Weirdo) like this: "Crumb ... explores both the American Dream and its nightmare reflection; in this ... strip all-American white middle class children are depicted as cannibals eager to devour the devalued and dehumanized other." Crumb has responded to criticism by claiming that he did not invent racist caricature, but that they were part of the American culture in which he was raised. He sees his art as a criticism of the racist stereotype itself and assumed that the audience who read his work in the late 1960s were not racists and would understand his intentions.

=== Awards and honors ===
Crumb has received several accolades for his work, including the Inkpot Award in 1989, a nomination for the Harvey Special Award for Humor in 1990 and the Angoulême Grand Prix in 1999.

With Jack Kirby, Will Eisner, Harvey Kurtzman, Gary Panter, and Chris Ware, Crumb was among the artists honored in the exhibition "Masters of American Comics" at the Jewish Museum in New York City, from September 16, 2006, to January 28, 2007.

In 2017, Crumb's original cover art for the 1969 Fritz the Cat collection published by Ballantine sold at auction for $717,000, the highest sale price to that point for any piece of American cartoon art.

Crumb's work Eggs Ackley Among the Vulture Demonesses (1969) was adapted by fourteen year-old Vivian Berger in 1970 to become a Rupert Bear strip in Oz (magazine). This was a significant part of the Schoolkids Oz edition which was prosecuted in the UK under the Obscene Publications Act 1959

== Bibliography (selection) ==
=== Comics ===
- Zap Comix issues from 1 and 0 (1968) through at least 9 (1978) and several more (Apex Novelties, Print Mint, Last Gasp and other transient brand names, generally under Crumb's control, 1968–2016) – No. 0 and No. 1 are all drawn by Crumb, the rest have stories by others also
- Snatch Comics issues 1–3 (Apex Novelties/Print Mint, late 1968 – Aug. 1969) – No. 1 by Crumb and S. Clay Wilson, the rest have stories by others also
- R. Crumb's Fritz the Cat (Ballantine Books, New York, 1969) (no ISBN listed) – all Crumb; about half reprints
- R. Crumb's Comics and Stories: April 1964 (Rip Off Press, 1969) – all Crumb; single 10-pp. story about Fritz the Cat and incest (originally produced in 1964)
- Despair (Print Mint, 1969) – all Crumb
- Motor City Comics #1–2 (Rip Off Press, Apr. 1969 – Feb. 1970) – all Crumb
- Big Ass Comics #1–2 (Rip Off Press, June 1969 – Aug. 1971) – all Crumb
- Mr. Natural #1–3 (San Francisco Comic Book Company, Aug. 1970 – Kitchen Sink Enterprises, 1977) – all Crumb
- Uneeda Comix, "the Artistic Comic!" (Print Mint, Aug. 1970) – several short strips by Crumb. The longest, last and strongest continues onto the back cover in color.
- Home Grown Funnies (Kitchen Sink Enterprises, Jan. 1971) – all Crumb
- Your Hytone Comix (Apex Novelties, 1971) – all Crumb
- XYZ Comics (Kitchen Sink Press, June 1972) – all Crumb
- The People's Comics (Golden Gate Publishing Company, Sept. 1972) – all Crumb. This contains the strip in which there is Crumb Land (a black void), and also the strip in which Fritz the Cat is killed.
- Artistic Comics (Golden Gate Publishing Company, Mar. 1973) – all Crumb, with illustrations of (among others) Aline Kominsky
- Black and White Comics (Apex Novelties, June 1973) – all Crumb
- Dirty Laundry Comics #1–2 (Cartoonists Co-Op Press/Last Gasp, July 1974 – Dec. 1977) – R. Crumb and Aline Kominsky
- Best Buy Comics (Apex Novelties, 1979) – R. Crumb and Aline Kominsky
- Snoid Comics (Kitchen Sink Enterprises, 1980) – all Crumb
- Hup #1–4 (Last Gasp, 1987–1992) – all Crumb
- Id #1–3 (Fantagraphics, 1990–1991) – all Crumb
- Self-Loathing Comics (Fantagraphics, Feb. 1995 – May 1997) – R. Crumb and Aline Kominsky-Crumb
- Mystic Funnies #1–3 (Alex Wood, Last Gasp, Fantagraphics, 1997–2002) – all Crumb
- Mineshaft #5–present (Dec. 2000 –)
- Tales of Paranoia (Fantagraphics Books, November 2025)

=== Collections and graphic novels ===
- R. Crumb's Head Comix (Viking Press, 1968) – anthology; re-issued by Fireside Books in 1988, with a new introduction by Crumb; ISBN 0-671-66153-1
- R. Crumb's The Yum Yum Book (Scrimshaw Press, 1975) – originally created in 1963; later republished as Big Yum Yum Book: The Story of Oggie and the Beanstalk by Snow Lion Graphics/SLG Books, 1995
- R. Crumb Sketchbook series (Zweitausendeins, 1981–1997) – later republished in 10 volumes by Fantagraphics
- Bible of Filth (Futuropolis, 1986) – collection of Crumb's erotic comics from over the years
- The Complete Crumb Comics (Fantagraphics Books, 1987–2005) – 17 volumes
- Introducing Kafka (Totem Books, 1993) ISBN 1-84046-122-5 – with writer David Zane Mairowitz
- R. Crumb's America (SCB Distributors, 1995) ISBN 0-86719-430-8
- Crumb Family Comics (Last Gasp, 1998) ISBN 978-0867194616 – collection of stories by each member of the Crumb family, including Aline Kominsky-Crumb, Charles Crumb, Maxon Crumb, and Sophie Crumb
- Bob and Harv's Comics (Running Press, 1996) ISBN 978-1568581019 – collaborations with Harvey Pekar
- The R. Crumb Coffee Table Art Book (Little, Brown and Company, 1997) ISBN 0-316-16306-6 – edited and designed by Peter Poplaski
- Odds & Ends (Bloomsbury Publishing UK, 2001) ISBN 978-0-7475-5309-0
- The R. Crumb Handbook (2005). London: MQ Publications. ISBN 1-84072-716-0 – edited and designed by Peter Poplaski
- R. Crumb's Heroes of Blues, Jazz & Country (Harry N. Abrams, 2006) ISBN 978-0-81093-086-5
- R. Crumb's Sex Obsessions (Taschen, 2007)
- Your Vigor for Life Appalls Me (Turnaround Publisher, 2008) ISBN 978-1-56097-310-2
- The Book of Genesis (W. W. Norton & Company, 2009) ISBN 978-0-393-06102-4 OCLC 317919486
- The Book of Mr. Natural (Fantagraphics, 2010) ISBN 978-1-60699-352-1
- The Complete Record Cover Collection (W. W. Norton & Company, 2011) ISBN 978-0-393-08278-4
- The Sweeter Side of R. Crumb (W. W. Norton, 2011) ISBN 978-0-393-33371-8
- Drawn Together: The Collected Works of R. and A. Crumb (Boni & Liveright, 2012) ISBN 978-0-871-40429-9 – R. Crumb and Aline Crumb
- The Weirdo Years: 1981–'93 (Last Gasp, 2013) ISBN 978-0867197907
- Crumb – A Cartoonist's Life (Scribner, 2025) ISBN 978-1-982-14400-5 – Dan Nadel

== See also ==
- Charles Addams
- John M. Crowther
- Crumb (film)
- Edward Gorey
- Gary Larson
- Shel Silverstein
- Marvin Townsend
- Gahan Wilson

== Works cited ==
- Burgess, Steve (May 2, 2000). "R. Crumb". Salon. Archived from the original on June 10, 2012.
- Duncan, Randy; Smith, Matthew J. (2013). "Crumb, Robert". Icons of the American Comic Book: From Captain America to Wonder Woman. ABC-CLIO. pp. 158–168. ISBN 978-0-313-39923-7.
- Goldstein, Kalman (2013). "Robert Crumb (1943– )". In Cross, Mary (ed.). One Hundred People who Changed 20th-century America. ABC-CLIO. pp. 516–521. ISBN 978-1-61069-085-0.
- Harvey, Robert C. (1996). The Art of the Comic Book: An Aesthetic History. University Press of Mississippi. ISBN 978-0-87805-758-0.
- Holm, D. K. (2004). R. Crumb: Conversations. Conversations With Comic Artists series. University Press of Mississippi. ISBN 978-1-57806-637-7.
- Holm, D. K. (2005). Robert Crumb. Pocket Essentials. ISBN 978-1-904048-51-0.
- Huxley, David (2001). Nasty Tales: Sex, Drugs, Rock 'n' Roll and Violence in the British Underground – Spinal Comix History Series. Vol. 2, Primal. London: Critical Vision. p. 135. ISBN 978-1-900486-13-2.
- Lopes, Paul (2009). Demanding Respect: The Evolution of the American Comic Book. Philadelphia, PA: Temple University Press. pp. 80–82. ISBN 978-1-59213-443-4.
- Maremaa, Thomas (2004). "Who is this Crumb?". In Holm, D. K. (ed.). R. Crumb: Conversations. University Press of Mississippi. pp. 16–33. ISBN 978-1-57806-637-7.
- McKenna, Kristine (April 23, 1995). "Creep Show: A new film shines disturbing light on the very dark family secrets of cartoonist Robert Crumb. There's a lot more there than just Mr. Natural". Los Angeles Times.
- Simons, Johnny (April 2, 1990). "R. Crumb Comix". YouTube.
