= Piano drop =

Dropping a piano from a great height

A piano drop consists of dropping a piano, usually one already in poor shape, from a great height.

== Al Hansen ==
American artist Al Hansen may have performed the first piano drop (and the first "Happening" of any sort) when he dropped a piano off of a four-story building in Frankfurt while serving there with the 82nd Airborne from 1945 to 1948. Hansen later performed a number of piano drops in different locations, eventually concretizing this as a recurring performance under the name "Yoko Ono Piano Drop". These have continued past his 1995 death.

== 1968 in Duvall, Washington ==
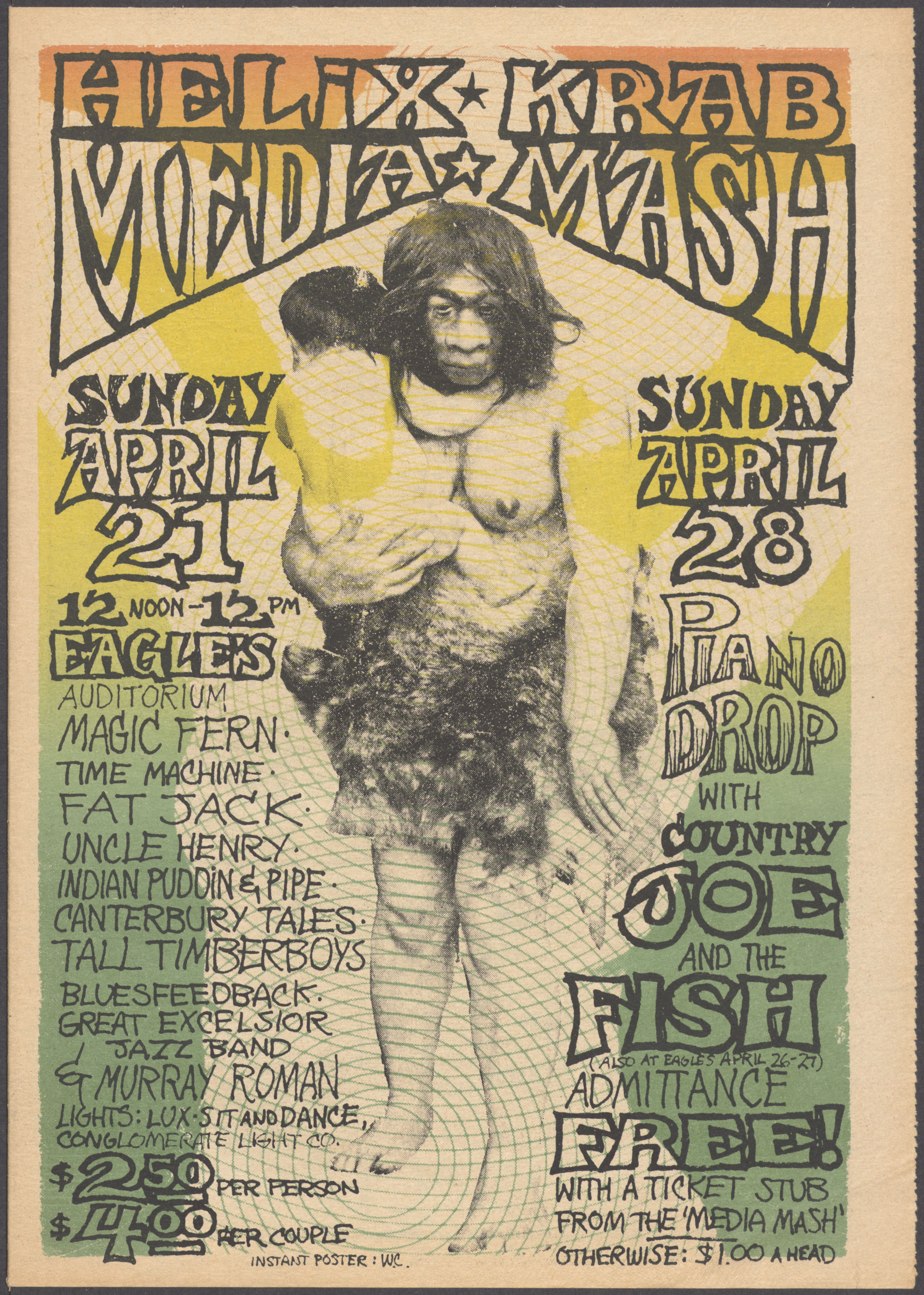
The April 11, 1968 issue of the Helix advertises two events under the joint name "Media Mash". On the left is a concert at Seattle's Eagles Auditorium. On the right, the piano drop in Duvall.

A piano drop occurred as part of a fundraiser for the Seattle underground newspaper Helix and non-commercial radio station KRAB, the predecessor to today's KSER, Sunday, April 28, 1968, in Duvall, Washington. The day's events consisted of the piano drop and a concert by Country Joe and the Fish.

The event was first conceived by artist Gary Eagle and musician Larry Van Over. According to Walt Crowley, they had listened to a KRAB broadcast of a recording of a piano being destroyed by a sledgehammer at an earlier benefit for Seattle's Central Area Motivation Program (a predominantly African-American anti-poverty group). However, the KRAB archive site says Crowley must be mistaken, and there was no such program. They conjecture that it might have been a broadcast of a program of theirs in which artists related to the Fluxus movement destroyed a piano with sledgehammers. Another version of the story, in (among other places) Smithsonian magazine, says they had accidentally dropped a piano off a truck and "thought it sounded kind of cool."

In any case, Eagle and Van Over approached Helix founder Paul Dorpat about the idea of dropping a piano from a helicopter. With Dorpat's support, they obtained the 500-pound piano and found a pilot experienced in transporting pianos.

Although they had expected only about 300 people to attend, approximately 3,000 people came out to Van Over's farm in Duvall to witness the drop. The drop, from roughly 150 feet, proved to be more logistically difficult than expected: the pilot miscalculated his slowing down and, in order to keep the helicopter stable, had to release the cable prematurely. The piano missed the pile of logs they were aiming for "by several yards, struck the soft earth, and imploded with a singularly unmusical whump."

Several writers have seen the large turnout for the event as being the immediate inspiration for the multi-day, outdoor rock festivals of the following years. The Piano Drop led directly to the Sky River Rock Festival and Lighter Than Air Fair on Labor Day weekend, 1968 (many of the same people were involved). The more controversial question is the extent to which Sky River inspired the various festivals that followed. Paul Dorpat mentions the partial precedent of Monterey Pop but remarks that, in contrast to that event, the Piano Drop and the Sky River festival that followed were held in spaces that had not previously been set up as concert venues.

Decades later, the Jack Straw Foundation—the successor to KRAB that now operates KSER—assembled some surviving pieces of the piano for a show called Piano Drop at their Jack Straw Cultural Center. A number of avant garde composers and musicians including Amy Denio and Lori Goldston participated in a February 23, 2019 performance making musical use of these remnants.

== Massachusetts Institute of Technology (MIT) ==
Every spring, the residents of Baker House at MIT drop an old, irreparable piano from the roof of their six-story building. This event takes place on Drop Date (a.k.a. Drop Day), the last date one can drop classes at MIT.

This tradition began in 1972, and does not appear originally to have had any connection with Drop Day.
