= Dirty Duck (character) =

Publication information
- Publisher: National Lampoon (1972–1976); Playboy (1977–c. 2011)
- First appearance: Los Angeles Free Press (Spring 1971)
- First comic appearance: Air Pirates Funnies #1 (Last Gasp, July 1971)
- Created by: Bobby London

In-story information
- Species: Duck
- Place of origin: Earth
- Partnerships: Weevil

Dirty Duck is a fictional character created by underground comix artist Bobby London. The style of the strip is an homage to George Herriman's Krazy Kat.

The character is not related to the 1975 film Down and Dirty Duck. While promoted under the abbreviated title Dirty Duck, the film has no connection to London's character or comics.

== Publication history ==
London originally created the Dirty Duck character in 1970 to appear in an unsigned "basement" strip that would run underneath Dan O'Neill's syndicated Odd Bodkins strip. The cartoon strips planned to run underneath O'Neill's "Odd Bodkins" never saw print. The first person who succeeded in helping the strip see print was Gilbert Shelton, who ran it under his Fat Freddy's Cat strip in the Los Angeles Free Press in early spring of 1971.

The character's first long-form appearance was in Air Pirates Funnies #1 (Last Gasp, July 1971). John Bagley's San Francisco-based Company & Sons published The Dirty Duck Book #1 in December 1971.

Shortly afterwards, London was contacted by the publishers of National Lampoon, where Dirty Duck ran monthly for several years alongside the work of London's wife Shary Flenniken, who was drawing Trots and Bonnie for them. London moved the strip to Playboy magazine around 1976, where it ran until 1987. Dirty Duck later returned to Playboy and continues to run there as of 2011.

Almost all of the strips would have been collected in a hardcover collection from IDW Publishing under the Top Shelf imprint, but it has continuously been delayed since 2017.

== Characters ==
The main characters are two anthropomorphic animals, a cigar-smoking duck (usually referred to as "Mr. Duck") and his assistant, Weevil. They live in human society and are often seen in the company of naked human women. In the comic strip running in Playboy, Mr. Duck is a wealthy and elderly gentleman with a lecherous streak and a sharp (if sardonic) wit. Weevil is his long-suffering butler.
