= Helix (newspaper) =

United States underground newspaper (1967–1970)

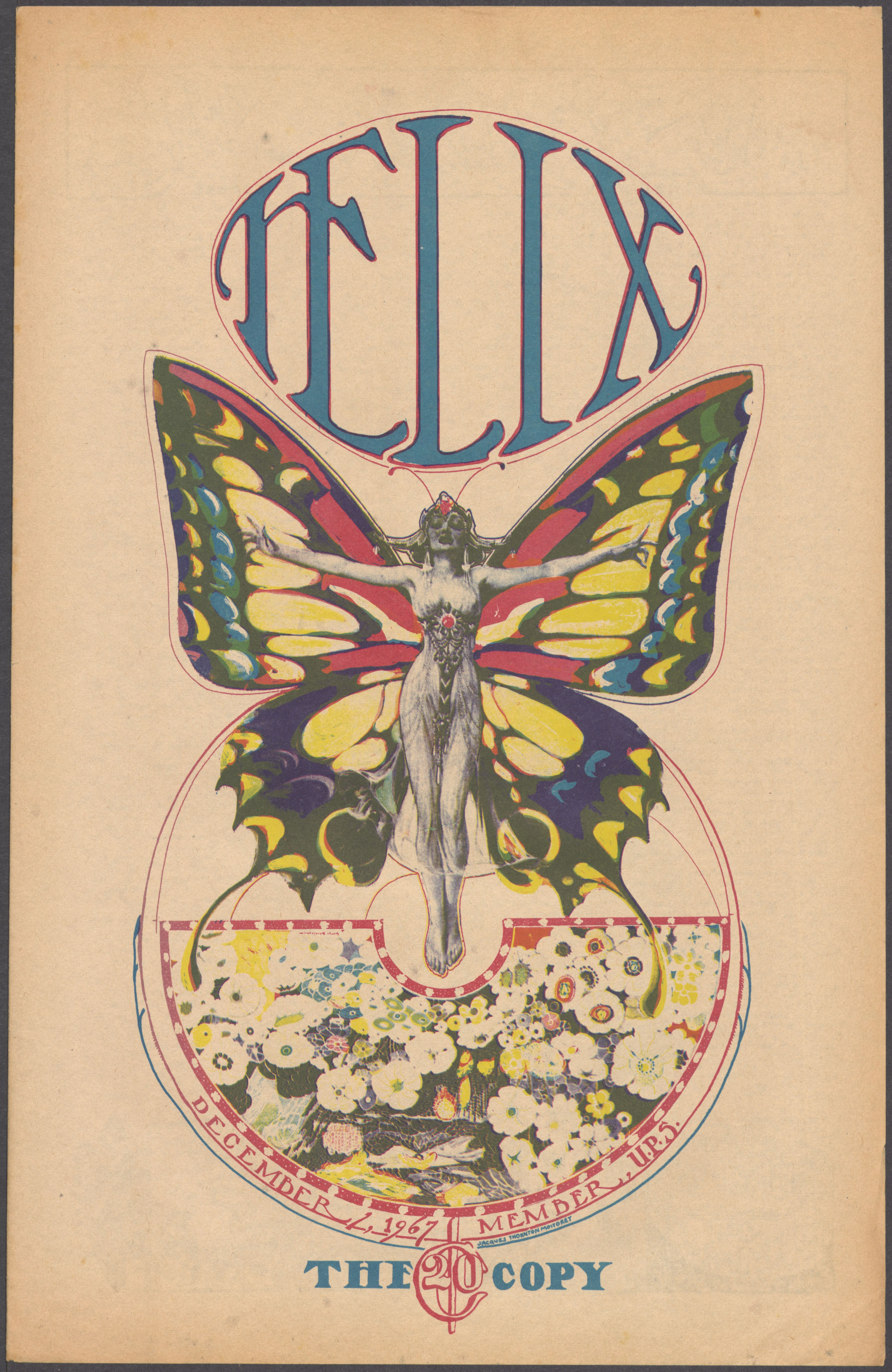
- December 1, 1967 issue (vol.2, #6)
- Type: Biweekly newspaper
- Format: Tabloid
- Editor: Paul Dorpat, Walt Crowley
- Founded: 1967; 59 years ago
- Ceased publication: 1970; 56 years ago
- Headquarters: Seattle, WA
- Circulation: 15,000

The Helix was an American biweekly newspaper founded in 1967 after a series of organizational meetings held at the Free University of Seattle involving a large and eclectic group including Paul Dorpat, Tom Robbins, Ray Collins, and Lorenzo Milam. A member of both the Underground Press Syndicate and the Liberation News Service, it published a total of 125 issues (sometimes as a weekly, sometimes as a biweekly) before folding on June 11, 1970.

The first issue was produced by Dorpat with $200 in borrowed capital, out of a rented storefront on Roosevelt Way NE in Seattle's University District. After being turned down by the first printers they approached, they found a printer in Ken Monson, communications director of the International Association of Machinists local, who had recently acquired a printing press. 1500 copies were printed of the first issue. Walt Crowley, soon to play a major role in the paper, was not in the initial group, but claimed to have been the first person to buy a copy. By the fourth biweekly issue sales had reached 11,000 copies. After the first two issues a split-fount rainbow effect was sometimes used to print psychedelically colorful front covers; issues averaged 24 pages, with illustrations and graphics clipped from old magazines and having little to do with the adjoining copy crammed into the interior pages.

In September 1967 Helix was evicted from the office on Roosevelt Way. On October 15 they opened their new office about 1 kilometre (0.62 mi) south at 3128 Harvard Avenue E. on the other side of University Bridge, where they were to remain for the rest of the paper's existence.

On at least one occasion, a young man was arrested for hawking the Helix on a University streetcorner, and another arrested immediately after for giving away the papers that were left behind when the first man was hauled off into a police car.

Contents of the paper were a New Left/hippie mélange of underground politics, psychedelic graphics, drug culture, bulletins from the Liberation News Service, and rock music reviews, with much coverage of rock festivals in the Pacific Northwest including the Sky River Rock Festivals and concerts at Eagles Auditorium. Frequent contributors included Tom Robbins, while Walt Crowley was responsible for much of the paper's freewheeling design. The Blue Moon Tavern and the Last Exit on Brooklyn coffee house functioned as the paper's unofficial hangouts. In 1970 Robert Glessing reported that although the paper did not pay salaries it was providing food and housing for 11 full-time staffers.

After the demise of the Helix, several former staffers, including Crowley and Roxie Grant, went to work at a new community center called the U District Center, at the corner of NE 56th and University Way. Several attempts were made by different groups in Seattle to launch a new paper to take the place of the Helix, including the New Times Journal, Puget Sound Partisan, Sabot, Seattle Flag, Seattle Sound, and the Sun, but none succeeded in recapturing the spirit or the success of the Helix.

Crowley and Dorpat later went on to be two of the three founders of HistoryLink, along with Crowley's wife Marie McCaffrey.

== See also ==
- List of underground newspapers of the 1960s counterculture
