= Graphic Classics =

Comic book anthology series

- The cover of Graphic Classics vol. 1: Edgar Allan Poe (first edition)

Publication information
- Publisher: Eureka Productions
- Format: Ongoing series
- Genre: fantasy, adventure, horror, science fiction
- Publication date: 2002 – 2016
- No. of issues: 24

Creative team
- Written by: Mort Castle, Andrea Grant, Mat Johnson, Rafael Nieves, Tom Pomplun, Christopher Priest, Jon Proudstar, Trina Robbins, Alex Simmons, Richard Van Camp
- Artist(s): Gerry Alanguilan, Arnold Arre, Gabrielle Bell, M. K. Brown, John Coulthart, Maxon Crumb, Robert Crumb, Anton Emdin, Hunt Emerson, Shary Flenniken, Simon Gane, Rick Geary, Stephen Hickman, Matt Howarth, Molly Kiely, Milton Knight, Peter Kuper, Roger Langridge, Terry LaBan, Keith Mallett, Michael Manning, Cynthia Martin, Mark Nelson, Alex Niño, Spain Rodriguez, Nestor Redondo, Johnny Ryan, Tom Sutton, Brad Teare, Carlo Vergara, Trevor Von Eeden, Skip Williamson, S. Clay Wilson, Ashley Wood
- Editor: Tom Pomplun

Graphic Classics is a comic book anthology series published by Eureka Productions of Mount Horeb, Wisconsin. Graphic Classics features adaptations of literary classics by authors such as Arthur Conan Doyle, H. P. Lovecraft, and Edgar Allan Poe, with art by top professionals, many of whom hail from the underground or alternative comics world. Created and edited by Tom Pomplun, the series began publication in 2002.

Designed for ages 12 and up, 22 of the Graphic Classics volumes have been included in Diamond Comic Distributors list of recommended books for the American Library Association's Common Core Standards curricula.

== Publication history ==
Graphic Classics was an outgrowth of Rosebud, a literary journal co-founded by Pomplun which also included comics. In 2002, Pomplun left Rosebud to start Graphic Classics. Because of budget restrictions, one of the first decisions Pomplun made was to restrict adaptations in the series to works in the public domain (e.g., those published before 1923).

The series started out in black-and-white; with vol. #17 (Science Fiction Classics, 2009) the books began being printed with full-color interior pages. Most volumes contain at least a few reprint of comics adaptations published by other companies, some going as far back as the 1970s. Six of the first eight volumes are in second editions (with the first volume, on Edgar Allan Poe, in its fourth edition), often with additional material than in the first edition.

Graphic Classics vol 6: Ambrose Bierce was nominated for the 2003 Bram Stoker Award for Best Illustrated Narrative.

Graphic Classics vol. 10: Horror Classics (2004) was the first volume focusing on a theme rather than a single author.

Eureka produced a special 68-page Free Comic Book Day Graphic Classics edition in 2008. It featured adaptations of Edgar Allan Poe's "The Black Cat," (adapted by Rod Lott and Gerry Alanguilan), Arthur Conan Doyle's "John Barrington Cowles" (adapted by Alex Burrows and Simon Gane), Lord Dunsany's "A Narrow Escape" (adapted by Milton Knight), Mary Shelley's "The Dream" (adapted by Antonella Caputo and Anne Timmons), and a one-page Ambrose Bierce fable (illustrated by Mark Dancey).

Graphic Classics vol. 22: African American Classics (2011) was adapted and illustrated almost entirely by African American comics creators.

== Titles ==
Vol.	Title	Pub. Year/Later editions	Notes
1	Graphic Classics: Edgar Allan Poe	2002/2010 (4th)	Includes adaptations of "The Raven," "The Bells", and "The Tell-Tale Heart", as well as Spain Rodriguez's "The Inheritance of Rufus Griswold," which originally appeared in Arcade #7 (Fall 1976). 40 new pages in fourth edition includes "The Fall of the House of Usher," "The Masque of the Red Death," and "Never Bet the Devil Your Head."
2	Graphic Classics: Arthur Conan Doyle	2002/2005	100+ pages of new material in the second edition; includes Kin Platt/Nestor Redondo story originally done for Pendulum Press in 1974 and reformatted with the original Doyle text restored by art director Tom Pomplun
3	Graphic Classics: H. G. Wells	2002/2014 (3rd)	Includes The Invisible Man by Alex Niño, "In the Abyss" by John Pierard, and "The Man Who Could Work Miracles" by Dan O'Neill. Plus, a Time Machine portfolio by Nicola Cuti; a comics presentation of Orson Welles' radio broadcast of The War of the Worlds by Nick Miller & Antonella Caputo; and comics adaptations by Skip Williamson and Brad Teare. Also illustrated stories by Rick Geary, Jim Nelson, Shary Flenniken, M. K. Brown, and Milton Knight.
4	Graphic Classics: H. P. Lovecraft	2002/2007	Adaptations by Richard Corben, Rick Geary, Matt Howarth, Mark A. Nelson, S. Clay Wilson, Maxon Crumb, George Kuchar, Steven Cerio, Ashley Wood, Stephen Hickman, John Coulthart, Gerry Alanguilan, Arnold Arre, Jim Nelson, including The Dream-Quest of Unknown Kadath, a limited-edition portfolio of six Lovecraft-inspired fantasy prints by Tom Sutton. 75+ new pages in the second edition; includes The Shadow Out of Time.
5	Graphic Classics: Jack London	2003/2006	Thirteen stories, including "The Wit of Porportuk", "A Thousand Deaths," "To Kill a Man," and "Told in the Drooling Ward," adapted by the likes of Rick Geary, Milton Knight, Matt Howarth, Trina Robbins, Antonella Caputo, Nick Miller, Hunt Emerson, Peter Kuper, Mark A. Nelson, and Marc Arsenault. Cover by Arnold Arre, with a comics biography of London by Mort Castle and Roger Langridge. 50+ new pages in second edition.
6	Graphic Classics: Ambrose Bierce	2003/2008	Nine stories and thirty short fables of war, horror and satire, including adaptations of "The Monk and the Hangman's Daughter", "An Occurrence at Owl Creek Bridge," and excerpts from The Devil's Dictionary, by over 40 illustrators. 70+ new pages in second edition.
7	Graphic Classics: Bram Stoker	2003/2007	Features The Lair of the White Worm and five other Stoker stories; plus two excerpts from Dracula and a Dracula gallery illustrated by 15 artists (including Spain Rodriguez). 48 new pages in second edition.
8	Graphic Classics: Mark Twain	2004/2007	Includes The Mysterious Stranger and "Ghost Story;" 38 new pages in second edition.
9	Graphic Classics: Robert Louis Stevenson	2004	Includes comic adaptations of "The Bottle Imp," The Suicide Club, and a two-part interpretation of Dr. Jekyll & Mr. Hyde by Simon Gane and Michael Slack. Plus a special feature by Maxon Crumb and a collection of Stevenson's short fables and poems, with art by Dan O'Neill, Shary Flenniken, Hunt Emerson, Johnny Ryan, Michael Manning, and others. Cover art by Michael Slack.
10	Graphic Classics: Horror Classics	2004	Features stories by Edgar Allan Poe, H. P. Lovecraft, Saki, W. W. Jacobs, Jack London, Fitz James O'Brien, Honoré de Balzac, Howard Garis, Bret Harte, Olive Schreiner, Ambrose Bierce, and Clark Ashton Smith. Includes Poe's "Some Words with a Mummy," Jacob's "The Monkey's Paw," and H.P. Lovecraft's "The Thing on the Doorstep" adapted by Michael Manning. Also includes adaptations of "Professor Jonkin's Cannibal Plant" and "The Beast of Averoigne".
11	Graphic Classics: O. Henry	2005	Includes adaptations of "The Ransom of Red Chief," illustrated by Johnny Ryan; "The Cabollero's Way," by Mark A. Nelsonl and a new O. Henry "sequel" by Mort Castle and Rick Geary. Also contributions from Gerry Alanguilan, Shary Flenniken, and more.
12	Graphic Classics: Adventure Classics	2005	Thirteen stories and poems, including adaptations of O. Henry, Rudyard Kipling, Arthur Conan Doyle, Robert W. Service, Edith Nesbit, Robert Louis Stevenson, and more.
13	Graphic Classics: Rafael Sabatini	2006	Includes Captain Blood; contributors include Roger Langridge, Carlo Vergara, Milton Knight, Gerry Alanguilan, Rich Tommaso, and Hunt Emerson. Features a comics biography of Sabatini by Mort Castle.
14	Graphic Classics: Gothic Classics	2007	Includes Ann Radcliffe's The Mysteries of Udolpho, adapted by Antonella Caputo and Carlo Vergara; Jane Austen's gothic parody Northanger Abbey, by Trina Robbins and Anne Timmons; Poe's "The Oval Portrait," by Malaysian illustrator Leong Wan Kok; J. Sheridan Le Fanu's Carmilla, by Rod Lott and Lisa K. Weber.
15	Graphic Classics: Fantasy Classics	2008	Includes Mary Shelley's Frankenstein, adapted by Rod Lott and Skot Olsen, with a prologue illustrated by Mark A. Nelson. Also H. P. Lovecraft's The Dream-Quest of Unknown Kadath, adapted by Ben Avery and Leong Wan Kok; L. Frank Baum's "The Glass Dog", adapted by Antonella Caputo and Brad Teare; Nathaniel Hawthorne's "Rappaccini's Daughter," adapted by Lance Tooks; and Lord Dunsany's poem "After the Fire," illustrated by Rachel Masilamani.
16	Graphic Classics: Oscar Wilde	2009	Includes The Picture of Dorian Gray, adapted by Alex Burrows and Lisa K. Weber; "The Canterville Ghost", by Antonella Caputo and Nick Miller; "Lord Arthur Savile's Crime" by Rich Rainey and Rich Tommaso; and an adaptation of Salome, by Molly Kiely.
17	Graphic Classics: Science Fiction Classics	2009	Includes 26-page adaptation of Stanley G. Weinbaum's "A Martian Odyssey" by Ben Avery and George Sellas; H. G. Wells' The War of the Worlds; Jules Verne's "Year 2889," Arthur Conan Doyle's "The Disintegration Machine;" E. M. Forster's "The Machine Stops;" and shorts by Lord Dunsany and Hans Christian Andersen.
18	Graphic Classics: Louisa May Alcott	2009	Includes Little Women, adapted by Trina Robbins and illustrated by Anne Timmons; also "A Whisper in the Dark," "The Rival Prima Donnas," and "Lost in a Pyramid," along with two poems and children's stories.
19	Graphic Classics: Christmas Classics	2010	Includes Charles Dickens' A Christmas Carol, an early F. Scott Fitzgerald tale, an O. Henry western, "The Strategy of the Were-Wolf Dog" by Willa Cather, a Christmas horror story by Fitz-James O'Brien, "The Adventure of the Blue Carbuncle" by Arthur Conan Doyle, Clement C. Moore's "A Visit from St. Nicholas," and a letter from Santa Claus to Mark Twain's daughter.
20	Graphic Classics: Western Classics	2011	Includes an adaptation of Zane Grey's Riders of the Purple Sage, illustrated by Cynthia Martin; as well as stories by Bret Harte, Willa Cather, Gertrude Atherton, Robert E. Howard, and John G. Neihardt; with adaptations by the likes of Trina Robbins and Arnold Arre. Also an early Hopalong Cassidy story illustrated by Dan Spiegle (who illustrated the Hopalong Cassidy newspaper strip in the 1950s).
21	Graphic Classics: Edgar Allan Poe's Tales of Mystery	2011	Includes new, color adaptation of "The Murders in the Rue Morgue," as well as "The Facts in the Case of M. Valdemar," "The Man of the Crowd," "The Pit and the Pendulum," and "The Inheritance of Rufus Griswold" (illustrated by Spain Rodriguez; originally published in Arcade in 1976)
22	Graphic Classics: African-American Classics	2011	Co-edited by Lance Tooks. Includes Florence Lewis Bentley's "Two Americans," adapted by Alex Simmons and Trevor Von Eeden; W. E. B. Du Bois' "On Being Crazy," by Kyle Baker; Langston Hughes' "The Negro," by Stan Shaw and Afua Richardson; and Zora Neale Hurston's "Filling Station" by Arie Monroe and Milton Knight.
23	Graphic Classics: Halloween Classics	Sept. 2012	Five scary tales, each with an EC Comics-style introduction by Mort Castle. Features Washington Irving's "The Legend of Sleepy Hollow," Arthur Conan Doyle's "Lot No. 249," Mark Twain's "The Curious Dream," H. P. Lovecraft's "Cool Air."; and an adaptation of The Cabinet of Dr. Caligari.
24	Graphic Classics: Native American Classics	Feb. 2013	Co-edited by Tom Pomplun, John E. Smelcer, and Joseph Bruchac. Features stories and poems like Zitkala-Sa's "The Soft-Hearted Sioux," Charles Eastman's "On Wolf Mountain", Handsome Lake's "How the White Race Came to America", Alex Posey's "Wildcat Bill", and E. Pauline Johnson's "The Cattle Thief."
25	Graphic Classics: Canine/Feline Classics	July 2014	Stories by Ray Bradbury, P. G. Wodehouse, James Anthony Froude, O. Henry, Ambrose Bierce, Algernon Blackwood, Franz Kafka, Saki, Joe R. Lansdale, Joseph Jacobs and Robert E. Howard
26	Graphic Classics: Vampire Classics	June 2017	Stories by Bram Stoker, Craig Wilson, Robert E. Howard, Ray Bradbury, Mort Castle, H. G. Wells, Robert Louis Stevenson

== See also ==
Other comic book adaptations of literature:

- Classics Illustrated
- Marvel Classics Comics
- Marvel Illustrated
- PAICO Classics, Indian series similar to Classics Illustrated
- Pendulum Illustrated Classics, published by Pendulum Press
- Les Grands Classiques de la littérature en bande dessinée
