= Bobby London =

American cartoonist

- Born: Robert Alan London; June 29, 1950 (age 76) New York City, U.S.
- Areas: Cartoonist, Artist
- Notable works: Dirty Duck; Merton of the Movement; Air Pirates collective Popeye comic strip
- Spouses: Shary Flenniken (div.; m. c. 1972–1976)

Robert London (born June 29, 1950) is an American underground comix and mainstream comics artist. His style evokes the work of early American cartoonists such as George Herriman, Cliff Sterrett and Elzie Crisler Segar.

== Biography ==
As a child, London was "pen pals" with comedian Stan Laurel, who provided critiques on London's youthful cartoons. His first professional cartooning was for the left-wing National Guardian in the late 1960s. He created his underground newspaper comic strip Merton, in New York in 1969. He also drew cartoons for Rat Subterranean News before moving to the West Coast.

The nucleus of the Air Pirates collective began to form in c. 1970 when London met Ted Richards at the office of the Berkeley Tribe, an underground newspaper where both were staff cartoonists. (London later drew a highly fictionalized account of their experiences at the Tribe in his story "Why Bobby Seale is Not Black" in Merton of the Movement [Last Gasp's "Cocoanut Comix" imprint, Oct. 1972]). In 1970, London and Richards attended the Sky River Rock Festival at Washougal, Washington, and met Shary Flenniken and Dan O'Neill at the media booth, where Flenniken was producing a daily Sky River newsletter on a mimeograph machine. Before the festival was over the four of them produced a four-page tabloid comic, Sky River Funnies, mostly drawn by London.

In early 1971, O'Neill invited Flenniken and Richards, along with London and Gary Hallgren, a Seattle cartoonist they had met at the festival, to San Francisco to form the Air Pirates collective. The Air Pirates lived together in a warehouse on Harrison Street in San Francisco, where London and Flenniken began a relationship that turned into a short-lived marriage.

London developed the raunchy Dirty Duck strip in 1971. Dirty Duck had been originally published by the Los Angeles Free Press and subsequently in books like Air Pirates Funnies and The Fabulous Furry Freak Brothers. His non-duck work also appeared in underground titles such as Merton of the Movement, Left Field Funnies, Douglas Comics, Facts O' Life Funnies and El Perfecto Comics. In 1972, London moved Dirty Duck to the original National Lampoon where it was a regular monthly feature until 1976; it continued to run in Playboy for over 25 years.

In 1978, London won the Jury Yellow Kid Award for Best Artist-Writer, presented at Lucca Comics & Games. He contributed illustrations to The New York Times Op-Ed page from 1976 to 1981, and wrote and drew the Popeye syndicated daily comic strip for King Features from 1986 to 1992, at which point he was fired for doing an allegory about abortion.

In the summer of 2000, London unveiled a family-oriented comic feature for Nickelodeon Magazine entitled Cody. He then wrote and storyboarded episodes of Dexter's Laboratory and The Powerpuff Girls for Cartoon Network in 2003 and 2004, and contributed character designs for King Neptune and Mindy of The SpongeBob SquarePants Movie. In 2018, London contributed to the design of Mike Quinn's character Agnes Packard for the Mighty Magiswords second season episode, "Pachydermus Packard and the Camp of Fantasy".

London returned to comic books for the first time in 30 years with contributions to the Grammy-nominated box set from Rhino Records, Weird Tales of The Ramones, in 2005.
