= Mort the Dead Teenager =

Limited series published by Marvel Comics

- Cover of Mort the Dead Teenager #1 (Dec. 1993), featuring Mort Graves (center, also in corner box) and Teen Death (behind, in car). Art by Gary Hallgren

Publication information
- Publisher: Marvel Comics
- Schedule: Monthly
- Format: Limited series
- Genre: Black comedy Coming-of-age story Supernatural
- Publication date: October 19, 1993-January 18, 1994
- No. of issues: 4

Creative team
- Written by: Larry Hama
- Penciller: Gary Hallgren
- Inker: Gary Hallgren
- Letterer: Gary Hallgren
- Colorist(s): Gary Hallgren (Issue 1); Hanne Kjeldegaard (Issues 2-4)
- Editor(s): Bobbie Chase; Rob Tokar

Mort the Dead Teenager is a limited series published by Marvel Comics. The comic centers on the titular Mort who dies while street racing and returns as an incorporeal being who is tormented by both the living and the dead. Despite its offbeat humor and bizarre scenario, it has been designated as officially being part of the Marvel Universe, though the continuity is unspecified.

The comic, while unpopular on release, was the subject of several attempts to be adapted into film as well as a primetime animated series intended for UPN.

== Publication history ==
According to writer Larry Hama, the idea for the comic came about during a meeting where many Marvel executives were considering optioning several of the publisher's comics to be adapted into film and television productions, although few of the successful comic adaptations at that time were based on Marvel titles. Hama recalls a sort of elevator pitch where he "went in and came up with some new stuff that wasn't really a superhero, that somebody could do fairly cheap. A youth market-type thing." The executives approved of the concept, and shortly after pitching the name alone, Hama began writing the comic. Hama later recalled that while working at Marvel, he received praise from Stan Lee for only two works: Mort, and The 'Nam.

The miniseries ran for four issues dated December 1993 to March 1994, with writing by Hama while the art was handled by former Air Pirates member Gary Hallgren. The logo was designed by letterer Todd Klein, who, according to his blog, had only saved one marker sketch pass of the initial design, which had minimal changes made before finalization. A preview was issued in mid-to-late-1993 to comics distributors and shop owners, in an effort to gauge interest in pre-ordering the series for sale to consumers via Marvel's burgeoning direct market strategy. The preview was printed in monotone and scanned from the manuscripts.

The distinct Brookhaven, Long Island setting was chosen due to Hama and Hallgren's area of residence at the time of production. Much of the two's interests were incorporated into the comic, such as Studebaker cars, the Long Island Rail Road, and their experience in a band. Said band, a blues/brass outfit called The K-Otics, appears in the third issue as an easter egg with caricatures of the group's members; all of whom were New York-area comic artists and writers at the time of the band's creation.

Hallgren, through his since-defunct website, has confirmed that he retains the original manuscripts and color guides for the series, which were for sale at one point before 2016. The original illustrations for the covers are no longer in his possession, having been sold as a set at the Chicago Alternative Comics Expo. Available to purchase on the site were also signed copies of the comic, but due to the website's closure in early 2023, they are unavailable for purchase.

== Plot ==
Mort Graves is a slacker teen from Mistake Beach, Long Island, New York, who, in a futile attempt to impress his crush Kimberly Dimenmein, races against her boyfriend Lance Boyle in his father's recently refurbished 1950 "bullet-nose" Commander coupe. While doing so, he gets struck and beheaded by an oncoming train and ends up in the afterlife where he meets Teen Death, the son of the actual Death.

Hell is already full and Heaven is closed for repairs. With no other choice due to his morally dubious nature, Mort is sent back to the living world where he is now a ghostly being and discovers that his family is in "mourning" for him (actually more concerned with other things relating to his death). To Mort's pleasure, Kimberly seems genuinely saddened at his death while Maureen, a tough motorcycle-riding teen who was friends with him prior to the incident, accuses her of not caring about him prior. Mort fails to realize that Maureen clearly had feelings for him and perceives her behavior as bullying, though his friends, Slick and Weirdo, can see it's obvious.

After an unintentional reaction to a haunting in a movie theater, Mort is visited by Teen Death and is dragged to a processing division of the Netherworld for youth casualties, wherein he is told that his haunting isn't up to the quality expected, and is advised to try better in another setting: his high school. Mort soon discovers that he wasn't very well-known or respected at his school, and attacks the school grief psychologist through her hearing aid after an argument between Maureen and Kimberly. Slick and Weirdo then advertise auditions for a garage band, and invite Mort to come. At dinner that night, Mort is left alone with his younger brother Kyle who demands that he pay back his loans owed to him and his relatives or suffer a blackmailing. After a stressful, existential conversation with his family, Mort attends Slick and Weirdo's band tryouts and are quickly joined by Kimberly and Maureen. Jealous of the chemistry between Slick and Kimberly, Mort attempts to sabotage their equipment, but Weirdo's dad loves their new sound and names himself their manager, much to Mort's (and the others') chagrin.

The band, Positive Feedback (named by Weirdo's dad, objected to by his son), treks to a formerly major club to perform with Mort following along. Weirdo threatens Mort with ensuring the performance goes smoothly, due to the loans his father took out to finance the band that could have him and his parents evicted if not paid. The green room in the club is occupied by a hard rock outfit named Bombs and Hoses, who don't take kindly to the band and Weirdo's parents. While in the bathroom, Mort once again gets dragged back to the Netherworld by Teen Death who tells him that he needs to begin haunting again or he will be left in purgatory. After 'Hoses' finishes their act, destroys equipment, and misnames Positive Feedback as "Positive Feedbags", the band gets on stage to perform with Mort creating a wide variety of strange effects to please Teen Death's quota, only to realize they were playing to an empty house, save Weirdo's confused, drunk, and distraught parents. After coming home from the previous night's show, Mort discovers that Weirdo's parents were robbed and their car stripped, and that his father's debt from financing the band is inescapable.

Fed up with the stress of non-existence, alongside his friend's predicament, Mort confronts Teen Death who proposes three different potential outcomes had he not died. The first involves him having a menial job at a car wash and getting put into an irreversible coma after being drafted in an upcoming war with Canada. The second has him marry an overweight Kimberly, still working the car wash, while all of his friends have become famous or otherwise successful, and the last has him quitting his car wash job to travel the world where he is presented a moral dilemma in Tibet: the secret to eternal happiness or a bag of gold, choosing the latter, with which he buys a NASCAR stock racer, only for aliens to attack during the car's inaugural race with him as driver.

Mort returns to the present where his family still doesn't respect him enough, Weirdo has become homeless and is bunking with his grandmother, Slick kills his dream of becoming a musician and gets into science fiction like his parents, Maureen changes her style and starts dating Lance, and Kimberly runs away to become a beat poet. After laughing at Kimberly's performance, Mort awakens to realize the whole ordeal was a dream and is alive again. However, he seems destined for failure as he leaves in his dad's Studebaker to relive the incident that caused his demise.

== Characters ==
=== The supernatural ===
- Mort Graves – An inept loser teenager who was beheaded by a train in a racing accident. It seems that before his death, he already had a pathetic life. After his death, his "life" is actually much worse with his family being totally indifferent to his situation. He has a crush on Kimberly and is oblivious to Maureen's clear feelings for him, interpreting her grief as bullying towards Kimberly. As a ghost, he has the ability to detach his head, float around, and become invisible and otherwise intangible to living people. He also has the ability to affect electronic equipment using a technique he named "ectoplasmic shock". (Note: Rendered in The Official Handbook entry as "electoplasmic shock", apparently confusing the substance that Marvel hero Slapstick consists of.) Mort can also look into daydreams of others and interact with film as if he were in a movie, and create objects or props alongside multiple apparitions of himself in the event of a haunting.
- Teen Death – The son of Death who takes in dumb teens who died in ridiculous predicaments. He loves his job and apparently likes to torment Mort. Despite this, he has admitted that he does care for him to some degree. Teen Death acts as a tour guide/employer for Mort in the Netherworld, where many bizarre subdivisions exist for different deaths. He shows a particular interest in trains and video games, alongside trying to get Mort to haunt his family.

=== Mort's family ===
- Bruce Graves (Note: Has a different name in the pitch trailer.) – Mort's father who seems more concerned with the state of his Studebaker than the loss of his son.
- Wendy Graves – Mort's mother who is upset about how things have been going for the family. Is the most caring of Mort's family post-death, though is still bitter that Mort left so soon.
- Kyle Graves (Note: Does not appear in the pitch trailer.) – Mort's younger brother who is an expert in finances and wants his brother's room. Known blackmailer amongst his family.
- Cyndi Graves – Mort's older sister who uses his death as a way to pick up boys. It's implied that Cyndi's fashion taste was much more reserved and modest before the events of the comic, but after Mort's death, she's taken on a more bombastic style and approach to relationships.
- Digby "Grandpa" Graves (Note: Full name unknown prior to Handbook listing.) – Mort's crotchety grandfather. Lives at a nursing home and doesn't get out much. Likes fast food and Wheel of Fortune.

=== Living teens ===
- Kimberly Dimenmein – A beautiful brunette teen who is admired by Mort. She is into poetry and singing, and though despite showing no interest in the titular loser prior to his death, openly showed sadness for him and dedicated several poems to him and his demise. It's never made clear her true feelings for Mort despite her creative output, though she does participate in Positive Feedback while not being familiar with his friends. Is Lance's on-and-off girlfriend, until she leaves him to run away from home in the hopes of becoming a performance artist. She assumes lead vocals and songwriting for Positive Feedback after her audition in the second issue.
- Maureen Redding (Note: Name changed in the 2006 Cooper draft of the shelved film adaptation.) – A tough biker girl who showed an interest in Mort while being a platonic friend. After his death, she was noticeably distraught, and accused Kimberly of latching onto a tragedy for attention (Mort interprets this as bullying, and as such, harbors a misunderstood resentment towards her). Maureen was a childhood guitar prodigy, and though she dislikes Kimberly, she was nevertheless willing to play alongside her when she joined Slick and Weirdo's band. Maureen mentions that the Harley-Davidson motorcycle she rides is her dispatched brother's, who was currently serving at Guantanamo Bay during the events of the comic. Maureen later sells the bike once she begins dating Lance in Kimberly's absence, apparently unbeknownst to her brother.
- Lance Boyle – Kimberly's handsome jock boyfriend. Initiates the race that lead to Mort's death, but inadvertently comes to his funeral because of Kimberly's objections. He later leaves Kimberly after she runs away from home and decides to hook up with Maureen.
- George "Slick" Slikowski – One of Mort's friends. He is a tall lanky boy with long hair. Slick seems to have a womanizing personality, but after Mort's death, he grows a strong fascination with Kimberly, which the latter is particularly afflicted by. His parents are science fiction fans. Plays the bass in Positive Feedback.
- Reardon "Weirdo" Weedlow – One of Mort's friends. He is a short stout boy with a half shaved head and sunglasses. More cooler and reserved than Slick, Weirdo is the voice of reason amongst Mort's friends, typically playing straight man to Slick's comic. His parents are doting and extremely well-meaning to the point of destruction. Plays the drums in Positive Feedback.
- The Kallikaks – Off-handedly mentioned siblings in a well-disliked family. Their name is derived from The Kallikak Family, a 1912 book promoting the theory of eugenics. According to Kyle, who holds a photo of the event as blackmail, Mort had stuck his tongue in the ear of sister Roxie, the only named member of the family.

=== Other adults ===
- The Weedlows – Weirdo's parents. His father had dreams of being in a band as a teenager, and finances his son's musical endeavor through questionably-sourced loans. Because of Positive Feedback's failed performance, the family are unable to pay back their dues, and are evicted from their home.
- Mr. Weisenheimer – Mort's homeroom teacher. Doesn't like his students, and they don't much care for him in return. Is presumed to have been teaching for a long amount of time, with his age a common insult.
- Dr. Caligari – School psychologist. Her name is derived from the 1920 German horror film The Cabinet of Dr. Caligari. Uses a hearing aid, and is taken advantage of by Mort's homeroom to get out of classwork. Is the first victim of Mort's "ectoplasmic shock".
- Bombs and Hoses – A destructive rock band that plays ABCD's before Positive Feedback. They are a parody of Guns N' Roses, with each member resembling the then-current 1990–1993 lineup. Generally disrespectful to their follow-ups, referring to them as "Positive Feedbags" and destroying their equipment.

== Proposed adaptations ==
=== Film ===
Screenshot from the pitch trailer, depicting Mort (Mason Gamble, left) and Kimberly (Jessica Simpson, right). Gamble and Simpson are currently the only two named and identified cast members of the trailer (aside from Simpson's father as an extra), with Larry Hama noting that many others were young unknown actors on cable television dramas at the time of production.

A film version of Mort the Dead Teenager had been in development since 1997. Robert Zemeckis and Steven Spielberg were attached to produce at DreamWorks with Larry Hama and Joe's Apartment director John Payson writing the script. Elijah Wood was in talks for the starring role of Mort and Dominique Swain as his love interest. (Note: In all cited news articles and press reports given about the known iterations of the project, Kimberly is not named as a character role, instead a "love interest" descriptor is used. As confirmed in the 8-minute pitch trailer and Jim Cooper's scripts, Kimberly was to be a character in the film, but no news sources name her directly.)

Coming Attractions, an IGN-affiliated movie news site, received a scoop on the film in 2000, stating, according to an anonymous source:

A buddy of mine at Dreamworks [sic] who does accounting (how he knows this, being in accounting I don't know) told me that Mort the Dead Teenager was dead as a project. He said in the wake of Columbine and media-related incidents of teen violence, as well as all those stupid teen "horror" films, the honchos at Dreamworks: first tried to put this thing in turnaround, second, threw it on the proverbial trash-heap. It just sort of seems a little too tasteless and not nearly low-brow enough for todays [sic] post There's Something About Mary audience.

Production had switched sometime around 2002 with Quentin Tarantino and Madonna replacing Spielberg and Zemeckis as producers at A Band Apart, later Maverick Films once Tarantino left the project, with Dean Paraskevopoulos hired to direct. Jessica Simpson was reportedly cast as Mort's love interest a year later, with test footage shot by cinematographer Dean Cundey that also featured Mason Gamble as Mort. Hama later stated that he had no large involvement with any of the attempted adaptations despite writing a screenplay, and that his involvement with the future of the comic ended after it was finished.

Prior to being assigned writer of the Marvel Zombies project, The Walking Dead co-creator Robert Kirkman believed he was to be assigned a reboot comic of Mort supposedly created to drum up hype for the announced film adaptation, though there was no planned comic. Kirkman recalled,

And then I said, "If you ever want anything done with zombies in it, let me know!" And I was totally joking! And I think that day, or maybe the next day, there was an announcement that they were going to do a Mort the Dead Teenager movie, which I guess never happened, and he (Tom Brevoort) was like, "Oh, I don't know...maybe there's something...let me get off the phone and talk to somebody." And I'm like, "What are you talking about, Tom?" And he said, "I think I have an idea for something you can do...hang on!" And I thought he was gonna call me up and be like, "Hey, you wanna do this Mort the Dead Teenager book?"

And then, like two or three weeks later, Ralph Macchio called and he said they were doing this Ultimate Fantastic Four arc where we're trying to make it look like the Ultimate FF meet the FF from the Marvel Universe, but what they're actually doing is meeting this zombie Fantastic Four.

And I said, "Well, that sounds crazy." (Note: Though no official word from Marvel states such, a possibility exists that there was to be a tie-in comic for the cancelled film, as evidenced by a trademark filing on February 8th, 2005 for new print media, including comics, posters, and trading cards.)

As of 2025, a Mort film has not been made and any projects with development plans are assumed to have been shelved or cancelled. Hama had mentioned that some of the Simpson test footage was cut into a pitch trailer, which was being shopped around as late as 2009 according to a since-deleted tweet from television writer Kevin Biegel.

The complete 8-minute-long pitch trailer was uploaded to YouTube on September 14, 2025, with unfinished special effects. A 1998-dated script is currently located at Indiana University via the Lilly Library's Michael Uslan Archives, available for research reading.

==== The Cooper drafts ====
On May 13, 2022, an Internet Archive collection titled "Retro movie screenplays 3 of 5" was published. One of the files contained was a draft for a Mort film dated February 1st, 2006, written by screenwriter and future Jeopardy! contestant Jim Cooper. Cooper's draft was credited to Zachary Feuer Films, a production company helmed by All the Queen's Men producer and prior Maverick collaborator Zachary Feuer. The uploaded script was a later revision of a draft intended for use by DreamWorks.

The script has several differences from the comic, with various plot threads involving Mort witnessing a soul being transplanted back into a dead woman's body and wanting Kimberly to do the same to him, Teen Death and Maureen having a star-crossed relationship as the former looks to apply for a job in the creation department of the afterlife, Kimberly coming to terms with her fate, love for Mort and prior suicidal attempts, and Lance becoming victim to Mort's ethereal revenge after the latter discovers Kimberly would be trapped in wedlock by Lance, caused by her becoming pregnant on the night of the homecoming dance. The script also describes Mort as seventeen years old and a member of his school's newspaper staff alongside Maureen, who is prominently featured as his platonic best friend, interacting post-death, with Slick and Weirdo absent.

Prior to Internet Archive, the script was available to read on ScriptHive, uploaded on August 27, 2021. Metadata for the original file dates February 27, 2006, with open possibility it was leaked directly from DreamWorks shortly after internal use access.

A 1998-dated script by Cooper, also for DreamWorks, marked as "2nd polish", is available to read for research purposes via Indiana University's Lilly Library, with minor differences between the 2006 revision including scenes involving Mort's arrival in the Netherworld and a suicide intervention changed, alongside added dialogue in the latter draft.

=== Animated television ===
In November 1996, half a year before DreamWorks' adaptation was announced, Wizard scooped, via their film/TV adaptation news feature "Trailer Park", that an animated television adaptation of the comic was in early development for UPN, but this would also not come to fruition. Tapped to produce the series was New World Animation, prior to their sale to News Corporation.

Greg Johnson, at the time known for his screenwriting on Biker Mice from Mars and the 1994 Iron Man series, contributed an undated script (Note: Internet Archive user KlonoaPrime, uploader of the script, catalogs the date as 1996, fitting it alongside Wizard's scoop.) for the project, detailing a story involving Mort inadvertently causing a zombie outbreak after being assigned to Teen Death's clerical work as punishment, forcing him to prevent another fatality so he can continue with his, Slick, and Weirdo's plans to peep at Kimberly skinny-dipping. The script references several contemporary moments in pop culture, including the recall of Cabbage Patch Snacktime Kids dolls, the murder trial of O. J. Simpson, Thelma and Louise, and the "Got Milk?" campaign.

The 38-page script, titled "Death Pays All Debts...Except For Mort's", was uploaded to the Internet Archive on April 3, 2026. New World's sale to News Corporation, alongside the bankruptcy of Marvel Entertainment Group effectively halted any further production on the series, and as such, plans to continue were scrapped, though the series was seemingly still in production by mid-1997 according to an issue of Marvel Visions. No other development material has surfaced.

== Legacy ==
Stan Lee apologized for the miniseries presentation of Mort in a 1996 Marvel Vision interview, explaining that, while he kept an eye on rival company DC Comics' output, he watched all publishers and their comics, saying "there's a lot of good stuff out there for every taste", with the idea of Mort being worthy of holding an ongoing series.

In 1994, the miniseries was serialized in Norwegian comics magazine Magnum, which at the time was popular for previously publishing The 'Nam alongside the then-current run of The Punisher. Norway is also the only country that received a complete physical edition of the series, as a part of the Pocketserien collection of paperback digest comics in 1997.

Spanish comics blog ADLO! Novelti Librari, through frequent contributor Jónatan K. Sark, (Note: The username of the author is sarkdice and his articles are categorized as such on the blog.) published an article in 2022 titled "Le Mort d'Marvel", as a retrospective of the comic and the multiple attempts to adapt it into a film. Sark jokingly speculates, through a page from Marvel Age promoting the series, that Mort could have possibly been named after Marvel editor Mort Todd due to his mention in the magazine's paragraph about the comic. Hama deconfirmed this in a Facebook comment answering a similar question, explaining that Mort simply took his name after the French mort, meaning "death".

In an interview, Hallgren noted that his favorite character to draw in the comic was Mort, calling him a "more real Archie." He commented that he believes the comic has aged well, comparing the contemporary enjoyment to reading novels that don't include the usage of cell phones.

=== Cancelled revival ===
On October 27, 2009, Marvel Characters Inc. filed a trademark for "Comic books; Comic magazines; Printed periodicals in the field of comic book stories and artwork" under the name Mort the Dead Teenager. The purported usage of the trademark was later confirmed by artist Shawn Crystal in 2025, in that there was an intended reboot comic being developed "in 2010-ish" with him and writer Duane Swierczynski helming. Crystal stated, in a Facebook post, that the revival was planned as a five-issue miniseries, and that he and Swierczynski had completed 10 pages before the project was abruptly cancelled by Marvel.

The miniseries was never formally announced, and no art has resurfaced in the time after its cancellation. The trademark for the planned revival was abandoned on July 1, 2013.

== See also ==
- Haunting Starring Polterguy: 1993 Electronic Arts game with related premise
- List of unproduced film projects based on Marvel Comics
- List of unproduced television projects based on Marvel Comics
- My Boyfriend's Back: 1993 film with plot similarities to the unproduced film adaptation
- Nth Man: The Ultimate Ninja: Another Hama Marvel project with creative similarities to Mort.
