= Split-fount inking =

Printing technique

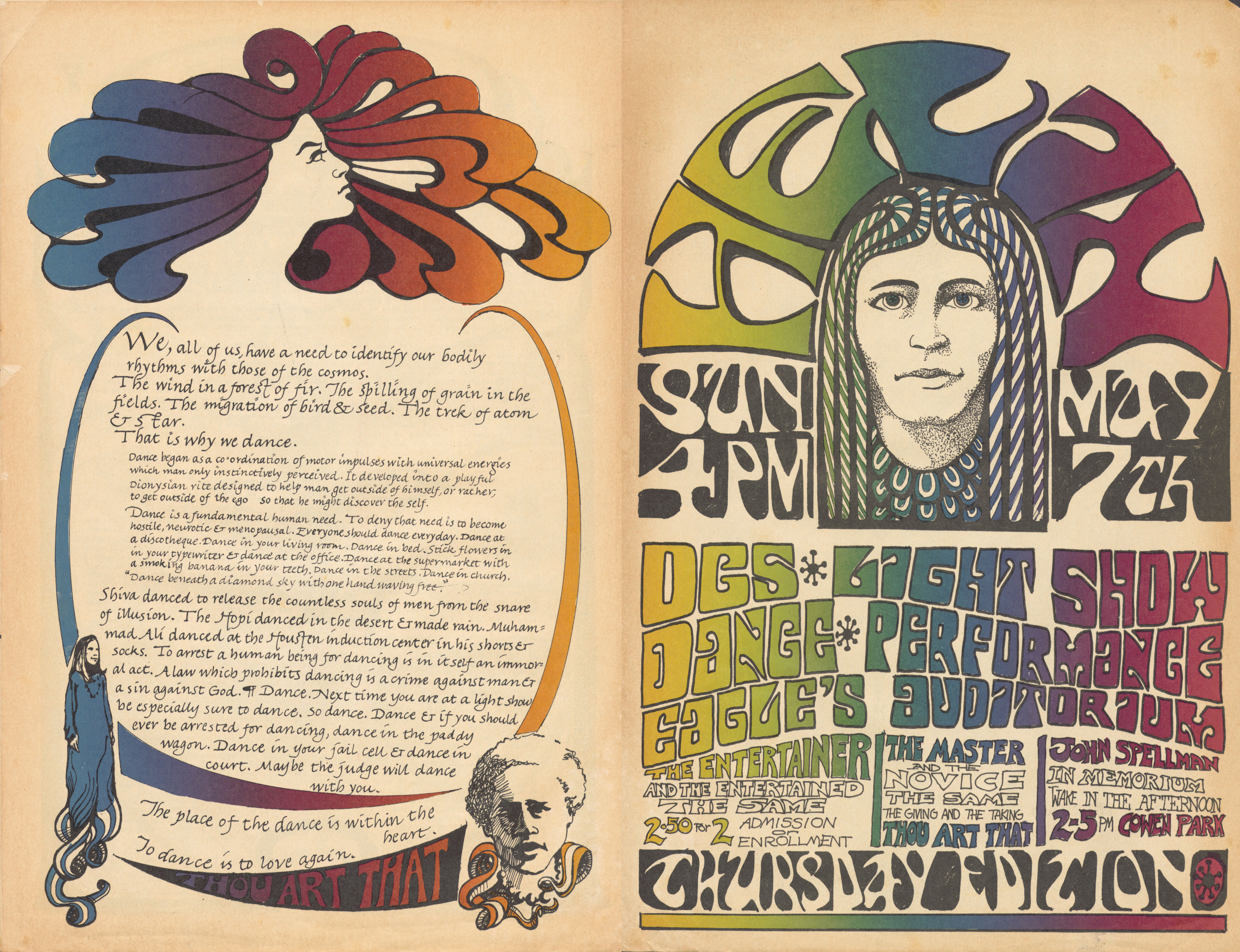
Split-fount inking ("rainbow roll") in a 1967 copy of the Seattle underground paper Helix. Art is by Gary Eagle

Split-fount inking also known as split-fountain inking is a printing technique which allows for subtle gradations of multiple colors without the use of more complex and costly methods such as color separation.

In order to achieve these effects, an ink tray normally intended to receive a single color of ink is instead carefully loaded with two or more separate colors, which then bleed together when applied to the rollers, dynamically creating continuous ranges of hue transitioning from one to the other of the originally applied colors.

In use from at least as early as the 1870s, the technique was notably used in the 1960s by poster creators such as underground comic artist Gilbert Shelton, who designed posters for a music venue in Austin, Texas called The Vulcan Gas Company. The rainbow-like gradients and vivid swirls of color achievable via split-fount inking were effects that matched well with the psychedelic aesthetic of these works.
