= Debra Teare =

American painter

Debra Ann Campbell Teare (July 11, 1955 – November 10, 2018) was an American artist, a founding member of The International Guild of Realism, and "One of the most successful trompe-l'œil painters today. Before switching to oils, Teare spent the first portion of her career "large photorealistic drawings in black and white" charcoals.

Teare was born to Don Spencer Campbell and Julia Picket Campbell and grew up in the Cache Valley of Utah and studied Illustration at Utah State University (though dropped out of the course). She began her career in New York City and lived the final years of her life in Providence, Utah.

Her work usually consisted of precise photo-realist paintings of still life objects.

She married artist Brad Teare in 1983. She had one daughter, Ashley.
