= Walt Crowley =

American left-wing politician and historian

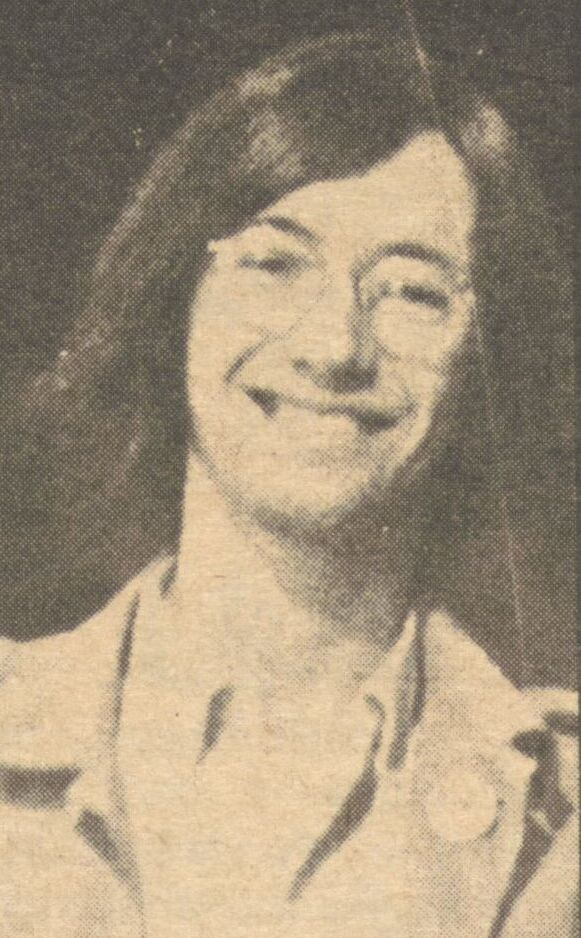
- Walt Crowley, 1968
- Born: Walter Charles Crowley; June 20, 1947; Ferndale, Michigan, U.S.
- Died: September 21, 2007 (aged 60); Seattle, Washington, U.S.
- Occupations: Historian, journalist, community activist
- Spouse: Marie McCaffrey (m. 1982)

Walter Charles Crowley (June 20, 1947 – September 21, 2007) was an American historian and activist from Washington state. He first entered the public sphere in Seattle through his involvement with the social and political movements of the 1960s, especially the underground press. He later became more widely known as a local television personality and for his pioneering work as a local historian, including co-creating the website HistoryLink.org, which he considered to be his crowning achievement.

== Life ==
Born in Ferndale, Michigan, the only child of engineer and inventor Walter A. Crowley and Violet King (now Kilvinger), Walt lived in Royal Oak, Michigan, Flint, Michigan, the Washington, D.C. area and Connecticut until 1961, when his father was hired by Boeing and moved to Seattle.

Crowley graduated from Seattle's Nathan Hale High School, winning state honors as an artist, and briefly worked at Boeing as an illustrator. Entering the University of Washington, he became active in local socialist, antiwar, and civil rights campaigns. In 1967, he joined Paul Dorpat's underground newspaper Helix as a cartoonist, writer, and editor. The following year he ran for the Washington State House of Representatives on the Peace & Freedom Party ticket.

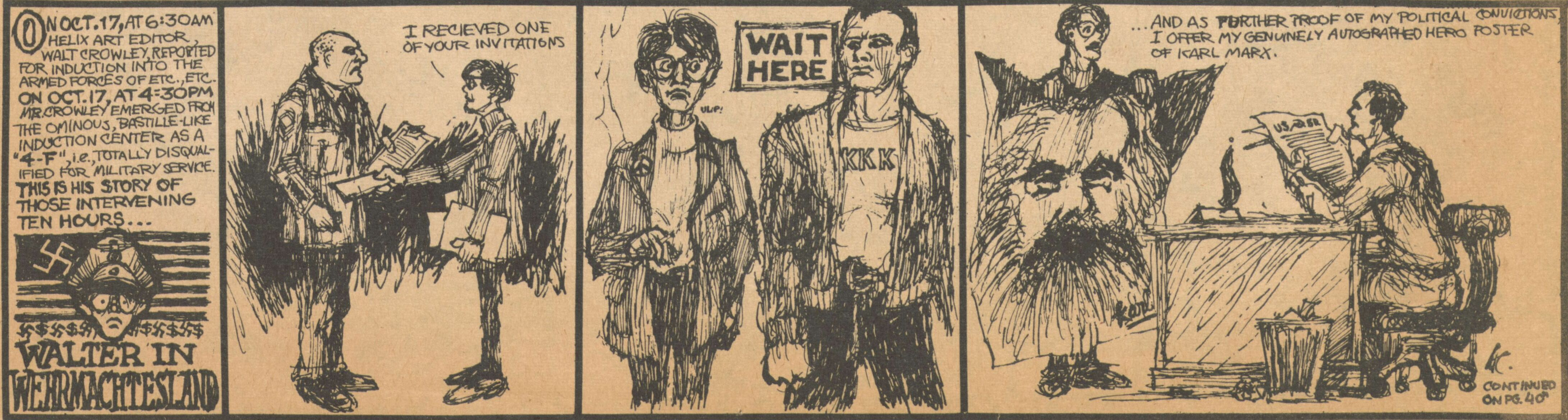
Cartoon strip, probably by Crowley himself, about his appearance before the Draft Board.

Facing possible conscription in 1967, the 20-year-old Crowley described his politics first as "Marxist-Leninist with Trotskyist overtones, flavored with a pinch of Che Guevara, a dash of Carmichael and a tablespoon of Ho Chi Minh," before qualifying that his "political disposition [was] far more eclectic" than a description like that could account for, and ending a somewhat lengthy statement with, "you do not understand my philosophy because when you find out where it's at, it will already have moved."

Crowley's service as mediator between the Seattle officials, local leaders, and the community's street people led to the founding of a youth hostel and social service agency called the U District Center, which Crowley directed from 1970 to 1972. He later worked for the Seattle Model Cities Program and then for the city itself in various planning and outreach roles.

He returned to private industry in 1977 and ran unsuccessfully for the Seattle City Council. He had a variety of civic involvements afterwards, including serving as president of the venerable civic organization Allied Arts.

In 1980, Crowley formed Crowley Associates, which publishes guides to Seattle and provides services for many local political campaigns. He was a columnist and commentator in many local forums, most notably having a seven-year run in a "Point-Counterpoint" format with conservative John Carlson on KIRO television.

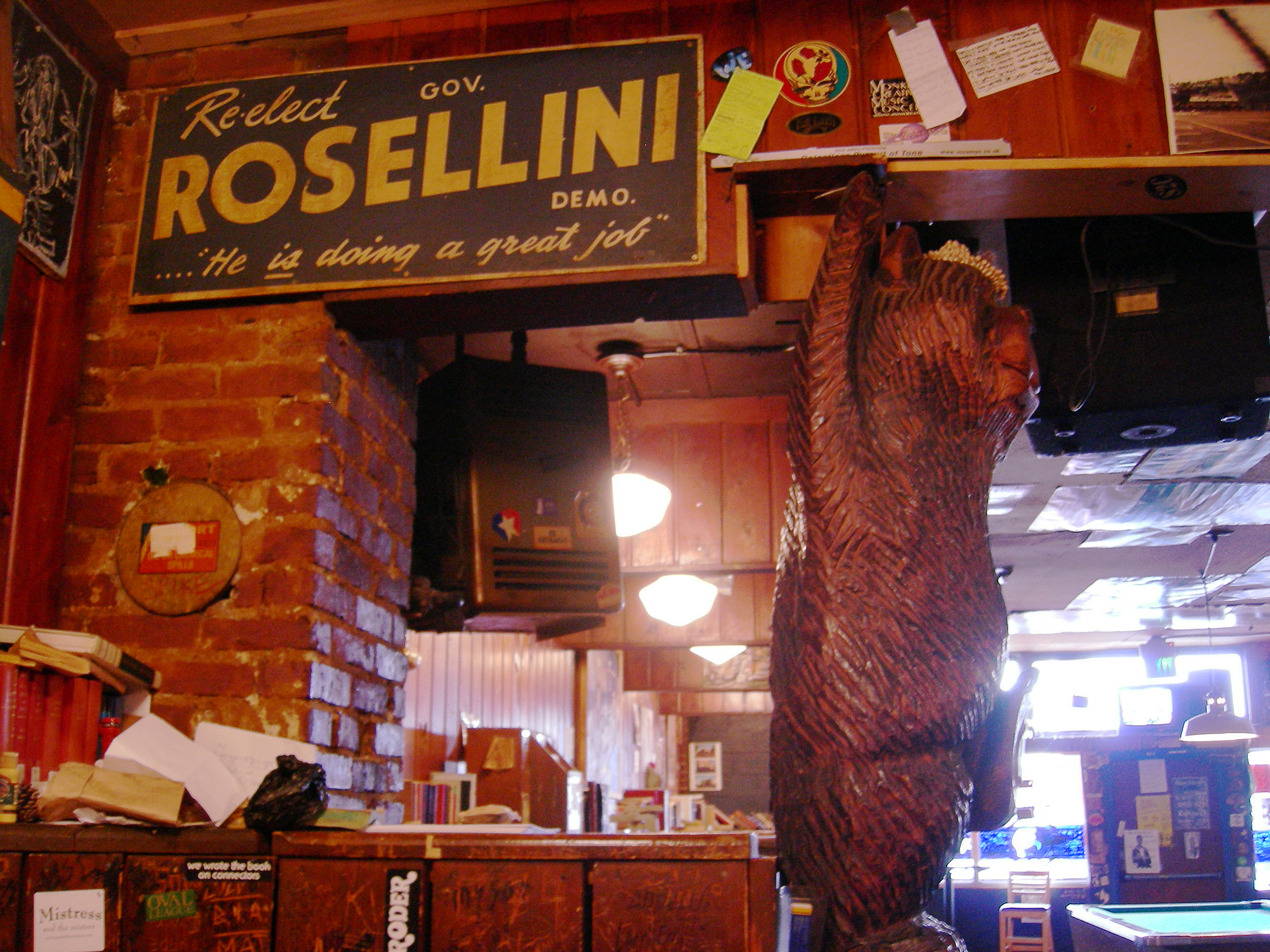
Seattle's Blue Moon Tavern in 2007. The upper-left sign from the 1960s was made in support of liberal Democratic governor Albert Rosellini.

Crowley wrote several histories of local civic institutions, from the elite Rainier Club to the blue-collar Blue Moon Tavern. He led the campaign to save the Blue Moon from demolition, ran the task force that drafted new laws to restore historic Downtown theaters, and served on numerous other civic projects.

== HistoryLink.org ==
In 1997, Crowley discussed preparing a Seattle/King County historical encyclopedia for the 2001 sesquicentennial of the Denny Party. His wife Marie suggested publishing the encyclopedia on the Internet. Alongside Paul Dorpat they incorporated History Ink on November 10, 1997, with seed money from Priscilla "Patsy" Collins, by birth a member of Seattle's wealthy and prominent Bullitt family.

The prototype of HistoryLink.org debuted on May 1, 1998, and attracted additional funding for a formal launch in 1999. In 2003 HistoryLink.org expanded its content to cover Washington state history. Meanwhile, History Ink continues, focusing on the production of history books.

Crowley and HistoryLink.org have won many awards, including

- The Pacific Northwest Historians Guild's 2007 History Award
- The Washington State Historic Preservation Office's award for media in 2001
- The Association of King County Historical Organizations
  - Award for best long-term project (2000)
  - Award for best book (2005) (Alan Stein's history of the Fairmont Olympic Hotel)

== Personal life ==
Walt Crowley married graphic designer and business associate Marie McCaffrey in 1982.

In 2005, Crowley was diagnosed with laryngeal cancer and fought it with characteristic stubbornness; the night before his larynx was removed, he held a "Famous Last (Natural) Words" party. He died at Virginia Mason Hospital in Seattle on September 21, 2007, at the age of 60, after suffering a stroke following an operation for the cancer.

== Bibliography ==
- Helix Drawings 1967-1970 (Seattle: Medium Rare, 1977)
- The Compleat Browser's Guide to Pioneer Square (Seattle: Pioneer Square Association, 1981)
- The Continental Family (Seattle: Continental Mortgage and Savings Bank, 1997)
- Forever Blue Moon: The Story of Seattle's Most (In)Famous Tavern (Seattle: Blue Moon Tavern, 1992)
- Group Health Timeline (Seattle: HistoryLink for Group Health Cooperative, 1997)
- Historic Photos of Seattle (Paducah, Kentucky: Turner Publishing, 2006)
- The National Trust Guide: Seattle (New York: National Trust for Historic Preservation/John Wiley & Sons, 1998)
- The Rainier Club, 1888–1988 (Seattle: Rainier Club, 1988)
- Rites of Passage: A Memoir of the Sixties in Seattle (Seattle: University of Washington Press, 1995)
- Routes: An Interpretative History of Public Transportation in Metropolitan Seattle (Seattle: Metro Transit, 1993)
- The Seattle Aquarium's Guide to Life in the Sea (Seattle: City of Seattle, 1981)
- Seattle & King County Timeline (Seattle: History Ink/University of Washington Press, 2001 & 2002)
- Seattle University: A Century of Jesuit Education (Seattle: Seattle University, 1991)
- The Woodland Park Zoo Guide (Seattle: Woodland Park Zoological Society, 1995)
- To Serve the Greatest Number: A History of Group Health Cooperative of Puget Sound (Seattle: University of Washington Press/Group Health Cooperative, 1996)
- William J. Sullivan, S. J.: Twenty Years (Seattle: Seattle University, 1996)

=== Collaborations ===
- With Heather MacIntosh: The Story of Union Station in Seattle (Seattle: Sound Transit/History Ink, 1999)
- With Kit Oldham: Moving Washington: A Timeline of the Washington State Department of Transportation, 1905-2004 (Seattle: HistoryLink/University of Washington Press, 2005)
- With Robert Courland: The Fairmont: The First Century of a San Francisco Landmark (HistoryLink for Fairmont Hotels & Resorts, 2006)
