= Sky River Rock Festival =

Historic rock festival first held in 1968

Sky River Rock Festival and Lighter Than Air Fair
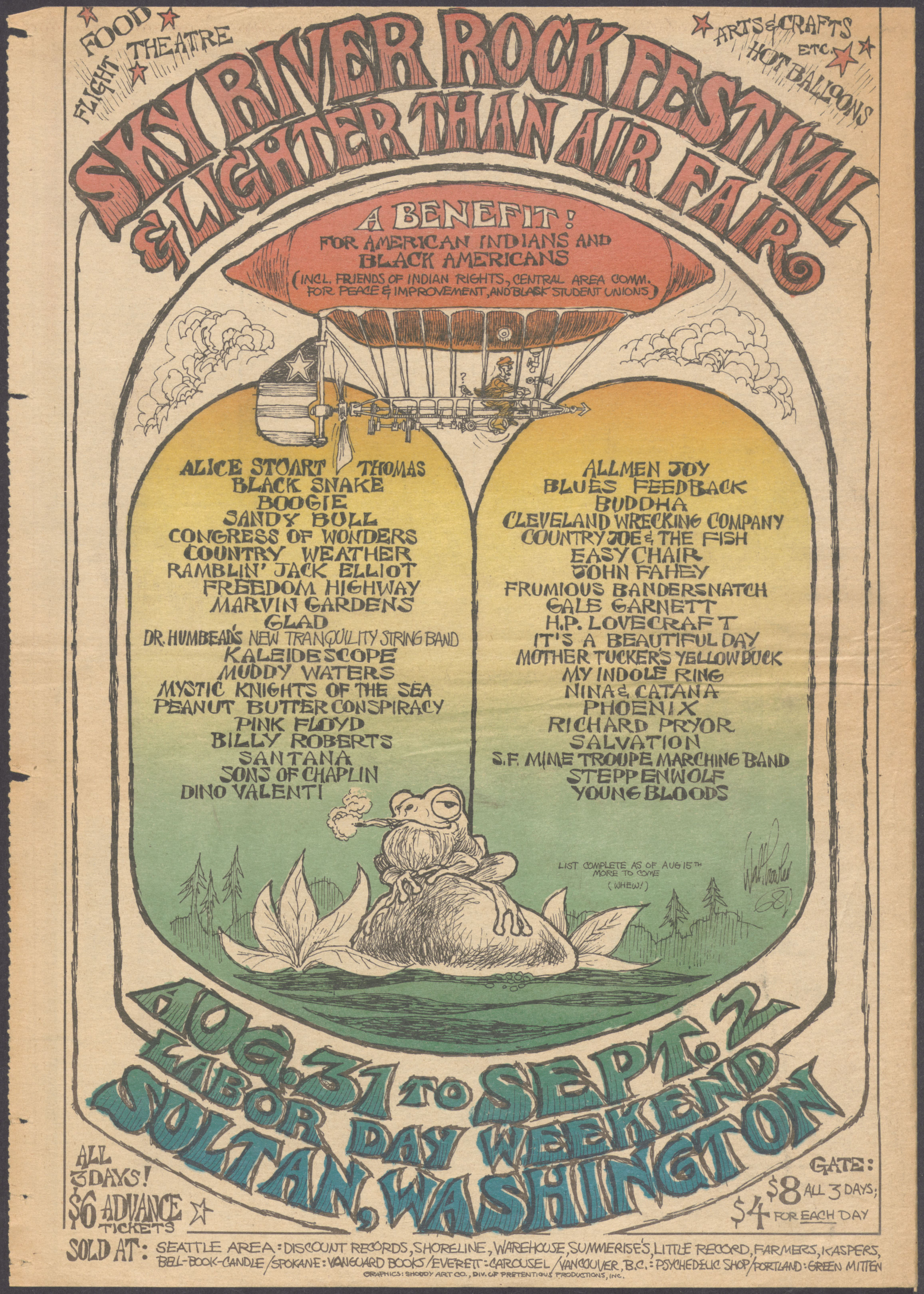
- Ad for the first Sky River Rock Festival
- Genre: Rock, psychedelic rock, blues
- Dates: Labor Day Weekend
- Locations: Skykomish River Sultan, Tenino, Washougal, Washington, United States
- Years active: 1968–1970
- Attendance: unknown
- Capacity: 13,000 (tickets)

The Sky River Rock Festival and Lighter Than Air Fair was a historic American rock festival first held on a raspberry farm on the Skykomish River outside Sultan, Washington, between August 31 and September 2, 1968. It was the first multi-day outdoor hippie rock festival at an undeveloped site. The line-up included bands like the Grateful Dead, Santana, and others. In 1969, the festival was held on Labor Day weekend, August 30 to September 1, in Tenino, Washington. The final festival took place August 28 to September 8, 1970, in Washougal, Washington.

== 1968 ==
On April 28, 1968, approximately 3,000 fans attended a rock concert at a farm in Duvall, Washington, where an upright piano was dropped from a helicopter. Performances included Country Joe and the Fish. This event inspired the Sky River Rock Festival and Lighter Than Air Fair, which occurred later that year.

The first Sky River Rock Festival and Lighter than Air Fair took place from August 28 through September 3, 1968; the town of Sultan, Washington, was visited by approximately 4,000–5,000 young people during the festival. Though the event was ticketed, many people showed up without tickets and snuck in. The promoters claimed to have lost $6,000, although proceeds were to be donated to the Mexican American Federation of Washington, the Foundation for American Indian Rights and the Central Area Peace and Improvement Cooperative. The Camlin Hotel hosted performers for the festival.

Bands and musicians scheduled in the lineup were Santana, Country Joe and the Fish, Richard Pryor, Dino Valente, Freedom Highway, Blues Feedback, Sandy Bull, Cleanliness and Godliness Skiffle Band, John Fahey, Byron Pope Ensemble, H.P. Lovecraft, Pink Floyd (who were on the poster but in Europe at the time and did not play), Country Weather, Easy Chair, Floating Bridge, Steppenwolf, Frumious Bandersnatch, New Lost City Ramblers, It's a Beautiful Day, The Youngbloods, My Indole Ring, Mother Tucker's Yellow Duck, Billy Roberts, Alice Stuart Thomas, Josh White, San Francisco Mime Troupe, Ramblin' Jack Elliot, Juggernaut, Phoenix, Sons of Champlin, Mystic Knights of the Sea, Gale Garnett's band The Gentle Reign (sans Garnett), The Peanut Butter Conspiracy, Marble Farm, The Allman Joys, Black Snake Boogie, Flamin' Groovies, Salvation, and Anonymous Artists of America. The last day, members of the Grateful Dead jammed with James Cotton, Big Mama Thornton, and Billy Roberts.

== 1969 ==
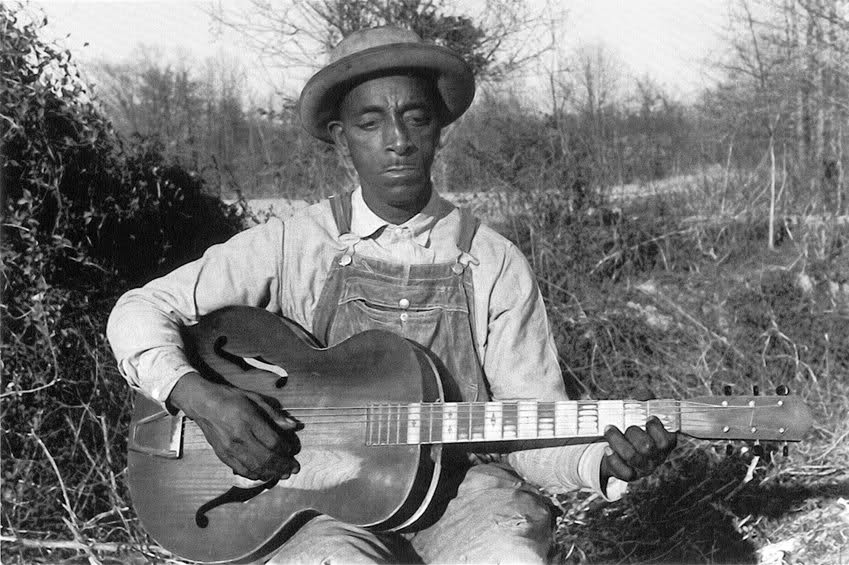
Mississippi Fred McDowell (1960)

The festival was held Labor Day weekend, August 30 and September 1, 1969, in Tenino, Washington. The lineup had James Cotton, Country Joe and the Fish, Flying Burrito Brothers, Buddy Guy, Dan Hicks and His Hot Licks, Dr. Humbead's New Tranquility String Band, Kaleidoscope, Mississippi Fred McDowell, The Steve Miller Band, New Lost City Ramblers, Pacific Gas & Electric, Billy Roberts, Sons of Champlin, Mark Spoelstra, and many others. "Dr. Humbead's New Tranquility String Band and Medicine Show" consisted of Sue Draheim, Jim Bamford, Mac Benford, and Will Spires.

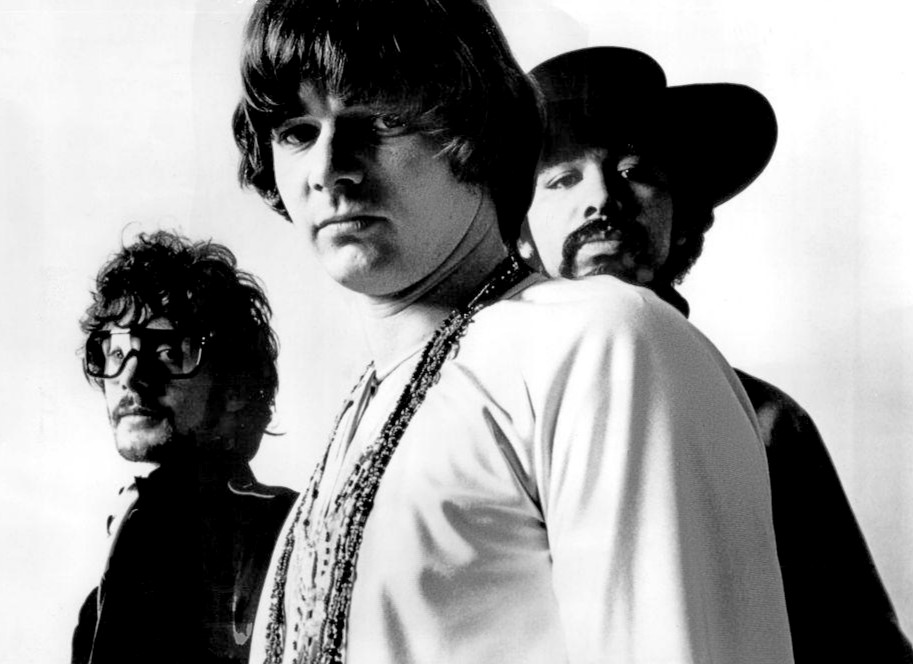
Steve Miller Band (1969)

Most counties in the state of Washington had outlawed rock festivals by 1968, although Governor Dan Evans said, "We can't ban a rock concert, per se." Promotor John Chambless, who otherwise taught philosophy at the University of Washington, first found a site near Enumclaw, which was offered and then taken away, before settling on the Tenino site. A day after the Woodstock festival began, the Sky River II festival began to be noticed. When Woodstock was over, Tenino-area residents held a public meeting to oppose Sky River II. It was billed as the Stop the Rock Festival Committee, meeting on August 21, led by a leader of the local John Birch Society, who claimed they could not allow an event that was the "glorification of communist movements in foreign countries." Landowners and the Tenino Chamber of Commerce filed suit; the suit claimed there would be a noise impact on cows ("…it would cause them to lose flesh. They won’t be grazing.") The local court stepped in to stop the festival; the State Supreme Court overruled them to allow it on the day before it was to open. It was held at the Rainier Hereford Ranch, mostly dry grassland, near Tenino, south of Olympia. The crowd was estimated to be 30,000.

== 1970 ==
Sky River III was held 1970 in Washougal, Washington. It was one of the longest-duration festivals, lasting 10 days from August 28 until September 8, with daily attendance in excess of 10,000 on some days. Over 40 bands were featured on the event posters.

In 1970, the nucleus of the Air Pirates cartoonist collective met at the Sky River Rock Festival. Bay Area residents Ted Richards and Bobby London met Shary Flenniken and Dan O'Neill at the media booth, where Flenniken was producing a daily Sky River newsletter on a mimeograph machine. Before the festival was over, the four of them produced a four-page tabloid comic, Sky River Funnies, mostly drawn by London.

== See also ==
- List of historic rock festivals
- List of jam band music festivals
- In Search of America—1971 film using footage of the festival, produced for ABC Movie of the Week
