= Ted Richards (artist) =

American web designer and cartoonist (1946–2023)

- Born: Theodore Richards; October 20, 1946 Fort Bragg, North Carolina, U.S.
- Died: April 21, 2023 (aged 76)
- Area: Cartoonist
- Notable works: E.Z. Wolf, Mellow Cat, Dopin' Dan, The Forty Year Old Hippie.

Theodore Richards (October 20, 1946 – April 21, 2023) was an American web designer and cartoonist, best known for his underground comix.

== Biography ==
Born in Fort Bragg, North Carolina, Richards developed his fascination for creating cartoons when five years old. His father was in the Green Berets, and assignments kept the family living in different locations.

After serving in the United States Air Force, Richards moved in 1969 to San Francisco when he was 23, (the same year Rip Off Press was launched). He became friends with Gilbert Shelton and contributed to some issues of Shelton's The Fabulous Furry Freak Brothers. Over a decade, he worked full-time as a cartoonist on the titles Dopin' Dan, E.Z. Wolf, and Mellow Cat. Richards recalled, "For me, the whole explosion, and the opportunities that this presented, is hard to describe. You could do about anything. It was an incredible, eclectic vision of art, design, storytelling, writing, color."

Beginning in 1971, Richards was a member of the Air Pirates collective, one of the key contributors to Air Pirates Funnies, an underground comix title that led to a lawsuit by Walt Disney Productions. The nucleus of the Air Pirates collective began to form in 1969–1970 when Bobby London met Richards at the office of the Berkeley Tribe, an underground newspaper where both were staff cartoonists. As a member of the collective, Richards lived together with founder Dan O'Neill, London, Gary Hallgren, and Shary Flenniken in a warehouse on Harrison Street in San Francisco. Richards' Dopin' Dan comics, produced during this period and published by Last Gasp in 1972–1973, imitated the art style (and military theme) of Mort Walker's Beetle Bailey.

The Rip Off Press website details Richards' career in the mid-to-late 1970s:

By 1975 Ted was ensconced in the penthouse studio at Rip Off's south-of-Market facility (1250 17th Street . . .). In addition to his own characters, he was working closely with Gilbert and Willy Murphy . . . on Rip Off Press' entry into the Bicentennial hoopla, Give Me Liberty (this is a quasi-historical comic about the American Revolution . . . ). When the Give Me Liberty project was completed, Ted went to work drawing the adventures of The Forty Year Old Hippie for the Rip Off Comics Syndicate. The strips appeared in dozens of weekly papers across the nation, and struck a responsive chord with aging freaks and ex-freaks. Two comic collections eventually appeared and sold out, with a major hiatus in between the two as a year of Ted's working life went down the tubes while he and fellow Air Pirates defended themselves against a massive lawsuit by Disney Corporation (the suit alleged copyright infringement as Air Pirates Funnies depicted Disney-esque characters having sex and taking illicit drugs).

In 1976, Richards' The Forty Year Old Hippie was published in college newspapers and as a syndicated feature in weekly alternative tabloids. The feature had two collections from Rip Off Press.

In 1977, Richards graduated from San Francisco State University, where he studied philosophy, creative writing, anthropology and industrial design.

As described on the Rip Off Press website, in 1981, "tired of living in poverty, Ted left comix . . . for a high-paying job in the computer division of Atari.

In 1984, Richards returned to comics with the eight-page "The Forty Year Old Hippie Brings the Computer Age Home" for The Computer Deli (Workman Press).

In 1987, Richards founded AdWare, providing software products and design services for computer clients, including Apple and Microsoft. In the 1990s, he became a web site developer, offering enterprise-level development services, consulting, web design and information architecture.

Richards died of lung cancer on April 21, 2023, at the age of 76.
