= The Strategy of the Were-Wolf Dog =

1896 short story by Willa Cather

- Short story by Willa Cather
- Country: United States
- Language: English
- Genre: Short story

Publication
- Published in: Home Monthly
- Publication type: Women's magazine
- Publication date: December 1896

"The Strategy of the Were-Wolf Dog" is a short story by Willa Cather. It was first published in Home Monthly in December 1896.

== Plot summary ==
The day before Santa Claus goes off to distribute presents to children around the world, the White Bear says he suspects the Were-Wolf Dog to be around, but Santa tells him not to stay up as he will need energy for the following day. During the night, the Were-Wolf lures the reindeers into coming out of their stable to see the stars by the sea. There, he tricks them into walking on ice floes which go down, and they all die but Dunder. The latter runs to White Bear's to inform him of what happened. The two characters go to the ice hummock to ask the other animals if they can help them carry the presents tomorrow as they have no reindeers left. Only a seal agrees, but it is too old and slow to do the job. The reindeers finally relent.

== Characters ==
- Santa Claus
- Mama Santa
- White Bear
- Were-Wolf Dog
- Dunder, a reindeer, the only one to survive.
- Cupid, a reindeer.
- Blitzen, a reindeer.
- Dasher, a reindeer.
- Prancer, a reindeer.
- Vixen, a reindeer.

== Major themes ==
- Christmas

== Literary significance and criticism ==
In a letter to Mildred R. Bennett, Elsie Cather, Willa's youngest sister, admitted that the story was one made up by Willa and her brothers Roscoe and Douglas to entertain the younger children on family gatherings.

== Adaptations ==
The story was adapted by Tom Pomplun for Christmas Classics: Graphic Classics Volume Nineteen (2010).
