= Shary Flenniken =

American cartoonist

- Born: 1950 (age 75–76) Norfolk, Virginia, US
- Areas: Cartoonist, Writer, Penciller, Editor
- Notable works: Trots and Bonnie
- Awards: Inkpot Award (1980)
- Spouses: Bobby London (div.; m. c. 1972–1976); Bruce Jay Paskow (1987–1995; his death)

Shary Flenniken (born 1950) is an American editor-writer-illustrator and underground cartoonist. After joining the burgeoning underground comics movement in the early 1970s, she became a prominent contributor to National Lampoon and was one of the editors of the magazine for two years.

Flenniken is widely recognized as an influential figure in the integration of feminist concerns into underground comics. Her best-known creation is the comic strip Trots and Bonnie, a no-holds-barred satire of the adult world seen through the eyes of the naïve girl of the title and her talking dog (and their worldly-wise, precocious friend Pepsi); these three main characters are all sex-obsessed, and the two girls are in eighth grade, i.e. the final year of Junior High. Available in a 1989 French edition entitled Sexe & Amour for many years, an American edition was not released until 2021; it provides much cultural context. Despite the sometimes raunchy subject matter, it is illustrated in the vein of early comic strip artists like Clare Briggs and H. T. Webster.

== Biography ==
Shary Flenniken grew up in Alaska, Panama, and Seattle, where she studied at a commercial art school.

=== Air Pirates ===
In 1970, Flenniken was living in Seattle. In late summer that year she attended the Sky River Rock Festival, producing a daily Sky River newsletter on a mimeograph machine. She met Bobby London, Dan O'Neill, and Ted Richards at the media booth, and before the festival was over the four of them produced a four-page tabloid comic, Sky River Funnies, mostly drawn by London. After the festival, Flenniken returned to Seattle where she did graphics for the Seattle Liberation Front's brief-lived underground newspaper, Sabot.

She moved to San Francisco in 1971, where she joined the Air Pirates collective. Flenniken was a marginal contributor to the Air Pirates, and the only member not to be sued for their Disney parodies.

=== National Lampoon ===
Flenniken and London were recruited by Michel Choquette, an editor of National Lampoon, where Flenniken's Trots and Bonnie appeared from 1972 to 1990.

Flenniken was an editor of National Lampoon from 1979 to 1981, recruited many of the magazine's best-known cartoonists during that time, and co-wrote the screenplay of National Lampoon Goes to the Movies.

=== Other work ===
Flenniken edited Seattle Laughs: Comic Stories about Seattle (Homestead, 1994), and she continues to freelance from Seattle. In addition to contributions to DC Comics' Paradox Press anthologies, her work has appeared in Mad, Premiere, Details, The American Lawyer and other magazines. In recent years she contributed to the Graphic Classics series, praised by School Library Journal and Publishers Weekly for its adaptations of Mark Twain, O. Henry and other authors.

== Personal life ==
Flenniken and Air Pirates co-founder Bobby London were married in the early-to-mid 1970s.

Her second marriage was with the late Bruce Jay Paskow of the band Washington Squares. After the couple wed in 1987, they moved two years later from Manhattan to Seattle, where they were together for six years until Paskow's death in 1995.

== Books ==
- Drought Chic (self-published, 1977)
- Shary Flenniken's Sketch Book (self-published, 1977)
- Sexe & Amour (éd. Spécial USA, 1989) — French edition
- Trots and Bonnie (S.I. Comics, 1990) ISBN 9782876951327 — French edition
- Seattle Laughs: Comic Stories about Seattle (Homestead Book Co., 1994)
- Trots and Bonnie (New York Review Comics, 2021) ISBN 9781681374857

Illustrations in books by others:

- Nice Guys Sleep Alone: Dating in the Difficult Eighties (Dell, 1986) — written by Bruce Feirstein
- Eastside Eats: Including Bellevue, Kirkland, & Redmond (Homestead Book Co., 1988) — written by Kim & Sunny Baker
- How to Live Without Electricity—and Like It (Breakout Productions, 1997) — written by Anita Evangelista
- When a Man Loves a Walnut (Simon & Schuster, 1997) — written by Gavin Edwards
- Blood-Lust Chickens and Renegade Sheep: A First Timer's Guide to Country Living (Loompanics Unlimited, 1999) — written by Nick & Anita Evangelista
- Graphic Classics: O. Henry (Eureka Productions, 2005)
- Graphic Classics: Mark Twain (Eureka Productions, 2007)
