= The Collective Unconscience of Odd Bodkins =

1973 comic collection by Dan O'Neill

- Author: Dan O'Neill
- Illustrator: Dan O'Neill
- Language: English
- Genre: Comics
- Publisher: Glide
- Publication date: 1973
- Publication place: United States
- Media type: Print (softcover)
- Pages: 112 pp
- ISBN: 0912078332

The Collective Unconscience of Odd Bodkins is a 1973 collection of the newspaper comic strip Odd Bodkins by American cartoonist Dan O'Neill. The strips contained in the book were originally syndicated by the San Francisco Chronicle between 1969 and 1970, when the strip was terminated.

== Description ==
Odd Bodkins was highly philosophical in tone, and the book contains the strip's most idiosyncratic storylines. As an example of Odd Bodkins' content, a large part of the collection is an extended sequence in which the protagonists Fred and Hugh discover that the world is being terraformed by the brass horseman General Injuns in preparation for a Martian invasion. After revealing their knowledge, they are pursued by the General and various other characters symbolizing The Establishment, fleeing on Hugh's intelligent Norton motorcycle. They then encounter the ghost of Abraham Lincoln, referred to in the strip as Five Dollar Bill O'Brady, who reveals that Martians orchestrated his assassination.

The group gives Norton the motorcycle a 'magic cookie' (an occasional plot device in the strip, probably symbolizing LSD) which allows the vehicle to leave Earth's orbit. After crash-landing on Mars, Fred, Hugh and Bill are hypnotized and lectured on political theory by the Martians, which Fred eventually rejects. They are then placed in a giant hourglass and die, landing in Hell, which is controlled by a caricature of Mickey Mouse named Virgo the Rat. They eventually escape after suffering such torments as eating tapioca for 10,000 years and being tormented by giant floating cat heads.

== Sources ==
- O'Neill, Dan. The Collective Unconscience of Odd Bodkins. (Glide Publications, 1973). (ISBN 0912078332)
