= Upstart Associates =

Artists' studio in New York City (1978-mid-1980s)

- Trade name: Upstart Studios
- Type: Comics studio
- Founded: 1978; 48 years ago
- Founders: Howard Chaykin, Walt Simonson, Jim Starlin, Val Mayerik
- Defunct: c. 1989
- Headquarters: 231 West 29th Street, New York City, United States
- Key people: Peter Kuper, Dean Haspiel
- Members: Howard Chaykin; Walt Simonson; Jim Starlin; Val Mayerik; James Sherman; Frank Miller; Gary Hallgren

Upstart Associates, sometimes known as Upstart Studios, was the name of an artists' studio at 231 West 29th Street in New York City formed in late 1978 by four comic book creators. Those artists were Howard Chaykin, Walt Simonson, Val Mayerik, and Jim Starlin. The membership of the studio changed over time, eventually adding James Sherman, Frank Miller, and Gary Hallgren as previous members left. (There were never more than four studio members at any one time.) In addition, future comics professionals Peter Kuper and Dean Haspiel worked as assistants at Upstart before they began doing professional work.

Early 1980s comics produced at Upstart include including Chaykin's American Flagg!, Simonson's run on Thor, and Miller's run on Daredevil. In addition, while at Upstart, Chaykin and Simonson created a series of humorous one-pagers for Heavy Metal magazine called Shakespeare for Americans.

Upstart disbanded in the late 1980s.

== History ==
Chaykin and Simonson had known each other since the early 1970s, at one point living in the same Queens apartment building (along with Allen Milgrom and Bernie Wrightson.) The two friends, along with Mayerik and Starlin, rented the 1000-square foot studio near the beginning of the fall of 1978; the name "Upstart" was suggested by either Chaykin's wife or Starlin.

Peter Kuper, still in art school at the time, worked at Upstart as Chaykin's assistant on various projects from 1979 to 1981.

Mayerik left New York in 1980 (moving to Ohio); he was replaced at Upstart by James Sherman. (According to Simonson, he and Chaykin knew Sherman from their shared past association with Neal Adams' Continuity Studios.) Shortly afterward, Starlin left the city to move upstate; his space was taken by Frank Miller.

Chaykin and Simonson produced nine Shakespeare for Americans strips for Heavy Metal over the period of October 1981 to September 1982. Miller illustrated the final strip for Upstart, which was written by Simonson, for the September 1982 issue. Chaykin's former assistant Peter Kuper created a Shakespeare for American strip for Heavy Metal's July 1982 issue.

The membership stayed stable until 1984, when Miller left.

In the mid-1980s, while still in high school and shortly thereafter, Dean Haspiel worked at Upstart as an assistant for Chaykin on American Flagg! and for Simonson on Thor. (He had earlier worked as an assistant at a neighboring studio on the same floor for Bill Sienkiewicz on New Mutants and Elektra: Assassin.)

The studio was visited at various times by a number of other comics professionals as well as those who would later work in the industry, including Arthur Adams, Kyle Baker, Bret Blevins, Richard Case, Denys Cowan, Michael Davis, Peter B. Gillis, Joe Chiodo, Jackson Guice, Joe Jusko, José Marzan Jr., Mike Mignola, Josh Neufeld, Peter Sanderson, David Scroggy, Bill Sienkiewicz, Dwayne Turner, Lynn Varley, and Bill Wray.

Howard Chaykin left for the West Coast in late 1985. The two remaining members, Simonson and Sherman, then brought in Gary Hallgren. Simonson left Upstart in 1987. Hallgren stayed for a while longer and then moved his studio to Long Island. Sherman stayed on, using more of the space for larger projects. He eventually converted the space into a residence, thus officially drawing the Upstart Associates era to a close.

As of 2003, Sherman still occupied the space.

== Studio environment ==
Simonson characterized the studio environment as "a cool place to be":

We were all sort of competitive. . . . It was inspiring to see Daredevil coming along,. It was inspiring to see American Flagg! getting done. . . . Mainly it was getting to see other guys at work. If you had problems, you could talk 'em over with them. . . . Being part of a studio means that . . . you get to interact with other creative people. That can fire your juices up.

Sherman described the studio environment as:

Really down to business. It was funny. Somebody interviewed us and we said, 'Well, the atmosphere is we hardly ever talk, nobody plays music, 'cause nobody wants to interfere with anybody.' . . . Everybody was just too busy getting their job done. . . . You're . . . trying to put all the pieces together to make the story work, so you're just too busy to talk.

Peter Kuper discussed his experiences at Upstart as "an important learning experience":

I needed to get my technical chops together and working for Chaykin at Upstart Studio was a pressure-cooker chance to do that. . . . I got to see working artists, and Howard was super workaholic, so I learned that when I got out of school, it wasn't like, 'Now I can relax.' I discovered that working for myself meant working at a higher velocity than school. That was really great, because there were no surprises of what being a working cartoonist was about.

Similarly, Dean Haspiel described his tenure as an assistant at Upstart as "a year-long crash course that expanded my comix making tools exponentially and became an experience I will forever cherish."

== See also ==
- The Studio

== Sources ==
- Upstart Studios at Who's Who of American Comic Books: 1928–1999
