= Milton Knight =

American cartoonist and animator (born 1962)

- Born: May 12, 1962 (age 64) Mineola, New York, U.S.
- Area: Cartoonist
- Pseudonym: Lou Hepton
- Notable works: Hugo; Mighty Mouse; Adventures of Sonic the Hedgehog

Milton Knight Jr. (born May 12, 1962) is an American cartoonist, animator, comic book artist, writer, painter, and storyboard/layout artist. He directed animation for a variety of cartoon series, including Cool World, Adventures of Sonic the Hedgehog, and The Twisted Tales of Felix the Cat. He is known for his Golden Age (1930s) cartooning style.

Gary Groth described Knight as "clearly a maladjusted oddball, but it was precisely because of this [Groth] liked him."

== Biography ==
=== Early life ===
On May 12, 1962, Milton Knight Jr. was born in Mineola, New York. At age two, Knight began to draw, paint, and create comic books and animation. Knight collected Chinese watercolors, poster art, Charlie Brown comics, and Terrytoons, all of which inspired his own works. When visiting New York museums and galleries as a child, Knight was captivated by pop artists' combination of comic strips and fine art.

Regardless of his medium, Knight's interest in art creation is "not in recapturing or approximating reality, but in creating new forms and abstractions and giving them their own unique life."

=== Illustrator ===
From 1979 on, he illustrated for national magazines and newspapers: The Village Voice, Family Weekly, Nickelodeon Magazine, The Electric Company Magazine, National Lampoon, High Times, Heavy Metal, and others.

He has designed comic books, record covers, posters, candy, and T-shirts.

=== Comics ===
Circa 1982, Mike Harris, who was familiar with Milton Knight's comic Hugo, connected Knight with Kim Thompson and Gary Groth of graphic novel publisher Fantagraphics. In 1982, they published Hugo, Knight's one-shot billed as "fairy tales for adults." Thompson described it as a "pretty dark, bleak, and frankly misogynistic view of life...poured [into] a funny-animal comic...quite fascinating." Fantagraphics brought the title back as a three-issue series in 1984–85, and later collected it as a trade paperback.

Knight also wrote and drew the ten-issue Marvel Comics series Mighty Mouse, a spin-off of the Ralph Bakshi project The New Adventures, from 1990 to 1991.

=== Animation ===
Knight moved to California in 1991, where he became an animator for TV cartoons, specifically by breaking in as a director on The Twisted Tales of Felix the Cat. He developed the art, character, props, background, storyboard, and color designs of animated cartoons for Disney TV, MGM TV, Saban, Rhythm & Hues, Warner Bros. Animation, HBO, and others; notable titles included Ralph Bakshi's Cool World, Adventures of Sonic the Hedgehog, and The Twisted Tales of Felix the Cat.

Knight teaches art at The Colonnade Art Gallery and Studio in Pasadena, California. He is an animation archive volunteer for the International Animated Film Association.

In 2021, CBR announced that Knight would provide commentary for the Blu-ray release of Adventures of Sonic the Hedgehog, which provided all 65 episodes. The compilation was released in February 2022 featuring Knight's commentary.

=== Hate crime incident ===
On February 25, 2019, Knight reported on his Facebook account that he had been a victim of a hate crime on the same day. He recounted that a man provoked Knight with racial slurs and then repeatedly punched him in the head when Knight confronted him, resulting in injuries that required hospitalization to both parties. Knight stated that he had pressed charges against his assailant for assault and battery and the assailant was jailed for the incident.

== Bibliography ==
=== Animation ===
- Cool World (Ralph Bakshi/Paramount, 1992) — character designer, layout, animation
- Battletoads (TV movie, 1992) — storyboard/layout artist
- Adventures of Sonic the Hedgehog (DIC Entertainment, 1993) — story, storyboard artist character, background & prop design, layout, animation.
- The Twisted Tales of Felix the Cat (Film Roman, 1995) — directed four shorts, co-writer
- The Mouse and the Monster (Saban, 1996) — storyboard artist, etc.
- Safety spot for the California Department of Water Resources (Baer Animation) — director, animator
- Johnny Test (2005) — storyboard artist - "The Return of Johnny X"
- Class of 3000 (2006) — storyboard artist
- Attila and the Great Blue Bean (2007) — illustrations
- Caprice! - independent cartoon planned, not made
- Popeye "Barbecue for Two" - animator on a Reanimate Collab of the 1960 original (2023)

=== Comics ===
- Teenage Mutant Ninja Turtles (Murakami-Wolf-Swenson, 1990)
- Betty Boop's Big Break
- Graphic Classics (Eureka Productions, 2001–2016) — paperback series; H.G. Wells, Edgar Allan Poe, and Arthur Conan Doyle adaptations
- Harveyville Fun Times!
- The Graphic Canon (Seven Stories Press) — "Poker!" (Zora Neale Hurston adaptation)
- Molasses (Syrup Pirates, 2014 - 2015) - "Blackbird Pie", "Adolph"
- Public Domain Funnies Comics No. 1 (2026) - cover artist, adapation of Plane Crazy

==== Eurotic/Adult comics ====
- Hugo (Fantagraphics Books, 1982, 1984–1985) — first published comics work
- Screw strips, including "Wolfo"
- Heavy Metal strips (1980s)
- Mack
- Midnite the Rebel Skunk (1986–1987)
- Moonie (Moonchild) (MU Press)
- Nanny Dickering
- Slug 'n' Ginger — under the pen name Lou Hepton (1982–present)
- Wild Kingdom (Mu Press)
- Zoe (in High Times)
- Hinkley (MU Press)
- World War 3 Illustrated

=== Music album covers ===
- Sheiks and Vamps 1920's Dance Bands Vol. 1
- Laughter from the Hip (1989)
- The Definitive Fats Waller, Vol. 2: Hallelujah (1991)
- The Raymond Scott Project, Volume 1: Powerhouse (Stash Records, 1992)
- Halloween Stomp: Haunted House Party (Jass Records, 1993)
- Que Rico! Mozambique (Esrico Music, 1996) — Ricardo Estrada
- Viper Mad Blues: Songs Of Dope & Depravity (Mojo Records, 1996)
- Sissy Man Blues (Mojo Records, 1999)
