= Brad Teare =

Brad Teare working on Summer Cottonwoods

Brad Teare (born 1956) is an American artist and illustrator. He has worked in woodcuts and as a Western landscape artist in oils.

== Early life and education ==
Teare was born in Moscow, Idaho, and raised in Manhattan, Kansas. While in high school, he was the drummer in a rock band. In summer 1975, he moved to forested land owned by his brother in northern Idaho, where he built a cabin with a friend, then helped construct the Pacific Crest Trail in the Alpine Lakes Wilderness Area in Washington. He subsequently studied illustration at the University of Idaho and Utah State University.

== Career ==
He worked in cartoon animation and moved to New York City, where he freelanced as an illustrator for The New York Times and provided the art for several book covers for Random House. In 1992, he created a comic book, Cypher, which was serialized in Heavy Metal and published in 1997 as a graphic novel. A spin-off comic, The Subterranean, appeared online in 2013.

Teare used scratchboard for The Subterranean and woodcuts for many of his book covers. Having moved to the Hudson Valley, he began to focus more on landscapes, and influenced especially by Van Gogh, turned away from woodcuts to painting in oils with heavy impasto, ultimately with a palette knife instead of a brush.

In 1994, he moved to Providence, Utah, where he focused on painting Western landscapes. He discontinued freelance work in 2001. In 2006, two of his works, Color of the Land and the woodblock print Rock Moss, won awards from the Deseret Morning News. He has been an artist-in-residence at the Maynard Dixon residence in 2004 and at Christopher Forbes' Trinchera Ranch in 2006, received the third place award at the 2021 juried exhibition of the American Impressionist Society, and had work included in the annual Quest for the West exhibition at the Eiteljorg Museum of American Indians and Western Art.

His later work as an illustrator includes a 1997 children's book in verse by Rick Walton, Dance, Pioneer, Dance!, and illustrations for The Friend, children's magazine of the LDS Church, where he became senior designer. He has taught continuing education painting workshops at Weber State University and posts instructional videos on his YouTube channel.

== Personal life ==
Teare was married to trompe-l'œil artist Debra Teare, who died in 2018, and has a daughter.
