= Blue Moon Tavern =

Tavern in Seattle, Washington

Coordinates: 47.6615°N 122.32°W

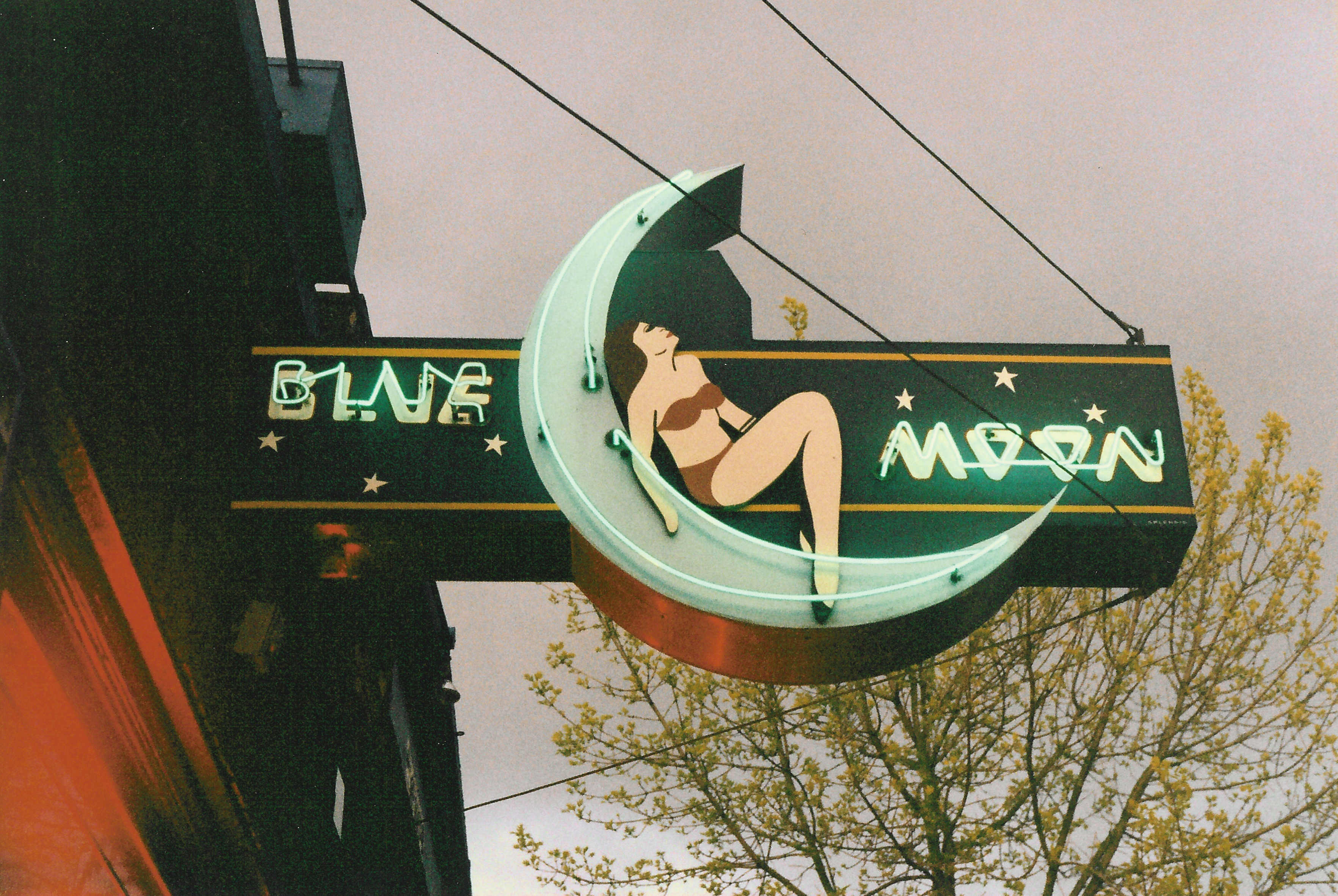
- Main sign of the Blue Moon Tavern in 1993
- Type: Private
- Industry: Food and beverage
- Founded: April 1934
- Headquarters: Seattle, Washington, U.S.
- Area served: University District
- Website: www.thebluemoonseattle.com

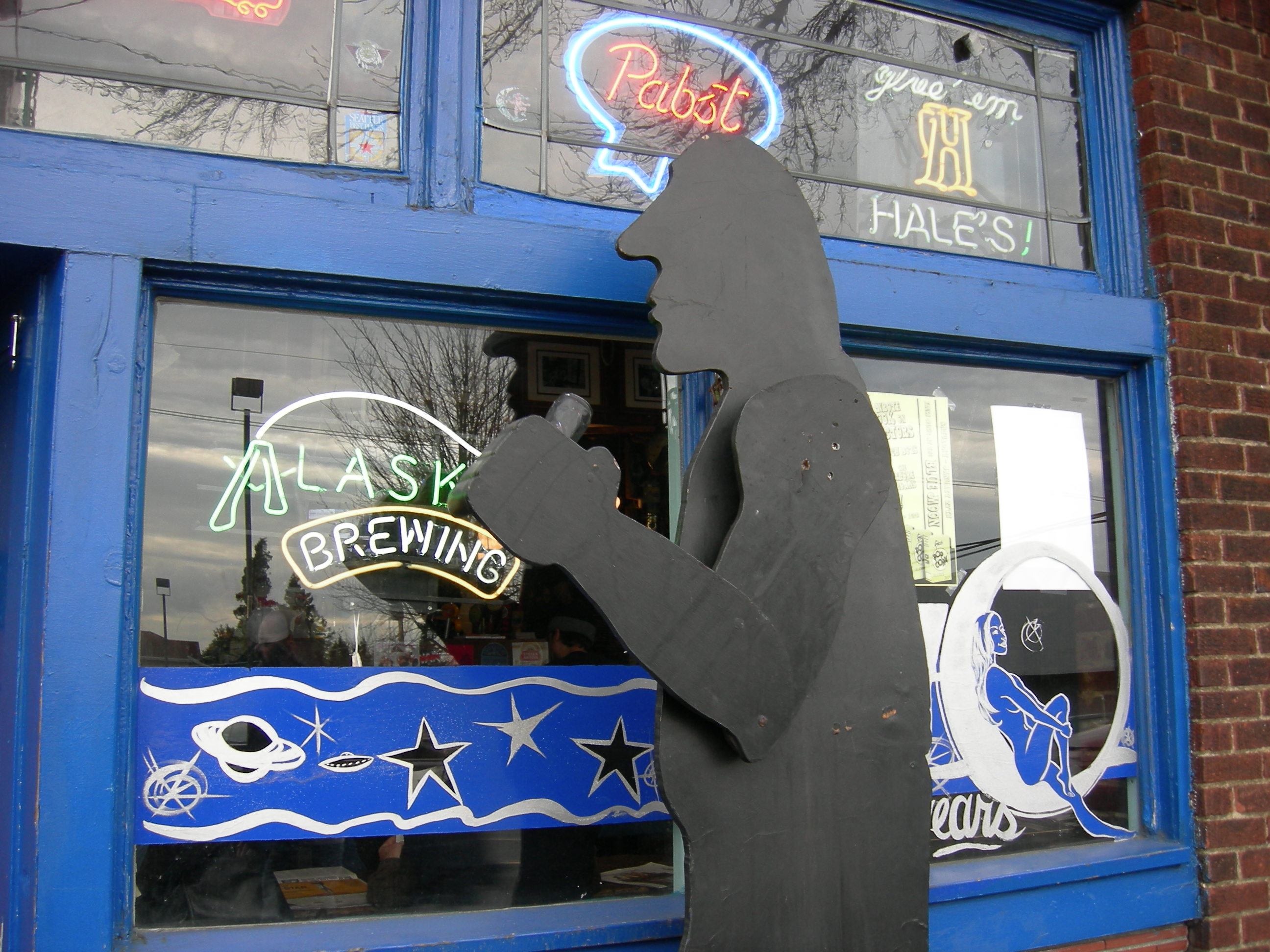
The "Hammered Man" sculpture in front of the Blue Moon, a parody of "Hammering Man"

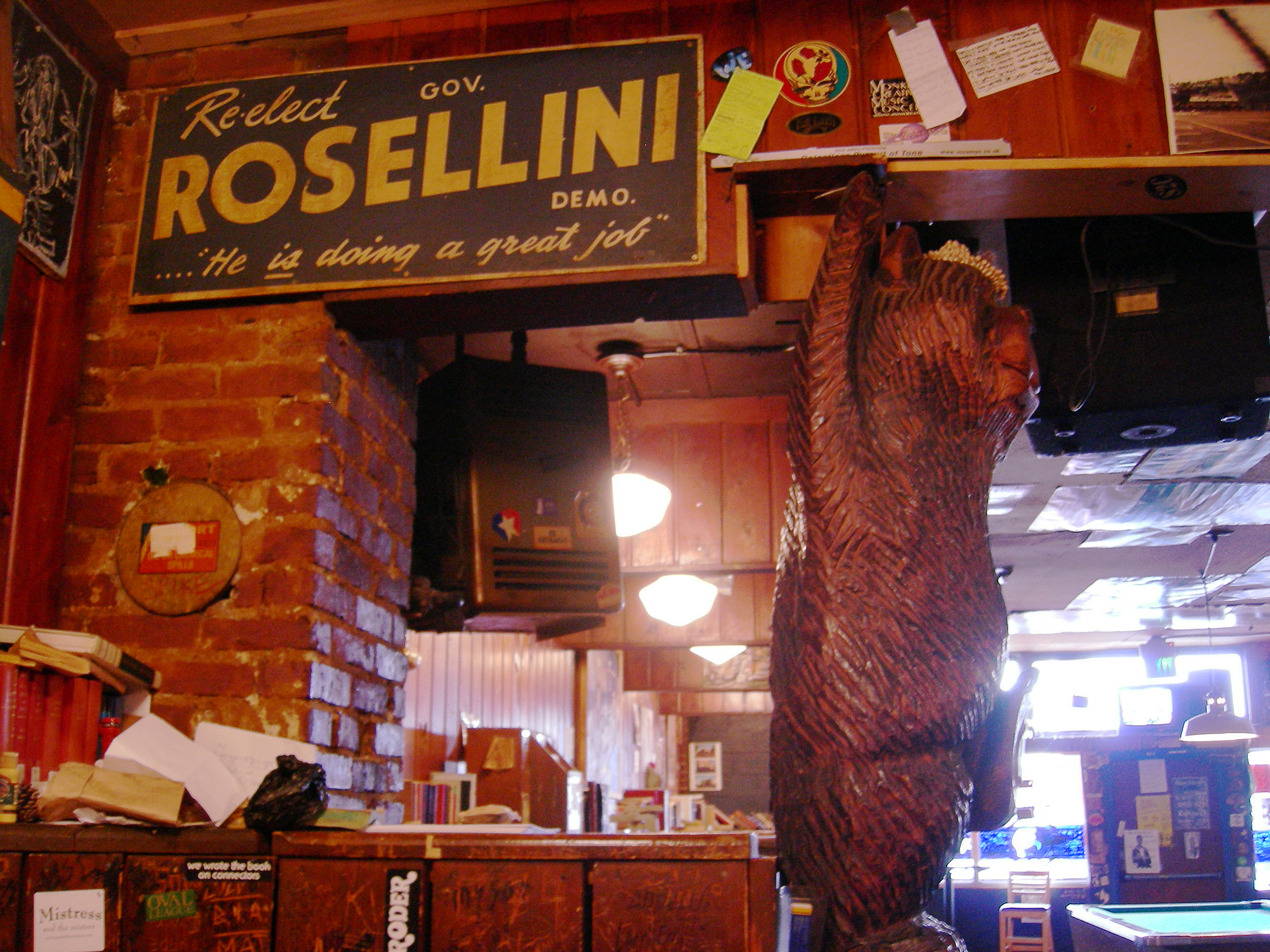
A poster for Albert Rosellini's successful 1960 re-election campaign on display inside the Blue Moon

The Blue Moon is a tavern located on the west edge of the University District in Seattle, Washington, United States.

== History ==
The tavern provided a haven for UW professors who were caught up in the McCarthyist purge, such as Joe Butterworth, who used the bar as his writing desk. Its heyday continued into the 1950s and 1960s.

History: founders story

The Blue Moon Tavern opened in April 1934 with the original owner Henry "Hank" John Reverman in Seattle, Washington. After much convincing Hank was able to utilize his college fund to open a bar at the age of twenty one.

Upon completion of the prohibition era, the Blue Moon Tavern was one of the first bars that forcefully crossed racial barriers and has remained successful over the years. Hank owned the bar for a few years and soon left for the military where he became a pilot.

A popular story claims that sometime in the late 1960s, Tom Robbins tried to call the artist Pablo Picasso in Barcelona from a pay phone at the Blue Moon Tavern. Supposedly, Robbins got through to Picasso, but the artist refused to accept the overseas collect calling charges.

The Blue Moon declined in the 1970s. Efforts to "redevelop" the property in 1989 were derailed by community activists led by Walt Crowley; however, an attempt in 1990 to gain landmark status failed. Developers spared the tavern after landmark status was denied. The Blue Moon remains one of the few surviving blue-collar landmarks in Seattle.

In 1995, the alley to the west of the Blue Moon was named Roethke Mews in honor of the bar's famous patron Theodore Roethke. The business has been described as a dive bar.

The venue commemorated its 90th anniversary in 2024.

== See also ==
- List of dive bars
- Public house
- University District
