= Air Pirates =

American cartoonist group

- Named after: Mickey Mouse antagonists of the 1930s
- Formation: 1971; 55 years ago
- Founder: Dan O'Neill
- Founded at: San Francisco, California, U.S.A.
- Dissolved: 1980; 46 years ago
- Purpose: to parody old-time comic strips and The Walt Disney Company
- Products: Air Pirates Funnies comic books
- Key people: Bobby London, Gary Hallgren, Ted Richards, Shary Flenniken
- Subsidiaries: Mouse Liberation Front

The Air Pirates were a group of cartoonists who created two issues of an underground comic called Air Pirates Funnies in 1971, leading to a famous lawsuit by Walt Disney Productions. Founded by Dan O'Neill, the group also included Bobby London, Shary Flenniken, Gary Hallgren, and Ted Richards.

The original Air Pirates were a gang of Mickey Mouse antagonists of the 1930s; Dan O'Neill imagined Mickey Mouse to be a symbol of conformist hypocrisy in American culture, and therefore a ripe target for satire.

== Overview ==
The lead stories in both issues of Air Pirates Funnies (published by Last Gasp in July & August 1971), created by O'Neill, London, and Hallgren, focused on Walt Disney characters, most notably from Floyd Gottfredson's Mickey Mouse newspaper strip, with the Disney characters engaging in adult behaviors such as sex and recreational drug use. O'Neill insisted that the group did not dilute the parody by changing the names of the characters, so his adventurous mouse character was called "Mickey".

Ted Richards took on the Big Bad Wolf and the Three Little Pigs, opening up a second wave of parody attacking Disney's appropriation of European (and American) folklore. In doing so, they infringed Disney's copyrights by using without permission characters the company had created. On October 21, 1971, Disney filed a lawsuit against O'Neill, Hallgren, London and Richards (Flenniken had not contributed to the parody stories).

== Air Pirates collective history ==
The nucleus of the Air Pirates collective began to form in late 1969-early 1970, when London met Richards at the office of the Berkeley Tribe, an underground newspaper where both were staff cartoonists. (London later drew a highly fictionalized account of their experiences at the Tribe in his story "Why Bobby Seale is Not Black" in the Air Pirates' comic Merton of the Movement.) In 1970 London and Richards attended the Sky River Rock Festival near Portland, Oregon, and met Flenniken and O'Neill at the media booth, where Flenniken was producing a daily Sky River newsletter on a mimeograph machine. Before the festival was over the four of them produced a four-page tabloid comic, Sky River Funnies, mostly drawn by London. O'Neill also met Seattle-based cartoonist Gary Hallgren at the festival.

Meanwhile, O'Neill, who was producing the strip Odd Bodkins for the San Francisco Chronicle, but was fearful of losing his copyright over it, decided on an odd tactic to regain control of his strip: he would engage in copyright infringement, which he reasoned would force the newspaper to surrender the strip's copyright back to him for fear of being sued. O'Neill worked 28 Walt Disney characters, including Mickey Mouse and Pluto, into the strip. In late November 1970, the Chronicle fired O'Neill for the final time and discontinued the strip.

After the Sky River Rock Festival, Flenniken, Richards, and Hallgren returned to Seattle, where Flenniken created graphics for the Seattle Liberation Front's brief-lived underground newspaper, Sabot. London went back to San Francisco with O'Neil and started working with him, contributing a "basement" strip to Odd Bodkins.

In early 1971 O'Neill invited Flenniken, Richards, and Hallgren to San Francisco to form the Air Pirates collective. The Air Pirates lived together in a warehouse on Harrison Street in San Francisco, where London and Flenniken began a relationship that turned into a short-lived marriage.

Each of the cartoonists shared a common interest in the styles of past masters of the comic strip, and – unrelated to their assault on Disney – in creating their stories for Air Pirates projects each set out to imitate the style of an old-time cartoonist:

- Shary Flenniken's Trots and Bonnie imitated Clare Briggs and H. T. Webster
- Gary Hallgren's Pollyanna Pals imitated Cliff Sterrett's Polly and Her Pals
- Bobby London's Dirty Duck imitated George Herriman's Krazy Kat
- Ted Richards' Dopin' Dan imitated Mort Walker's Beetle Bailey

After the Pirates were established, Willy Murphy, Larry Todd and Gary King started hanging around the collective and contributing to their projects, missing the original Air Pirates Funnies but appearing in later Air Pirates comics.

== Disney lawsuit ==
Accurately telling the story of Disney's lawsuit against the Air Pirates is difficult, due to the conflicting memories of the litigants; however, it is fair to say that all through the lawsuit, O'Neill was defiant. He was so eager to be sued by Disney that he had copies of Air Pirates Funnies smuggled into a Disney board meeting by the son of a board member. On October 21, 1971, he got his wish as Disney filed a lawsuit against O'Neill, Hallgren, London and Richards (Flenniken had not contributed to the parody stories), alleging, among other things, copyright infringement, trademark infringement, and unfair competition. Disney later added Last Gasp publisher Ron Turner's name to the suit. The Pirates, in turn, claimed that the parody was fair use.

The initial decision by Judge Albert Charles Wollenberg in the U.S. District Court, delivered on July 7, 1972, went against the Air Pirates, and O'Neill's lawyers appealed to the United States Court of Appeals for the Ninth Circuit. O'Neill suggested the other Pirates settle, and leave him to defend the case alone. Hallgren and Turner settled with Disney, but London and Richards decided to continue fighting. To raise money for the Air Pirates Defense Fund, O'Neill and other underground cartoonists sold original artwork – predominantly of Disney characters – at comic book conventions.

During the legal proceedings and in violation of the temporary restraining order, the Air Pirates published some of the material intended for the third issue of Air Pirates Funnies in the comic The Tortoise and the Hare (Last Gasp, 1971), of which nearly 10,000 issues were soon confiscated under a court order. In 1975, Disney won a $200,000 preliminary judgement and another restraining order, which O'Neill defied by continuing to draw Disney parodies.

The case dragged on for several years. Finally, in 1978, the Ninth Circuit ruled against the Air Pirates 3-0 for copyright infringement, although they dismissed the trademark infringement claims. In 1979 the Supreme Court refused to hear an appeal. O'Neill later claimed that his plan in the Disney lawsuit was to lose, appeal, lose again, continue drawing his parodies, and eventually to force the courts to either allow him to continue or send him to jail.

O'Neill's four-page Mickey Mouse story Communiqué #1 from the M.L.F. (Mouse Liberation Front) appeared in the magazine CoEvolution Quarterly #21 in 1979. Disney asked the court to hold O'Neill in contempt of court and have him prosecuted criminally, along with Stewart Brand, publisher of CoEvolution Quarterly. By mid-1979, O'Neill recruited diverse artists for a "secret" artist's organization, The Mouse Liberation Front. An M.L.F. art show was displayed in New York City, Philadelphia and San Diego. With the help of sympathetic Disney employees, O'Neill delivered The M.L.F. Communiqué #2 in person to the Disney studios, where he posed drawing Mickey Mouse at an animation table and allegedly smoked a joint in Walt Disney's office.

In 1980, weighing the unrecoverable $190,000 in damages and $2,000,000 in legal fees against O'Neill's continuing disregard for the court's decisions, Disney settled the case, dropping the contempt charges and promising not to enforce the judgment as long as the Pirates no longer infringed Disney's copyrights.

New York Law School professor Edward Samuels said of O'Neill after the judgment, "I was flabbergasted. He told me he had won the case. 'No, Dan,' I told him, 'You lost.' 'No, I won.' 'No, you lost.' To Dan O'Neill, not going to jail constituted victory." Samuels said of the Air Pirates, "They set parody back twenty years."

O'Neill was interviewed about the ordeal in the 1988 documentary film Comic Book Confidential.

== Publications ==
- Air Pirates Funnies #1–2 (Last Gasp "Hell Comics" imprint, July–August 1971)
- The Tortoise and the Hare (Last Gasp, 1971) – includes material intended for Air Pirates Funnies #3
- Air Pirates Funnies Tabloid (Air Pirates Collective, July 1972)

During the height of the Air Pirates "moment" (1971–1973), members of the collective were featured in other solo titles or anthologies:

- Dan O'Neill's Comics and Stories (3 issues, Company & Sons, 1971) – Dan O'Neill
- Dirty Duck (Company & Sons, Dec. 1971) – Bobby London
- Dopin' Dan #1–3 (Last Gasp, May 1972–October 1973) – Ted Richards
- Merton of the Movement (Last Gasp "Cocoanut Comix" imprint, Oct. 1972) – anthology featuring London, Richards, Gary Hallgren, and Shary Flenniken
- Left Field Funnies (Apex Novelties, late 1972) – including work by London, Gary King, and Willy Murphy

== See also ==
- "The Disneyland Memorial Orgy", a poster by Paul Krassner and Wally Wood, published in The Realist in May 1967
- Mickey Rat, an obvious parody of Mickey Mouse by Robert Armstrong, first appearing in 1971
- Arne Anka, a Swedish comic strip drawn by Charlie Christensen under the pseudonym "Alexander Barks" from 1983 to 1995. The title character closely resembles Donald Duck (who is called "Kalle Anka" in Swedish)
