= HistoryLink =

Online encyclopedia of Washington State history

- Website type: 501(c)(3) non-profit
- Available in: English
- Owner: History Ink
- Website: www.historylink.org
- Launched: May 1, 1998
- Current status: Active

HistoryLink is an online encyclopedia of Washington state history. The site has more than 8,100 entries. It has 500 biographies and more than 14,000 images.

The non-profit historical organization History Ink produces HistoryLink.org, stating that it is the nation's first online encyclopedia of local and state history created expressly for the Internet. Walt Crowley was the founding president and executive director.

== History ==
In 1997, Crowley discussed preparing a Seattle-King County historical encyclopedia for the 2001 sesquicentennial of the Denny Party. His wife Marie McCaffrey suggested publishing the encyclopedia on the Internet.

They and Paul Dorpat incorporated History Ink on November 10, 1997, with seed money from Priscilla "Patsy" Collins, by birth a member of Seattle's wealthy and prominent Bullitt family. The prototype of HistoryLink.org debuted on May 1, 1998, and attracted additional funding for a formal launch on January 15, 1999, with 300 entries. The website was noted for its coverage of the 1999 WTO protests in Downtown Seattle, maintaining a live webcam feed pointed at the intersection of 4th Avenue and Pike Street that refreshed every 30 seconds. The website received more than 1.5 million views during the WTO protests, which overwhelmed the server at times. In 2003, HistoryLink expanded its content to cover Washington state history, including new essays and features. Meanwhile, HistoryLink continues, focusing on the production of history books.

Following Crowley's death in 2007, McCaffrey served as HistoryLink's executive director before her departure in 2023. Jennifer Ott replaced her as HistoryLink's executive director.

A 2008 grant from the Henry M. Jackson Foundation funded several freelance writers to expand coverage of Snohomish County. The Snohomish County Historic Preservation Commission has funded yearly grants for the same purpose.

== Content ==
HistoryLink primarily features articles that are similar to a traditional encyclopedia entry, as well as timeline entries and first-person accounts called "People's Histories." The website has around 50 historians who are paid a rate of $775 per article.

== Organization ==
History Ink is a 501(c)(3) non-profit organization registered with the IRS in Seattle, and has been tax-exempt since May 1999. As of 2023, the organization had $758,000 in revenue, $641,000 in expenses and total assets of $798,000.

== Awards ==
Crowley and HistoryLink.org have won many awards, including

- The Pacific Northwest Historians Guild's 2007 History Award
- The Washington State Historic Preservation Office's award for media in 2001
- The Association of King County Historical Organizations award for best long-term project (2000)
