= Paul Dorpat =

American historian (1938–2026)

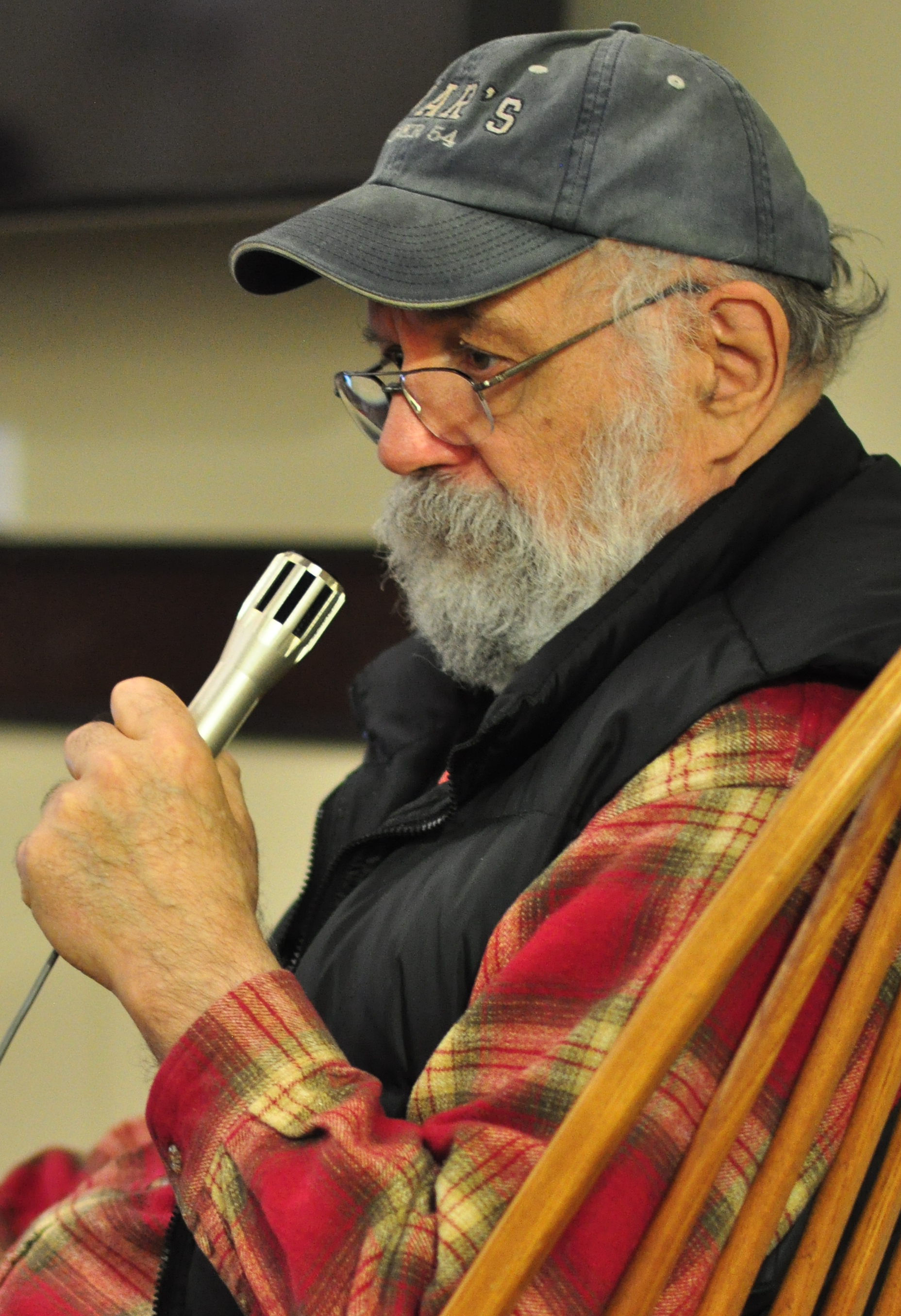
- Dorpat in 2016
- Born: October 28, 1938; Grand Forks, North Dakota, U.S.
- Died: May 27, 2026 (aged 87); Shoreline, Washington, U.S.
- Occupations: Writer, photographer, historian
- Years active: 1967–1970; 1981–2019
- Known for: Seattle Now & Then, Helix, HistoryLink.org

Paul Dorpat (October 28, 1938 – May 27, 2026) was an American historian, author and photographer, who specialized in the history of Seattle and Washington state. He had a weekly column in The Seattle Times and was the principal historian of HistoryLink.org, a site devoted to Washington state history.

== Life and career ==
Born in Grand Forks, North Dakota, on October 28, 1938, Dorpat grew up in Spokane, Washington. He was a key figure of Seattle's first underground newspaper, the Helix, which was published from March 23, 1967, until June 11, 1970. Dorpat's Times column "Now & Then" ran weekly from January 17, 1982, to December 20, 2019, totaling about 1,800 articles. Each week the column paired a historical photo of Seattle with an updated photo from an identical or similar point of view. He also wrote numerous books about Seattle, including Seattle Now and Then (2018), based on his column, on the Library of Congress bibliography for Seattle.

Dorpat died in Shoreline, Washington, on May 27, 2026, at the age of 87.
