= Gary Hallgren =

American illustrator and underground cartoonist

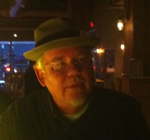
- Hallgren in Allentown, Pennsylvania
- Born: October 28, 1945 (age 81) Washington state, U.S.
- Areas: Cartoonist, Illustrator
- Notable works: Air Pirates Funnies

Gary Hallgren (born October 28, 1945) is an American illustrator and underground cartoonist. Illustrations by Hallgren have been "commissioned by publications such as The New York Times, Men's Health, The Wall Street Journal, Mad, and Entertainment Weekly, among others."

== Biography ==
Growing up outside of Bellingham, Washington, Hallgren studied painting and design at Western Washington State College. He joined the underground comix scene sometime around 1970, publishing his first narrative story in Northwest Passage, a local underground newspaper.

In early 1971 cartoonist Dan O'Neill invited Hallgren — then based in Seattle — and some other artists to San Francisco to form the Air Pirates collective. The Air Pirates lived together in a warehouse on Harrison Street in San Francisco. They teamed up to produce two issues of Air Pirates Funnies. Hallgren's work in Air Pirates Funnies, Pollyanna Pals, imitated Cliff Sterrett's old-time comic strip Polly and Her Pals. Air Pirates Funnies contained parody versions of (among other figures) Mickey Mouse, which led to a highly publicized lawsuit from The Walt Disney Company. Hallgren also did the cover artwork and stories for a follow-up comic, The Tortoise and the Hare (Last Gasp, 1971) (of which nearly 10,000 issues were soon confiscated under a court order). The initial court decision, delivered on July 7, 1972, went against the Air Pirates, and O'Neill's lawyers appealed to the United States Court of Appeals for the Ninth Circuit. O'Neill suggested the other Pirates settle, and leave him to defend the case alone. Hallgren and the publisher, Ron Turner, settled with Disney.

Other underground comix to which Hallgren contributed included Comix Book, San Francisco Comic Book, and Manhunt #2 (Cartoonists Co-Op Press, Dec. 1974).

From about 1986 to 1988, Hallgren was part of Upstart Associates, a shared studio space on West 29th Street in New York City. Founded by Howard Chaykin, Walt Simonson, Val Mayerik, and Jim Starlin; the membership of the studio changed over time, and at the point Hallgren joined, Upstart consisted of Simonson and James Sherman. Hallgren left the studio when he bought a house in Long Island.

He illustrated the four-issue limited series Mort the Dead Teenager, written by Larry Hama and published by Marvel Comics in 1993–1994.

In 1994, Hallgren was one of a number of cartoonists (including Ivan Brunetti) who applied to take over the long-time syndicated newspaper strip Nancy. (In 1995, Guy and Brad Gilchrist were given control of the strip.)

Hallgren illustrated Mehmet Oz's book, YOU: The Owner’s Manual: An Insider’s Guide to the Body That Will Make You Healthier and Younger, published in May 2005 by William Morrow Paperbacks.

As of May 2006 Hallgren lived in Granby, Massachusetts and had his studio in Holyoke. Since 2015, Hallgren has been providing art for Hägar the Horrible, a popular newspaper comic strip distributed by King Features Syndicate.
