= Dan O'Neill =

American cartoonist (born 1942)

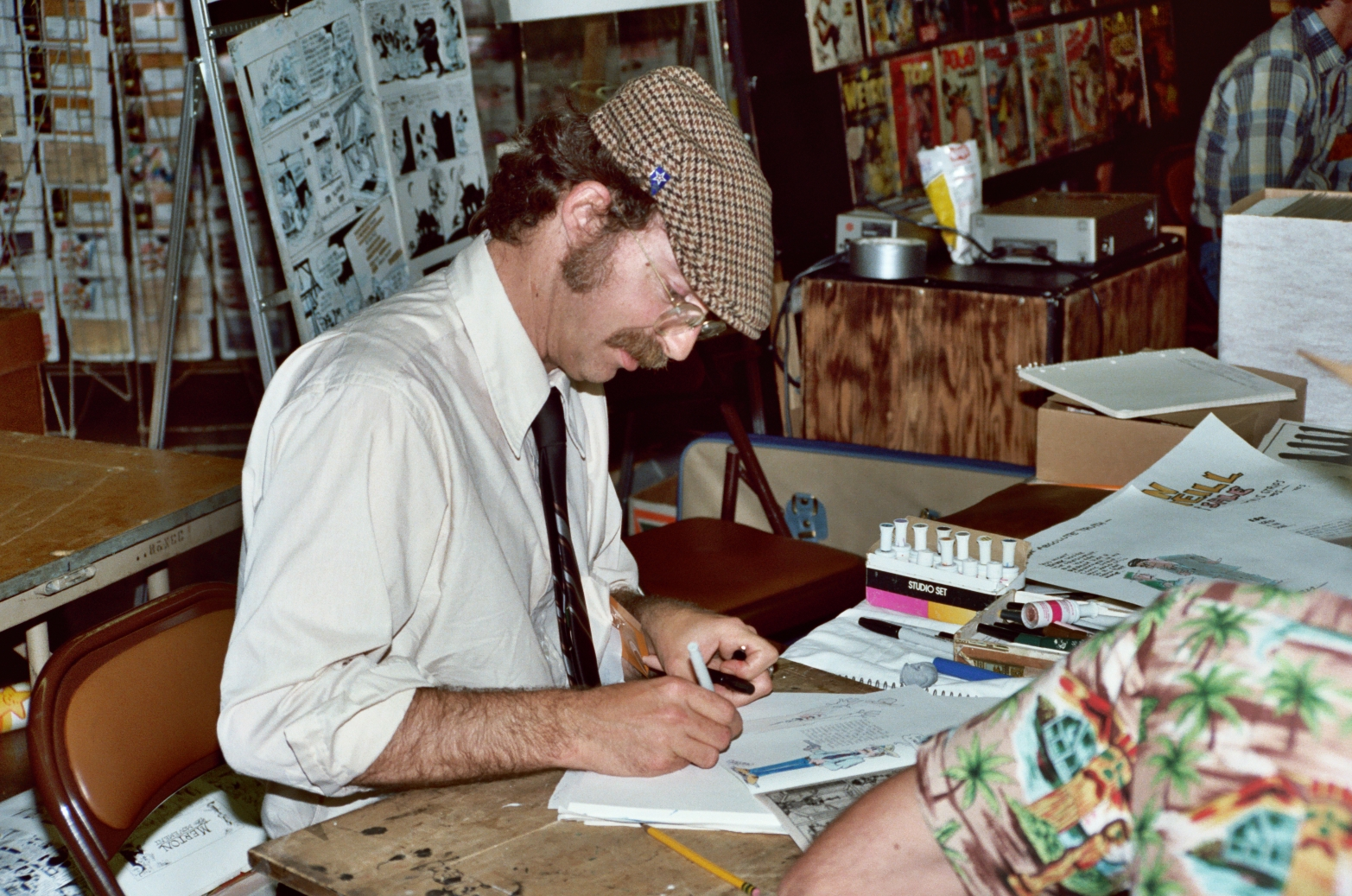
- O'Neill in 1982
- Born: April 21, 1942 (age 84)
- Areas: Cartoonist, Writer, Penciller
- Notable works: Odd Bodkins
- Awards: Yellow Kid Award, Grand Guinigi, 1975

Dan O'Neill (born April 21, 1942) is an American underground cartoonist, creator of the syndicated comic strip Odd Bodkins and founder of the underground comics collective the Air Pirates.

== Education ==
O'Neill attended the University of San Francisco, making contributions to the San Francisco Foghorn, the school newspaper.

== Odd Bodkins ==
Odd Bodkins began its run in 1964 in the San Francisco Chronicle when O'Neill was 21 years old. The strip consisted of the adventures of Hugh and Fred Bird. During the course of the strip's run, it increasingly reflected O'Neill's life in and his critique of 1960s counterculture. Though he considered himself a strong writer, O'Neill said of his artwork, "I had a very weak line. Either that or palsy."

As Odd Bodkins became increasingly political, O'Neill feared that the Chronicle, which held the strip's copyright, would fire him and hire another artist. The Chronicle had axed Odd Bodkins a few times already, but it had been reinstated following reader protests. O'Neill decided on an odd tactic to regain control of his strip: he would engage in copyright infringement, which he reasoned would force the paper to surrender the strip's copyright back to him for fear of being sued. O'Neill worked 28 Walt Disney characters, including Mickey Mouse and Pluto, into the strip. In late November 1970, the Chronicle fired O'Neill for the final time but did not continue to run the strip.

In 1972, during O'Neill's legal battles with Disney over Air Pirates Funnies, the Chronicle finally transferred the copyright of Odd Bodkins back to O'Neill.

=== Air Pirates and Disney lawsuit ===
O'Neill decided to become an underground comic book mogul and gathered other young artists into a collective called the Air Pirates, whose members included Bobby London, Gary Hallgren, Shary Flenniken and Ted Richards. Their two-issue series Air Pirates Funnies included parodies of Mickey Mouse and other copyrighted characters, which led to a famous lawsuit by The Walt Disney Company. O'Neill took the lead in fighting the suit, promoting it as a free-speech case in his "Mouse Liberation Front" campaign. He and Richards were the last Air Pirates to settle with Disney after a long, highly publicized and expensive legal battle. Although criticized for engaging in a legal conflict that seemed pointless, O'Neill had no regrets taking this stand on principle, saying, "Doing something stupid once is just plain stupid. Doing something stupid twice is a philosophy."

== Other work ==
In the midst of the Disney lawsuit, O'Neill traveled to Ireland and later to Wounded Knee, South Dakota, where he pioneered the genre of comic strip journalism with The Penny-Ante Republican, a four-page, single-sheet comic which sold for one cent, and which told stories of O'Neill's experiences with the Irish Republican Army and the American Indian Movement. For this work, the 11th international Congress of Cartoonists and Animators would present him with the Yellow Kid Award in 1975.

O'Neill later drew a short-lived, full color strip for the National Lampoon about the adventures of the Bat-winged Hamburger Snatcher, and returned to the Chronicle with a weekly strip, titled simply O'Neill, which ran from 1980 to 1985. The final year of O'Neill was reprinted in Comics Revue.

Dan O'Neill was one of twenty-two artists and writers featured in the documentary Comic Book Confidential. He was interviewed while playing pool next to two scantily clad women. He describes his career as "if you're going down in flames you might as well hit something big."

In 2008, he appeared in the documentary film RiP!: A Remix Manifesto, which discussed the negative effects of copyright laws. O'Neill stated that he made fun of Disney in large part because they were the worst at using lawsuits to stifle parodies, spoofs, and other fair use commentaries.

== Awards ==
- 1975 Yellow Kid Award
- 1975 Grand Guinigi: Best Foreign Artist
- 1979 Inkpot Award

== Personal life ==
O'Neill currently lives in Nevada City, California, where he continues to draw Odd Bodkins and is a director in the Original Sixteen to One gold mine.

== Bibliography ==
=== Comic books ===
- Dan O'Neill's Comics and Stories Vol. 1, #1–3 (Company & Sons, 1971)
- Dan O'Neill's Comics and Stories Vol. 2, #1–2 (Comics and Comix, 1975)
- Air Pirates Funnies Vol. 1, #1–2 (Last Gasp, July–August 1971)
- The Tortoise and the Hare #1 (Last Gasp, October 1971)
- The Three Little Pigs (1971) — one-shot, part of the Air Pirates campaign
- Air Pirates Funnies tabloid (Air Pirates Collective, July 1972)
- Penny-Ante Republican (self-published, 1972–1973)
- Hoksila and his Friends (1975)
- COG (1998) — smaller than "digest size" comic with single story
- Odd Bodkins, National Lampoon, Jan 1977

=== Collections ===
- Buy This Odd Bodkins Book (Decorative Design Pub., 1965)
- Hear the Sound of My Feet Walking... Drown the Sound of My Voice Talking: An Odd Bodkins Book (Glide Urban Center Publications, 1969)
- The Collective Unconscience of Odd Bodkins (Glide, 1973)
- The Log of the Irish Navy (Hugh O'Neill and Associates, 1983)
- Farewell to the Gipper (Eclipse Books, 1988)
