= Creator ownership in comics =

Business agreement for comic creators, especially in the United States

In the United States, creator ownership in comics is an arrangement in which the comic book creator retains full ownership of the material, regardless of whether the work is self-published or published by a corporate publisher.

In some fields of publishing, such as fiction writing, creator ownership has historically been standard. In other fields—such as comics, recorded music, or motion pictures—creator ownership has traditionally been uncommon, with either work for hire or publisher purchase of the material being standard practice.

== History ==
=== Early twentieth century ===
In 1906, Richard F. Outcault took his creation Buster Brown from the New York Herald to the New York American. Outcault had not applied for a copyright to Buster Brown, but asserted a "common-law title"—what comics historian Don Markstein asserted is one of the earliest claims to creators' rights. The court decided the Herald owned the Buster Brown name and title and the copyright on the strips it published, but the characters themselves were too intangible to qualify for copyright or trademark. This freed Outcault to continue the strip in the American as long as he did not use the Buster Brown name. (Note: Many sources erroneously assert this case was over the Yellow Kid, though no records exist of a lawsuit over that character.)

=== 1960s ===
Creator-owned titles began to appear during the late-1960s underground comix movement; these themes were exemplified in the formation of Rip Off Press, the United Cartoon Workers of America (UCWA), and Cartoonists' Co-Op Press.

Rip Off Press was founded in 1969 by four men—two of whom were cartoonists Gilbert Shelton and Jack Jackson, as a sort of cartoonists' cooperative, an alternative publishing venue to burgeoning Bay Area publishers like the Print Mint and Apex Novelties.

=== 1970s ===
The United Cartoon Workers of America was an informal union organized in 1970 by cartoonists Robert Crumb, Justin Green, Bill Griffith, Nancy Griffith, Art Spiegelman, Spain Rodriguez, Roger Brand, and Michele Brand. Members of the UCWA agreed that all cartoonists would demand the same rate per page of comics, whether they were stars like Crumb or being published for the first time. They also agreed to not work for any publisher who had "cheated" other cartoonists. Dennis Kitchen's Kitchen Sink Press formed the "Local 2 — Milwaukee" branch of the UCWA, and the UCWA brand appeared on a number of comix from that era.

Company & Sons, founded as a cooperative in 1970, only lasted until 1973.

Cartoonists' Co-Op Press was a 1973–1974 self-publishing venture by cartoonists Griffith, Spiegelman, Kim Deitch, Jerry Lane, Jay Lynch, Willy Murphy, and Diane Noomin. Like Rip Off Press and the short-lived Company & Sons, it was founded as an alternative to the existing underground publishers, which were perceived as not being honest with their accounting practices.

The short-lived genre publisher Atlas/Seaboard Comics, which operated from 1974 to 1975, offered some of the highest rates in the industry, plus return of artwork to artists and author rights to original character creations.

Up to the mid-1970s, most comic book publishers kept all original pages, in some cases destroying them in lieu of storing them safely.

By 1974, James Warren's Warren Publishing began changing the industry's work-for-hire dynamic by offering higher page-rates than DC Comics or Marvel Comics, and allowing the artists to retain their original artwork, giving creators the option to gain extra income by selling the pages to collectors. Nonetheless, Warren Publishing retained all creator's rights. As James Warren once told artist Bernie Wrightson:

. . . I don't own the originals but I do own the rights. That means everything. Every printing right imaginable. Do what you want with the originals—put 'em in your closet, hang 'em on your wall, give 'em away, sell 'em, but, if you sell your work and the guy you sell it to sells it to the next guy and he sells it to the next guy and he sells it to the next guy—all the way down the line—and if the 17th guy who buys it, prints it somewhere without my permission, I'm going to hold you responsible.

By 1975 or 1976, both DC and Marvel also began returning artists' original pages to them.

During the 1970s, artist Neal Adams was politically active in the industry, and attempted to unionize its creative community. Adams attempted to form the Comics Creators Guild, with a contentious meeting in May 1978 attended by Cary Bates, Howard Chaykin, Chris Claremont, Steve Ditko, Michael Golden, Archie Goodwin, Paul Levitz, Bob McLeod, Frank Miller, Carl Potts, Marshall Rogers, Jim Shooter, Walt Simonson, Jim Starlin, Len Wein, and Marv Wolfman. The effort failed to get off the ground.

In addition, Adams, along with the Joker creator Jerry Robinson, notably and vocally helped lead the lobbying efforts that resulted in Superman creators Jerry Siegel and Joe Shuster receiving decades-overdue credit and some financial remuneration from Superman publisher DC Comics.

Marvel Comics had a mixed history of responding to the issue of creator's rights. In 1978, Marvel and Howard the Duck writer Steve Gerber clashed over issues of creative control, and Gerber was abruptly removed from the series. This was the first highly publicized creator's rights case in American comics, and attracted support from major industry figures. Gerber subsequently launched a lengthy legal battle for control of Howard the Duck, culminating in a 1981 lawsuit.

=== 1980s ===
In 1980, Marvel created the mature readers anthology Epic Illustrated, offering its writers and artists ownership rights and royalties in place of the industry-standard work for hire contracts. The success of Epic Illustrated led to the 1982 formation of the long-running imprint Epic Comics, which specialized in creator-owned titles.

Around this same period, however, industry legend Jack Kirby, co-creator of many of Marvel's most popular characters, came into dispute with the company over the disappearance of original pages of artwork from some of his most famous and popular titles. Kirby had quit working for Marvel in 1979, angry over what he perceived as the company's mistreatment of him. Best-selling creators like Alan Moore, Frank Miller, and many other stars became vocal advocates for Kirby. Neal Adams also petitioned to have his Marvel originals returned, and the pair won their battle in 1987, when Marvel returned original artwork to him and Kirby, among others. This decision helped lead to the modern industry's standard practice of returning original artwork to the artist, who can earn additional income from art sales to collectors.

Beginning in the 1980s, several new publishers and imprints went into business, offering comics writers and artists the opportunity to have their work published while retaining the copyrights to the characters and the stories. Publishers like Pacific Comics and Eclipse Comics were strong promoters of creator-owned superhero properties; their enticement of popular creators (such as Kirby) to their pages helped push the issue to the fore and put pressure on industry giants Marvel and DC. The alternative and independent publishers Fantagraphics and Dark Horse Comics entered the field during this period as well. Creator-owned properties allowed series to continue with multiple publishers as circumstances required; Usagi Yojimbo for instance has been published by four succeeding publishing houses.

In the mid-to-late 1980s, creator ownership became a cause célèbre among many comics creators, including those working in the dominant genre of superheroes. Creators' repeated clashes with DC Comics, First Comics, and other publishers led to an industry-wide debate about the issue. In the fall of 1988, DC revised the company's work-for-hire agreements to give more power to individual creators.

Writer Alan Moore became increasingly concerned at the lack of creator's rights in British comics In 1985, he noted that he had stopped working for all British publishers except IPC, publishers of 2000 AD, "purely for the reason that IPC so far have avoided lying to me, cheating me or generally treating me like crap" He joined other creators in decrying the wholesale relinquishing of all rights, and in 1986 stopped writing for 2000 AD as well. Moore's outspoken opinions and principles, particularly on the subject of creator's rights and ownership, would see him burn bridges with a number of other publishers over the course of his career.

==== Creator's Bill of Rights ====
In November 1988, a number of independent comic book artists and writers drafted the Creator's Bill of Rights, a document designed to protect their rights as creators and aid against their exploitation by corporate work for hire practices. Issues covered by the Bill included giving creators proper credit for their characters and stories, profit-sharing, distribution, fair contracts, licensing, and return of original artwork. Through a series of meetings, a document was finalized at the "Northampton Summit" held in Northampton, Massachusetts, and signed by all in attendance. Scott McCloud was the principal author of the Bill; other artists and writers participating in the Bill's creation included Dave Sim, Steve Bissette, Larry Marder, Rick Veitch, Peter Laird, and Kevin Eastman. In the end, however, many prominent comic book professionals, including some involved in its drafting, hold that the Creator's Bill of Rights itself had little or no impact on the industry.

=== 1990s ===
In 1990, Creator's Bill of Rights signatory Kevin Eastman founded the creator-friendly Tundra Publishing to embody the ideals of the Bill from a publishers' standpoint. As part of the initial group who "got together to form the" Bill, Eastman felt obligated to expand it beyond theory and into practice, providing a creator-friendly forum for comics creators to work for a publisher while maintaining ownership of their work. Tundra went bankrupt in 1993.

In 1992, a number of popular Marvel artists formed their own company, Image Comics, which would serve as a prominent example of creator-owned comics publishing. Propelled by star power and upset that they did not own the popular characters they created for Marvel, several illustrators, including the X-Men's Jim Lee, The New Mutants/X-Force's Rob Liefeld, and Spider-Man's Todd McFarlane formed Image, an umbrella label under which several autonomous, creator-owned companies existed. Image properties, such as WildC.A.T.s, Gen^{13}, Witchblade and especially McFarlane's Spawn provided brisk competition for long-standing superheroes. Many popular creators followed Image's lead and attempted to use their star power to launch their own series, ones for which they would have licensing rights and editorial control. Chris Claremont, famous for his long run as the writer of Uncanny X-Men, created Sovereign Seven for DC; Joe Madureira, also made popular by Uncanny X-Men, launched Battle Chasers for WildStorm Productions; and Kurt Busiek, Alex Ross, and Brent Anderson created Astro City for Image.

DC's Vertigo imprint, launched in 1993, was the company's first successful attempt to routinely publish creator-owned series (right from its launch with Peter Milligan and Duncan Fegredo's Enigma). From the start, Vertigo founding editor Karen Berger was committed to creator-owned projects, working on several "[her]self with new writers and artists" as well as established names, with the express intention of "trying to bring new people into the industry, as well as use some of the best creators in comics". In addition to creator-owned series set in their own continuity, such as Enigma and Fallen Angel, DC published several creator-owned series, such as Sovereign Seven and Xero, that were set within the DC Universe.

In 1994, Dark Horse Comics founded the Legend imprint in part to provide star creators like Frank Miller and John Byrne an avenue for creator-owned projects.
