= Leslie Cabarga =

American author, illustrator, cartoonist, animator, and publication designer

- Born: 1954 (age 71–72); New York City, U.S.
- Occupations: Author, Illustrator, Cartoonist, Animator, Font designer, Publication designer
- Notable credit(s): The Fleischer Story; in the Golden Age of Animation; The Logo, Font & Lettering Bible
- Website: lesliecabarga.com

Zavier Leslie Cabarga (b. 1954 in New York), popularly known as Leslie Cabarga, is an American author, illustrator, cartoonist, animator, font designer, and publication designer. A participant in the underground comix movement in the early 1970s, he has since gone on to write and/or edit over 40 books. His art style evokes images from the 1920s and 1930s, and over the years Cabarga has created many products associated with Betty Boop. His book The Fleischer Story in the Golden Age of Animation, originally published in 1976, has become the authoritative history of the Fleischer Studios.

== Biography ==
At age 14, Cabarga began selling cartoons to underground newspapers such as the East Village Other, Rat Subterranean News, Screw, and Gothic Blimp Works. He left high school at 15 to pursue a cartooning career, at first self-publishing minicomics, and then, after relocating to San Francisco, publishing comics in San Francisco Comic Book, Yellow Dog, Comix Book, and many other comix of that era. His most prolific period in the milieu of underground comix was from 1971 to 1976. His cartoons were also published in the National Lampoon issues #60, 62, 66, all released in 1975.

By the mid-1970s, Carbaga was working in publication design, serving as an assistant art director at such publications as Rolling Stone, Outside, and Rock Magazine. He published his first book, a history of the Fleischer Studios called The Fleischer Story in the Golden Age of Animation, in 1976.

By the early 1980s Cabarga had become one of the most popular illustrators in New York, creating covers for Time, Newsweek, and Fortune, to name just a few. His work has appeared in several Art Directors Club of New York annuals, as well as their print annual, and he is profiled in Walt Reed's book The Illustrator in America, 1860-2000 (Watson-Guptill, 2001). Cabarga provided illustrations for The J. Geils Band 1982 album Showtime!

Cabarga was the first American illustrator to draw the Nintendo character Mario, in a poster for the video game Donkey Kong in 1981.

A few of the typefaces Cabarga has designed include Magneto, Bad Typ, Casey, Streamline, and Raceway.

From 2007 to 2009, Cabarga edited the Dark Horse Comics series Harvey Comics Classics, which included five volumes and two special issues.

In 2014 Cabarga transitioned from graphic, book, logo, and font design as his primary occupation to that of fine carpentry and cabinet-making. After completing construction of his own Tiny House on wheels, a design based on the Vienna 1900 style, he went on to create a custom interior for a 1953 Spartan Royal Mansion RV in the Art Deco style.

Cabarga is based in Southern California, where he plays ukulele and piano with the CA State Old Time Fiddlers Association.

== Comics ==
=== Solo titles ===
- Fungus (Self-published, 1969)
- Modern Medical Romances (San Francisco Comic Book Company, 1972) — 8-p. minicomic
- Plain Talk (San Francisco Comic Book Company, 1972) — minicomic
- The Abduction of Dot Darling (Self-published, 1974) — later published in Comix Book #2
- Buddy Baker Crooner For Hire (Self-published, 1974) — later published in Comix Book #4-5

=== Anthologies ===
- Real Pulp Comics #1 –2 (Print Mint, 1971, 1973)
- Cloud Comix #2 (Head Imports, 1972)
- Eric Fromm's Comics and Stories (San Francisco Comic Book Company, 1973) — minicomic; other contributors were Larry Rippee and Trina Robbins
- Yellow Dog #25 (Print Mint, Fall 1973)
- San Francisco Comic Book #4 (Print Mint, Oct. 1973)
- Lean Years (Cartoonists Co-Op Press, May 1974) — anthology about the Great Depression edited by Barry Siegel and Bruce Simon
- Manhunt #2 (Cartoonists Co-Op Press, Dec. 1974) — anthology edited by Terry Richards
- Comix Book #2 (Marvel Comics, Jan. 1975)
- Comix Book #3 (Marvel Comics, Mar. 1975)
- Comix Book #4 (Kitchen Sink Press, Feb. 1976) — cover and an inside story
- Comix Book #5 (Kitchen Sink Press, July 1976)
- Human Drama (Print Mint, 1978) — anthology title edited by Jim Madow
- Dope Comix #1 (Kitchen Sink Press, 1978) — cover artwork
- Snarf #9 (Kitchen Sink Press, Feb. 1981) — cover artwork
- Betty Boop's Big Break (First Comics, 1990) — cover art, inks & letters

=== Editor ===
- Of Cows, Crows & Armadillos (Kitchen Sink Press, 1990)
- Cabarga, Leslie, ed. (2007). Harvey Comics Classics Volume One: Casper the Friendly Ghost. Introduction by Jerry Beck. Milwaukie, Oregon: Dark Horse Books. ISBN 978-1-59307-781-5.
- Cabarga, Leslie, ed. (2007). Harvey Comics Classics Volume Two: Richie Rich the Poor Little Rich Boy. Introduction by Jerry Beck. Milwaukie, Oregon: Dark Horse Books. ISBN 978-1-59307-848-5.
- Cabarga, Leslie, ed. (2008). Harvey Comics Classics Volume Three: Hot Stuff the Little Devil. Introduction by Jerry Beck. Milwaukie, Oregon: Dark Horse Books. ISBN 978-1-59307-914-7.
- Cabarga, Leslie, ed. (2008). Harvey Comics Classics Volume Four: Baby Huey the Baby Giant. Introduction by Jerry Beck. Milwaukie, Oregon: Dark Horse Books. ISBN 978-1-59307-977-2.
- Cabarga, Leslie, ed. (2009). Harvey Comics Classics Volume Five: The Harvey Girls Little Audrey, Little Dot & Little Lotta. Introduction by Jerry Beck. Milwaukie, Oregon: Dark Horse Books. ISBN 978-1-59582-171-3.
- Cabarga, Leslie, ed. (2009). Casper The Friendly Ghost 60th Anniversary Special. Milwaukie, Oregon: Dark Horse Books. ISBN 978-1-59582-467-7.

== Bibliography (selected) ==
- The Fleischer Story in the Golden Age of Animation (Nostalgia Press, 1976; re-issued by Da Capo Press, 1988)
- The Logo, Font & Lettering Bible: A Comprehensive Guide to the Design, Construction, and Usage of Alphabets and Symbols (How Design Books, 1994) — manual detailing how to create lettering from scratch
- The Designer's Guide to Color Combinations (North Light Books, 1999) ISBN 978-0891348573
- Talks with Trees: a Plant Psychic's Interviews with Vegetables, Flowers and Trees (Iconoclassics Publishing Co., 1997) ISBN 978-0965762809
- The Secret Life of Logos: Behind the Scenes with Top Designers (HOW Books, 2007) ISBN 1-58180-868-2
- We Hold These Truths (Iconoclassics Publishing Co., 2010) ISBN 978-0965762823
- Topless Summer Love Girls: A Gentleman's Guide to Women, Relationships & Breasts (Iconoclassics, 2010) ISBN 978-0965762847
