= Joe Schenkman =

American cartoonist

- Born: Joseph Quarles Schenkman; September 8, 1947 (age 79)
- Areas: Cartoonist, Editor
- Notable works: Arcade; Ransom: A Play with Music, collaborator and historian. Performed first time in Rochester, Vermont, Dick Robson, playwright, Ethan Bowen, director, April Dodd, intern. Original music by Jake Wildwood and Dorothy Robson, music director, at Rochester High School Auditorium 2010. Performed at Lost Nation Theater in Montpelier, Vermont, April 25 to May 12, 2013.
- Collaborators: Kathryn Miles Schenkman, Mindy Brandstetter

Joseph Quarles Schenkman (born September 8, 1947) is an American publisher and underground cartoonist.

Schenkman was part of underground cartooning's original wave, active in the late 1960s, as a regular contributor to Rat Subterranean News, Gothic Blimp Works and the East Village Other in New York City.

== Arcade ==
In San Francisco in the early 1970s, he worked alongside such cartoonists as S. Clay Wilson, Spain Rodriguez, Justin Green, Bill Griffith and Art Spiegelman. With the latter three, he collaborated on Arcade: The Comics Revue. In the 1980s, his cartoons appeared regularly in the National Lampoon, where he was a contributing editor and collaborated with P.J. O'Rourke on satirical features.

== Books ==
Schenkman is currently head of the Rochester, Vermont-based Schenkman Books. Founded by Alfred Schenkman in 1961, Schenkman Books is known for sociology and social welfare titles. He is a musician who plays in the Skanktone Jug Band and Night Crawler.
