= Keith Green (art dealer) =

Art dealer

- Born: circa 1951; Chicago, Illinois, US
- Died: July 1, 1996 (aged 44–45); New York City, New York, US
- Occupations: Underground comix distributor and publisher, art dealer
- Years active: circa 1969–1996
- Known for: Keith Green / Industrial Realities; Saving Grace; Keith Green Gallery
- Relatives: Justin Green (brother)

Keith Green (c. 1951–1996) was an American publisher, distributor, and art dealer. Starting out in the late 1960s as an underground comix distributor, in the early 1970s, he published comics, and by the mid-1970s he had become a New York City art dealer. He was the younger brother of cartoonist Justin Green.

== Biography ==
=== Underground comix ===
Based in San Francisco as a teenager, Green distributed underground comix starting in circa 1969. He published comics during 1971–1977, with the bulk coming in 1975–1976, under such names as Keith Green / Industrial Realities and the imprint Saving Grace.

Green started out by doing later printings of comics published by other publishers. Around 1971, he produced the fourth through eighth printings of Robert Crumb's Big Ass Comics, originally published by Rip Off Press in 1969. Around the same time, Green reprinted Robert Williams' Coochy Cooty Men's Comics, originally published by the Print Mint in 1970. In 1976, he produced new printings of Ted Richards' Dopin' Dan #1-2, originally published by Last Gasp in 1972–1973.

When the self-publishing cooperative Cartoonists Co-Op Press started up in 1973, Green acted as salesman/distributor. In 1974, Green interviewed Robert Crumb for Inside Comics. Thanks to his visit to Crumb and his girlfriend, fellow cartoonist Aline Kominsky, Green helped finance their collaborative work, Dirty Laundry Comics #1, published by Cartoonists Co-Op Press in summer 1974.

The bulk of Green's publishing output was in 1975–1976, when he produced original comics by S. Clay Wilson, Jim Osborne, Willy Murphy, Ted Richards, Jerry Lane, and Spain Rodriguez. (Spain later said that Green was "quirky" and that publishing with him "was a mistake.")

Green's final publishing venture was The Snatch Sampler (1977), a 164-page book that reprinted material from Snatch Comics #1–3 (Apex Novelties/Print Mint) featuring Crumb, Wilson, Osborne, Victor Moscoso, Robert Williams, and Rory Hayes.

=== Art dealer ===
Green relocated to New York City around 1975, eventually operating the Keith Green Gallery on Park Avenue in New York City in the late 1980s. Artists he represented included Shaoul Smira, Marina Karella, Dragan Malešević Tapi, Anders Bertil Knutsson, Ivonne Baki, Basil Alkazzi, and a group of late-Soviet-period avant-garde Russian artists.

=== Death ===
Keith Green died of a heart attack on July 1, 1996.

== Titles published ==
- Dirty Laundry Comics (co-published with Cartoonists Co-Op Press, Summer 1974) – Robert Crumb and Aline Kominsky-Crumb
- D.O.A. Comics #1 (Oct. 1976) – Jim Osborne
- Felch Cumics (Aug. 1975) – Robert Williams, S. Clay Wilson, Jim Osborne, William Stout and other contributors
- Flamed-Out Funnies #1 (Summer 1975) – Willy Murphy; later continued by Rip Off Press
- Middle Class Fantasies #2 (Oct. 1976) – Jerry Lane; continued from Cartoonists Co-Op Press (also reprinted issue #1)
- The Snatch Sampler (1977) – reprints material from Snatch Comics #1–3 (Apex Novelties/Print Mint) featuring Robert Crumb, S. Clay Wilson, Victor Moscoso, Robert Williams, Rory Hayes, and Jim Osborne
- Subvert Comics #3 (1976) – Spain Rodriguez; continued from Rip Off Press
- 2 (2 issues, 1975–1976) – S. Clay Wilson; second issue called "Two Squared"
- Two Fools (1976) – Ted Richards and Willy Murphy
