= Alias the Cat! =

Graphic novel by Kim Deitch

- Cover of the hardcover first edition of Alias the Cat from Pantheon
- Date: 2007
- Page count: 136 pages
- Publisher: Pantheon Books

Creative team
- Creator: Kim Deitch

Original publication
- Published in: The Stuff of Dreams (Fantagraphics)
- Issues: 3
- Date of publication: 2002–2005
- ISBN: 978-0-375-42431-1

Alias the Cat is a graphic novel by American cartoonist Kim Deitch, published by Pantheon Books in 2007. It originally appeared as a three-issue comic book in 2002–2005 as The Stuff of Dreams from Fantagraphics Books.

The metafictional book stars Deitch himself and his best-known creation, Waldo the Cat. It's about a character named Alias the Cat who appeared in 1915 in a comic strip and a serial film, as well as in real life as a freedom-fighting superhero, but who mysteriously disappears. As Deitch researches the character, the story keeps getting more and more involved.

== Synopsis ==
=== Stuff of Dreams: Part 1 ===
Kim and his wife Pam visit a flea market, where they discover a rare collectible black cat toy. The vendor, Keller, proposes discussing its price at a nearby bar but instead recounts how he acquired the toy. As the narrative shifts to Keller’s perspective, he introduces Frankie, a fellow sailor and the toy’s original owner.

The story then transitions to Frankie’s viewpoint, detailing his experience of being shipwrecked on an idyllic island. There, he encounters Waldo, a figure revered by the island’s inhabitants, who create toys in his likeness. Over time, the islanders revolt against Waldo’s rule, culminating in a volcanic eruption that devastates the island.

The narrative continues shifting perspectives, ultimately revealing that Keller received the Waldo toy as a gift. The story returns to the present, where Keller, Pam, and Kim sit together in the bar. Upon returning home, Pam and Kim debate the credibility of Keller’s tale. The story concludes with them breaking the fourth wall, directly addressing the audience and asking if they have ever encountered Waldo or a Waldo doll—and, if so, whether they would deliver it to Pam.

=== Stuff of Dreams: Part 2 ===
Pam purchases a costume from an early serial film titled Alias the Cat, which was produced in New Jersey shortly before the U.S.'s entry into World War I. As the narrative unfolds, a tragic story emerges about Malek Janocheck, a Czech heir to a prominent Bohemian munitions dynasty. Rejecting his family’s legacy of warfare, Manek flees his homeland in search of a different path — one dedicated to artistic expression through the craft of fireworks.

Janochek's journey, which is marked by romance, adventure, and discovery, is echoed in the film serial as well as the panels of a comic strip Deitch presents (ostensibly drawn by "Moll Barkeley-Bakendorf"). The story ultimately leads to a small New Jersey town colloquially known as "Midgetville."

=== Stuff of Dreams: Part 3 No Midgets in Midgetville ===
In this final installment, the narrative delves into the lore of the legendary New Jersey town known as "Midgetville." Kim's investigation into the origins of the Alias the Cat strip takes him on an unpredictable journey through the eccentric landscapes of New Jersey, culminating in the corridors of New York's Bellevue Hospital. Interwoven with this exploration is a striking subplot featuring Waldo the Cat, whose story of love unfolds alongside a broader commentary on contemporary terrorism.

== Characters ==
Kim Deitch
The cartoonist metafictionally appears himself as a character in the story. The opening portions of the book have the flavor of Harvey Pekar's autobiographical American Splendor, as Deitch details aspects of his and his wife's lives in a seemingly autobiographical manner.
Pam Butler
Deitch's wife and obsessive collector of cartoon cats of the 1920s and 1930s.
Waldo
Deitch's best-known recurring character, a talking cartoon cat whom most people cannot see. He appears in various guises throughout the book.
Edward Keller
a former seaman who later becomes a market vendor who first shows Kim and Pam a stuffed Waldo toy.
Frankie
A fellow sailor and the original owner of the cat toy.
Lonnie
A native of the tropical island on which Frankie becomes stranded; they soon fall in love.
Ron Wiggley (née Wagstaff)
A trader in old stuffed cat toys and a member of furry fandom. He was born on a New Jersey commune to Marilyn Wagstaff.
Malek Janocheck
Czech heir to a prominent Bohemian munitions dynasty. Rejecting his family’s legacy of warfare, Manek flees his homeland in search of a different path — one dedicated to artistic expression through the craft of fireworks. Janocheck also stars in the Alias the Cat film serial.
Molly O'Dare
The female lead in the Alias the Cat film serial.
Molly Barkeley-Bakendorf
Cartoonist and illustrator of the fictional The Alias the Cat! comic strip.
Janos Manek
The fictional hero of The Alias the Cat! comic strip.
Mayor A. Moregraft
Mayor of the fictional town of Embezzleton.
Emily Morgraft
The daughter of Mayor Moregraft, and Janos' love interest.
Marilyn Wagstaff
Ron's mother and the daughter of the former mayor of Fairmont, New Jersey. After an early romance with Malek, she becomes a hippie and then an orderly at the Essex Mountain Sanitarium.
Rolfe Larson
An officer at the Fairmont First Bank who later becomes Marilyn's husband. He is a shady character.
Walter Kleinschmidt
A dwarf and the chief carpenter at Malek's factory; later a resident of Midgetville.
Dorothy "Dotty" Bakendorf-Weiss
Daughter of Molly Barkeley-Bakendorf and Mr. Bakendorf, a resident of Rumson, New Jersey.
Wanda Sponder
One of the last remaining residents of Midgetville.
Lowanda
Supposedly of pygmy heritage, she is known as "Waylow" because of her short stature; she is revealed to be Waldo's lover.
Rhea Santana
A psychiatrist at Bellevue Hospital.

== Publishing history ==
Originally Alias was published as a three-issue series of comics, called The Stuff of Dreams, published by Fantagraphics Books in 2002, 2004, and 2005. It was collected by Pantheon Books in hardcover form in 2007.

== Reception ==
When serialized as The Stuff of Dreams, the first issue won the Eisner Award for Best Single Issue/One-Shot in 2003. In addition, the series was nominated for a 2004 Ignatz Award for Outstanding Series, with issue #2 nominated for Outstanding Comic. Issue #3 was also nominated for an Ignatz Award, in 2006, for Outstanding Comic.

Greg McEllhatton called Alias the Cat! one of the stronger pieces of metafiction he'd seen in comics. In a positive review of the collected Alias the Cat, John Hodgman of The New York Times describes the book's metafictional layers:

...Deitch never lets up on the queasy conceit of the book: that Waldo is real — not a character, but an actual bit of cultural ephemera that Deitch accidentally copied.... Or else Waldo is an actual potty-mouthed cat demon whom only Deitch and other sages can see. Or else Deitch is just plain crazy. Deitch deals with all three possibilities so forthrightly and guilelessly that there are times when it's unclear whether you are reading a fanciful blend of fact and fiction or a massive, Henry Darger-esque bit of brilliant cuckoo.

In a positive review, Comic Book Resources wrote that "...Alias the Cat ... build[s] a mystery before our eyes, and show us that if we choose to look around us, we're surrounded by the stuff of dreams."

== See also ==
- The Boulevard of Broken Dreams
