= Willy Murphy =

American cartoonist

- Born: William Henry Murphy; October 2, 1936 Brooklyn, New York, U.S.
- Died: March 2, 1976 (aged 39) San Francisco, California, U.S.
- Area: Cartoonist - Underground Comix Artist
- Notable works: Arnold Peck the Human Wreck; Flamed-Out Funnies "Flamed Out - The Underground Adventures and Comix Genius of Willy Murphy"
- Collaborators: Harvey Pekar; Ted Richards; Gary Hallgren; Larry Todd; Dan O'Neill

Willy Murphy (October 2, 1936–March 2, 1976) was an American underground cartoonist. Murphy's humor focused on hippies and the counterculture. His signature character was Arnold Peck the Human Wreck, "a mid-30s beanpole with wry observations about his own life and the community around him." Murphy's solo title was called Flamed-Out Funnies; in addition, he contributed to such seminal underground anthologies as Arcade, Bijou Funnies, and San Francisco Comic Book, as well as the National Lampoon.

Murphy's work was of the "bigfoot" style of cartooning, with characters having long, droopy noses; and was characterized by strong, humorous writing.

== Biography ==
Murphy was born in Brooklyn, NY on October 2, 1936. Before becoming a cartoonist, he worked for eight years as an advertising copywriter at J. Walter Thompsonin New York City. The upheaval of the late 1960s, including experimenting with drug use and opposition to the Vietnam War, led Murphy to leave that world behind and dedicate himself to social commentary though his cartooning. In 1969, Murphy contributed to the all-comics tabloid Gothic Blimp Works. Moving to San Francisco around 1970, he was a key contributor to San Francisco Comic Book, and illustrated the cover of the fourth issue.

Sometime in the early 1970s, along with Larry Todd and Gary King, Murphy began hanging around the Air Pirates collective — Dan O'Neill, Shary Flenniken, Bobby London, Gary Hallgren, and Ted Richards — and contributing to their projects.

In early 1972, Murphy edited the comics section of Sunday Paper, the ambitious but brief-lived broadsheet section of underground comics published by John Bryan.

Murphy illustrated the convention program of Berkeleycon 73, the first comic convention that really highlighted underground comix.

In 1973–1974, Murphy helped co-found the self-publishing venture Cartoonists Co-Op Press, with Jay Lynch, Kim Deitch, Bill Griffith, Jerry Lane, Diane Noomin, and Art Spiegelman.

Murphy illustrated three early stories by Harvey Pekar, which were published in Murphy's own Flamed-Out Funnies #1 (Keith Green, 1975) and later appeared in one of Pekar's American Splendor collections (although not in the actual comic book series American Splendor).

In 1976, Murphy and Gary Hallgren worked closely with Gilbert Shelton and Ted Richards on Give Me Liberty: a Revised History of the American Revolution, Rip Off Press' comic about the hoopla surrounding the American Bicentennial.

=== Death ===
After developing a cold, Murphy died suddenly of pneumonia over the Washington's Birthday weekend in 1976.

Cartoonists at Murphy's funeral included Ted Richards, Melinda Gebbie, and Justin Green. Richards, who was Murphy's best friend, wrote a eulogy for him which was later published in Arcade #6 (Summer 1976). That issue also featured a portfolio of Murphy's work.

Flamed-Out Funnies #2 was published posthumously by Rip Off Press in November 1976. Some of Murphy's comics were also posthumously published in San Francisco Comic Book issue #5 and #7, released in 1980 and 1983 respectively.

== Legacy ==
Murphy's work inspired later cartoonists like Gilbert Shelton, Paul Mavrides, and Wayno.

== Bibliography ==
- Gothic Blimp Works #4 (East Village Other, 1969)
- All Stars (San Francisco Comic Book Company, 1970)
- San Francisco Comic Book #1–5, #7 (San Francisco Comic Book Company/Print Mint/Last Gasp, 1970–1983)
- Air Pirates Funnies Tabloid (Air Pirates Collective, 1972) — contribution to the anthology
- Dopin' Dan #1 (Last Gasp, May 1972) — contribution to Ted Richards' (mostly) solo title
- Left-Field Funnies (Apex Novelties, late 1972) — contribution to anthology mostly by members of the Air Pirates collective
- El Perfecto (Print Mint, 1973) — contribution to anthology raising money for the Timothy Leary Defense Fund
- Bijou Funnies #8 (Kitchen Sink Press, Nov. 1973)
- Short Order #2 (Family Fun, 1974) — contribution to anthology edited by Art Spiegelman
- Apex Treasury of Underground Comics (Links Books/Quick Fox, 1974; reprinted by Quick Fox, 1981) — reprints of material from other publications
- Manhunt Comix #2 (Cartoonists Co-Op Press, Dec. 1974) — contributions to anthology edited by Terry Richards
- Arcade #1–6 (Print Mint, 1975–1976)
- Flamed-Out Funnies #1–2 (Keith Green/Rip Off Press, Summer 1975–Nov. 1976)
- Two Fools (Saving Grace, a division of Keith Green Industrial Realities, 1976) — with Ted Richards
