= Bijou Funnies =

- Cover of Bijou Funnies #1 (Bijou Publishing Empire, Summer 1968), artwork by Jay Lynch.

Publication information
- Publisher: The Bijou Publishing Empire (1968); Print Mint (1969–1970); Kitchen Sink Press (1970–1973)
- Schedule: sporadically
- Format: 6-1/2" x 8-1/2"
- Publication date: Summer 1968 – Nov. 1973
- No. of issues: 8
- Main character(s): Nard n' Pat; Snappy Sammy Smoot; The Fabulous Furry Freak Brothers; Mr. Natural

Creative team
- Artist(s): Jay Lynch, Art Spiegelman, Gilbert Shelton, Skip Williamson, Robert Crumb, Jay Kinney, Justin Green, Kim Deitch
- Editor(s): Jay Lynch

Collected editions
- The Best of Bijou Funnies: ISBN 978-0825630545

Bijou Funnies was an American underground comix magazine which published eight issues between 1968 and 1973. Edited by Chicago-based cartoonist Jay Lynch, Bijou Funnies featured strong work by the core group of Lynch, Skip Williamson, Robert Crumb, and Jay Kinney, as well as Art Spiegelman, Gilbert Shelton, Justin Green, and Kim Deitch. Bijou Funnies was heavily influenced by Mad magazine, and, along with Zap Comix, is considered one of the titles to launch the underground comix movement.

== Publication history ==
Bijou Funnies evolved from The Chicago Mirror, an underground newspaper co-produced by Jay Lynch and Skip Williamson, which published three issues in 1967–1968. After seeing Robert Crumb's Zap Comix #1 (published in February 1968), Lynch immediately converted the Mirror from a newspaper to a comic book and, under his own Bijou Publishing Empire produced the first issue of Bijou Funnies in summer 1968 (with Crumb as one of the contributors). Bijou Funnies was produced slightly smaller than standard comics size, measuring 6-1/2" x 8-1/2".

Bay Area publisher the Print Mint published issues #2-4 of the title from 1969 to 1970 (although the Print Mint's logo never appeared on the covers). The midwestern underground publisher Kitchen Sink Press took over Bijou Funnies with issue #5, publishing the title from 1970 to 1973. Indicia in those issues, however, still stated the publisher was the Bijou Publishing Empire, only noting the title was "distributed nationally" by the Print Mint and Krupp Comic Works, respectively.

ComixJoint's M. Steven Fox details what led to Bijou Funnies cancellation:

. . . a confluence of events formed the perfect storm and essentially ended the golden age of underground comics. The most critical event in that storm was the landmark Supreme Court decision on obscenity, which confirmed that obscenity was not protected by the First Amendment and established subjective guidelines for determining what constituted obscene material. [See Miller test] The consequences of that ruling essentially destroyed the head shop distribution system that underground comics relied on to reach their audience.

Bijou Funnies #8 is notable for a number of reasons. The inside front page contained an editorial from Lynch condemning the Supreme Court obscenity ruling. The cover was by Harvey Kurtzman, paying homage to his early work for Mad (but with an R-rated twist), and the stories inside were all parodies by the title's regular cartoonists of each other's characters. In addition, the entire comic was in full-color, which was rare for underground comix of that era.

The British underground publisher Cozmic Comics/H. Bunch Associates reprinted issue #6 of Bijou Funnies in 1974.

Quick Fox/Links Books published a collection titled The Best of Bijou Funnies in 1975, which included work by Lynch, Williamson, Kinney, Green, Crumb, Shelton, Spiegelman, Deitch, Dan Clyne, Jim Osborne, Evert Geradts, and Rory Hayes. The book was re-issued in 1981 by Quick Fox as a "flip book" with The Apex Treasury of Underground Comics', which had originally been published in 1974. In the afterword of the 1975 collection, editor Lynch hints at future issues of Bijou Funnies, noting that "we only do an issue of Bijou Funnies when we feel like doing one", but no further issues of the title were published after November 1973. Eight issues of Bijou Funnies were published in all.

== Characters and contributors ==
Lynch's Nard n' Pat, a human-cat duo, were featured characters in Bijou Funnies. Williamson's Snappy Sammy Smoot made his debut in Bijou Funnies #1 and was a recurring character throughout the title's run. Williamson's Bozo Rebebo made frequent appearances as well. Crumb's Mr. Natural and Joey Tissue were recurring features; Shelton's The Fabulous Furry Freak Brothers appeared in issues #1 and #2.

== Issues ==
1. (Bijou Publishing Empire, Summer 1968) — contributors: Skip Williamson, Jay Lynch, Robert Crumb, Gilbert Shelton, Jay Kinney, Dave Herring (2nd printing by Print Mint)
2. (Print Mint, Sept. 1969) — contributors: Williamson, Lynch, Crumb, Kinney, Art Spiegelman, Jim Osborne, Shelton, John Thompson, Rory Hayes, Paul David Simon ("Paul Filth"), Kim Deitch
3. (Print Mint, Oct. 1969) — contributors: Lynch, Williamson, Roger Brand, Deitch, Kinney, Hayes, Dan Clyne, Crumb, Justin Green
4. (Print Mint, May 1970) — contributors: Crumb, Williamson, Lynch, Deitch, Kinney, Clyne, Green (2nd printing by Kitchen Sink)
5. (Kitchen Sink, Dec. 1970) — contributors: Williamson, Lynch, Osborne, Crumb, Green
6. (Kitchen Sink, Sept. 1971) — contributors: Crumb, Lynch, Green, Williamson
7. (Kitchen Sink, Nov. 1972) — contributors: Williamson, Spiegelman, Lynch, Crumb, Evert Geradts, Green, Clyne
8. (Kitchen Sink, Nov. 1973) — contributors: Harvey Kurtzman (cover), Lynch, Don Stout, Williamson, Dennis Kitchen, Pat Daley, Crumb, Bill Griffith, Deitch, Green, Willy Murphy, Kinney, Ralph Reese
