= Snappy Sammy Smoot =

- The cover of Snappy Sammy Smoot #1 (Kitchen Sink Press, Jan. 1979), illustrated by Skip Williamson.

Publication information
- Publisher: Bijou Publishing Empire, Print Mint, Kitchen Sink Press, Marvel Comics, Fantagraphics
- First comic appearance: Bijou Funnies #1 (Bijou Publishing Empire, 1968)
- Created by: Skip Williamson

In-story information
- Alter ego
- Species: Human
- Partnerships: Ragtime Billy
- Abilities: Refuses to lose his innocence

Snappy Sammy Smoot is an American underground comix character created by Skip Williamson in 1968. A counterculture Candide who never loses his innocence, Snappy Sammy Smoot appeared in his own strips in a number of comix titles, most notably Bijou Funnies, Comix Book, and Blab!. Cultural critic David Manning White wrote about the strip, "But what is . . . interesting about 'Snappy Sammy Smoot' is that it manages to be politically radical at the same time it is satirical and funny", and that it is "one of more highly stylized in the field".

== Publication history ==
Snappy Sammy Smoot first appeared in Bijou Funnies #1 (Summer 1968), and was featured in almost every issue of the title until 1972. After a short hiatus, he was featured in the first two issues of Comix Book, the short-lived attempt by Marvel Comics to get into the underground publishing movement.

In Jan. 1979, Kitchen Sink Press collected all the Snappy Sammy Smoot stories published at that point in a 36-page self-titled one-shot. The character's adventures were again collected in 1988 as part of the Skip Williamson collection The Scum Also Rises: An Anthology of Comic Art, published by Fantagraphics. They were reprinted again in Smoot #1, self-published by Williamson in 1995.

Snappy Sammy Smoot reappeared in 1989 in the annual anthology Blab!, published by Kitchen Sink; and was featured in most later issues through issue #7 (1992).

The character's last major appearance was in the Fantagraphics anthology Zero Zero #9, published in 1996.

== Adaptation ==
The character was brought to life in the 1960s by the actor Carl Reiner on the TV show Rowan & Martin's Laugh-In.

== List of appearances (selected) ==
- "Snappy Sammy Smoot [Visits His Alma Mater]", Bijou Funnies #1 (Bijou Publishing Empire, Summer 1968)
- "Snappy Sammy's Handy Hints No. 1", Bijou Funnies #1 (Bijou Publishing Empire, Summer 1968)
- "Snappy Sammy Smoot Visits the Intergalactic World Brain", Bijou Funnies #2 (Print Mint, Sept. 1969)
- "Snappy Sammy Smoot Gets Assassinated", Bijou Funnies #3 (Print Mint, Oct. 1969)
- "Sammy Gets Fat", Bijou Funnies #4 (Print Mint, May 1970)
- "Why goodness me!... If it isn't Tiajuana Jack, my old friend!", Bijou Funnies #5 (Kitchen Sink Press, Dec. 1970)
- "The Voice of Doom", Bijou Funnies #5 (Kitchen Sink Press, Dec. 1970) — features Ragtime Billy (Snappy Sammy Smoot's Best Friend)
- "Snappy Sammy Smoot Joins the Jesus Revolution", Bijou Funnies #7 (Kitchen Sink Press, Nov. 1972)
- Teen-Age Trash #1 (Adam's Apple Distributing Co., July 1972)
- "Ol' Sam has a Revelation", Comix Book #1 (Marvel Comics, Oct. 1974)
- "Super Sammy Smoot Battles to the Death with the Irrational Shithead", Comix Book #1 (Marvel Comics, Oct. 1974)
- "Sammy Encounters the Black Mafia", Comix Book #2 (Marvel Comics, Jan. 1975)
- "Aw Heck!", Comix Book #2 (Marvel Comics, Jan. 1975)
- "Musical Fruit", Apple Pie #1 (Histronic Publications, 1975) — cameo appearance
- "Gripped by wanderlust I seek the thrill of the open road!", High Times #39 (Trans-High Corporation, Nov. 1978)
- ""Smoot! All things considered, modern humanity doesn't amount to a fart in the wind!" Prime Cuts #2 (Fantagraphics Books, Mar. 1987)
- "Snappy Sammy Smoot — Death Merchant", Blab! #4 (Kitchen Sink Press, Summer 1989)
- "Ah, the vicissitudes of fate. Gunfire, so common in the far-flung hotspots of the world, can cause vexing change..." Blab #5 (Kitchen Sink Press, Summer 1990)
- "Snappy Sammy Smoot Speculates", Blab #5 (Kitchen Sink Press, Summer 1990)
- "Travail, Misery, Disillusionment and Pending Oblivion With Snappy Sammy Smoot", Blab! #6 (Kitchen Sink Press, Summer 1991)
- "Psychobabylon", Blab! #7 (Kitchen Sink Press, Winter 1992)
- "The Cocktail Party", Zero Zero #9 (Fantagraphics, May–June 1996)
