= The Block Island Times =

Newspaper in Rhode Island, United States

- Type: Weekly newspaper
- Format: Tabloid
- Owner: Central Connecticut Communications
- Publisher: Michael E. Schroeder
- Editor: Renée Meyer
- Founded: 1970
- Headquarters: 123 Ocean Avenue, Box 278, Block Island, Rhode Island 02807 U.S.
- OCLC number: 25480512
- Website: blockislandtimes.com

The Block Island Times is an independent weekly newspaper covering the town of New Shoreham, Rhode Island, U.S., coextensive with Block Island. It is the only newspaper published on the island, which is a popular tourist destination in Long Island Sound but has only about 1,000 year-round residents.

== History ==
Dan Rattiner founded The Times as a summer-only paper in 1970. Margaret Cabel Self was the first editor. In 1982, the paper began publishing during non-summer months, and in 1988 became a full-year weekly newspaper.

The newspaper was purchased by Central Connecticut Communications in 2016 from the Lang family.
