= Walter Bowart =

American journalist

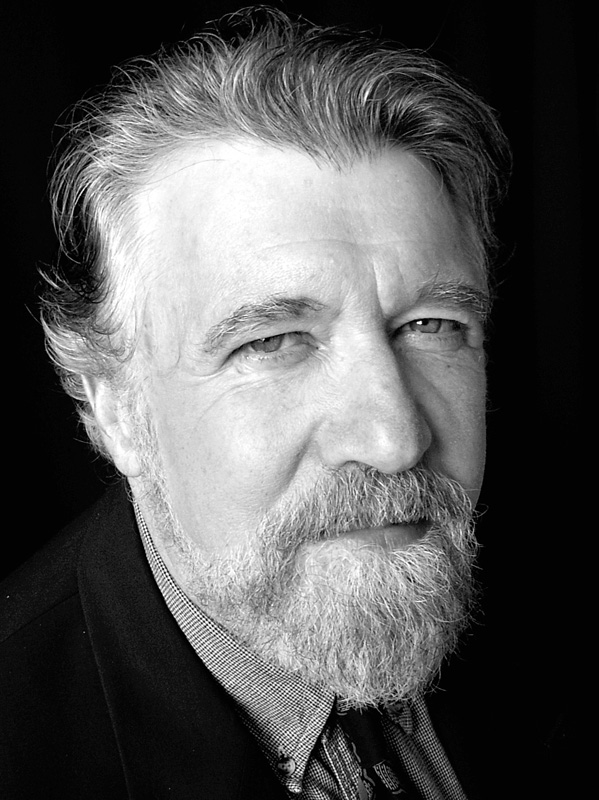
- Born: Walter Howard Kirby; May 14, 1939; Omaha, Nebraska
- Died: December 18, 2007 (aged 68); Inchelium, Washington
- Occupations: Author, Publisher, Editor
- Writing career
- Genre: Non-fiction
- Notable work: Operation Mind Control Samuel L. Lewis
- Movement: 1960s counterculture New Age

Walter Howard Bowart (May 14, 1939 – December 18, 2007) was an American leader in the counterculture movement of the 1960s, founder and editor of the first underground newspaper in New York City, the East Village Other, and author of the book Operation Mind Control.

== Life and career ==
Born as Walter Howard Kirby in Omaha, Nebraska, Bowart was adopted as a newborn by Walter and Fenna Bowart. He was raised in Enid, Oklahoma, and won a McMahon Scholarship in journalism to the University of Oklahoma. In the early 1960s Bowart moved to New York City to pursue his interest in painting, there he met his first wife Linda Dugmore, daughter of abstract expressionist Edward Dugmore, with whom he had his first son Wolfe.

In 1965, Bowart, along with Ishmael Reed, who named the paper, Sherry Needham, Allen Katzman, and Dan Rattiner founded the East Village Other (EVO). EVO offered a newsprint medium for the rants, artwork, poetry and comics of such 1960s icons as Timothy Leary, Allen Ginsberg, Abbie Hoffman, Robert Crumb, Marshall McLuhan, Spain Rodriguez, and The Fugs. In 1966, Bowart testified before the Senate Subcommittee on Juvenile Delinquency about banning LSD. He drew national attention with his recommendations.

Through his connection with ex-Harvard professor Timothy Leary, Walter met his second wife, Peggy Mellon Hitchcock. They moved to Tucson, Arizona in 1968 where Bowart founded Omen Press, a publishing house for metaphysical books. Among other books, Omen Press published This Is The New Age In Person by "Sufi Sam", for which Bowart wrote the foreword. Bowart and Peggy Hitchcock had two daughters, Sophia and Nuria.

In 1973, Bowart located and reconnected with his biological parents, Thomas J. Kirby and Patricia J. Dooley, and discovered he had three younger sisters, Janet, Nancy and Kathy. His adoption had a profound impact on Bowart and he later published various articles under the names of his biological parents.

During this period, Bowart wrote the book that became his seminal work, Operation Mind Control. Published by Dell in 1978 with a foreword by The Manchurian Candidate author Richard Condon, Operation Mind Control was a 317-page investigative report into government mind control through the use of drugs such as LSD, behavior modification, hypnosis, and other "psycho-weapons".

Following a European promotional tour, Bowart moved to Aspen, Colorado, where he continued his research, became a contributor to the Aspen Daily News, and met Margo Jordan, his third wife.

In the early 1980s, Bowart created and published the Port Townsend Daily News in Port Townsend, Washington, where he met and married Rebecca Fullerton and had his fourth child, Wythe. In the late 1980s, Walter moved to Palm Springs, California to become the editor of Palm Springs Life Magazine where he published articles under the name Thomas Kirby, Tom Kirby, and Tom J. Kirby as well as W.H. Bowart.

In Bowart's later years, he researched and wrote prolifically. He created The Freedom of Thought Foundation, a non-profit organization dedicated to the education of the public about mind control. He was a frequently invited guest speaker at forums and conferences around the country.

Bowart died of colon cancer at his sister's home in Inchelium, Washington on December 18, 2007. At the time of his death, Bowart was working on several screenplays and novels, including The Other Crusades, which was about New York City in the early 1960s.
