= Cartoonists' Co-op Press =

Comics publishing cooperative

Cartoonists Co-op Press
- The Cartoonists Co-op Press logo (probably created by Willy Murphy), showing the company's mascot, I. M. Bigg
- Status: Defunct (1974)
- Founded: 1973
- Founders: Kim Deitch; Bill Griffith; Jerry Lane; Jay Lynch; Willy Murphy; Diane Noomin; Art Spiegelman
- Headquarters location: San Francisco
- Publication types: Comics
- Nonfiction topics: Social commentary
- Fiction genres: Underground comix

Cartoonists Co-op Press was an underground comix publishing cooperative based in San Francisco that operated from 1973 to 1974. It was a self-publishing venture by cartoonists Kim Deitch, Bill Griffith, Jerry Lane, Jay Lynch, Willy Murphy, Diane Noomin, and Art Spiegelman. Cartoonist Justin Green's brother Keith acted as salesman/distributor, and the operation was run out of Griffith's apartment.

== History ==
The company released only nine comics in their two years of existence, but published work by a number of notable comix creators in the process. In addition to the founding members, cartoonists published by Cartoonists Co-op Press included S. Clay Wilson, Robert Crumb, Aline Kominsky-Crumb, Trina Robbins, Leslie Cabarga, Justin Green, Ted Richards, Gary Hallgren, Lee Marrs, Jim Osborne, and Spain Rodriguez.

The Co-op was founded as an alternative to the existing underground presses, which were perceived as not being honest with their accounting practices. According to Apex Novelties co-publisher Susan Goodrick, the cooperative was "not a publishing company but a framework to help artists publish their own work. . . . The aim of the Co-op [was] the survival of underground comix through independence of the cartoonists from distributors and publishers."

The Co-op also billed itself as part of the United Cartoon Workers of America (U.C.W. of A.), an informal union organized in 1970 by Crumb, Green, Griffith, Spiegelman, Spain, Roger Brand, Nancy Griffith, and Michele Brand. (The U.C.W. of A. brand appeared on a number of other comix of that era.)

The collective's first release was Jerry Lane's Middle Class Fantasies, published in May 1973; later titles that year were Kim Deitch's Corn Fed Comics #2 (continued from Honeywell & Todd) and Bill Griffith's Tales of Toad #3 (continued from the Print Mint).

In 1974, the press released Jay Lynch's Nard n' Pat #1 (March), the anthology Lean Years (May), S. Clay Wilson's Pork (May), Robert Crumb & Aline Kominsky-Crumb's Dirty Laundry Comics #1 (July), the anthology Sleazy Scandals of the Silver Screen (August), and the anthology Manhunt #2 (continued from the Print Mint; December).

The press was launched on the verge of the 1973 U.S. Supreme Court ruling, in Miller v. California, that local communities could decide their own First Amendment standards with reference to obscenity. In the mid-1970s, sale of drug paraphernalia was outlawed in many places, which caused head shops, where comix were typically sold, to go out of business. After losing their largest distribution network, mail order became the only outlet for underground titles. As a result, many publishers, including Cartoonists Co-op Press, left the comix business.

After the 1974 dissolution of Cartoonists Co-op Press, a number of the publisher's titles were continued by Kitchen Sink Press.

== Titles published ==
- Corn Fed Comics #2 (Dec. 1973) – Kim Deitch
- Dirty Laundry Comics #1 (July 1974) – R. Crumb & Aline Kominsky-Crumb; later continued by Kitchen Sink Press
- Lean Years (May 1974) – anthology about the Great Depression edited by Barry Siegel and Bruce Simon, with contributions from (among others) Kim Deitch, Chris Warner, Trina Robbins, and Leslie Cabarga, and Al Dubin & Harry Warren
- Manhunt #2 (Dec. 1974) – anthology edited by Terry Richards, with contributions from (among others) Trina Robbins, Justin Green, Ted Richards, Leslie Cabarga, Willy Murphy, Gary Hallgren, Sheridan Anderson, and Lee Marrs
- Middle Class Fantasies #1 (May 1973) – Jerry Lane; second issue published by Keith Green Industrial Realities
- Nard n' Pat #1 (Mar. 1974) – Jay Lynch; later continued by Kitchen Sink
- Pork (May 1974) – S. Clay Wilson
- Sleazy Scandals of the Silver Screen (Aug. 1974) – anthology title featuring Jim Osborne, Art Spiegelman, Spain Rodriguez, Kim Deitch, and Bill Griffith; later reprinted by Kitchen Sink
- Tales of Toad #3 (Dec. 1973) – Bill Griffith

== See also ==
- Minicomic Co-ops
- Creator ownership
- Creator's Bill of Rights
