= Dan Rattiner =

American journalist and newspaper publisher

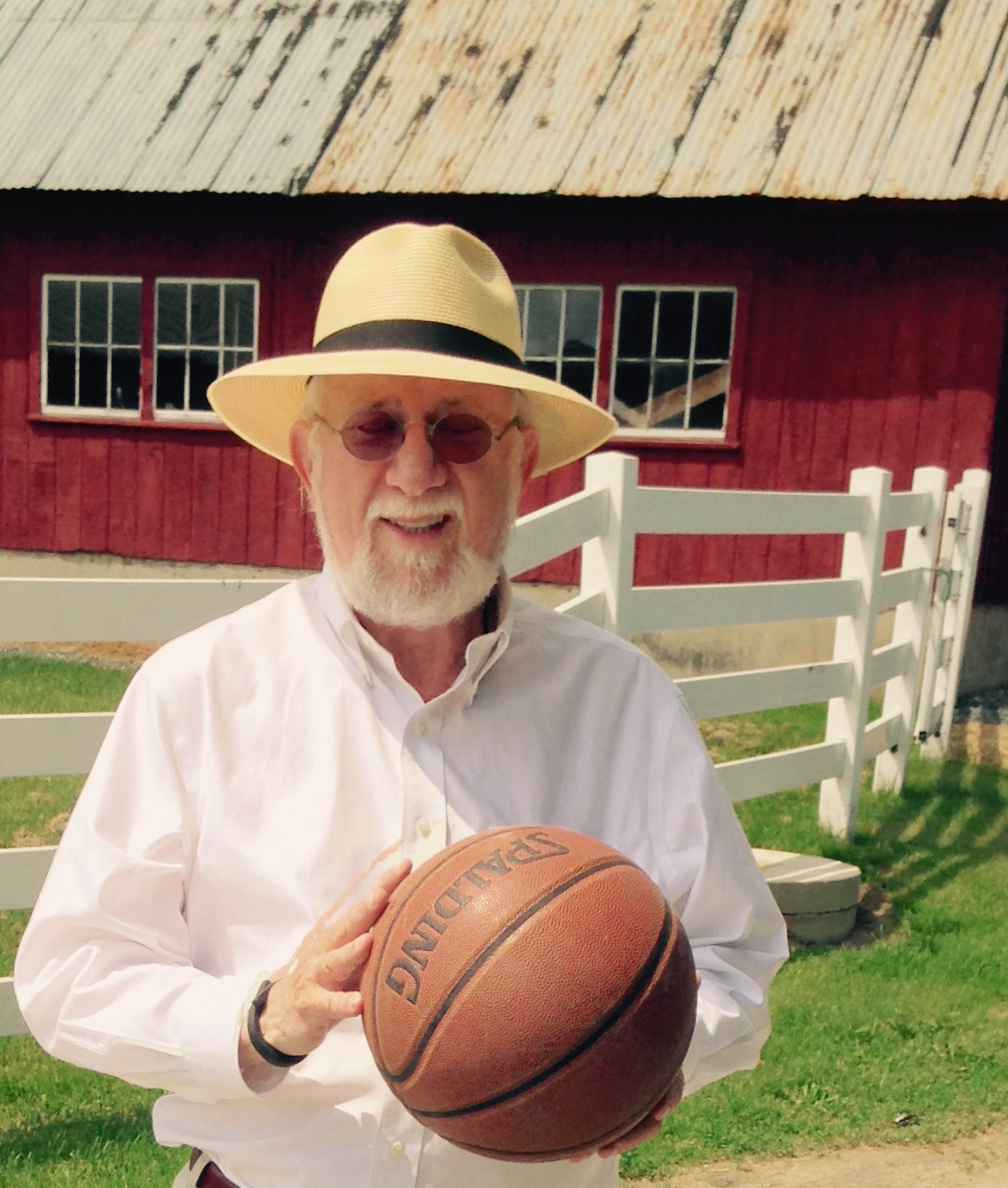
- Rattiner in 2014
- Born: August 15, 1939 (age 86); New York City, New York, U.S.
- Occupations: Journalist, Cartoonist
- Notable credit: Dan's Papers
- Political party: Independent
- Spouse: Chris Wasserstein

Dan Rattiner (born August 15, 1939) is an American journalist and newspaper publisher.

== Biography ==
=== Early life and education ===
Rattiner was born in New York City and raised in Millburn, New Jersey, where he attended Millburn High School. He graduated from the University of Rochester with a B. A. English (1961) and attended Harvard University's Graduate School of Design between 1961 and 1964. While at Harvard, he was a contributor of the Gargoyle Humor Magazine. He also taught Creative Journalistic writing at the Long Island University Southampton campus from 1978 to 1979.

=== Publishing ===
On summer vacation from college, he published the first issue of the Montauk Pioneer on July 1, 1960, in the fishing resort town of Montauk, New York. In 1964, Dan worked in the City Room of the New York Times. In 1965, Rattiner co-founded the Manhattan-based underground newspaper The East Village Other with Walter Bowart, Allan Katzman, and John Wilcock. He also founded The Block Island Times in 1970. Rattiner hosted a weekly radio show, The Hamptons Report, on WQXR for six years during the 1990s.

Rattiner writes more than 300 articles a year on topics including science, humor, sports, world affairs, architecture, history, and scandal. In 1975, Time published a feature story about him entitled "Hoaxer of the Hamptons," in which it covered his penchant for creating East End myths and legends. In 1969 he wrote an article which resulted in demonstrations that saved the Montauk Lighthouse from being torn down by the United States Coast Guard as part of its belt-tightening program, a story that is featured at montauklighthouse.com. Beginning in 1980, Dan expanded the business, licensing editions of Dan's Papers out to resort editors around the country. By 1986 there were dan's Papers Daytona Beach, Maui, Marco's Island (Fl), Nantucket, Martha's Vineyard, Cape Cod and Fire Island in addition to the ones on Block Island and Eastern Long Island. Stories were sent from one Editor to another by MCI mail a precursor to the internet. The Venture did not prosper, however, except for the ones on Long Island and Block Island, all the others had to be abandoned after several years. In 2008, Stony Brook University in Stony Brook Long Island began The Dan Rattiner Collection for his papers, letters, drawings, travel diaries and manuscripts in their climate controlled Whitman Library

In 2011, Rattiner was among the defendants in a libel and defamation suit against the New Yorker magazine and others for a 2010 article in Dan's Papers, partly based on the New Yorker article. The plaintiff, a forensic art analyst, sought $2 million in damages. The case was dismissed in 2013 in the district court. The dismissal was upheld on appeal in 2015.

Rattiner has written 12 books, including the memoir In The Hamptons: My Fifty Years With Farmers, Fishermen, Writers, Artists, Billionaires and Celebrities, published by Random House in 2008 with an introduction by Edward Albee. A chapter of the book was reprinted in its entirety in Newsday. The New York Times and other publications gave “In the Hamptons” good reviews, and it sold well. The Hamptons Too: Further Encounters With Farmers, Fishermen, Artists, Billionaires, and Celebrities, with a foreword by Alec Baldwin, was published by the State University of New York Press in May 2010. A third memoir, "Still in the Hamptons: More Tales of the Rich, the Famous and the Rest of Us," with an introductory quote by Walter Isaacson, was published by the State University Press in July 2012. A fourth memoir "In the Hamptons 4Ever" with a preface by Barbara Goldsmith was published by the New York State University Press in 2015. Other books of his cover history, including "Albert Einstein's Summer Vacation", published by Publishing Tower Press in 1980. It was about Albert Einstein's summer in Southold in 1939 and the famous letter he wrote to President Roosevelt urging the President to fund atomic Energy. In 2021 he authored the book "Hamptons Private" a coffee table book published by Assouline.

Rattiner is also an artist whose pen-and-ink cartoons and sketches appeared in Dan's Papers, Esquire, The Realist, Saturday Review of Literature and Maclean's. His art depicted the East End of Long Island, both its landscape and people ranging from "farmers, movie stars, fishermen and Wall Streeters," as well as broader cultural themes. Rattiner had his first formal exhibition when he had two solos shows at the Ferregut Tower Gallery in Southampton, NY in 2007. He also has shown his work at Winter Tree Gallery in Sag Harbor, New York.

=== Media coverage ===
The Dennis M. Lynch documentary King of the Hamptons features Rattiner. It debuted at the Hamptons International Film Festival in fall 2010. Rattiner has a speaking role in the movie Cyclops, produced by Roger Corman and starring Eric Roberts.

In a segment of "Above and Beyond: Brokers go to great lengths to find the right properties for their clients" in Season 3 of HGTV's Selling New York (aired 1 September 2011), Rattiner was featured as a client seeking an apartment that would accommodate his tortoise (Dribble) and cat. The broker sought to find an apartment meeting Rattiner's preferences on period, location, and views that would also allow pets—including the exotic kind — and accommodate them in a room of their own.

== Personal life ==
According to an interview with Dennis M. Lynch and Rattiner, conducted at the Hamptons International Film Festival and carried on YouTube, Rattiner has been married several times. His fourth wife is Christine (née Parrott) Wasserstein (former wife of Bruce Wasserstein). Rattiner is father to four children from his three previous marriages.
