= Skip Williamson =

American cartoonist

- Born: Mervyn Williamson; August 19, 1944; San Antonio, Texas, U.S.
- Died: March 16, 2017 (aged 72); Albany, New York, U.S.
- Occupation: Cartoonist
- Notable work: Snappy Sammy Smoot, Bijou Funnies "Playboy Funnies"

Mervyn "Skip" Williamson (August 19, 1944 – March 16, 2017) was an American underground cartoonist and central figure in the underground comix movement. Williamson's art was published in the National Lampoon, High Times, the Realist, the Industrial Worker, the Chicago Seed, Encyclopædia Britannica and others. His best-known character is Snappy Sammy Smoot.

== Biography ==
=== Childhood ===
Williamson was born in San Antonio, Texas, but later moved to Lynchburg, Virginia, and then to Canton, Missouri. Williamson's real first name is Mervyn; however when he was a child, he was a bit of a troublemaker, so his grandmother gave him the nickname "Skip" after Percy Crosby's comic strip character "Skippy".

=== First publication ===
Williamson's first published cartoon was in Harvey Kurtzman's Help! magazine in 1961. The cartoon was accepted by then Help! editor Gloria Steinem. The cartoon was of two New Orleans trash cans. One was labeled "Negro Trash" the other "White Trash". Subsequently, comedian Dick Gregory went on The Tonight Show and showed the cartoon on national television, launching Williamson into the mainstream.

=== Underground comix ===
Williamson moved to Chicago in 1967 and almost immediately teamed up with Jay Lynch to publish the underground newspaper The Chicago Mirror. (Williamson and Lynch remained friends for the rest of their lives.) In 1968, Williamson, Lynch, and Robert Crumb rechristened the Chicago Mirror as Bijou Funnies, which became one of the earliest and longest running underground comix titles. Williamson's character Snappy Sammy Smoot became popular enough to appear (played by Carl Reiner) on the 1960s television program Rowan & Martin's Laugh-In. Some years later the Comix Journal wrote:

Skip Williamson is still the quintessential underground comix artist.. . . . Where (Robert) Crumb’s primary comix aim was introspective, . . . Williamson took a broader look, skewering both left-wing trendiness and right-wing over-reaction at a time of much-publicized left-wing trendiness. . . Crumb’s approach may have been more . . . artistically "legitimate," but to those struggling to make sense of the socio-political chaos, Williamson was frequently the funnier."

=== The Chicago 8 ===
Because of Williamson's friendship with Yippie activist Abbie Hoffman, he was allowed into the courtroom where the Chicago 8 trial was being held, where he did sketches of key characters in the trial. Williamson designed the cover of the first printing of Abbie Hoffman's Steal This Book. Hoffman gave Williamson the advance from his book for Williamson to produce a comic that would raise money for the Chicago 8 defense fund. Williamson produced the comic book Conspiracy Capers, which featured the art of Jay Lynch, Art Spiegelman, Jay Kinney, Dan Clyne, Paul David Simon, and others.

=== Later work ===
During the 1970s and 1980s Williamson art-directed and contributed artwork to men's magazines. In 1973 he was art director of Gallery magazine, where he created the “Girl Next Door” concept by publishing snapshots of sweethearts and wives sent in by readers. In 1974 Williamson was the founding art director of Hustler, and in 1976 he joined the staff of Playboy. There he created the popular "Playboy Funnies" section and introduced millions of readers to his characters Neon Vincent and the "postmodern" couple Nell ‘n’ Void.

Williamson designed album covers for blues artists like Albert Collins (Cold Snap, 1986), Koko Taylor (An Audience With the Queen, 1987), Little Charlie and the Nightcats (All The Way Crazy, 1987) and Mudcat (You Better Mind, 2013). For the band Wilderness Road he drew a special comic book, Snuk Comics, to promote them.

In later years Williamson concentrated on producing large-scale canvases depicting political social abomination and political treachery.

=== Death ===
He died at Albany Medical Center at 12:30 pm on March 16, 2017. The official cause of death was renal failure and complications from heart disease and diabetes.

== Exhibitions ==
Williamson's work has been exhibited at the New York Cultural Center (New York City), the Maryland Institute of Design (Baltimore), the Chicago 4 Show (Chicago), the Phoenix Gallery (Berkeley, California), the American Contemporary Graphics Exhibition (a travelling exhibition), the Words & Pictures Museum (Northampton, Massachusetts), the 23rd Century Gallery (Chicago), the Corcoran Gallery of Art (Washington, DC), Lucca Comics & Games (Lucca, Italy), the Tate Modern (London), the La Luz de Jesus gallery (L.A.), Gallery Bink (Portland, Oregon), the Vinson Gallery (Atlanta), and many others. His work was shown throughout Europe in the Comix 2000 traveling exhibition sponsored by the French publisher L’Association.

His art has been auctioned at Sotheby's, Christie's, and Heritage auction houses. Williamson's large-scale canvases depicting political social abomination and political treachery have been exhibited in galleries in New Orleans, Los Angeles, New York City, Philadelphia, Portland, Oregon, and other cities.

In 2000 Williamson exhibited his paintings in a solo show at Atlanta's Eyedrum gallery. Dr. Jerry Cullum, senior editor of Art Papers, wrote in the Atlanta Journal-Constitution:

Williamson knows how to put together a picture, balancing color and skewed perspective as effectively as any realist painter would. . . . He fits perfectly into a type of art championed by Juxtapoz magazine, in which a cartoon style is put to intelligent but outrageous uses. And his cynical view of humanity, worthy of such past satirists as Honoré Daumier, is dead-on regarding the place where most people are. . . . And yet, so much art reveals the places where people never even consider going. But that’s not Williamson’s concern. He reflectively steps on toes, and he rocks.

Williamson's art has been documented by Penguin Books, Brumm Publishing, E.P. Dutton and Company, Studio Vista Publishers, Boston Art & Books, the Graphis Press, Arcanum Press, the School of African Studies — Harvard University, the Designer's Gaukuin College, Northwestern University Press, The New York Times, The Chicago Tribune, the St. Louis Post-Dispatch, The Washington Post, the Milwaukee Bugle-American, the San Francisco Chronicle, the Los Angeles Times, the Detroit Free Press, The Atlanta Journal-Constitution, and many others.

Williamson's comics are included in the permanent collection of the Ryerson & Burnham Libraries at the Art Institute of Chicago.

== Skip Williamson characters ==
- Snappy Sammy Smoot
- Rag-time Billy
- Necropolis Keester
- Neon Vincent
- Nell & Void
