= The Checkered Demon =

- The Checkered Demon, as illustrated by S. Clay Wilson.

Publication information
- Publisher: Print Mint; Last Gasp
- First appearance: Groulish (1967)
- First comic appearance: Zap Comix #2 (Print Mint, Aug. 1968)
- Created by: S. Clay Wilson

In-story information
- Species: Demon
- Partnerships: Star-Eyed Stella, Ruby the Dyke, Lady Coozette
- Abilities: Demonic magical powers

The Checkered Demon is a fictional character created by S. Clay Wilson, one of the leading underground comix artists of the 1960s. The character debuted in 1967 in Groulish magazine; his comix debut was in Zap Comix #2, in 1968.

== Publication history ==
Checkered Demon stories — many of which were one-pagers — ran in many issues of Zap, and then occasional issues of Robert Crumb's Weirdo anthology. Stories also ran in Wilson's own comics, such as Pork (1974), and the Demon's own title (mostly collecting a strip which ran in an alternative weekly), of which three issues were published in the late 1970s.

Checkered Demon stories were collected in the book The Collected Checkered Demon: Volume One, published by Last Gasp in 1998. He also frequently appears in The Art of S. Clay Wilson, published by Ten Speed Press.

He appears as a signature on the cover of Wilson's Grimm (Cottage Classics, 1999).

== Characterization ==
A portly, shirtless being generally seen wearing checkered pants, the Demon emerged from Wilson's experience of watching Federico Fellini's 1965 film Juliet of the Spirits while on LSD. The Checkered Demon's gap-toothed grin was inspired by Mad magazine's mascot Alfred E. Neuman.

The Checkered Demon is frequently called upon to kill the various demented bikers, pirates, and rapists who populate Wilson's universe. The Demon is unbeatable in combat, but prefers to copulate with rapacious women—such as Star-Eyed Stella, Ruby the Dyke, or Lady Coozette—or to sit around drinking Tree Frog beer. He has no concern for human life.

Although the Demon is generally shown as having red skin and black and white checkered pants in color illustrations, Wilson has claimed that the character can actually make himself any color. He generally turns green on Saint Patrick's Day.

== In other media ==
The song "The Checkered Demon", inspired by the character, is part of the American hardcore band AFI's debut album, Answer That and Stay Fashionable (1995).

== List of appearances (selected) ==
- "The Hog Ridin' Fools", Zap Comix #2 (Print Mint, 1968)
- Untitled ["The Fat Demon sitting in the broken throne was chatting with the recently captured female pirate]", Zap Comix #4 (Print Mint, 1969)
- "Thumb and Tongue Tales", parts I and II, Bent (Print Mint, 1971)
- "The Unsolicited Brochure with Dumpy & the Grenade Hearted Broccoli", Zam-Zap Jam (Print Mint, 1974)
- "The Swap", Zap Comix #8 (Print Mint, 1975)
- The Checkered Demon (3 issues, Last Gasp, 1977–1979) — collected from a Checkered Demon comic strip which ran in the L.A. Weekly
- Untitled ["I'm gonna get some pussy and I don't mean maybe, baby!!"], Weirdo #14 (Fall 1985)
- Zap Comix #12 (Last Gasp, 1989)
  - "The Girl"
  - "Picnic in Hell / Devil's Table Top Model #666"
- "Bus Stop! #666", Zap Comix #13 (Last Gasp, 1994)
- "Ruby the Dyke Enters Rotting Zombiesville", Zap Comix #14 (Last Gasp, 1998)
- The Collected Checkered Demon (Last Gasp, 1998)
