= Woody Gelman =

American publisher and cartoonist

- Woody Gelman in 1972
- Born: Woodrow Gelman; June 15, 1915 Chicago, Illinois, US
- Died: February 9, 1978 (aged 62) Valley Stream, New York, US
- Areas: Cartoonist, Publisher
- Notable works: Nostalgia Press; Popsicle Pete; Topps

Woodrow Wilson Gelman (June 8, 1915 – February 9, 1978) was an American publisher, cartoonist, and writer for both animation and comic books. As the publisher of Nostalgia Press, he pioneered the reprinting of vintage comic strips in quality hardcovers and trade paperbacks. As an editor and art director for two-and-a-half decades at Topps Chewing Gum, he introduced many innovations in trading cards and humor products.

Gelman was the co-creator of Popsicle Pete and the co-creator of Bazooka Joe for Topps. He was also a co-creator of Mars Attacks, adapted into the 1996 film by Tim Burton.

Born in Chicago, Illinois, Gelman attended City College of New York, Cooper Union and Pratt Institute before signing on as an assistant animator, in-betweener and scripter with Fleischer Studios in 1939, continuing to write for Famous Studios in 1946.

== Comic books and advertising ==
Gelman was the creator and writer of talking animal feature "The Dodo and the Frog" for DC Comics. His comic book work from 1944 to 1954 included Nutsy Squirrel and other talking animal comic books of the 1940s, including Funny Stuff and Comic Cavalcade. He also wrote and drew the crime story, "The Kid from Brooklyn!", for Heroic Comics #32 (Sept. 1945).

In 1945, Gelman teamed with Ben Solomon to form a New York advertising art service, Solomon & Gelman, to create advertising campaigns involving cartoon characters, such as their Popsicle Pete magazine and ads for the Popsicle company. Topps writer-editor Len Brown recalled how the partnership led to Solomon and Gelman to sign on full-time with Topps:

Woody had a partner in his art business named Ben Solomon who was also out of animation. They both left Paramount about the same time and came back to New York and started the art service, which was called Solomon & Gelman. In fact, they published the boys series books, called Triple Nickel books. They sold for 15¢. Solomon became the art director at Topps, and Woody was the creative director... Actually, he left Paramount after he got involved with trying to unionize the animators and the studio got wind of it and fired whoever was involved. Paramount was down in Florida in those days, so he had moved down there. He came back to New York in 1944 or 1945 and opened a studio, doing art advertising. Popsicles used to feature a kind of Bazooka Joe character in their advertising, Popsicle Pete, and he was in a lot of their ads that were aimed at kids. I think Woody came up with the character. Later he got involved with Bazooka Joe. Through his art service, Woody was approached by various corporations for advertising work. Topps ultimately came to him, and the owner at that time was impressed with Woody and offered him a job. Woody closed down his art studio which he'd operated for seven or eight years... He did a lot of different stuff. Those were just the two that I remember, Bazooka Joe and Popsicle Pete, because they were cartoon characters, but the studio produced a lot of stuff, basic product artwork for advertisements.

== Topps ==
In the autumn of 1951, Gelman and Sy Berger, then a 28-year-old World War II veteran, designed the 1952 Topps baseball card set on the kitchen table of Berger's apartment on Alabama Avenue in the Broadway Junction section of Brooklyn.

From 1953 to the late 1970s, Gelman headed Topps's Product Development Department, working with a staff that included associate creative director Len Brown, gagwriter Stan Hart, visual concept creator Larry Reilly, writer-cartoonists Art Spiegelman and Bhob Stewart, and designer-cartoonist Rick Varesi. Gelman assigned work to numerous freelance cartoonists, including Jack Davis, Mort Drucker, Jay Lynch, Bob Powell, John Severin, Tom Sutton, Basil Wolverton and Wally Wood. Beginning in 1967, Gelman supervised Wacky Packages, one of the biggest fads of the 1970s, and he was responsible for devising many other Topps cards, stickers, posters and humor products over decades.

== Triple Nickel Books ==
Gelman designed and published The Picture History of Charlie Chaplin in 1965

In 1955, the firm of Solomon & Gelman published a series of 64-page juvenile novelettes. Because they retailed for 15 cents, the line was called Triple Nickel Books. The first Triple Nickel Book was very successful, as it was based on the life of Davy Crockett when Crockett was a national fad. At the same time, they published two other Triple Nickel Books about the adventures of the Power Boys, juvenile fiction in the tradition of the Hardy Boys. At least eight Power Boys adventures were published under the pseudonym Arthur Benwood, a name created by combining the first names of Ben Solomon and Woody Gelman. The line includes The Secret of Crazy Cavern (1955), Riddle of the Sunken Ship (1955), Castle of Curious Creatures (1956) and Mystery of the Marble Face (1956). These books are included in the University of South Florida's Special Collections: Tampa Children's Literature Collection. (The Triple Nickel titles are apparently unrelated to Mel Lyle's later and slightly better-known Power Boys series from the mid-1960s.)

== Nostalgia Press ==
After doing a facsimile reprint of the 1945 Little Nemo in Slumberland softcover, with an August Derleth introduction, Gelman began Nostalgia Press in the early 1960s. One of the earliest Nostalgia Press books was The Picture History of Charlie Chaplin (1965), designed by Gelman and showcasing a large collection of rare Chaplin memorabilia. In 1960, he was an associate editor of The American Card Catalog.

The first Nostalgia Press hardcover was Flash Gordon (1967), a reprint of Alex Raymond comic strips, and this book had a follow-up utilizing Flash Gordon proof sheets supplied to Gelman by the artist Al Williamson. Two years later, he compiled art by Charles Dana Gibson for The Best of Charles Dana Gibson (Bounty Books, 1969), with accompanying biographical material and an introduction by Gelman.

Nostalgia Press editors Ron Barlow and Bhob Stewart, along with EC publisher Bill Gaines, selected 23 stories, one previously unpublished, for the full-color EC Horror Comics of the 1950s; with introductions by Stewart and Larry Stark, this oversize (10" x 14") hardcover was published by Nostalgia Press in 1971.

In 1973, Gelman published a collection of Little Nemo strips, first published in Italy. Gelman discovered original strips at a cartoon studio where McCay's son worked in 1966. Many of the original drawings that Gelman recovered were displayed at the Metropolitan Museum of Art under the direction of curator A. Hyatt Mayor.

In the 1970s, Gelman did two collections of Scorchy Smith, and he moved into yet another area, publishing a magazine, Nostalgia Comics, mainly devoted to reprints of comic strips. The first issue of his earlier magazine, Nostalgia Illustrated, was completed in 1967 as a dummy but was never published. Instead, Gelman sold the title and some material to Magazine Management, which did at least a dozen nationally distributed issues in the early 1970s. During the 1970s, he also published his Golden Age of the Comics series, reprinting such strips as Mandrake the Magician, Terry and the Pirates and Thimble Theatre.

Other work by Gelman appears in Wacky Packages, published by Abrams in 2008.

== Films ==
Robert Altman's live-action film Popeye (1980) is adapted from E. C. Segar's Thimble Theatre comic strip. The screenplay by Jules Feiffer was based directly on Thimble Theatre Starring Popeye the Sailor, a hardcover reprint collection of 1936-37 Segar strips published in 1971 by Nostalgia Press.

Tim Burton's film Mars Attacks (1996) was adapted from Topps 1962 Mars Attacks trading card series written by Gelman and Len Brown and illustrated by Wally Wood, Bob Powell and Norman Saunders.

== Awards ==
In 1971, he was honored by the Academy of Comic Book Arts with Recognition for Preservation and Popularization of Comic Art.

Gelman, who lived in Malverne, Long Island, maintained a collection of rare American and European periodicals dating back to the 19th century. His collection of Winsor McCay cartoons is housed in the Billy Ireland Cartoon Library & Museum at Ohio State University. He died February 9, 1978, of a stroke at Franklin General Hospital, Valley Stream, Long Island. His niece Susan Gelman and nephew Andrew Gelman are prominent academics.

== See also ==
- List of Flash Gordon comic strips
