= Shaoul Smira =

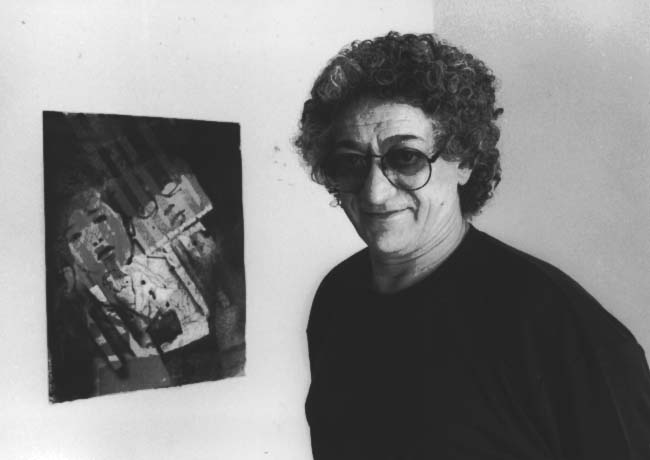
Shaul Smira

Shaul Smira (Hebrew: שאול סמירה; born 1939) is an Iraqi-born Israeli-American painter and printmaker known for his expressive realism and layered compositions.

== Early life and education ==
Shaul Smira was born in Iraq in 1939 and immigrated to Israel in 1951. He studied at the Avni Institute of Art and Design in Tel Aviv from 1959 to 1962. In 1965, he moved to Paris and continued his artistic training at the Académie de la Grande Chaumière.

In 1971, he studied etching and lithography at the Royal Academy of Fine Arts in Antwerp, Belgium. By 1976, he began experimenting with cast paper techniques in Belgium, and in 1985, he attended lithography workshops at Atelier Moretto.

Smira has lived and worked in New York City with his wife Batia Smira since 1978, where he continues to create and exhibit his work internationally.

== Artistic style ==
Smira's work is influenced by Baroque painting, particularly its dramatic compositions and contrasts. His paintings blend expressionism, abstract realism, and figurative elements, often exploring themes of chaos, human emotion, and urban landscapes. He is known for his layering techniques and mixed-media experimentation.

== Exhibitions and collections ==
Smira's work has been displayed in galleries and museums worldwide, including:

- Tel Aviv Museum of Art, Israel
- Museum of Modern Art, New York
- Galerie du Marais, Paris
- Royal Academy of Fine Arts, Antwerp, Belgium
- Art Basel, Switzerland

His paintings are part of private and public collections across Europe, the United States, and Israel.

== Notable works and auction sales ==
Some of Smira's notable paintings include:

- "Figures in Jaffa"
- "Boy with Harmonica"
- "Child and Guitar"
- "Horses"

His works have been sold at auctions for over $20,000 per painting.
