= Gothic Blimp Works =

Comics tabloid

- Robert Crumb cover for Gothic Blimp Works #2 (1969).

Publication information
- Publisher: East Village Other
- Format: Ongoing series
- Publication date: Feb. 1, 1969 to Sept. 1, 1969
- No. of issues: 8

Creative team
- Artist(s): Joel Beck, Vaughn Bodé, Roger Brand, Harrison Cady, Robert Crumb, Kim Deitch, Simon Deitch, Bill Griffith, Larry Hama, Ron Haydock, R. Jaccoma, Baby Jerry, Michael Kaluta, Dick Lupoff, Jay Lynch, George Metzger, Willy Murphy, Hurricane Nancy, Trina Robbins, Spain Rodriguez, Ralph Reese, Joe Schenkman, Art Spiegelman, Bhob Stewart, Steve Stiles, John Thompson, Larry Todd, S. Clay Wilson, Bernie Wrightson
- Editor(s): Vaughn Bodé; Bhob Stewart; Kim Deitch; Van Howell & Joe Schenkman

Gothic Blimp Works, an all-comics tabloid published in 1969 by Peter Leggieri and the East Village Other, was billed as "the first Sunday underground comic paper". During its eight-issue run, the publication displayed comics in both color and black-and-white. The first issue was titled Gothic Blimp Works Presents: Jive Comics.

== Contributors and editors ==
Vaughn Bodé was the founding editor but soon stepped down after the first two issues. At Bodé's invitation, Bhob Stewart became the publication's editor, introducing a line-up of contributing artists and writers that included Larry Hama, Michael Kaluta, Willy Mendes, George Metzger, Ralph Reese, Steve Stiles and Bernie Wrightson. The first two issues also featured work by Bodé, Joel Beck, Roger Brand, Robert Crumb, Kim Deitch, Simon Deitch, Bill Griffith, Ron Haydock, Jay Lynch, Trina Robbins, Spain Rodriguez, Art Spiegelman, John Thompson, Larry Todd, and S. Clay Wilson.

Stewart and Deitch co-edited the fourth issue. With a front cover by Spain Rodriguez and a back cover reprint by Harrison Cady, it featured interior pages by Baby Jerry, Bodé, Brand, Deitch, Hama, Hurricane Nancy, R. Jaccoma, Kaluta, Dick Lupoff, Metzger, Willy Murphy, Reese, Trina Robbins, Joe Schenkman, Stewart, Stiles and S. Clay Wilson. Robert Williams supplied the cover art for issue number 7.

After the fourth issue, Deitch continued as the tabloid's editor. Cartoonists Van Howell and Joe Schenkman were the last co-editors.

== Archives ==
The first six issues are on file at the Syracuse University Library's Special Collections.

== See also ==
- Yellow Dog
