= Bhob Stewart =

American cartoonist

- Born: Robert Marion Stewart; November 12, 1937; Meridian, Mississippi, US
- Died: February 24, 2014 (aged 76)
- Other name: Bobby Stewart
- Occupations: Editor, artist, fan

Robert Marion Stewart, known as Bhob Stewart (November 12, 1937 – February 24, 2014) was an American writer, editor, cartoonist, filmmaker, and active fan who contributed to a variety of publications over a span of five decades. His articles and reviews appeared in TV Guide, Publishers Weekly, and other publications, along with online contributions to Allmovie, the Collecting Channel, and other sites. In 1980, he became the regular film columnist for Heavy Metal.

== Start in publishing and writing ==
Stewart got his start in science fiction fandom, publishing one of the earliest comics fanzines. He published The EC Fan Bulletin, the first EC fanzine, in 1953, and co-edited the Hugo Award-winning science fiction fanzine Xero (1960–1963). He is credited with predicting the arrival of "underground comics" (as a counterpart to underground films) during a panel discussion with Archie Goodwin and Ted White at the New York Comic Con in July 1966.

As there were other science fiction fans at the time also named Bob Stewart, he adopted the spelling "Bhob" for distinctiveness.

== Comics ==
In 1968, Stewart teamed with EC Comics publisher Bill Gaines to choose stories for The EC Horror Library of the 1950s (Nostalgia Press, 1971).

Stewart scripted for animation (Kissyfur) and created the short film, The Year the Universe Lost the Pennant (1961). He edited and designed magazines (Castle of Frankenstein, Flashback), wrote comics for several publishers (Byron Preiss, Marvel, Warren, Charlton, Heavy Metal) and contributed to Jay Lynch's Roxy Funnies (1972). He collaborated with Larry Hama on pages for Gothic Blimp Works, the underground comix tabloid published by the East Village Other, and succeeded Vaughn Bodé as editor, later teaming with Kim Deitch as co-editor of the tabloid.

Stewart devised Wacky Packages and other humor products for Topps, and was the editor of DC Comics' first trading cards series, Cosmic Cards and Cosmic Teams.

His readings of fantasy stories aired on Pacifica Radio's Midnight Chimes, and he contributed to numerous newspapers (The Real Paper), magazines (The Realist, Galaxy Science Fiction) and books (Bare Bones).

His work as an illustrator appeared in Cavalier, The Village Voice, and Venture Science Fiction. In 2010–11, he was a contributor to the Wacky Packages Sketch Cards.

== Teaching and curation ==
In May 1969, Stewart curated the first exhibition of comic book art by a major American museum. This was the "Phonus Balonus Show" at the Corcoran Gallery of Art in Washington, D.C., supervised by museum director Walter Hopps. From 1970 to 1984, he taught at the New England School of Art and Design at Suffolk University.

== Books ==
With Calvin Beck, he co-authored Scream Queens (Macmillan, 1978).

He worked closely with Mad's cartoonists while editing the Mad Style Guide (1994) and Gibson's line of Mad greeting cards (1995).

Time columnist Richard Corliss noted that "Bhob Stewart's handsome, comprehensive Against the Grain: Mad Artist Wallace Wood" (TwoMorrows, 2003) is a "gorgeous book on Wally Wood's art." Stewart worked with Wood for a period starting in the late 1960s. In addition to the many illustrations, this biographical anthology features a selection of articles by artists once associated with Wood's studio. Stewart's biography of Wood can also be read at his blog, Potrzebie, where it is formatted with a different selection of Wood's artwork.

In 2017 and 2018, Fantagraphics Books published The Life and Legend of Wallace Wood ISBN 978-1-60699-815-1, ISBN 978-1-68396-068-3), a revised, expanded, and uncensored version of Against the Grain as a two-volume set of hardcover books: physically larger, in full color, and more in line with Stewart's original concept. It was Stewart's last publishing project, a project he spent more than 30 years on, but he did not live to see it in print.

== Films ==
In 1961, Stewart made a 7-minute experimental film entitled The Year the Universe Lost the Pennant. Combining original material with found footage, both in color and black and white, the film was first screened in 1962.

Originally distributed by the Film-Makers' Cooperative as a "Do-It-Yourself Happening Kit", the work was intended to be screened with an actor responding to the film. As one reviewer noted in his survey of experimental techniques in underground cinema: "Another unconventional device is the dialog between sound track and director in Bhob's Stewart's THE YEAR THE UNIVERSE LOST THE PENNANT which necessitates Mr. Stewart's presence at each showing of the film. So when you rent the film you get Mr. Stewart (live) with it. Even Hollywood cannot beat this one!"

Stewart described the genesis of the film in his notes in the 1967 catalogue from the Film-Makers' Cooperative:

"When I was working on TYTULTPennant in 1961, I was just about to lose faith in my theory of random sometimes-free-associative images and junk the whole project. Then I took mescaline and knew instantly that I was right."

Jonas Mekas rhapsodized about the film in the Village Voice:

"It is a breeze, an antidote. It loosens, it opens things up, it clears the air. You can breathe again. It is a sort of Dada poem, but it is also more than that. Maybe it is, as Ron Rice says, dazendada."

In addition to his own film, Stewart also appeared in a short film by Andy Warhol, and acted in three features by the independent filmmaker Joseph Marzano, including Man Outside, in which he played the starring role.

== Death and legacy ==
After 35 years of living with emphysema, Stewart died on February 24, 2014, in Plymouth, Massachusetts. In October of that year, it was announced that a scholarship fund was to be established in his memory.
