= The Boulevard of Broken Dreams (comics) =

Graphic novel by Kim Deitch

- Date: 2002
- Page count: 160 pages
- Publisher: Pantheon Books

Creative team
- Writers: Kim Deitch, Simon Deitch
- Artists: Kim Deitch, Simon Deitch
- Creator: Kim Deitch
- Editors: Art Spiegelman, Chip Kidd

Original publication
- Published in: Raw vol. 2, #3 (Penguin Books)
- Issues: 1
- Date of publication: 1991
- ISBN: 978-0375421914

The Boulevard of Broken Dreams is a 2002 graphic novel by Kim Deitch (with Simon Deitch), published by Pantheon Books. Featuring Deitch's recurring character, Waldo the Cat, the book is "a twisted allegorical history of the rise and fall of American animation," including the career of cartoonist/animator Winsor McCay; and embodies Deitch's decades-long engagement with the intersection of comics, animation, and artistic authenticity.

Kim Deitch was an original member of the underground comix movement; The Boulevard of Broken Dreams helped bring his work to the mainstream book trade. The book was chosen by Time magazine in 2005 as one of the 100 best English-language graphic novels ever written.

== Publication history ==
The 41-page first part of the graphic novel, co-written and drawn by Kim Deitch and his brother Simon, was published in Raw magazine vol. 2, #3 (June 1991). The same material was republished as a one-shot in 1993 by Fantagraphics.

The full 160-page edition, completed solely by Kim Deitch, was published by Pantheon Books on September 24, 2002.

The graphic novel was translated into French and published by Denoël Graphic as Une tragédie américaine ("An American Tragedy") in 2004.

== Plot ==
The Deitch brothers grew up among animators, and The Boulevard of Broken Dreams spans the period "from 1927 (when theatrical cartoons began to hit their stride) to 1993." The book functions as both a historical reflection and a metafictional commentary on the animation industry, particularly its unsung contributors. The book's layered narrative interrogates artistic identity, memory, and the commercialization of creative work.

The novel’s protagonist, Ted Mishkin, is a fictionalized embodiment of the many real-life animators who worked in obscurity while others took credit for their creations. The plot focuses on Ted, his true love Lillian Freer, and a supporting cast of co-workers, family, and animation fans; as well as Ted's boss Fred Fontaine, and his hero Winsor Newton (a play on words on both Winsor McCay and Winsor & Newton, a brand of art supplies whose ink brushes are popular with cartoonists).

Ted is one of a close-knit group of employees of a minor animation studio, Fontaine Talking Fables, and the story tracks changes in the industry, which include fluctuating popular interest in sequential art as well the Disney empire's efforts to dominate the creative pool, "reveal[ing] how corporate concerns and mass culture took the edge off an art that once had a political and aesthetically experimental keenness." As a result of these factors, the character of Newton is disillusioned with the industry. (Like McKay, in his younger years, the character had a Gertie the Dinosaur-like stage act featuring a mastodon named Milton.)

Ted's experiences are riddled by his personal mental health problems — which extend to hallucinating a malevolent talking cat, Waldo (a recurring character from Deitch's work extending back to the late 1960s), "who's just real enough to drive some of the cartoonists who created him into alcoholism and madness."

== Characters ==
Ted Mishkin
The protagonist, a talented but troubled animator. He later becomes a recurring inmate at the lunatic asylum Berndale Acres.
Lillian Freer
Another animator at Fontaine Talking Fables and Ted's true love. As the story progresses, "she works on experimental films, supports the Disney workers strike, is caught in the anti-communist hysteria and is blacklisted."
Winsor Newton
Fictional animation pioneer based on Winsor McCay.
Fred Fontaine
Owner of the small animation studio Fontaine Talking Fables, , a playful nod to both Aesop's Fables from Paul Terry's studio Fables Pictures, Inc. (later renamed The Van Beuren Corporation), while also alluding to Jean de La Fontaine, who, like Aesop, was a writer of fables.
Al Mishkin
Production manager of Fontaine Talking Fables and Ted's brother.
Reba
Production-line worker at Fontaine Talking Fables and later Mrs. Fred Fontaine.
Nate Mishkin
Nephew of Ted Mishkin.
Waldo the Cat
"[B]oth the subject of Fontaine Fables' increasingly saccharine films, and the supernatural or imaginary 'friend' of Ted and later his nephew Nate Mishkin."
Bert Simon
a "Gene Deitch figure" who becomes "Fontaine’s liberal new manager,... rates Lillian, and applauds her standing up to the notorious Un-American Activities commission."

== Reception ==
In reviewing the book, writer Charles Hatfield observes how Deitch's visual style echoes early animation aesthetics, reinforcing the novel's nostalgic yet critical tone. Hatfield argues that Deitch’s approach to storytelling, with its nonlinear structure and unreliable narrators, mirrors the fragmented and often mythologized history of animation itself. Additionally, the novel serves as a meditation on the loss of artistic control in a corporate entertainment industry, making it a poignant critique of the shifting role of artists within popular media. Ultimately, Hatfield presents The Boulevard of Broken Dreams as a landmark work that not only reflects on the history of comics and animation but also challenges the ways in which artistic legacies are remembered—or forgotten.

Publishers Weekly gave the book a positive review, writing:

It helps to know a bit about animation history to catch some of the jokes... But even without this knowledge, the culture of the studios comes across clearly and the story's complicated chronology is remarkably engaging, albeit weirdly paced. Deitch has an odd, idiosyncratic visual style: his real-world characters are crudely two-dimensional, but they're drawn into distinctly un-cartoony tableaux of squalor and shadow. His funny animal characters, meanwhile, have all the squishable malleability of their silver-screen counterparts with an additional tinge of dark Surrealism.

School Library Journal positively reviewed the book as well, writing:

Using sequential art to create a story about sequential art, Deitch gives readers fact-pickled fiction.... This is a complex story, replete with tawdry affairs, binge drinking, and sanitarium stays, but it is not crude or exploitative of either its characters or its readers. The black-and-white art is giddy with movement and detail, with Waldo waxing beguiling and malignant by appropriate turns in Ted's life of broken dreams. Lillian, who loses one lover in flagrante delicto, ages physically but becomes more beloved by all as the story draws to its Waldo-sealed conclusion. She is a particularly engaging character in a world in which men too often use women as extensions of themselves. A host of American studies issues are addressed here, including the history of the entertainment industry, alcoholism's status in 20th-century America, the lonely life of the creative genius as a cultural motif, and more.

The book was nominated for a 2003 Eisner Award for Best Graphic Album-Reprint. The French translation of the book, Une tragédie américaine, was nominated for an Angoulême International Comics Festival Prize for Best Album in 2005.
