= Kim Deitch =

American cartoonist (born 1944)

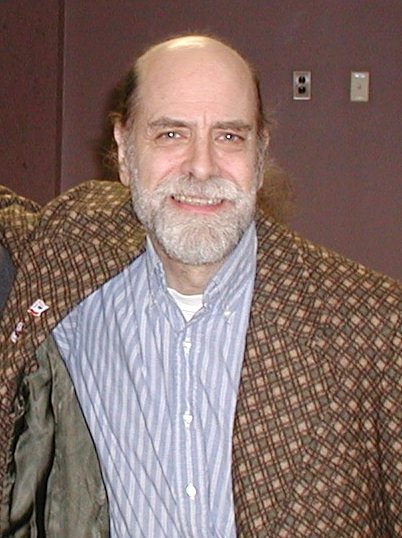
- Deitch in 2004
- Born: May 21, 1944 (age 82) Los Angeles, California, U.S.
- Areas: Cartoonist, Writer, Artist
- Pseudonym: Fowlton Means
- Notable works: The Boulevard of Broken Dreams; Alias the Cat!
- Awards: Eisner Award, 2003; Inkpot Award, 2008; Will Eisner Comic Awards Hall of Fame, 2024
- Partner: Trina Robbins (1969–1970)
- Spouses: Sally Cruikshank (common-law, 1971–c. 1982); Pam Butler (m. 1994–present)
- Children: 1 daughter (with Robbins)

Kim Deitch (born May 21, 1944) is an American cartoonist who was an important figure in the underground comix movement of the 1960s, remaining active in the decades that followed with a variety of books and comics, sometimes using the pseudonym Fowlton Means.

Much of Kim Deitch's work deals with the animation industry and characters from the world of cartoons. His best-known character is a mysterious cat named Waldo, whose appearance is reminiscent of such black cat characters as Felix the Cat, Julius the Cat, and Krazy Kat.

The son of illustrator and animator Gene Deitch, Kim Deitch has sometimes worked with his brothers Simon Deitch and Seth Deitch.

== Biography ==
=== Early life and education ===
Deitch was born in Los Angeles, California. His influences include Winsor McCay, Chester Gould, Jack Cole, and Will Eisner; he attended the Pratt Institute. Before deciding to become a professional cartoonist, Deitch worked odd jobs and did manual labor, including with the merchant marine. Searching for a path, he at one point joined the Republican Party; at another point he became a devotee of Hatha yoga.

=== Career ===
Deitch regularly contributed comical, psychedelia-tinged comic strips (featuring the flower child "Sunshine Girl" and "Uncle Ed, The India Rubber Man") to New York City's premier underground newspaper, the East Village Other, beginning in 1967. He joined Bhob Stewart as an editor of EVO's all-comics spin-off, Gothic Blimp Works, in 1969. During this period, he lived with fellow cartoonist Spain Rodriguez in a sixth-floor walk-up apartment in New York's East Village.

In 1969, he moved to San Francisco, which at that point was the epicenter of the underground comix movement. Deitch was also a publisher, as co-founder of the Cartoonists Co-Op Press, a publishing venture by Deitch, Jay Lynch, Bill Griffith, Jerry Lane, Willy Murphy, Diane Noomin, and Art Spiegelman that operated in 1973–1974.

Deitch's The Boulevard of Broken Dreams, released in 2002, helped bring his work to the mainstream book trade. The book was chosen by Time magazine in 2005 as one of the 100 best English-language graphic novels ever written.

In 2008, the Museum of Comic and Cartoon Art featured a retrospective exhibition of his work.

==== Waldo ====
Deitch's character Waldo the Cat, first created in c. 1966, appears variously as a famous cartoon character of the 1930s, as an actual character in the "reality" of the strips, as the hallucination of a hopeless alcoholic surnamed Mishkin (a victim of the Boulevard of Broken Dreams), or as the demonic reincarnation of Judas Iscariot. He occasionally is even claimed to have overcome Deitch and created the comics himself.

Speaking about Waldo in an interview, Deitch explained:

This Waldo business. Is he a part of me or some sort of alter ego? God, I hope not. I may not be an angel, but I'd hate to think I was as crummy an individual as that creep. I think he shows some characteristics of my brother Simon, who influenced me to go into comics and whom I often collaborated with in earlier times. Simon is a brasher personality than me and shares other attributes with that little blue piece of cheese, Waldo.

Later in the interview, however, Deitch offered this admission:

A key way that art has shaped my life is, it's been the saving of me. Looking myself over, over time, I managed to get rid of many bad habits and, thank God, to replace them with better ones. I would rate myself as kind of a reformed character. You know, that makes me reconsider one of your earlier questions. Maybe there was more of Waldo in me once upon a time.

== Personal life ==
From his first relationship, to cartoonist and author Trina Robbins, Deitch has a daughter, Casey. Through most of the 1970s, Deitch was in an 11-year relationship with animator Sally Cruikshank. He met fellow artist Pam Butler in 1994 and they subsequently married. Of Butler, Deitch says, "Her influence on my work cannot be underestimated. You could say that she has become my very best collaborator."

== Awards ==
Deitch won the 2003 Eisner Award for Best Single Issue for The Stuff of Dreams (Fantagraphics) and in 2008 he was given an Inkpot Award.

In 2024, Deitch was inducted into the Will Eisner Comic Awards Hall of Fame

=== Nominations ===
- 2003 Eisner Award for Best Graphic Album-Reprint (for The Boulevard of Broken Dreams)
- 2004:
  - Ignatz Award for Outstanding Series (for The Stuff of Dreams)
  - Ignatz Award for Outstanding Comic (for The Stuff of Dreams #2)
- 2005 Angoulême International Comics Festival Prize for Best Album (for Une tragédie américaine [The Boulevard of Broken Dreams])
- 2006 Ignatz Award for Outstanding Comic (for The Stuff of Dreams #3)
- 2014:
  - Ignatz Award for Outstanding Graphic Novel (for The Amazing, Enlightening and Absolutely True Adventures of Katherine Whaley)
  - Ignatz Award for Outstanding Artist (for The Amazing, Enlightening and Absolutely True Adventures of Katherine Whaley)
- 2016 Ignatz Award for Outstanding Story (for "Shrine of the Monkey God," from Kramers Ergot #8)

== Bibliography ==
=== Creator series and books ===
Books arranged in order by original published date (publication date shown first, then title, publisher, number of pages, date drawn, and availability). OOP = Out Of Print.

- 1972–1973 Corn Fed Comics (Honeywell & Todd and Cartoonists Co-Op Press, 2 issues)
- 1988 No Business Like Show Business (3-D Zone)
- 1988 Hollywoodland (Fantagraphics, 76 pg) — 1984 story (OOP)
- 1989 Beyond the Pale (Fantagraphics, 136 pg) — 22 stories produced in the period 1969-1984 (OOP)
- 1990 A Shroud for Waldo (Fantagraphics, 158 pg)
- 1993 The Boulevard of Broken Dreams (Fantagraphics, 48 pp.) — 40-page original story published in Raw in 1991 [OOP] — with Simon Deitch
- 1992 All Waldo Comics (Fantagraphics, 60 pg) — 5 Waldo stories published in the period 1969-1988 (OOP)
- 1993 The Mishkin File! (Fantagraphics, 32 pg) original OOP; reprinted in The Boulevard of Broken Dreams (Pantheon 2002)
- 2001 A Shroud for Waldo (Fantagraphics Books, 64 pp.) ISBN 978-1560970811
- 2002 The Boulevard of Broken Dreams (Pantheon, 160 pg)
- 2002 The Stuff of Dreams (Fantagraphics, 136 pg) — original OOP; collected and released by Pantheon as a hardback in 2007 as Alias the Cat!
- 2006 Shadowland (Fantagraphics, 182 pg) — 10 stories (OOP)
- 2007 Deitch's Pictorama (Fantagraphics, 184 pg) — co-authored with Simon Deitch and Seth Kallen Deitch; includes 78-pg "Sunshine Girl"
- 2010 The Search for Smilin' Ed (Fantagraphics, 162 pg) — serialized in Zero Zero beginning in 1999
- 2013 The Amazing, Enlightening and Absolutely True Adventures of Katherine Whaley! (Fantagraphics, 176 pg) Hardback
- 2019 Reincarnation Stories (Fantagraphics, 260 pg) Hardback
- 2026 How I Make Comics (Fantagraphics, 192 pg) Hardback

=== Publications appeared in ===
Lean Years (1974), a Cartoonists Co-op Press one-shot with cover art by Deitch.

- Apex Treasury of Underground Comics, Links Books/Quick Fox, 1974, ISBN 0-8256-3042-8
- Arcade
- Bijou Funnies — issues #2, 3, and 8
- Corporate Crime Comics
- East Village Other
- Gothic Blimp Works
- Heavy Metal
- High Times
- Laugh in the Dark
- LA Weekly
- Lean Years
- Mineshaft Magazine
- Pictopia
- Prime Cuts
- Raw
- Swift Comics (Bantam Books, April 1971) — with Art Spiegelman, Allan Shenker and Trina Robbins
- Southern Fried Fugitives
- Tales of Sex and Death
- Get Stupid
- Webcomic Hurricane Relief Telethon
- Weirdo
- Young Lust
- Zero Zero

=== Animation ===
- Easy Groove ID, Nickelodeon, 1987
- Farmer & Cat ID, MTV, 1996
- "Dallas", Venue Songs, They Might Be Giants, 2005
