= Jay Lynch =

American cartoonist (1945–2017)

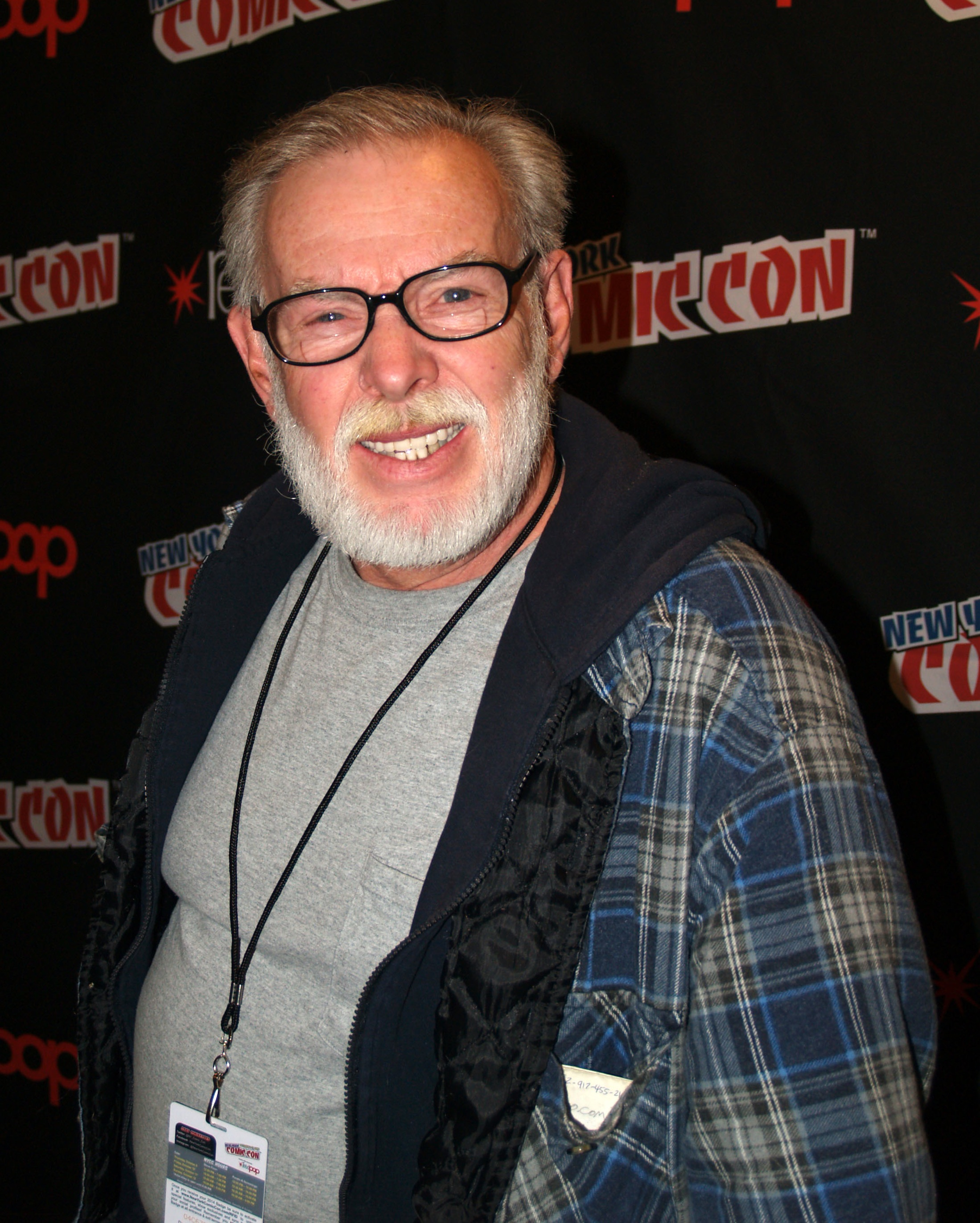
- Lynch at the 2014 New York Comic Con
- Born: Jay Patrick Lynch; January 7, 1945 Orange, New Jersey, U.S.
- Died: March 5, 2017 (aged 72) Candor, New York, U.S.
- Areas: Cartoonist, Writer, Editor
- Pseudonyms: Jayzee Lynch; Ray Finch
- Notable works: Bijou Funnies; Phoebe and the Pigeon People; Nard n' Pat; Bazooka Joe

Jay Patrick Lynch (January 7, 1945 – March 5, 2017) was an American cartoonist who played a key role in the underground comix movement with his Bijou Funnies and other titles. He is best known for his comic strip Nard n' Pat and the running gag Um tut sut. His work is sometimes signed Jayzey Lynch. Lynch was the main writer for Bazooka Joe comics from 1967 to 1990; he contributed to Mad, and in the 2000s expanded into the children's book field.

== Biography ==
Lynch was born in Orange, New Jersey, and grew up in Belmar, New Jersey, later moving to Florida.

At age 17, Lynch moved to Chicago in 1963, where he attended art school at night and worked a string of odd jobs, including running a service bar for the improv comedy troupe Second City.

=== Comix ===
Lynch's first published cartoons were for the Roosevelt University humor magazine, the Aardvark; he also contributed to a wide range of college humor publications. Lynch soon graduated to professional humor magazines like Sick, Cracked, and The Realist; and when the underground press movement started in the mid-1960s he became a regular contributor to papers like the Chicago Seed, and (thanks to the Underground Press Syndicate) the Berkeley Barb, the East Village Other, Fifth Estate, and others. Beginning in 1967, Lynch became the lead writer for the Bazooka Joe comics, a gig he kept until 1990.

In 1967, Lynch teamed up with fellow Chicago transplant Skip Williamson to publish the underground newspaper The Chicago Mirror, which in 1968 after three issues was renamed and reformatted into the underground comix anthology Bijou Funnies. As Ben Schwartz writes, Bijou Funnies "... would become Chicago's answer to Robert Crumb's Zap Comix, ... with early work by Lynch, Spiegelman, Gilbert Shelton and Skip Williamson." Bijou Funnies was heavily influenced by Mad magazine, and, along with Zap, is considered one of the titles to launch the underground comix movement. Bijou Funnies lasted 8 issues (from 1968 to 1973); a selection of stories from Bijou Funnies were collected in 1975 in the book The Best of Bijou Funnies (Quick Fox/Links Books).

Lynch's best known comic book stories involve the human-cat duo Nard n' Pat, recurring characters in Bijou Funnies. Nard is a bald middle-aged man of conservative tendencies, and Patrick is his more "hip" talking cat. Nard n' Pat were featured in two issues of their own comic, the first one published by Cartoonists Co-Op Press in 1974 (Cartoonists Co-Op Press was a self-publishing venture by Lynch, Kim Deitch, Bill Griffith, Jerry Lane, Willy Murphy, Diane Noomin, and Art Spiegelman that operated in 1973–1974), and the second issue published by Kitchen Sink Press in 1981.

The weekly comic strip Phoebe and the Pigeon People, by Lynch and illustrator Gary Whitney, ran in the Chicago Reader for 17 years in the late 1970s and 1980s; Kitchen Sink Press published 3 issues of a Phoebe & the Pigeon People comic book collecting material from the strip in 1979–1981. Up until his death, Lynch had scans of more than 500 editions of the strip ready for any publisher who saw the potential of a Phoebe and the Pigeon People book.

=== Trading cards ===
Beginning in 1968, Lynch became a major contributor to Topps' Wacky Packages and Garbage Pail Kids, plus other Topps humor products. In 2002, he recalled his creative working methods and procedures with Len Brown and others at the Topps' Product Development Department:

I would get a phone call from Len Brown or Art Spiegelman telling me it was time for me to do some roughs for a new series of Wacky Packages. I would usually submit a dozen roughs at a time. Len would tell me, usually on the phone, which food conglomerates I could not parody, based on cease and desist letters from prior series. I had a master list of taboo companies – and this would be added to, by phone, until a new master list would be compiled and sent to me. In those days I had a pretty good working knowledge of who made what, though. So I would give Len a verbal list of maybe 20 or so products, of which he would pick a dozen. Sometimes he would suggest products, sometimes he would come up with the gag title on the phone, and I would add to it on the rough. Sometimes Spiegelman, or Bhob Stewart, or Woody Gelman would phone the assignment to me. In the 80s, Mark Newgarden would phone the assignment to me. In the 90s Ira Friedman would phone the assignment to me. But mostly it would be Len. I think in the 60s I got $8 a rough. By the 70s it had gone up to $20 a rough. By the 80s it was $125 a rough, and so on. What I got for a rough always remained the same amount in actual buying power. It has gone up with inflation, though. One rough pays about the same as a week's worth of groceries. Always has – and always will. Anyway – after I had some idea of the initial dozen products that I would parody, I would go to the supermarket and buy these products. Sometimes I would get ideas for additional products as well – and Topps would reimburse me for this cost of the actual products when I would send them the receipt along with my bill, which I would enclose with each batch of roughs. These roughs were done in India ink and colored with Magic Markers. I would just send them in by regular mail, and I didn't bother to retain Xerox copies of them until the mid-1970s when the drugstore down the block from my house installed a pay Xerox machine. I was living in Chicago then. I would only go to Brooklyn to meet with the Topps guys once every six months or so. Usually this was to work on a vast variety of other Topps and Bazooka projects. Wacky Packages was just one of the countless series in development then, only one in ten of which would ever see the light of day.

=== Mad, children's books, Mineshaft, and other work ===
Otto's Orange Day, written by Lynch and illustrated by Frank Cammuso

During the 1990s, he began writing for Mad, and he also devised products for Mad merchandising.

Lynch and his wife Carole Sobocinski collaborated in the early 2000s on a series of fine art paintings, selling them under the joint pseudonym "Kringo."

Lynch wrote two children's books for Toon Books in 2008–2009: Otto's Orange Day, illustrated by Frank Cammuso, and Mo and Jo Fighting Together Forever, illustrated by Dean Haspiel.

Jay Lynch self-portrait for The Comics Journal #114 (February 1987)

Jay Lynch was a regular contributor to Mineshaft magazine from 2006 to 2018 with his work appearing in issues 18, 19, 20, 21, 22, 23 (front cover), 24, 25, 30, 31 (front cover), 32, 33, and Mineshaft #35, with front cover art by Robert Crumb, which was the "Jay Lynch Memorial Issue".

== Personal life and death ==
Lynch's first wife Jane Lynch was an occasional contributor to comics in the early 1970s, including pieces she wrote for Arcade #3 (an interview with Bill Griffith's character Zippy the Pinhead) and Skywald Publications's Psycho #17 (a story called "The Lunatic Class Of '64," illustrated by Emilio Bernardo). Lynch and his second wife, artist Carole Sobocinski, were married for twenty years.

Lynch died from complications of lung cancer on March 5, 2017, in Candor, New York.

== Awards ==
In June 2009, Jay Lynch was nominated for a Harvey Award in the category of "Best Cover Artist" for his Mineshaft #23 cover.

== Bibliography ==
=== Underground comix ===
Solo series and as editor:

- Bijou Funnies #1–8 (Bijou Publishing Empire, Print Mint, Kitchen Sink, 1968–1973) — editor, contributor
- Don Dohler's ProJunior (Kitchen Sink, Oct. 1971) — editor, contributor
- Turned on Cuties (Golden Gate Publishing Company, 1972) — editor, contributor
- Roxy Funnies (Head Imports, 1972) — editor, contributor
- Purple Cat (Adam's Apple Distributing, 1973) — editor, contributor
- Nard n' Pat #1-2 (Cartoonists Co-Op Press, 1974; Kitchen Sink, 1981) — Lynch solo series
- Phoebe & the Pigeon People #1–3 (Kitchen Sink, 1979–1981) — collection of material from Phoebe and the Pigeon People strip with Gary Whitney (17-year run in the Chicago Reader)

As contributor:

- Gothic Blimp Works #1–2 (1969)
- Radical America Komiks (Radical America, Jan. 1969)
- Bogeyman #2 (San Francisco Comic Book Company, 1969)
- Bogeyman #3 (Company & Sons, 1970)

=== Children's books ===
As writer:

- Otto's Orange Day (Toon Books, 2008) — illustrated by Frank Cammuso
- Mo and Jo (Toon Books, 2009) — illustrated by Dean Haspiel
