= S. Clay Wilson =

American cartoonist (1941–2021)

- Born: July 25, 1941 Lincoln, Nebraska, U.S.
- Died: February 7, 2021 (aged 79) San Francisco, California, U.S.
- Areas: Cartoonist, Illustrator, Painter
- Pseudonyms: Crank Collingwood; Hank "Elephant Boy" Longcrank; Howard Arnherst; Howard Crankwood; Marquis Von Crank
- Notable works: The Checkered Demon; Zap Comix
- Awards: Will Eisner Award Hall of Fame, 1992
- Spouse: Lorraine Chamberlain (m. 2010)

Steve Clay Wilson (July 25, 1941 – February 7, 2021) was an American underground cartoonist and central figure in the underground comix movement. Wilson attracted attention from readers with aggressively violent and sexually explicit panoramas of lowlife individuals, often depicting the wild escapades of pirates and bikers. He was an early contributor to Zap Comix.

A striking feature of Wilson's work is the contrast between the literate way in which his characters speak and think and the depraved violence in which they engage. As James Danky and Denis Kitchen wrote in their book, Underground Classics, "He astonished and sometimes frightened his fellow cartoonists, though they saw it as pushing if not eviscerating the boundaries of taste. More than anyone, Wilson defined the boundaries of the medium."

The artist and characters sometimes exhibit a playful attitude toward violence, for example getting tired of fighting and agreeing to have sex instead of continuing a battle. Wilson's later work became more ghoulish, featuring zombie pirates and visualizations of Our Lady of Guadalupe as a rotting vampire mother. In many respects, however, his work remained consistent with his emergence in the 1960s. In contrast with the many counterculture figures who moderated their more extreme tendencies and successfully assimilated into the mainstream of commercial culture, Wilson's work remained troubling to mainstream sensibilities and defiantly ill-mannered.

== Early life ==
Wilson was born on July 25, 1941, in Lincoln, Nebraska to Lydia (née Lewis) and John William Wilson. His mother was a medical stenographer, while his father was a machinist. He attended the University of Nebraska and later trained as a medic in the United States Army.

He lived in Lawrence, Kansas and held odd jobs before moving to San Francisco in 1968.

== Career ==
=== Early career ===
Wilson's first published work was in The Screw, an underground newspaper in Lawrence, Kansas, which was soon followed by drawings for Grist magazine, a poetry journal published by John Fowler. (According to Charles Plymell, an editor of Grist, Wilson's first published work was in 1966 in Grist #7 and then in Grist #9, also from that same year.) The first appearance of the Checkered Demon is said to have been in an ad in a later issue of Grist. Wilson's portfolio was printed the following year in 1967, with subsequent printings later on in comic book form.

=== Underground comix ===
Cover of Zap Comix #9. Only the covers of Zap were in color.

In California, Wilson met up with Charles Plymell, who was publishing Robert Crumb's Zap Comix. Wilson needed little persuasion to contribute to Zap. Wilson began collaborating with Crumb in late 1967, and all issues of Zap comix starting with #2 contain his work. It was in Zap #2 that Wilson widely debuted his most famous character, The Checkered Demon, a portly, shirtless being generally seen wearing checkered pants.

Wilson was also a frequent early contributor to another underground project, the Yellow Dog tabloid anthology. Wilson's work was featured in all three issues of The Rip Off Review of Western Culture, published in 1972. The third issue (Nov./Dec. 1972) featured an extensive interview with Wilson by Robert Follett, the publication's editorial director. Wilson was also a frequent contributor to Arcade, edited by Art Spiegelman and Bill Griffith; as well as Weirdo, Crumb's post-underground anthology published in the 1980s and early 1990s. Wilson's underground comix work was praised by such counterculture icons as William S. Burroughs and Terry Southern.

=== Painting ===
The Art of S. Clay Wilson, published in 2006 by Ten Speed Press, covers his prints and paintings as well as his comics work.

=== Book Illustrations ===

His illustrations for Burroughs' Cities of The Red Night and The Wild Boys were published in German editions by 2001 Publishing. In 1994, he began interpreting classic children's stories, illustrating Hans Christian Andersen and the Brothers Grimm, as he explained to interviewers Jon Randall and Wesley Joost:

I did a children's book entitled Wilson's Andersen. I always wanted to be a children's book illustrator way back when, but I took some LSD and took a left turn graphically. We got William Burroughs to write us a little blurb on the back, but they misspelled Burroughs! How could they do that! The stories are pretty lugubrious—"The Rose Elf", for instance—where the woman is kissing the "cold blue dead lips" of her lovers' head. Later versions leave all this stuff out. Disney takes a great old story and they "bleach" it—as they used to say about music. To make it palatable and generic. These stories are supposed to scare the shit out of little kids so they'll eat all their broccoli.

The stories in Wilson's Grimm (Cottage Classics, 1999) are "Snow White", "The Spirit in the Bottle", "The Valiant Little Tailor", "The Devil with the Three Gold Hairs", "Hansel and Gretel", "Bearskin" and "The Master Thief".

== Brain injury and later life ==
On November 1, 2008, Wilson suffered a severe brain injury. After attending the Alternative Press Expo in San Francisco and drinking throughout the day, Wilson left the house of a friend and was found by two passersby, face down and unconscious between parked cars. Among his injuries were a fractured neck and left orbital bone; it is not known if he was assaulted or passed out and fell.

After a week in intensive care, Wilson was put on an accelerated therapy program, but he still showed major difficulty in summoning words, a common form of aphasia following a trauma of this sort. He had recovered enough to write his own signature in the first week of December, but continued to require hospitalization as of the end of December 2008, when a benefit was held to assist with his medical costs. Another benefit was held in Hollywood in March 2009. Wilson returned home in November 2009, able to draw well and speak a little but still requiring special care.

He married Lorraine Chamberlain, with whom he had been living for ten years, on August 10, 2010.

In early 2012, he was rushed to the hospital with a buildup of fluid on his brain. After having brain surgery and spending three weeks in rehab, he developed a blood clot in his leg that required another three months in a facility on bed rest, followed by rehabilitation. After that incident, he never fully regained his strength, and suffered further from dementia. He could no longer draw except for the odd face or cluster of geometric shapes or letters. He rarely spoke, but he could answer questions. He appeared to understand much of what was said to him, although he could not actively participate in a conversation.

== Death ==
Wilson died at his home in San Francisco on February 7, 2021. His health had deteriorated following severe injuries to the brain and the neck, from twelve years before, sustained from "either a fight or a fall."

== Tributes ==
Wilson's artistic audacity has been cited by Robert Crumb as a liberating source of inspiration for Crumb's own work. Recalling when he first saw Wilson's work (in about 1968) Crumb said, "The content was something like I'd never seen before, anywhere, the level of mayhem, violence, dismemberment, naked women, loose body parts, huge, obscene sex organs, a nightmare vision of hell-on-earth never so graphically illustrated before in the history of art.... Suddenly my own work seemed insipid..."

"He showed us we had been censoring ourselves," said Zap cohort Victor Moscoso. "He blew the doors off the church. Wilson is one of the major artists of our generation." Referring to his and the Zap crew's status in art circles, Wilson himself said, "If you're not good enough to be a cartoonist, maybe you can be an artist."

== S. Clay Wilson characters ==
"Tree Frog Beer" is the drink of choice for many of these characters.

- The Checkered Demon
- Star-Eyed Stella
- Captain Pissgums and his Pervert Pirates
- Ruby the Dyke
- Hog Riding Fools (motorcycle gang)
- Club Choad Charley — a member of the Hog Riding Fools
- Lester Gass the Midnight Misogynist

== Awards ==
- 1992 The Will Eisner Award Hall of Fame

== Bibliography ==
=== As a contributor ===
- Zap Comix — issues #2–16 (1968–2014)
- Yellow Dog — issues #7–14 (1968–1969)
- Gothic Blimp Works — issues #1–2, 4 (1968)
- San Francisco Comic Book — issues #1–2 (1970)
- The Organ (1970–1971)
- The Rip Off Review of Western Culture — all three issues (1972)
- Arcade — issues #1, 3–5 (1975–1976)
- Weirdo — issues #13–15, 17, 19, 24, 27 (1985–1990)
- Strip AIDS (1987)
- The Narrative Corpse — 3 panels (1995)
- Graphic Classics 4: H. P. Lovecraft — adaptation (2002)
- The Graphic Canon, Volume 2 — adaptation (2012)

=== Books and collections ===
- Bent (1 issue, Print Mint, 1971)
- Pork (1 issue, Cartoonists Co-Op Press, 1974)
- The Checkered Demon (3 issues, Last Gasp (publisher), 1977–1979)
- (as illustrator) Burroughs, William S. The Wild Boys (Zweitausendeins, 1980) — in German
- (as illustrator) Burroughs, William S. Cities of The Red Night (Zweitausendeins, 1982) — in German
- Wilson's Andersen: Seven Stories by Andersen (Cottage Classics, 1994)
- Wilson's Grimm (Cottage Classics, 1999)
- The Art of S. Clay Wilson (Ten Speed Press, 2006)
- Checkered Demon Anthology, Vol. 1 (Last Gasp, 2015)
- Dear Charlie: Letters to Charles Plymell (Water Row Press, 2021)
