= East Village Other =

Former underground newspaper in New York City

East Village Other EVO
- East Village Other (April 16 – May 1, 1967)
- Type: Biweekly newspaper
- Founder(s): Walter Bowart, Allen Katzman, Sherry Needham, Ishmael Reed, John Wilcock
- Publisher: Walter Bowart
- Editor-in-chief: John Wilcock
- Founded: October 1, 1965; 61 years ago in New York City
- Ceased publication: March 1, 1972; 54 years ago
- Headquarters: New York, NY
- Circulation: 65,000 (1970)
- ISSN: 0012-8562
- Free online archives: voices.revealdigital.org

Allen Katzman, Bill Beckman and Walter Bowart in the EVO office.

The East Village Other (often abbreviated as EVO) was an American underground newspaper in New York City, issued biweekly during the 1960s. It was described by The New York Times as "a New York newspaper so countercultural that it made The Village Voice look like a church circular".

Published by Walter Bowart, EVO was among the first countercultural newspapers to emerge. EVO was one of the founding members of the Underground Press Syndicate, a network that allowed member papers to freely reprint each other's contents.

The paper's design, in its first years, was characterized by Dadaistic montages and absurdist, non-sequitur headlines, including regular invocations of the "Intergalactic World Brain." Later, the paper evolved a more colorful psychedelic layout that became a distinguishing characteristic of the underground papers of the time.

EVO was an important publication for the underground comix movement, featuring comic strips by artists including Robert Crumb, Kim Deitch, Trina Robbins, Spain Rodriguez, Gilbert Shelton and Art Spiegelman, before underground comic books emerged from San Francisco with the first issue of Zap Comix.

== Publication history ==
The East Village Other was "formed as a stock company, with Walter Bowart, Allen Katzman and Dan Rattiner each owning three shares", co-founded in October 1965 by Walter Bowart, Ishmael Reed (who named the newspaper), Allen Katzman, Dan Rattiner, Sherry Needham, and John Wilcock. It began as a monthly and then went biweekly.

Starting in 1969, Coca Crystal would write about politics, women's issues, and personal events for the East Village Other, many of which earned her the title "slumgoddess".

The paper published another short-lived spin-off title, Kiss, a sex-oriented paper that was designed to compete with Al Goldstein's tabloid Screw. There were several other spin-off titles published at the same time, including Gay Power (a New York–centric gay liberation paper which survived for about a year), and a brief-lived astrology paper.

In 1968, Bowart departed, moving to Tucson, Arizona, where he founded Omen Press, publishing metaphysical books.

In 1970, EVO had a circulation of 65,000 copies.

As 1971 drew to a close, publication of EVO became more and more sporadic. It faced mounting financial difficulties, along with increasing staff losses, and the paper ceased publication completely in March 1972.

== Comics ==
Early EVO issues featured the work of Bill Beckman, Shelton, and Rodriguez, soon adding other artists. The popularity of these strips led to the publication of separate comics tabloids, beginning with Zodiac Mindwarp by Rodriguez.

Comics historian Patrick Rosenkranz recalled his reaction to EVO:

I'd never seen a publication like this before. It was full of wild accusations and bawdy language and doctored photographs. It had President Johnson's head in a toilet bowl. It had naked Slum Goddesses, truly bizarre personal ads, and a whole different slant on the anti-war movement than my hometown paper upstate. But best of all, it had the most outrageous comic strips. The continuing saga of Captain High; the psychedelic adventures of Sunshine Girl and Zoroaster the Mad Mouse; Trashman offing the pigs and scoring babes left and right. While I enjoyed many aspects of EVO, I liked the comics the most. Bill Beckman was one of the first cartoonists with his counterculture crusader Captain High, whose main mission was to get high and stay high. Beckman didn't draw very well, but EVO's readership could relate to the premise. Beckman contacted his buddy Gilbert Shelton from back at the University of Texas at Austin, who mailed in an occasional strip called Clang Honk Tweet!; Hurricane Nancy Kalish contributed a spacey, Aubrey Beardsley-style comic called Gentle's Tripout. Others came and went without much notice until Walter Bowart commissioned Manuel "Spain" Rodriguez to draw a 24-page all-comic tabloid, which he published as Zodiac Mindwarp in 1966.

During 1969, EVO published eight issues of Gothic Blimp Works, an all-comics tabloid with some color printing, billed as "the first Sunday underground comic paper". Vaughn Bodé was the founding editor, with early issues featuring work by Bodé, Crumb, Deitch, Robbins, Rodriguez, Spiegelman, Joel Beck, Roger Brand, Ron Haydock, Jay Lynch, Larry Hama, Michael Kaluta, George Metzger, Ralph Reese, Steve Stiles, Robert Williams, S. Clay Wilson, Bernie Wrightson and Bhob Stewart (who became Gothic Blimp Works' second editor).

== Music ==
In 1966, the newspaper released the various artists compilation album The East Village Other [aka Electric Newspaper] which featured the earliest recording of New York's the Velvet Underground. The track was entitled "Noise" and had originally been recorded by violist John Cale in 1964.

== See also ==
- List of underground newspapers of the 1960s counterculture
