= Bill Griffith =

American cartoonist (born 1944)

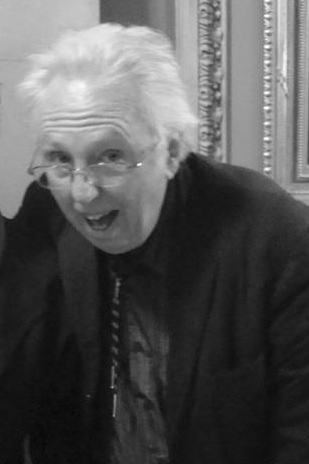
- Griffith in 2012
- Born: William Henry Jackson Griffith; January 20, 1944 (age 82) Brooklyn, New York City, New York, U.S.
- Area: Cartoonist
- Pseudonym: Griffy
- Notable works: Young Lust; Arcade; Zippy the Pinhead; Invisible Ink; Nobody's Fool
- Awards: Inkpot Award (1992) Reuben Award (2022)
- Spouse: Diane Noomin (m. 1980; died 2022)

Signature
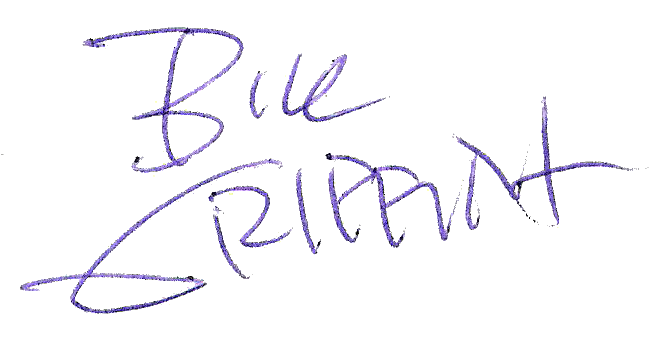

William Henry Jackson Griffith (born January 20, 1944) is an American cartoonist who signs his work Bill Griffith and Griffy. He is best known for his surreal daily comic strip Zippy. The catchphrase "Are we having fun yet?" is credited to Griffith.

Over his career, which started in the underground comix era, Griffith has worked with the industry's leading underground/alternative publishers, including Print Mint, Last Gasp, Rip Off Press, Kitchen Sink, and Fantagraphics Books. He co-edited the notable comics anthologies Arcade and Young Lust, and has contributed comics and illustrations to a variety of publications, including National Lampoon, High Times, The New Yorker, The Village Voice and The New York Times.

== Early life, family and education ==
Born in Brooklyn, New York City, New York, Griffith grew up in Levittown on Long Island. He is the great-grandson and namesake of the photographer and artist William Henry Jackson (Jackson died at age 99 just two years before Griffith was born).

One of Griffith's neighbors was science fiction illustrator Ed Emshwiller, whom Griffith credits with pointing him toward the world of art. Griffith, his father and his mother all served as models for Emshwiller at one time or another; a very young Griffith appears (along with his father) on the cover of the September 1957 issue of Science Fiction Stories.

For over a decade, starting in 1957, Griffith's mother Barbara had an affair with cartoonist Lawrence Lariar; this formed the basis of a 2015 graphic novel by Griffith.

While attending Brooklyn's Pratt Institute in 1963, Griffith saw a screening of the 1932 Tod Browning film Freaks. As he said in a later interview, "I was fascinated by the pinheads in the introductory scene and asked the projectionist (who I knew) if he could slow down the film so I could hear what they were saying better. He did and I loved the poetic, random dialog. Little did I know that Zippy was being planted in my fevered brain."

Griffith graduated with an Associate of Applied Science Degree in Graphic Design from Pratt in 1964.

== Career ==
=== Underground comix ===
For a short period in the late 1960s, Griffith joined a team of artists that included Kim Deitch, Drew Friedman, Jay Lynch, Norman Saunders, Art Spiegelman, Bhob Stewart and Tom Sutton, who designed Wacky Packages trading cards for the Topps Company. Later, Griffith drew new "Wacky Packages Old School Sketch Cards" for Topps.

In 1969, Griffith began making underground comix, first in New York City. His first comic strips, which appeared in the East Village Other and Screw magazine, featured an angry amphibian named Mr. The Toad, who showed up later in a solo comics series and then as a recurring character in Zippy.

Griffith ventured to San Francisco, California in 1970 to join its burgeoning underground comix movement. He quickly gained a reputation for his willingness to collaborate and organize: one of his first acts upon arriving in San Francisco was to help form the United Cartoon Workers of America, along with Robert Crumb, Justin Green, Art Spiegelman, Spain Rodriguez, Roger Brand, Michele Brand, and Griffith's sister Nancy. (The U.C.W. of A. brand appeared on a number of comix from that era.)

Young Lust, an "X-rated parody of girl's romance comics" that Griffith co-founded and edited with cartoonist Jay Kinney, was a huge hit upon its 1970 debut, with the first issue enjoying multiple printings. The title eventually published eight issues, with the last one appearing in 1993 (with a ten-year gap between issues #6 and #7).

In 1973, Griffith was one of the founding members of Cartoonists' Co-op Press, along with Kim Deitch, Jerry Lane, Jay Lynch, Willy Murphy, Diane Noomin, and Spiegelman. The press was a short-lived self-publishing cooperative that operated out of Griffith's apartment. It was founded as an alternative to the existing underground presses, which were perceived as not being honest with their accounting practices. (For example, Griffith's popular anthology, Young Lust, ran through three publishers — Company & Sons, Print Mint, and Last Gasp — in its first three issues.)

Griffith's solo title, Tales of Toad, had a three-issue run from 1970 to 1973, published first by the Print Mint and then Cartoonists' Co-op Press. The main character, Mr. Toad, is a humanoid toad who embodies blind greed and selfishness.

Griffith's weekly comic strip Griffith Observatory (a play on the tourist attraction of the same name) was distributed by the Rip Off Press Syndicate in the late 1970s. Material from the strip was published in Rip Off Comix (Rip Off Press) and Arcade, and then collected, first by Rip Off Press in 1979, and then in an expanded edition by Fantagraphics in 1993.

=== Arcade ===
In 1975, after many years of gestation, Griffith and Spiegelman debuted the magazine-sized anthology Arcade, the Comics Revue, published by the Print Mint. Arriving late in the underground era, Arcade stood out from similar publications by having an ambitious editorial plan, in which Spiegelman and Griffith attempted to show how comics connected to the broader realms of artistic and literary culture. Arcade also introduced comic strips from ages past, as well as contemporary literary pieces by writers such as William S. Burroughs and Charles Bukowski, and illustrated nonfiction pieces by writers like Paul Krassner and J. Hoberman.

Soon after the magazine's debut, however, co-editor Spiegelman moved back to his original home of New York City, which put most of the editorial work for Arcade on the shoulders of Griffith and his new partner (later wife), Diane Noomin. This, combined with distribution problems, retailer indifference, and a general failure to find a devoted audience, led to the magazine's 1976 demise after seven issues. Nonetheless, many observers credit Arcade with paving the way for the Spiegelman-edited anthology Raw, the flagship publication of the 1980s alternative comics movement.

=== Zippy ===
The first Zippy story appeared in the underground comic Real Pulp #1 (Print Mint) in 1971. As Griffith said of that story, "I was asked to contribute a few pages to Real Pulp Comics #1, edited by Roger Brand. His only guideline was to say 'Maybe do some kind of love story, but with really weird people.' I never imagined I'd still be putting words into Zippy's fast-moving mouth some 38 years later."

Zippy's original appearance was partly inspired by the microcephalic Schlitzie, from the film Freaks, which was enjoying something of a cult revival at the time; as well as the P. T. Barnum sideshow performer Zip the Pinhead, who may not have been a microcephalic but was nevertheless billed as one.

The Zippy strip went weekly in 1976, first in the underground newspaper the Berkeley Barb and then syndicated nationally through the Rip Off Press Syndicate. At this point, Zippy strips began appearing regularly in High Times magazine .

In 1979, Griffith added his alter ego character, Griffy, to the strip. He describes Griffy as "neurotic, self-righteous and opinionated, someone with whom Zippy would certainly contrast. I brought the two characters together around 1979, perhaps symbolically bringing together the two halves of my personality. It worked. Their relationship seemed to make Zippy's random nuttiness more directed and Griffy's cranky, critical persona had his foil, someone to bounce happily off of his constant analysis of everything and everyone around him."

In 1979–1980, Last Gasp published a three-issue Zippy comics series, with much of the material made up of strips that had appeared in High Times. At first titled Yow (which is Zippy's exclamation when he is surprised), the title was changed to Zippy for the final issue.

The first full-length Zippy collection, Zippy Stories, was published in 1981 by And/Or Press. The collection was brought back to print by Last Gasp in 1984, and had multiple printings (up through 1995).

In 1986, the "Zippy Theme Song" was composed and performed, with lyrics by The B-52s' Fred Schneider and vocals by The Manhattan Transfer's Janis Siegel. Also on the cut are singers Phoebe Snow and Jon Hendricks.

The daily Zippy strip (syndicated by King Features Syndicate to over 200 newspapers worldwide) started in 1986. Griffith compares the creation of the strip to jazz: "When I'm doing a Zippy strip, I'm aware that I'm weaving elements together, almost improvising, as if I were all the instruments in a little jazz combo, then stepping back constantly to edit and fine-tune. Playing with language is what delights Zippy the most."

In October 1994 Griffith toured Cuba for two weeks, during a period of mass exodus, as thousands of Cubans took advantage of President Fidel Castro's decision to permit emigration for a limited time. In early 1995, Griffith published a six-week series of "comics journalism" stories about Cuban culture and politics in Zippy. The Cuba series included transcripts of conversations Griffith had conducted with various Cubans, including artists, government officials, and a Yoruba priestess.

Years ago, as continuity comic strips gave way to humor strips, typeset episode subtitles vanished from strips. Griffith keeps the tradition alive by always centering a hand-lettered subtitle above each Zippy strip.

In 2007, Griffith began to focus his daily strip on Zippy's "birthplace," Dingburg.

In 2008, Griffith presented a talk on Zippy at the University of Michigan at Ann Arbor. In it, he laid out his "Top 40 List on Comics and their Creation,” which has been reposted on numerous comics blog posts.

== Personal life ==
Griffith's younger sister, Nancy, was also involved in the underground comix community.

His wife was cartoonist Diane Noomin, whom he began dating in 1973 and married in 1980. They lived together in San Francisco from 1972 to 1998, first in an apartment on Fair Oaks Street, and then in their own house on 25th Street in Diamond Heights. They moved to Hadlyme, Connecticut, in 1998. Noomin died of uterine cancer in 2022.

== Bibliography ==
In January 2012, Fantagraphics published Bill Griffith: Lost and Found, Comics 1969-2003, a 392-page collection of Griffith's early work in underground comics from the East Village Other to his pages for The New Yorker and the National Lampoon in the 1980s and 1990s.

Griffith's mother's affair with cartoonist Lawrence Lariar formed the basis of Griffith's graphic novel memoir, Invisible Ink: My Mother’s Secret Love Affair with a Famous Cartoonist, published by Fantagraphics in October 2015. Invisible Ink depicts various other details and incidents involving Griffith's family, including his father's physical and psychological (but not sexual) abuse of his family members. He won the 2016 Eisner Award for Best Writer/Artist for Invisible Ink.

In March 2019, Griffith's graphic biography of Schlitzie, Nobody's Fool: The Life and Times of Schlitzie the Pinhead, was published by Abrams ComicArts.

In July 2023, Griffith produced a comic book memoir of Diane Noomin and their marriage together, titled The Buildings are Barking: Diane Noomin in Memoriam.

Griffith revealed in the August 19, 2020 Zippy strip that he was writing and drawing a graphic biography of Nancy cartoonist Ernie Bushmiller. The book, Three Rocks: The Story of Ernie Bushmiller: The Man Who Created Nancy, was published by Abrams ComicArts in August 2023.

In October 2025, Griffith produced a graphic biography of his great-grandfather William Henry Jackson, titled Photographic Memory: William Henry Jackson and the American West.

Zippy comics and books are now published by Fantagraphics.

=== Zippy titles (selected) ===
- Zippy Stories. Berkeley: And/Or Press, 1981. ISBN 0-915904-58-6. San Francisco: Last Gasp, 1984. ISBN 0-86719-325-5
- Nation of Pinheads. Berkeley: And/Or Press, 1982. ISBN 0-915904-71-3 Reprinted, San Francisco: Last Gasp, 1987. ISBN 0-86719-365-4 Zippy strips, 1979–1982.
- Pointed Behavior. San Francisco: Last Gasp, 1984. ISBN 0-86719-315-8 Zippy strips, 1983–1984.
- Are We Having Fun Yet? Zippy the Pinhead's 29-Day Guide to Random Activities and Arbitrary Donuts. New York: Dutton, 1985. ISBN 0-525-48184-2 Reprinted, Seattle: Fantagraphics, 1994. ISBN 1-56097-149-5
- Pindemonium. San Francisco: Last Gasp, 1986. ISBN 0-86719-348-4 Zippy strips, 1985–1986.
- King Pin: New Zippy Strips. New York: Dutton, 1987. ISBN 0-525-48330-6 Zippy strips, 1986–7.
- Pinhead's Progress: More Zippy Strips. New York: Dutton, 1989. ISBN 0-525-48468-X Zippy strips, 1987–8.
- From A to Zippy: Getting There Is All the Fun. New York: Penguin Books, 1991. ISBN 0-14-014988-0 Zippy strips, 1988–90.
- Zippy's House of Fun: 54 Months of Sundays. Seattle: Fantagraphics, 1995. ISBN 1-56097-162-2 (Color strips, May 1990 - September 1994)
- Zippy and beyond: A Pinhead's Progress - Comic Strips, Stories, Travel Sketches and Animation Material. San Francisco: Cartoon Art Museum, 1997.
- Zippy Quarterly (eighteen collections, published from January, 1993 until March, 1998) - no ISBN identification for these publications
- Zippy Annual: A millennial melange of microcephalic malapropisms and metaphysical muzak. ("Vol. 1", "Impressions based on random data".) Seattle: Fantagraphics, 2000. ISBN 1-56097-351-X
- Zippy Annual 2001. ("Vol. 2", "April 2001 - September 2001".) Seattle: Fantagraphics, 2001. ISBN 1-56097-472-9
- Zippy Annual 2002. ("Vol. 3", "September 2001 - October 2002".) Seattle: Fantagraphics, 2002. ISBN 1-56097-505-9
- Zippy Annual 2003. ("Vol. 4", "October 2002 - October 2003".) Seattle: Fantagraphics, 2003. ISBN 1-56097-563-6
- Zippy: From Here to Absurdity. ("Vol. 5", "November 2003 - November 2004".) Seattle: Fantagraphics, 2004. ISBN 1-56097-618-7
- Type Z Personality. ("Vol. 6", "December 2004 - December 2005".) Seattle: Fantagraphics, 2005, ISBN 1-56097-698-5
- Connect the Polka Dots. ("Vol. 7", December 2005 - August 2006".) Seattle: Fantagraphics, 2006. ISBN 978-1-56097-777-3
- Walk a Mile in My Muu-Muu. Seattle: Fantagraphics, 2007. ISBN 978-1-56097-877-0
- Welcome to Dingburg. Seattle: Fantagraphics, 2008. ISBN 978-1-56097-963-0
- Ding Dong Daddy from Dingburg. Seattle: Fantagraphics, 2010. ISBN 978-1-60699-389-7
- Zippy the Pinhead: The Dingburg Diaries. Seattle: Fantagraphics, 2013. ISBN 978-1606996416
