= ProJunior =

Comics character

- ProJunior in his original iteration, and then later appearance. Artwork by creator Don Dohler.

Publication information
- Publisher: The Print Mint, Kitchen Sink Press, Histrionic Publications
- First appearance: WILD (Don Dohler, 1961)
- First comic appearance: Bijou Funnies #4 (Print Mint, May 1970)
- Created by: Don Dohler

In-story information
- Species: Human
- Place of origin: Earth
- Partnerships: Honeybunch Kaminski

ProJunior, sometimes styled as Pro Junior, is an American comics character created by Don Dohler in 1958. He debuted in a fanzine in 1961, and in underground comix in 1970. Known as "Baltimore's blasphemous bad boy", the character is unusual in the underground genre for being "shared" by a number of different creators, appearing in stories by (among others) Jay Lynch, Art Spiegelman, Skip Williamson, and Robert Crumb. His main period of popularity was from 1970 to 1972.

The name of the character came from the teenage zine-maker Dohler's self-perceived status as a junior professional editor. By flipping "junior" and "pro" Dohler came up with "Pro Junior".

== Publication history ==
In 1961, at the age of 15, Dohler started a Mad magazine-style fanzine called WILD. As with Mad and Alfred E. Neuman, Dohler used his middle-school creation Pro Junior as WILD's mascot. In WILD's peak (the years 1961–1963) it featured cartoons by the likes of Jay Lynch, Art Spiegelman, and Skip Williamson, who all later went on to be significant contributors to the underground comix movement of the late 1960s and early 1970s.

In 1970, Lynch and Spiegelman were fooling around and they started drawing Pro Junior again, but this time in a leopard skin leotard. Robert Crumb saw the character — whose name he styled as ProJunior — and decided to draw a comic about him, which appeared in Bijou Funnies #4 (Print Mint, May 1970). From there, other underground cartoonists made ProJunior stories as well.

The character finally appeared in his own title in Don Dohler's ProJunior (Kitchen Sink Press, October 1971), which featured contributions from 22 underground cartoonists, including Lynch, Crumb, Spiegelman, Williamson, S. Clay Wilson, Evert Geradts, Jay Kinney, Justin Green, Jim Mitchell, Trina Robbins, Denis Kitchen, Bruce Walthers, Joel Beck, Bill Griffith—and his creator, Don Dohler.

ProJunior's final appearances were in Lynch and illustrator Gary Whitney's Phoebe & the Pigeon People comic strip, which were first published in the late 1970s.

== Characterization ==
Don Markstein describes ProJunior this way:

ProJunior was conceived as an avatar of Dohler himself, and aspired to become a professional in the comic book field.... [He] could always be identified by two characteristics — his Dagwood-style haircut; and the fact that the "whites" of his eyes were black, and the irises white.

In his original incarnation, Pro Junior had corks in his ears and four teeth. By the time he appeared as WILD's mascot, he became more recognizably human, with the flat-top haircut and a single tooth. When he began appearing in the comix he sported a leopard skin leotard, and under Crumb's direction dropped his cartooning aspirations and became more of a rabble-rouser and weekend revolutionary.

Projunior's first girlfriend was Belinda Berkeley, who left him after becoming "liberated" by the women's movement. His next girlfriend — and the person who shares many of his adventures — was the Crumb character Honeybunch Kaminski.

== List of comix appearances ==
- Bijou Funnies #4 (Print Mint, May 1970)
  - (by Robert Crumb) "ProJunior" ["I'm no playboy! I'm a workboy!"]
  - (by Daniel Clyne) "Dr. Lum Bago" — cameo (with a parody of Crumb's Snoid)
- (by Jay Lynch) "Too Much Too Soon", Teen-Age Horizons of Shangrila #1 (Kitchen Sink Press, [Summer] 1970)
- (by Robert Crumb) "She's Leaving Home", Uneeda Comix (Print Mint, [August] 1970) — with Honeybunch Kaminski and Belinda Berkeley
- Don Dohler's Projunior #1 (Kitchen Sink Press, Oct. 1971)
  - (by Robert Crumb and S. Clay Wilson) "Pro Junior in Perdido"
  - (by Evert Geradts) "Pro Junior"
  - (by Jay Lynch) "Bongo Bongo Bongo"
  - (by Jay Kinney) "Pro Junior Tries Yoga"
  - (by Justin Green and Art Spiegelman) "Pro Junior Learns To Draw"
  - (by Jim Mitchell) "Jim Mitchell's Pro Junior"
  - (by Trina Robbins) "Pro Junior and Belinda Berkeley Pull Dat Ole Switcheroo"
  - (by Peter Poplaski) "Pro Junior"
  - (by Peter Loft) "Pro Junior"
  - (by Ned Sonntag) "Pro Junior The Jazz Slinger"
  - (by Denis Kitchen) "Juan Cristobal Valdez deProJunior, Explorer"
  - (by Dave Dozier) "Pro Junior"
  - (by Wendel Pugh) "Pro Junior and the Junior Prom"
  - (by Dave Herring) "Look Out Sinner! Here Comes Pro Junior"
  - (by Bruce Walthers) "Pro Junior"
  - (by Dale Kuipers) "Pro Junior"
  - (by Justin Green) "Pro Junior"
  - (by Skip Williamson) "Pro Junior in Personal Turmoil"
  - (by Joel Beck) "Pro Junior Comix"
  - (by Bill Griffith) "Pro Junior's Little Difficulty"
  - (by Don Dohler) "Pro Junior in The Good Deed"
  - (by Denis Kitchen) "Beware Of Venereal Disease"
- (by Robert Crumb) "ProJunior" ["Projunior, our welfare's been cut again!!!"], Bijou Funnies #6 (Kitchen Sink Press, 1971) — with Honeybunch Kaminski
- (by Jay Lynch) "Projunior Movies", Teen-Age Horizons of Shangrila #2 (Kitchen Sink Press, November 1972)
- (by Gail Burwen) "Manhattan Madness", Apple Pie #1 (Histronic Publications, March 1975)
- Phoebe & the Pigeon People #1 (Kitchen Sink Press, June 1979)
  - (by Jay Lynch and Gary Whitney) untitled ["Sigh! I thought that if I took my rambunctious teen-age nephew, Pro Junior, ..."]
  - (by Lynch and Whitney) untitled ["I'm sick of having you embarrass me with this jungle boy routine of yours, Pro Junior!"]
  - (by Lynch and Whitney) untitled ["Lord knows I've tried talking sense into the boy -- "]

== Further information ==
- "Letters", Mr. Monster's Super Duper Special #7 (Eclipse Comics, May 1987)
