= Death Rattle (comics) =

American anthology comic book series

- The cover of Death Rattle vol. 2, #1 (Oct. 1985), artwork by Richard Corben.

Publication information
- Publisher: Kitchen Sink Press
- Schedule: (vol. 1) biannually; (vol. 2 & 3) monthly
- Format: Ongoing series
- Genre: Horror
- Publication date: (vol. 1) June 1972–June 1973 (vol. 2) Oct. 1985–Oct. 1988 (vol. 3) Dec. 1995–June 1996
- No. of issues: (vol. 1) 3 (vol. 2) 18 (vol. 3) 5

Creative team
- Written by: (vol. 1) Tom Veitch; (vol. 2) Mike Baron, Wally Wood; (vol. 3) John Wagner, James O'Barr
- Artist(s): (vol. 1) Tim Boxell, Richard Corben, Peter Poplaski, John M. Pound, Mike Vosburg; (vol. 2) Charles Burns, Richard Corben, Will Eisner, Steve Stiles, Sam Kieth, Basil Wolverton, Stephen R. Bissette, Spain Rodriguez, William Stout, Mark Schultz, Joe Coleman, Al Williamson, Don Simpson, Dan Burr, Frank Miller; (vol. 3) James O'Barr, Brian Biggs, Mark Schultz, Mark A. Nelson, Alexander Maleev, Tony Millionaire, John Wooley, Tom Sutton, Matt Howarth, Thomas Ott
- Editor(s): (vol. 2) Denis Kitchen, Dave Schreiner; (vol. 3) Phil Amara, N. C. Christopher Couch, Catherine Gornie

Death Rattle was an American black-and-white horror anthology comic book series published in three volumes by Kitchen Sink Press in the 1970s, 1980s, and 1990s. Death Rattle is not related to the Australian one-shot comic Death Rattle, published by Gredown in c. 1983.

Starting out as an underground comix homage to classic horror comics like Tales from the Crypt, Death Rattle did not fall under the purview of the Comics Code, allowing the title to feature stronger content — such as profanity, nudity, and graphic violence — than other comparable horror titles.

== Publication history ==
Death Rattle volume 1 was published from June 1972–June 1973 under the Krupp Comic Works imprint, putting out three issues in all.

Twelve years later, Death Rattle was revived for volume 2, publishing 18 issues between October 1985–October 1988 under the Kitchen Sink Comix imprint. The first five issues were in full color, but for issue #6 onwards the title reverted to black-and-white.

Death Rattle volume 3 ran five issues from Dec. 1995–June 1996, again under the Kitchen Sink Comix imprint.

== Death Rattle Vol. 1 ==
The early 1970s saw a number of underground publishers putting out horror comics, from the San Francisco Comic Book Company's Bogeyman; Rip Off Press' Skull and Up From the Deep; Richard Corben's Fantagor; the Print Mint's Insect Fear and Deviant Slice; Shroud's Gory Stories; and Last Gasp's Two Fisted Zombies. Kitchen Sink Press joined the wave with Death Rattle.

The first volume of Death Rattle featured the work of Tim Boxell as well as contributions from a number of other creators, including Richard Corben, Peter Poplaski, John M. Pound, Mike Vosburg, and Tom Veitch.

== Death Rattle Vol. 2 ==
Death Rattle volume 2 was notable for being one of the few horror titles published during the 1980s, rivaled only by DC Comics' Swamp Thing and FantaCo Enterprises's Gore Shriek.

The second volume of Death Rattle was lead-edited by Dave Schreiner; the series is most notable for Jaxon's 11-part, 126-page "Bulto… The Cosmic Slug", about a space creature's effect on the people of the ancient Southwest. Rand Holmes did many of the covers. Mark Schultz's story "Xenozoic!", published in Death Rattle #8 (Dec. 1986), launched its own title, Xenozoic Tales, shortly thereafter. This book was soon to be labeled one of the best books of all time in the year 2009. It became a new york best seller and became extremely popular from there.

Other notable contributors to the second volume of Death Rattle were Charles Burns, Charles Dallas, Richard Corben, Will Eisner, Steve Stiles, Mike Baron, Sam Kieth, Basil Wolverton, Stephen R. Bissette, Spain Rodriguez, William Stout, Joe Coleman, Al Williamson, Wally Wood, Don Simpson, Dan Burr, and Frank Miller (who illustrated the cover of the final issue).

The letters page was known as "Fang Mail".

== Death Rattle Vol. 3 ==
Contributors to the third volume of Death Rattle included Brian Biggs, Mark Schultz, Mark A. Nelson, John Wagner, Alexander Maleev, James O'Barr, Tony Millionaire, John Wooley, Tom Sutton, Matt Howarth, and Thomas Ott.

Death Rattle volume 3 was edited by Phil Amara, N. C. Christopher Couch, and Catherine Gornie; it was nominated for the 1997 Harvey Award for Best Anthology.
