= Cadillacs and Dinosaurs (TV series) =

1993 international animated television series

- Official DVD cover
- Genre: Adventure; Science fantasy
- Based on: Xenozoic Tales by Mark Schultz
- Developed by: Steven E. de Souza
- Directed by: Raymond Jafelice
- Starring: Don Dickinson; Ted Dillon; David Fox; Don Francks; Dawn Greenhalgh; David Keeley; Kristina Nicoll; Colin O'Meara; Frank Pellegrino; Susan Roman; John Stocker; Bruce Tubb; Philip Williams; Lenore Zann
- Narrated by: Greg Spottiswood
- Composer: John Tucker
- Countries of origin: Canada; United States
- Original language: English
- No. of seasons: 1
- No. of episodes: 13

Production
- Executive producers: Steven E. de Souza; Sasha Harari; Michael Hirsh; Patrick Loubert; Toper Taylor
- Production companies: Nelvana; Galaxy Films; De Souza Productions

Original release
- Network: CBS (United States); YTV (Canada)
- Release: September 18, 1993 – January 28, 1994

Cadillacs and Dinosaurs is an animated television series produced by Nelvana, De Souza Productions and Galaxy Films, which aired on CBS as part of its Saturday morning children's lineup in the United States from 1993 to 1994, lasting for one season of 13 episodes. Based on Xenozoic Tales by Mark Schultz, the show was created by screenwriter Steven E. de Souza, who acquired the TV rights after producing the video game Cadillacs and Dinosaurs, which was also based on Schultz's comic. The show dealt with many strong ecological and political issues that were central to the plot development.

== Plot ==
The series chronicles the exploits of Jack Tenrec and his crew of ecological freedom fighters known as the "Mechanics." Set after the year 2627, the series takes place in a post-apocalyptic jungle in the vicinity of the ruins of New York City (now known as "The City in the Sea"). Societies have had to re-learn 20th-century technology, lost due to a never-explicitly-stated catastrophe, and have only been partially successful in doing so. The Mechanics have maintained much "Old World" technology and knowledge. Jack Tenrec's often-reluctant companion is Hannah Dundee, an ambassador from Wasoon somewhere south, a place technologically much further behind than the City in the Sea. Dundee hires Tenrec as a liaison, while she attempts to create clear communication between her land and the modern civilization. Since the catastrophe, much of the former United States has gone wild with many species of dinosaurs spontaneously reappearing after going extinct. Together, Jack and Hannah confront the serious issues facing the futuristic environment that humanity has come to inhabit.

Jack also has Hermes, a juvenile "cutter" that Jack hand-reared after the latter's mother's death. Gentle with Jack and Hannah, he can still be rather fierce when angered. The show also includes a race of intelligent lizards called "Griths".

Jack and his crew square off against opposition including the triumvirate Council of Governors, particularly Jack's archenemy Wilhelmina Scharnhorst, and Hammer Terhune's gang.

== Characters ==
Heroes

- Jack Tenrec (voiced by David Keeley) is a survival-savvy garage mechanic who is a member of the Old Blood Mechanics. Jack has a passion for restoring classic car shells (mainly those of Cadillacs) which the Mechanics use as their mode of transportation.
- Hannah Dundee (voiced by Susan Roman) is a foreign ambassador from Wasoon who is Jack's constant companion and love interest. She is often on a mission to stop Jack from running his enemies into his neighbors' territory.
- Mustapha Cairo (voiced by Bruce Tubbe) is Jack's companion who often helps Jack in his endeavors. He is an engineer.
- Kirgo (voiced by David Fox) is a ferryman associated with the City in the Sea and a friend of Jack.
- Hermes is a juvenile "Cutter" (Allosaurus) that was raised by Jack. Although he is gentle towards Jack and Hannah, Hermes can still be rather fierce when angered.

Villains

- Council of Governors is a council that rules the City in the Sea.
  - Governor Wilhelmina Scharnhorst (voiced by Dawn Greenhalgh) – corrupt, power-hungry, and uncaring of the balance of nature, Wilhelmina is one of the three governors in the City in the Sea, and Jack's nemesis. Wilhelmina has hired Hammer Terhune and his gang to do her dirty work. Despite her callous nature and disdain for Jack, whom she sees as an obstacle to her rise to power and to humanity's dominance as a whole, Wilhelmina only wants what's best for her city and knows when to respect Jack, though it's usually only when doing so will benefit her interests as well.
  - Governor Dahlgren (voiced by Kristina Nicoll) is a female who is the voice of reason to the governors. Her governing styles are said to have been heavily influenced by Jack.
  - Governor Toulouse (voiced by Philip Williams) is the public relations man of the governors. His concerns all lie on the morale and attitude of the public regarding potential problems. Even though Toulouse means well, he is not used to the outdoor lifestyles of Jack Tenrec.
  - Nock (voiced by Don Dickinson) is the Captain of the Guards in the City in the Sea. He is one of the people who have a dislike for Jack Tenrec. Nock is a sycophant and a very corrupt officer, obeying Scharnhorst without caring if she is wrong, lying any time and to anyone he deems convenient, and even trying to pull off scams.
- Dr. Fessenden (voiced by John Stocker) is a mad scientist who would often invent some technology for Wilhelmina to use, particularly radio-based gadgets (his name coming from radio pioneer Reginald Fessenden).
- Hammer Terhune (voiced by Ted Dillon) is a burly poacher who would often attack Jack Tenrec. Although he was hired by Wilhelmina Scharnhorst, he shows no respect to her unless she has some technology for him to use and would betray her if he sees a chance.
  - Wrench Terhune (voiced by Colin O'Meara) is Hammer's younger brother who wears a headband.
  - Vice Terhune (voiced by Frank Pellegrino) is Hammer's younger brother who wears a ponytail.
  - Mikla (voiced by Lenore Zann) is a female who is a member of Hammer's gang.

Allies

- Griths are a race of lizard men who reside in caverns.
  - Hobb (voiced by Don Francks) is a Grith who serves as Jack's translator to the Griths due to his telepathy.
  - Wild Boy is a wild child raised by the Griths that wears a loincloth and animal hide boots. He does not speak any human language, but can communicate with the dinosaurs. The Griths raised the Wild Boy ever since saving him from the cave hyenas. He first appears in "Wild Child" where Jack and Hanna discover him and try to keep him out of Hammer Terhune's clutches while returning him to the Griths. In "Duel", the Wild Boy later brings Jack and Hannah to the Griths at the time when Jack's old friend Sean has stolen their lifestone.
  - Adamus (voiced by David Fraser) is a powerful ally who's part man and part machine. He appears in only one episode which happens to be "Remembrance".

=== Creatures ===
Many of the dinosaurs (commonly referred to as "slithers") and other prehistoric creatures featured in this series are referred to by different names:

- Cutter – Allosaurus
- Shivat – Tyrannosaurus
- Mack – Triceratops
- Sandbuck – Apatosaurus
- Tri-colored Sandbuck – Diplodocus
- Wahonchuck – Stegosaurus
- Whiptail – Nothosaurus
- Thresher – Mosasaurus
- Zeke – Pteranodon
- Bonehead – Pachycephalosaurus
- Tree Grazer – Brachiosaurus
- Hornbill – Parasaurolophus
- Crawler – Ankylosaurus
- Deinonychus
- Velociraptor
- Dimetrodon
- Glyptodon
- Cave hyena
- Woolly mammoth
- Peramus
- Phorusrhacos
- Troodon
- Eoraptor
- Machairodus
- Compsognathus
- Coelophysis
- Struthiomimus
- Protoceratops
- Mixosaurus
- Stegoceras

== Episodes ==
No.	Title	Written by	Original release date
1	"Rogue"	Steven E. de Souza	September 18, 1993
Hammer cuts Hannah and her expedition off with an ambush. Jack heads to a burning town where he is blamed for the attack of a Shivat. Wilhelmina is intent on destroying every settlement and Jack. At the coast to the Ocean City, Hannah mistakes Jack for a poacher. Jack takes Hannah to his garage to meet Mustapha and Hermes. Jack goes off to eliminate the rampaging Shivat, but instead finds and destroys the receiver Hammer attached to its neck. After a long fist fight with Hammer, Jack scares off Hammer. Jack confronts Wilhelmina with no results.
2	"Dino Drive"	Herbert J. Wright	September 25, 1993
An earthquake causes a herd of Macks to stampede through a village. Wilhelmina intends to exterminate them which Jack points out will disrupt the ecological life cycle. Jack is promoted to take care of the threat. Jack plans to rally the Macks away with three Cadillacs and aid from Hermes. Jack manages to herd the Macks and thwart Hammer's ambush attempt. The Mack leader destroys Mustapha's Cadillac. Wilhelmina makes a deal with Hammer to ruin Jack and kill all the Macks. Hammer detonates dynamite and smoke bombs in a nearby pass, but Jack counters him and drives his men away. The Macks make it to their new home.
3	"Death Ray"	Ted Pedersen; Francis Moss; Dennise Fordham	October 2, 1993
Dr. Fessenden shows Wilhelmina a satellite laser, but needs to get to the station in Grith territory. Wilhelmina requests Jack to take Dr. Fessenden there. They avoid a Shivat on the way. Jack receives a talisman from the Griths. Hammer abducts Dr. Fessenden, finding out about the Death Ray. Jack, Hannah and Fessenden reach the station and Hannah finds out Dr. Fessenden's true intentions. Hammer catches Jack and Hannah. Before the laser can be tested on them, they escape. Hammer intends to destroy Sea City. As Hannah re-aims the laser on the station, a stampeding herd of Mammoths arrive and Hammer's lot flees. Jack rescues a Zeke's baby before the station blows up. Jack leaves the talisman to the Griths.
4	"Siege"	Michael Part; Martin Pasko	October 9, 1993
After Jack stops Hammer from poaching tri-colored Sandbucks, he swears revenge. Mikla goes undercover getting in Jack's inner circle when she thwarts a minor attack from poachers. Hammer sends his full force to besiege Jack's garage. Before Jack and his men can fire the lava launchers, they malfunction from the valve Hermes damaged earlier. Jack descends into the crater to reach the source having difficulty along the way, but turns the main valve. The attackers are warded off, but Hammer penetrates and captures everyone. Jack tricks Hammer into turning on the water system that flushes them out of the garage.
5	"Wild Child"	Marv Wolfman	October 23, 1993
Jack and Hannah go for an expedition to a mine. When they are chased by a herd of Wahonchucks, they find a wild boy amongst them. While Jack investigates the mine, Hannah goes after the boy, saving him from a Zeke. Jack tries to help a wounded Sandbuck, when Hobbs attends to it and asks Jack to find the wild boy. Jack learns from a Grith that they raised the boy after saving him from cave hyenas. Hannah is attacked in a lake by a Thresher, but the boy talks to it. Hammer sees this as an opportunity to pin the Sandbucks. Hannah refuses to let the boy go until Hobbs explains how they raised him. Hammer kidnaps the boy and uses him to talk with a slither. Jack and Hannah rescue the boy and the slither, Hammer following in pursuit. The boy is then returned to the Grith.
6	"Mind Over Matter"	Laura Phillips; Dennise Fordham	November 6, 1993
Jack and Hannah go to the Mole Market to trade. Hannah swipes a top secret file. Jack runs into a Mack and finds the river dried up. Hannah finds out the document is the property of Wilhelmina regarding an ancient laboratory. Jack finds the river has been dammed up so that Wilhelmina's men can excavate the lab. Hannah is caught but Jack assists her. Dr. Fessenden activates a deadly robot. The robot activates other robots, becoming a threat even for Wilhelmina. The diggers destroy the lab. The robots survive, but Jack destroys the dam to bury the dig site.
7	"Survival"	David Wise	November 20, 1993
Jack extracts rubber from trees, while Laschard blasts a ravine disturbing a family of Wahonchucks and getting himself trapped. Wilhelmina has uncovered a train. Hannah knew a similar train with toxic material nearly wiped out her people, so she and Jack get some flowers which are an antidote. Wilhelmina assigns Laschard to kill Jack. His attempts fail. Wilhelmina tries to abort Laschard's assignment when she sees the ill state Mustapha is in, but Laschard doesn't listen. Jack and Hannah fail to get Laschard's car as a Cutter stands guard. Next day, Hannah turns a group of Cutters against Laschard and Jack diverts the Cutters into a river. Jack and Hannah reach the Sea City and provide the flowers for the antidote.
8	"It Only Comes Out at Night"	Marty Isenberg; Robert Skir	November 27, 1993
As Jack docks at Sea City, Kirgo is taken away by a Whiptail. Jack and Hannah investigate the night disappearances and the Whiptail. They are attacked by the monster inside an excavation tunnel. Wilhelmina refuses to believe Jack's findings. Jack and Hannah try again to track the Whiptail. As the Whiptail passes them, Mustapha arrives with Jack's Cadillac. When they try to lure the Whiptail it abducts Mustapha. Jack chases the Whiptail in his car until he finds her lair. They find Kirgo and Mustapha and that the Whiptail has no babies save one. Hannah rescues the Whiptails and sorts out the excavation problem the following morning.
9	"Remembrance"	David Wise	December 11, 1993
Jack and Hannah successfully evade a Shivat and uncover a storage capsule, with a hibernating man. The man is called Adamus, and reveals he was put in the capsule in 2027. Jack takes him and Hannah to meet an old friend Captras. As Adamus prevents an accident, Hammer spreads word of his presence to Wilhelmina. Jack evacuates Adamus and they run into the Shivat again. When Adamus drives it away, Jack discovers Adamus is an android, while Wilhelmina uncovers the capsule and a codebook inside. Adamus is suspected to be dangerous and sure enough Wilhelmina arrives and Dr. Fessenden takes control of him. As Wilhelmina uncovers an explosives cache, Adamus fires a missile causing a volcano to erupt. Hannah turns Adamus against Wilhelmina. Jack and Adamus successfully block the volcanic lava flow from the settlement. Adamus is put back into his capsule.
10	"Pursuit"	David Wise	December 18, 1993
Jack is arrested after he fails to stop Hammer from salvaging the government's pile driver. In court, Jack retells the time the pile driver was in testing and Hammer in pursuit of it. Jack is tried guilty, but escapes from his sentence. Wilhelmina hires a bounty hunter called Brink to capture Jack. While Hannah searches for evidence, Jack pursues the poachers only to be caught by Brink, but he gets away. Hannah soon finds evidence of Captain Nock's person and divulges the truth to Wilhelmina, forcing her to exonerate Jack. Jack destroys the tech house and Brink arrests Hammer.
11	"Departure"	David Wise	January 14, 1994
As preparations are made at the harbor, a Thresher attacks and heads up the city canal raiding a fish market. Jack scares away the Thresher. Hannah brings a flock of Zekes to the city despite Wilhelmina's disapproval. Hannah decides to leave for her hometown. Jack tries to convince Hannah to let him escort her. As they go their separate ways, Jack gets attacked by a large war tank. Jack is captured by Lars Striker. Jack refuses to assist Lars and plunges into a river, with Hannah coming to his rescue. Together, they stop Lars and destroy his tank. The Zekes prove useful against the Threshers and Hannah begrudgingly decides to stay after all, while Wilhelmina takes the credit for her idea.
12	"Duel"	Michael Reaves	January 21, 1994
Jack barely escapes from a Bonehead. Back at the garage Jack meets his old buddy and fellow Old Blood Sean Rustle. Hannah doesn't find him good company. The next day Jack returns to find Hermes drugged and his Whirlybird engine stolen. Shortly, Hermes and every other dinosaur act very strangely. The Wild Boy takes Jack and Hannah to the Grith lair where they are dying from the lifestone having been stolen. Jack retells how Sean was always one step ahead of him. Sean reveals his deceitful nature. After blasting Sean out of his chopper, Jack decides to do a rematch race against him. Jack outruns Sean, Hannah saves him from falling, and they return the lifestone to the Griths.
13	"Wildfire"	David Wise (teleplay); Harlan Ellison (story)	January 28, 1994
Hannah manages to maneuver Jack's Cadillac past an earthquake area. Hammer sets fire to the jungle with dynamite. As Jack investigates the fire, Wilhelmina assigns him to deliver nitroglycerin to blow the canyon escorted by the poachers and Mustapha. The convoy runs into a sick Tree Grazer, but Hannah helps it. The convoy manages to cross an unstable bridge and avoid Laschard. Hammer loses one of the trucks. At the river, Hammer tries to dispose of Jack, but he and Hannah fire at them. Hammer recruits Laschard to assist him. With more pursuing, Hannah drives the Cadillac and crashes into the canyon wall, blocking the fire.

== Production ==
The cost per episode for Cadillacs and Dinosaurs was $430,000 with each episode containing 20,000 more animation cels than comparable cartoons on the air at the time. According to Xenozoic Tales creator, writer, and artist Mark Schultz attempts had been made to adapt Xenozoic Tales for several years before Schultz and publisher Denis Kitchen signed a deal with Galaxie Entertainment to adapt the series to other media. Galaxie took the property to various animation companies with Nelvana showing the greatest understanding and developed the project there with executive producer Steven E. de Souza writing both the series bible and pilot episode to show to CBS who approved the pitch. Kitchen and Schultz were very involved with Nelvana in developing the series, and while Schultz did have creative veto power he rarely used it as he trusted the Nelvana staff and his only adamant point was in the designs of the dinosaurs as he wanted to avoid the older "tail dragging" designs and instead present them as much more horizontal.

== Release ==
=== Broadcast ===
The series was broadcast in the United States on CBS from September 18, 1993 through March 11, 1994. The series was rebroadcast on the USA Network as part of USA Cartoon Express for the 1994-95 television season. In February 1994, the series' renewal status was described as "up in the air" as the series had dealt with preemption due to CBS' coverage of the 1994 Winter Olympics. Executive producer Sasha Harari criticized CBS' handling of the show saying that network management was more focused on their prime time programming and didn't support their children's division the way Fox or ABC did with their own children's programming. When the series was picked up by the USA Network, the network was reportedly interested in a possible second season.

In Canada, the show premiered on October 2, 1993, on YTV.

The show aired in the Republic of Ireland on RTÉ Two from 29 August 1995 to 1996. In addition, the series has aired for many years on HBO Family in Latin America, where the episodes can be viewed dubbed in Spanish or in their original English. In 2002, the series has Spanish-dubbed aired on Telefutura, as part of Toonturama block until 2003.

=== Home media ===
Select episodes were released on VHS in the 1990s by Sony Wonder. Only the first two episodes of the show are available in the United States through the video retailer Amazon Video, and in Canada it was available through the streaming video service Shomi until the service was cancelled. In 2015, the entire series was made available for free viewing through the Nelvana Retro channel on YouTube, renamed YTV Direct in 2016. YTV Direct was renamed to Keep It Weird in 2018 and no longer features the show. In 2019, Retro Rerun uploaded all of the episodes on their YouTube channel.

== Reception ==
=== Critical response ===
Esther Sinclair, UCLA associate professor of psychiatry and bio-behavioral sciences, analyzed the message of the show: "Jack is altruistic, does not have aggressive impulses, resists temptation and is sympathetic toward others.... The viewer may draw an analogy to other endangered species such as eagles and condors.... There is an emphasis on the interconnection of all living things. Jack respects all life forms".
