= Kitchen Sink Press =

American comic book publisher

- Parent company: Krupp Comic Works (1970–1975)
- Founded: 1970; 56 years ago
- Founder: Denis Kitchen
- Defunct: 1999; 27 years ago
- Country of origin: U.S.
- Headquarters location: Princeton, Wisconsin (1970–1992); Northampton, Massachusetts (1993–1999)
- Publication types: Comic books
- Fiction genres: Alternative comics, underground comics
- Imprints: Krupp Comic Works; Kitchen Sink Comix; Kitchen Sink Enterprises; Top Dollar Comics
- Official website: www.deniskitchen.com

Kitchen Sink Press was a comic book publishing company founded by Denis Kitchen in 1970. Kitchen Sink Press was a pioneering publisher of underground comics, and was also responsible for numerous republications of classic comic strips in hardcover and softcover volumes. One of their best-known products was the first full reprint of Will Eisner's The Spirit—first in magazine format, then in standard comic book format. The company closed in 1999.

== History ==
=== Origins ===
In 1969 Milwaukee artist Denis Kitchen decided to self-publish his comics and cartoons in the magazine Mom's Homemade Comics, inspired in part by the seminal underground comix titles Bijou Funnies and Zap Comix. The selling out of the 4,000 print-run inspired him further, and in 1970 he founded Kitchen Sink Press (initially as an artists' cooperative) and launched the Milwaukee-based underground newspaper The Bugle-American, with Jim Mitchell and others. Under the name of the Krupp Syndicate, (Note: "Steve Krupp" was a comics character created by Kitchen as a stand-in for then-Marvel Comics publisher Stan Lee. Kitchen created the Krupp character in 1975 as part of the cover illustration of Comix Book #3.) he syndicated comic strips to almost fifty other underground and college newspapers.

In addition to Milwaukee artists like himself, Mitchell, Bruce Walthers, Don Glassford, and Wendel Pugh, Kitchen began to publish works by such cartoonists as Mike Baron, Howard Cruse, Trina Robbins and S. Clay Wilson (as well as taking over the publishing duties of Bijou Funnies from 1970 to 1973), and he soon expanded his operations, launching Krupp Comic Works, a parent organization into which he placed ownership of Kitchen Sink Press and through which he also launched such diverse ventures as a record company and a commercial art studio.

Kitchen established a long-running relationship with Will Eisner beginning in 1973 with a two-issue series of Eisner's classic comics series The Spirit. As a result of the success of Kitchen Sink Press's underground reprints, Warren Publishing launched a regular Spirit reprint series in magazine format in 1974. After Warren's magazine folded in 1976, Kitchen Sink picked it up in 1977, continuing with Warren's numbering until issue #41 in 1983. Other notable Kitchen Sink titles from the 1970s include anthologies like the horror title Death Rattle vol. 1 (3 issues, launched in 1972), Bizarre Sex (10 issues, launched in 1972), Snarf (15 issues, launched Feb. 1972), and Dope Comix (5 issues, launched in 1978).

The publisher supplemented revenues with the sale of merchandise such as posters, buttons, trading cards, and sound records.

=== 1980s ===
Legal restrictions in the mid-1970s closed down many head shops, which had been a primary outlet for underground comix. Kitchen Sink diversified what it published, expanding into post-underground alternative comics, such as with the works of Don Simpson, Charles Burns, and Reed Waller, and reprints of older works by artists such as Eisner, Harvey Kurtzman, and Ernie Bushmiller. Kitchen Sink also maintained a large back catalogue. As Kitchen devoted himself to publishing, his own cartooning work became scarce.

Transitioning from an underground publisher, in the 1980s Kitchen Sink launched such titles as Death Rattle vol. 2 (18 issues, beginning in 1985), Mark Schultz' post-apocalyptic Xenozoic Tales (14 issues, beginning in 1987), James Vance & Dan Burr's acclaimed limited series Kings in Disguise (6 issues, 1988–1989), and Doug Allen's Steven (8 issues, 1989–1996). Other titles launched by Kitchen Sink Press in this period, but later continued by other publishers, include Howard Cruse's Gay Comix, Don Simpson's Megaton Man, and Reed Waller and Kate Worley's Omaha the Cat Dancer. Kitchen Sink continued publishing the Snarf anthology until 1990.

Kitchen launched a second volume of The Spirit reprints in 1983, with a smaller page count and in standard comic book format. This incarnation of the reprints ran for 87 issues until 1992. Also in 1983, he launched the magazine Will Eisner's Quarterly, featuring new work by Eisner (previously, excerpts of Eisner's new projects had appeared in the Spirit magazine). The 1980s also saw Kitchen Sink branching out into reprints of classic comic strips beyond EIsner's work. Kitchen Sink published Steve Canyon reprints from 1983 to 1992, Li'l Abner collections from 1988 to 1999, and Nancy collections from 1989 to 1991.

=== 1990s ===
Continuing their practice of collecting comic strips, in the 1990s Kitchen Sink reprinted volumes of Alley Oop, Flash Gordon, and Krazy Kat. Original titles published by Kitchen Sink in the 1990s include Grateful Dead Comix (9 total issues, 1991–1993), editor Diane Noomin's Twisted Sisters limited series, (1994), Death Rattle vol. 3 (5 issues, 1995–1996), and more Eisner projects. Kitchen Sink also launched Charles Burns' Black Hole, which was later republished and augmented by Fantagraphics Books.

==== Tundra, move to Massachusetts, and demise ====
In 1993, Kitchen moved operations from Princeton, Wisconsin, to Northampton, Massachusetts, in a controversial – and ultimately disastrous – merger with Tundra Publishing.

Kitchen Sink/Tundra's output was strong through 1993, as reflected in the company's success at the 1994 Harvey Awards, coming away with Harveys for Best Writer (Scott McCloud for Understanding Comics), Best New Series (Captain Sternn), Best Graphic Album of Original Work (Understanding Comics), Best Anthology (Blab!), and Best Biographical, Historical, or Journalistic Presentation (Understanding Comics). (The company also picked up an Eisner Award that year for Best Comics-Related Book for Understanding Comics.)

In 1994, the company was sold to a Los Angeles–based investment group. The company spent the bulk of 1996–1998 releasing various original The Crow limited series, but the writing was on the wall. Media entrepreneur Fred Seibert cobbled together a group of small investors to try to reverse the fortunes of the company in 1997. After the failure of expansion into other venues of entertainment and merchandising, Kitchen Sink Press dissolved in 1999.

== Later projects ==
In 2001 and 2012, Kitchen published comics under the publisher name of Denis Kitchen Publishing.

In 2013, Dark Horse Comics announced an imprint, helmed by Denis Kitchen and John Lind, called Kitchen Sink Books. Dark Horse editor Philip Simon commented on unannounced projects saying "everything [Denis and John] are bringing to the table is going to be historically important".

Also in 2013, Columbia University's Rare Book & Manuscript Library made arrangements with Kitchen to acquire the archives of Kitchen Sink Press, including business documents, artwork, and correspondence. Columbia librarian Karen Green said the archives were "meticulously preserved".

== Publications (selected) ==
=== Original titles ===
==== 1960s–1970s ====
- Bijou Funnies (4 issues, 1970–1973) – issues #5–8, taking over from the Print Mint)
- Bizarre Sex (10 issues, May 1972–December 1982)
- Comix Book (2 issues, 1976, acquired from Marvel Comics)
- Death Rattle vol. 1 (3 issues, 1972)
- Deep 3D Comix (Summer 1970) – Don Glassford
- Don Dohler's ProJunior (1971) – anthology of ProJunior (created by Don Dohler) strips by underground cartoonists, including Jay Lynch, Robert Crumb, S. Clay Wilson, Evert Geradts, Jay Kinney, Art Spiegelman, Justin Green, Trina Robbins, Denis Kitchen, Bruce Walthers, Skip Williamson, Joel Beck, Bill Griffith, and Don Dohler himself
- Dope Comix (5 issues, 1978–1984) – anti-drug anthology
- Home Grown Funnies (January 1971) – Robert Crumb
- Hungry Chuck Biscuits Comics and Stories (1971) – anthology featuring Dan Clyne, Skip Williamson, Joel Beck, Denis Kitchen, Don Glassford, Jim Mitchell, and Dave Dozier
- Mom's Homemade Comics (2 issues, June 1969, Oct. 1972) – 3 issues; 2nd issue published by the Print Mint
- Smile (3 issues, Summer 1970 - Aug. 1972) – omnibus mostly featuring Jim Mitchell
- Snarf (15 issues, February 1972 – October 1990)
- Teen-Age Horizons of Shangrila (2 issues, Summer 1970 – November 1972) – teen humor spoof anthology with contributors like Jay Lynch, Denis Kitchen, Justin Green, Richard "Grass" Green, Joel Beck, Trina Robbins, and Robert Armstrong
- Weird Trips magazine (2 issues, 1974 and 1978) - articles mixed with illustrations; artists included Kitchen, Peter Poplaski and Joel Beck.

==== 1980s ====
- BLAB! (6 issues, #3–8, 1988–1995; later continued by Fantagraphics)
- Border Worlds (7 issues, 1986–1987)
- Death Rattle vol. 2 (18 issues, 1985–1988)
- Gay Comix (5 issues, 1980–1984; later published by Bob Ross)
- Denizens of Deep City (8 issues, 1988–1990) – Doug Potter
- Kings in Disguise (6 issues, 1988–1989)
- Megaton Man (10 issues, 1984–1986; now published by Image Comics)
- Melody (10 issues, 1988–1995; now published by Eros Comix)
- Omaha the Cat Dancer (21 issues, #0–20; 1986–June 1994; now published by NBM Publishing)
- Steven (8 issues, 1989–1996)
- Will Eisner's Quarterly (8 issues, 1983–1986)
- Xenozoic Tales (14 issues, 1987–1996)

==== 1990s ====
- Black Hole (4 issues, 1995–1998) (later republished with additional 8 issues by Fantagraphics Books)
- Button Man (1994; previously serialized in 2000 AD by Rebellion Developments
- Cherry (6 issues, #14–19, 1993–1996; taking over from Last Gasp; later published by Cherry Comics)
- The Crow (various original mini-series, 1996–1998)
- Death Rattle vol. 3 (5 issues, 1995–1996)
- From Hell (1998; previously serialized in Taboo by Spiderbaby Grafix & Publications before the series ceased publishing. Kitchen Sink then reprinted the series after Moore and Campbell Published it through Mad Love. Currently a collected edition is published by Top Shelf Productions)
- Grateful Dead Comix (9 total issues, 1991–1993)
- Illegal Alien (1994; reprinted by Titan Books and Dark Horse Comics)
- Life on Another Planet (1996)
- The Spirit: The New Adventures (8 issues, 1998)
- Twisted Sisters (4 issues, 1994)

=== Reprint titles ===
- Alley Oop (1990–1995)
- Armed and Dangerous by Mezzo and Pirus (originally Les Désarmés)
- Flash Gordon (1990 – c. 1995)
- Krazy Kat (1990–1991)
- Li'l Abner (1988–1999)
- Nancy (1989–1991)
- Nard n' Pat (1978, 1981)
- Phoebe & the Pigeon People (1979–1981)
- The Spirit (various editions, 1974, 1977–1992)
- Steve Canyon (1983–1992)
- The Yellow Kid (1995)
- Zot! (1996–1998)

== Artists and authors associated with Kitchen Sink ==
- Doug Allen
- Mike Baron
- Simon Bisley
- Eddie Campbell
- Al Capp
- Matt Coyle
- Robert Crumb
- Howard Cruse
- Robert Triptow
- Kim Deitch
- Will Elder
- Will Eisner
- Neil Gaiman
- Jean “Moebius” Giraud
- Don Glassford
- Justin Green
- Denis Kitchen
- Harvey Kurtzman
- Carol Lay
- Jay Lynch
- Joe Matt
- Scott McCloud
- Dave McKean
- Jim Mitchell
- Alan Moore
- James O'Barr
- Wendel Pugh
- Trina Robbins
- Mark Schultz
- Art Spiegelman
- Reed Waller
- Bruce Walthers
- S. Clay Wilson
- Kate Worley
- Catherine Yronwode

== See also ==
- Comic Book Legal Defense Fund
