= Life on Another Planet =

Graphic novel by Will Eisner

- Cover of Life on Another Planet (2009), art by Paul Buckley
- Created by: Will Eisner

Publication information
- Publisher: Kitchen Sink Press
- Schedule: Irregular
- Formats: Original material for the series has been published as a strip in the comics anthology(s) Spirit Magazine and Will Eisner Quarterly.
- Genre: Science fiction
- Publication date: October 1978 – December 1980
- Number of issues: 8

Creative team
- Writer(s): Will Eisner
- Artist(s): Will Eisner
- Letterer(s): Will Eisner
- Colorist(s): Andre LeBlanc (hardcover)
- Editor(s): Denis Kitchen

Reprints
- Collected editions
- Signal from Space: ISBN 0-87816-014-0
- Life on Another Planet: ISBN 0-87816-370-0

Life on Another Planet, also known as Signal from Space, is a science fiction graphic novel by Will Eisner dealing with the social and political consequences of a first contact with an extraterrestrial civilization. It was first serialized in The Spirit and later collected into a single volume.

== Plot ==
An artificial radio signal from Barnard's Star listing prime numbers (although the term "prime" is never used in the story) is received at the Mesa Radio Astronomy Observatory. One of the radio-astronomers is a Russian spy and tries to inform his superiors; however he is uncovered by his fellows and subsequently killed. The CIA hires James Bludd, a prominent astrophysicist, to try to understand what is going on.

Several plotlines follow and intertwine, most of them centering on personal greed. News of the extraterrestrial message leaks to the outside world, with different consequences. A bum and a waitress build a cult, calling themselves the Star People, which seeks to find a new home on the Barnard's planet. Multinational, a corporation, decides to invest money into the cult, in order to have an easy to manipulate spaceship crew ready to take possession of the inhabited planet on behalf of the company. A dying biologist, Dr.Crowben, decides to push on the creation of plant-human hybrids biologically suited to the planet environment, which also falls within the scope of Multinational's plan.

Meanwhile, the two surviving astrophysicists have been abducted by the KGB, and Bludd learns that Russians plan to answer to the signal using neutrinos. The international situation further complicates when a small fictional African state, Sidiami, burdened by debts with other countries, decides to "secede from planet Earth" and declares itself a colony of the planet around Barnard. The "Star People" decide to relocate in Sidiami, and the Multinational starts plans to launch a probe towards the Barnard's planet from there. James Bludd finds himself implicated in the ongoing struggle between the USA, the Multinational and the "Star People" to get advantage of the situation.

At the end, the space probe is launched towards the Barnard's planet. Bludd, convinced that humankind is not ready for contact with aliens, has sabotaged it and after a while makes it explode with the aid of a remote control. When later, in the observatory, a new possible artificial extraterrestrial signal is received from space, Bludd destroys all evidence of it with a smile.

== Publication history ==
The story was first published in serial form, under the overall title Life on Another Planet, as eight black and white 16-page chapters appearing in Kitchen Sink Press's Spirit Magazine from issue #19 (October 1978) to issue #26 (December 1980). It was originally collected in colour in 1983 under the title Signal from Space and later republished in black and white, with its original title, by various companies.

=== Collected editions ===
It was originally collected as a color hardcover by Kitchen Sink Press as Signal from Space (November 1983, ISBN 0-87816-014-0) and then later as a black and white softcover, titled Life on Another Planet, by various companies including Kitchen Sink (December 1996, ISBN 0-87816-370-0), DC Comics' Will Eisner Library (June 2000, ISBN 1-56389-677-X) and W. W. Norton & Company (September 2009, ISBN 0-393-32812-0)

== Themes ==
This was … an attempt to produce a graphic novel that was constructed in the same structure as a classic literary work. By taking what would be a science-fiction plot and treating it from a more humanistic viewpoint, I hoped to come up with a book that would deserve adult interest.

— Will Eisner

Life on Another Planet has been called by James Morrow, "a kind of science fictional Bonfire of the Vanities." The overall tone is pessimistic, the whole plot turning around the greed of the various characters and the struggle between their conflicting interests. Despite the title, the novel is indeed thin on science fiction, the signal from space being more of a MacGuffin to ignite the story. Eisner himself declared that he was never enthusiastic about science fiction, but "wanted to prove that it could work as a graphic novel."
