= Peter James Spielmann =

American journalist

Peter James Spielmann (born 1952) is a veteran of the foreign service of The Associated Press, and was an editor and supervisor on AP's North America desk. He taught at Columbia University's Graduate School of Journalism from 1989–93, and from 2001–07.

Spielmann is a member of the editorial board of the quarterly Journal of Human Rights He has been a public speaker on human rights and journalism issues at many venues, including the Nieman Foundation for Journalism at Harvard; New York University; Fordham University School of Law; Purchase College; and the Foreign Press Center in New York City.

== Career ==
He began his career in journalism working for alternative newsweeklies—the New Times in Tucson, Arizona, and The Bugle-American in Milwaukee, Wisconsin. Spielmann earned a B.A. at the University of Wisconsin–Milwaukee, then freelanced for magazines and newspapers and wrote the book The Life Insurance Conspiracy (1979). After earning an M.S. from Columbia University's Graduate School of Journalism in 1984, Spielmann worked as an investigative editor for the CBS Evening News, and joined AP’s International Desk the following year.

Spielmann was an AP correspondent at the United Nations for five years. He contributed chapters to the book A Global Agenda: Issues before the United Nations (1993). From 1993-1999, Spielmann was the AP news editor and correspondent for the South Pacific, based in Sydney, Australia, dispatched on other assignments including Seoul, South Korea, Brussels in 1999 to cover NATO at the end of the Kosovo crisis; and Antarctica.

== Fellowships ==
- Pew Gatekeeper Fellow for studies in South Africa, 2002
- Dart Fellow in Journalism and Trauma, 2002.
- Fulbright Senior Specialist in journalism at American University of Kuwait: "International Reporting: Special Topics.", 2008.
- Pew Gatekeeper Fellow for a fact-finding trip to Peru, 2009.
