= Home Grown Funnies =

1971 underground comic book

- The cover of the 12th printing of Home Grown Funnies, art by Robert Crumb.

Publication information
- Publisher: Kitchen Sink Press
- Schedule: Sixteen printings
- Format: One-shot
- Genre: Underground Satire
- Publication date: January 1971
- No. of issues: 1

Creative team
- Written by: Robert Crumb
- Artist(s): Robert Crumb

Collected editions
- The Complete Crumb Comics #8: The Death of Fritz the Cat: ISBN 1-56097-076-6

Home Grown Funnies is a single-issue underground comic book written and illustrated by Robert Crumb. Containing stories with staple Crumb characters Whiteman, the Snoid, and Angelfood McSpade, Home Grown Funnies went through sixteen printings by Kitchen Sink Press, selling at least 160,000 copies, and has been referred to as one of Crumb's longest-lived comics.

== Publication history ==
The comic was originally published in January 1971, and underwent fifteen consecutive printings.

Home Grown Funnies Print Runs
Printing(s)	Issues
1st	10,000
2nd	20,000
3rd–8th	10,000
9th–11th	5,000
12th	10,000
13th	5,000
14th–16th	est. 5,000

== Contents ==
Stories in Home Grown Funnies
Story	Character	Writer/Artist
"Maryjane"	Maryjane	Robert Crumb
"Backwater Blues"	Angelfood McSpade (billed as Angelfood McDevilsfood)	"
"Whiteman Meets Bigfoot"	Whiteman	"
"The Desperate Character Writhes Again!"	R. Crumb	"

== Reception ==
M. Thomas Fox of underground comix database Comixjoint gave Home Grown Funnies a 10/10 score, rating the writing as "brilliant" and the illustration as "exceptional". Fox added that "[t]he impressive longevity of Home Grown Funnies (16 printings and 160,000 copies sold in 30+ years) is a testament to the alluring power of Robert Crumb's 22-page epic love story, 'Whiteman Meets Bigfoot'. In this classic but unusually plotted (for Crumb) tragicomedy, a middle-class family man falls in love with a female Bigfoot in remote mountain territory and forsakes everything to fulfill his destiny with her".
