= Megaton Man =

- First crossover appearance: The Savage Dragon vs. The Savage Megaton Man Special

Publication information
- Publisher: Kitchen Sink Press (1984–1990); Image Comics (1994); Fiasco Comics (1995–1996)
- First appearance: Megaton Man #1 (Kitchen Sink Press, Nov. 1984)
- Created by: Don Simpson

In-story information
- Alter ego: Trent Phloog
- Team affiliations: The VW Gang
- Notable aliases: Man of Molecules, Megaton Lad
- Abilities: Flight; Superhuman strength and durability; "Megaton" vision (X-ray vision)

Megaton Man (Trent Phloog) is a satirical superhero created by cartoonist Don Simpson. A parody of the superhero genre, Megaton Man is a gigantically-muscled but dim-witted oaf who starred in Simpson's cheerfully absurd stories.

== Publication history ==
Megaton Man is also the title of the creator-owned comic book series (published by Kitchen Sink Press beginning in 1984) Simpson wrote and drew, in which the character first appeared and starred. The original Megaton Man series ran for ten issues, but the character was later revived in a limited series, The Return of Megaton Man, and a series of one-shot issues spun off from the concept.

In 1994, Simpson left Kitchen Sink to form his own company, Fiasco Comics, through which Simpson self-published his new title Bizarre Heroes, featuring Megaton Man (and many members of his old supporting cast) as part of a large ensemble cast. Bizarre Heroes ended when Fiasco went out of business during the mid-1990s contraction of the American comics industry, but Megaton Man and the rest of the Bizarre Heroes went on to appear in several projects published by Image Comics.

== Character ==
Trent Phloog lives in Megatropolis, a futuristic city in Michigan, United States, and he makes his living as the superhero Megaton Man, otherwise known as "The Man of Molecules". Whenever he says the magic word "Overkill", he explodes. Megaton Man's costume is metallic blue, with yellow gloves and boots. His allies include X-Ray Boy and Yarn Man, who both assist Megaton Man in battles against his arch foes, Bad Guy and Bulky Guy.

The origins of Megaton Man's powers remain unknown, but the comic suggests two possibilities: he was either bitten by a radioactive frog, or he was the result of a military megasoldier program. When he first gained his powers, Megaton Man was known as Megaton Lad and he had a sidekick called Plutonium Pup. When Plutonium Pup died on his 21st birthday, Phloog changed his name to Megaton Man.

Trent Phloog is married to Stella Starlight, who is the superheroine known as Earth Mother, and they have one child. In recent times, Megaton Man has discovered other incarnations of himself that were active in the past or are active in the present. These include Golden Age Megaton Man, Silver-Age Megaton Man, and a Russian Megaton Man whose costume is red. Outside Megatropolis, Megaton Man is allied to The Phantom Jungle Girl. Villains outside Megatropolis include Irving the Living Cactus, and the Tomb Team, a band of supernatural villains including the Bride of Frankenstein and Dracula's Daughter.

== Supporting cast ==
=== X-Ray Boy ===
There are two incarnations of X-Ray Boy. The first, Larry Barton, is Megaton Man's sidekick and possesses X-ray vision derives from his oversized glasses. His powers inadvertently burnt his left arm off, resulting in him using a prosthetic. When asked to give up the goggles, Larry agreed, as he had gained the goggles' powers innately.

The 1980s X-Ray Boy was Preston Percy. Hurt by being dropped at a young age, he became evil and formed a group of supervillains known as the Tomb Team. Both versions of X-Ray Boy are heavy smokers.

=== Yarn Man ===
Yarn Man (Bing Gloom) was a member of the Megatropolis Quartet, but is now part of the VW Gang. Yarn Man is so-called because his entire body is made of yarn. Unlike other members of the VW Gang, Yarn Man is the only other superhero who has his own sidekick (Kozmik Kat) and his own personal foe, Irving the Living Cactus (see below).

=== The Phantom Jungle Girl ===
Donna Blank works as an activist in Detroit, Michigan, but when trouble strikes, she becomes The Phantom Jungle Girl. A long-time ally of Megaton Man, she is also known for discovering the secret of Preston Percy and the Tomb Team. Her boyfriend is the Meddler, a living corpse dedicated to defending Detroit.

=== Cowboy Gorilla ===
A talking gorilla from the state of Texas, Cowboy Gorilla was the fourth member of the Megatropolis Quartet. Since the group disbanded, he continues to aid Megaton Man frequently as part of the VW Gang.

=== Gower Goose and Kozmik Kat ===
Two anthropomorphic animals, Gower Goose and Kozmik Kat are the mascots to Megaton Man and his friends and members of the VW Gang.

- Kozmik Kat is a feline version of Megaton Man, who speaks fluent English and will gladly attack any predators, within reason. He does not believe in violence towards women, and is more laid back than other heroes. Additionally, he is Yarn Man's sidekick and prefers the "megahero" business as he is descended from a family of alley-cats, which did not appeal to him.
- Gower Goose is a cowardly goose and a heavy drinker. Although not tough on the side of action, he feels better suited to doing odd jobs for his friends, such as cleaning the dishes and mopping the floor. A good friend of X-Ray Boy, Gower Goose has also had a crush on Mooncat, a member of Tomb Team. Outside his megahero image, Gower Goose is a radio presenter for the radio station WUCK.

== Teen Idols ==
As the X-Thems are a parody of X-Men, the Teen Idols are a parody of the Teen Titans. Little is known about their background, except that they operate in Novi, Michigan, and reports say that they have recently disappeared.

== Other Heroes of the Fiascoverse ==
=== Anti-Matter Woman ===
Anti-Matter Woman (Andrea Revell) is another superheroine in Megatropolis. Originally called Negative Woman, her name was altered to avoid confusion with DC Comics character Valentina Vostok.

=== Captain Keystone ===
Little is known about Captain Keystone, but he is known to be an elder superhero of Megatropolis. He is a tutor to all superheroes in Michigan.

=== Earth Mother ===
Formerly "See-Thru Girl", Earth Mother is a superheroine in Megatropolis who is often accompanied by Miss Megaton Man. In reality, she is Stella Starlight, wife to Megaton Man. The change of name was because the original was too risqué.

=== The Meddler ===
Little is known about this bandaged mummy-style vigilante save that he is a living corpse. He has had a relationship with the Phantom Jungle Girl.

=== Pteranoman ===
Liberal senator Pete Teriano wears a costume which makes him look like an anthropomorphic Pterosaur. He is assisted by Lisa Kopernick and the Cave Babes.

=== The Slick ===
A young vigilante armed with a gun that shoots an adhesive substance.

== Foes of Megaton Man ==
=== The Kickstand Kid ===
The first villain Megaton Man encountered after changing from Megaton Lad, the Kickstand Kid was a young boy in an enormous robotic body with guns built into almost every part of the machine. As bullets have no effect on Megaton Man, the Kickstand Kid was easily defeated.

=== Dr. Software ===
A foe of the now-disbanded Megatropolis Quartet, Dr. Software plagued Megaton Man frequently, and still does following the disbanding of his rivals' "megahero" team. Dr. Software was also responsible for the capture and holding to ransom of a newspaper journalist, Pamela Jointly.

=== Bad Guy and Bulky Guy ===
Two clumsy cousins, Bad Guy and Bulky Guy are both behemoths residing in Megatropolis, who cause as much havoc as possible for the various incarnations of Megaton Man. They have frequently been defeated by not only Megaton Man, but Golden Age Megaton Man, Miss Megaton Man and Anti-Matter Woman.

=== Irving the Living Cactus ===
Not a foe of Megaton Man himself, but an enemy of Yarn Man. Irving is able to use his spikes to pin himself to Yarn Man and slowly rip his fibre-body apart. He was supposedly killed by an electric shock from X-Ray Boy, but was merely dehydrated. When he was thrown into a river filled with chemically-polluted water, Irving was resurrected and swore revenge against the VW Gang.

=== The Tomb Team ===
A team of supernatural entities residing in the catacombs of Ypsilanti Cemetery in Michigan, the Tomb Team can all only speak German, and are led by Megaton Mans' 1980s sidekick, Preston Percy.

Members of the Tomb Team include:

- Forbidden Frankenstein - A purple behemoth who previously battled solo with Megaton Man.
- The Bride of Frankenstein - Beautiful wife of the above, who can speak English as well as German.
- Dracula's Daughter - Green-skinned daughter of Dracula, who is somehow able to move about in daylight. Since the Draculas emigrated to Cleveland from Transylvania, Dracula's Daughter has constantly pestered her father, and it is her vampire bite that places Cowboy Gorilla out of action for a time.
- An unnamed Werewolf (deceased).
- The Mooncat - A spoiled nurse who became a demoness after giving a bad image to The Phantom Jungle Girl in a brief superhero gig.
