= Comix Book =

Underground comic book series

- Comix Book #1 (Oct. 1974), artwork by Peter Poplaski

Publication information
- Publisher: Marvel Comics; Kitchen Sink Press
- Schedule: Irregular
- Format: Ongoing series
- Genre: Underground
- Publication date: Oct. 1974 – July 1976
- No. of issues: 5

Creative team
- Created by: Denis Kitchen
- Artist(s): Joel Beck, Howard Cruse, Kim Deitch, Justin Green, Will Fowler, Gary Hallgren, Denis Kitchen, Trina Robbins, Art Spiegelman, Skip Williamson, S. Clay Wilson
- Editor: Denis Kitchen

Comix Book is an underground comic book series published from 1974 to 1976, originally by Marvel Comics. It was the first comic of this type to be published by a mainstream publisher. Edited by Denis Kitchen, Comix Book featured work by such underground luminaries as Justin Green, Kim Deitch, Trina Robbins, Art Spiegelman, and S. Clay Wilson. While it did not depict the explicit content that was often featured in underground comix, it was more socially relevant than anything Marvel had previously published.

== Publication history ==
In 1973, Marvel publisher Stan Lee became attracted to the energy and cutting-edge art styles of the underground comix movement (which, ironically, by this period was already beginning to wane). Interested in capitalizing on the genre, Lee approached artist and Kitchen Sink Press publisher Denis Kitchen about packaging an underground-style publication for Marvel. Lee requested only that contributors would submit significantly less explicit work, appropriate for newsstands sales. Kitchen, eager to broaden the economic and distribution opportunities for underground cartoonists, agreed to Lee's proposal.

Lee, apprehensive about push-back from fans and distributors, insisted that Comix Book not carry the Marvel name, instead being released by Magazine Management Co. (a Marvel Comics company). Lee himself was only credited on the masthead as "instigator". He and Kitchen agreed to produce a black-and-white oversize magazine similar to that of the contemporaneous Marvel imprint Curtis Magazines. As with the Curtis publications, the format allowed Marvel to dispense with the restrictions of the Comics Code Authority, thereby creating a freer creative space more akin to the no-holds-barred ethos of the underground. In addition, like most underground comics, Comix Book carried no advertising. Kitchen was also able to win a number of unprecedented concessions for his contributors, including the return of all artwork, and eventually allowing artists to keep their copyrights.

Comix Book #1 was launched with a cover-date of Oct. 1974. In addition to comics, issues of Comix Book usually featured text pieces like Kitchen editorials, interviews, and a letters page. Comix Book either failed to find its audience, was mishandled by baffled newsstand distributors, or both. Lee cancelled the book when issue #3 hit the newsstands.

Kitchen, however, had assembled two additional issues. After a year of negotiations, he persuaded Marvel to let his own Kitchen Sink Press publish issues #4 and 5 in 1976.

The Best of Comix Book: When Marvel Went Underground collection was published in December 2013 by the Kitchen Sink Books imprint of Dark Horse Comics. The collection contains an essay by James Vance and introductions by both Kitchen and Stan Lee. In his introduction, Stan Lee calls Comix Book "totally original and totally unique, one of the most courageous things I've ever done".
