= Colin O'Meara =

Canadian voice actor (born 1963)

- Born: August 30, 1963 (age 62); Kingston, Ontario, Canada
- Occupations: Actor, voice actor
- Years active: 1985–2006

Colin O'Meara (born August 30, 1963) is a Canadian former voice actor. He provided the voice of the character Tintin from The Adventures of Tintin television series. Other roles include Sailor Moon, Rupert, Road to Avonlea, 6teen, one episode of Police Academy, and one episode of Harry and His Bucket Full of Dinosaurs, as well as voicing Wrench in the animated television show Cadillacs and Dinosaurs.
