= Xenozoic Tales =

Alternative comic book by Mark Schultz

- Xenozoic Tales Volume 1: After the End, published by Dark Horse Comics.

Publication information
- Publisher: Kitchen Sink Press
- Schedule: Irregular
- Publication date: February 1987 – October 1996
- No. of issues: 14

Creative team
- Created by: Mark Schultz
- Written by: Mark Schultz
- Artist(s): Mark Schultz; Steve Stiles

Xenozoic Tales is an alternative comic book by American artist Mark Schultz, set in a post-apocalyptic future. Originally published by Kitchen Sink Press, the series began in 1986 with the story "Xenozoic!" which was included in the horror comics anthology Death Rattle #8. This was shortly followed by Xenozoic Tales #1 in February 1987. Kitchen Sink published 14 issues between 1987 and 1996 and it has since been reprinted by several publishers, including Marvel Comics, Dark Horse Comics, IDW Publishing and Flesk Publications.

The series was well-received and in the early 1990s it won four Harvey Awards and three Eisner Awards. Despite this, issues started to be released further apart, eventually ceasing mid-story arc in issue #14.

Xenozoic Tales also proved moderately successful under the title Cadillacs and Dinosaurs and spawned an animated series on CBS, an arcade game from Capcom, a Sega CD video game from Rocket Science Games, action figures, candy bars, and a Twilight 2000 system role-playing game. The comic book reprints from Kitchen Sink and Marvel, and the continuation from Topps Comics, also used the Cadillacs and Dinosaurs name. The title Cadillacs and Dinosaurs and the likenesses of classic Cadillac automobiles were used with the consent of General Motors, which holds the phrase "Cadillacs and Dinosaurs" as a trademark and has licensed it for the comic books, the video game and the animated series.

Schultz's illustrated novella, Storms at Sea, published in 2015 with Flesk Publications, includes details which appear to provide a back-history of the circumstances that led to the creating of the world as shown in Xenozoic Tales.

== Publication history ==
=== Xenozoic Tales (Kitchen Sink Press): 1987–1996 ===
The original publication of Xenozoic Tales ran irregularly from 1987 until 1996, often with multiple years taking place between issues. The final issue, #14, ends in the middle of a story arc. While there is no time-frame, in 2012 Flesk Publications revealed they had tentative plans with Mark Schultz to create an additional 80 pages of story to complete the current story arc. The most recent mention of this is in the last pages of the Flesk collection Xenozoic where it states: "The adventures of Hannah Dundee & Jack Tenrec will continue. Look for more mystery, mayhem, & intrigue in future Xenozoic stories!"

=== Cadillacs and Dinosaurs (Marvel Comics): 1990–1991 ===
In 1990, under the banner of Epic Comics, Marvel Comics began reprinting Xenozoic Tales in full color under the title Cadillacs and Dinosaurs. These editions had completely new covers, but only the first six issues were reprinted and the series ceased publication in April 1991. As of yet, these colorized versions have never been released in a collected form.

=== Cadillacs and Dinosaurs (Topps Comics): 1994 ===
Topps Comics' Cadillacs and Dinosaurs (vol. 2) #1 Special Collectors Edition, with cover art by dinosaur artist William Stout.

In 1994, Topps Comics began running their own continuation of Xenozoic Tales, also under the title Cadillacs and Dinosaurs. The series only ran for one year, in which they released nine issues. The stories were designed to complement the original series, taking place between in the midpoint of the story "Lords of the Earth" in Xenozoic Tales #10, right after Wilhelmina Scharnhorst is elected governor, but before Jack has been driven into exile. In the original story, that moment lasts for only a few minutes, but Topps Comics sought the permission of Mark Schultz to turn it into a "moment that stretches". While Mark Schultz did not write or draw any of the comics released by Topps, he was consulted on some of the story arcs to make sure they were kept as true to his vision as possible.

The series ran three main story arcs over the course of nine issues before "going on hiatus" right before the release of Xenozoic Tales issue #13. A fourth storyline titled "Hammer of the Gods" was in the works, being drawn by David Roach, but was never released.

== Story ==
In the storyline, Earth has been ravaged by pollution and natural disasters of all sorts in the 1990s. To escape this, humanity built vast underground cities in which they lived for approximately 500 years. Upon emerging, the humans found that the world had been reclaimed by previously extinct lifeforms (most spectacularly, dinosaurs and prehistoric mammals). In the new 'Xenozoic' era, technology is extremely limited and those with mechanical skills command a great deal of respect and influence.

The two main characters of the series are mechanic Jack Tenrec and scientist/love interest, Hannah Dundee. Tenrec operates a garage in which he restores cars, particularly Cadillacs. Given that the post-apocalyptic world no longer possesses the ability to refine oil, Tenrec modifies his cars to run on dinosaur guano. These cars, of course, are frequently chased by rampaging dinosaurs in pulp style action-adventure stories.

Other characters include various criminals, politicians, scientists, and inventors who populate the dystopian world of tomorrow. There is also a race of reptilian humanoids called the Grith who cannot speak in a human language but instead communicate by spelling words with Scrabble tiles. These creatures have befriended Tenrec, and apparently have the ability to communicate telepathically with the dinosaurs. Added into the mix is Hermes, a half-tamed Allosaurus Jack raised, and who basically acts as the most threatening guard dog one could ask for.

== Characters ==
- Jack Tenrec – an old blood mechanic who runs a garage. Old bloods are a group of people who repair machines that were left over from the great cataclysm that forced humanity to live underground. Despite his gruff and stubborn behavior, he is considered leader by the people in the City in the Sea (formerly Manhattan) more than their governors; he starts an on/off relationship with the beautiful Wasoon ambassador and scientist Hannah Dundee.
- Hannah Dundee – a beautiful scientist and ambassador from Wasoon (formerly Washington, D.C.). She came to the City in the Sea in order to build relations with her people, as not many trust them. Over the course of the comics, she becomes the love interest of Jack Tenrec despite their different views on things.
- Hermes – an Allosaurus who Jack raised after his mother was killed by poachers; although he can be vicious to others, he is gentle with Jack and Hannah. He first appeared when he saved his beloved master after he was being threatened by one of the Terhunes.
- Remfro Rhynchus – a reclusive yet obsessed oddball expert on zekes and their flying patterns, he soon builds an engineless plane that relies on thermal updrafts to keep afloat. He also befriends Hannah.
- Mustapha Cairo – an engineer and a mechanic who is a good friend to Jack. He becomes one of their allies in their fight for survival in the post-apocalyptic world overrun by dinosaurs and saber-toothed tigers. He is suave and level headed who does what he can do best in the tumultuous times in the city.
- Kirgo – an elderly, dry witted mechanic who is a friend to Jack. He seems to know why some people hate Jack and want him dead.
- Sheba – a wild card mechanic who sticks around the garage and has a close relationship with Kirgo.
- Phu-tsering – a mechanic who is the kennel-master of Hermes who has a keen intellect and humble personality.
- Ryder Corbett – an expert tracker who is a rival to Jack Tenrec. He is intelligent and crafty. Able to make a rifle powerful enough to kill a Shivat; also has a robotic prosthetic arm with two claws that looks like a Shivat hand. He is killed later by a mutated Shivat after a fight in the Garage against Tenrec.
- The Terhune Clan – a family of poachers who are the enemies of Jack Tenrec; they have tried many times to kill him, but always fail.
  - Mother Terhune - leader of The Terhune Clan, she is small, old, and frail compared to her three sons. She is intelligent, short-tempered, and violent. She seems to hate Tenrec and Dundee. She is also known to smoke many cigars.
  - Hammer Terhune – an overweight poacher who despises Jack Tenrec. He is dumb as a stump but makes up for his ruthless leadership skills. He tries to kill Jack and Hannah many times, but always fails. He has two brothers named Wrench and Vice. He was later shot by Hannah after he took Jack hostage while escaping from an enraged woolly mammoth.
  - Wrench Terhune – Hammer's younger brother who is the middle child of the Terhune family. Previously, Wrench and some other poachers had murdered a Wasoon patrol. In the first issue, they plotted to kill the visiting Wasoon ambassador, in the belief that the Wasoons were coming after the murderers. When Jack intervened, Wrench tried to kill him, but Hermes came to Jack's rescue and bit Wrench to death before flinging his corpse through a window.
  - Vice Terhune – the youngest, most arrogant brother of the Terhune family. Like his two older brothers, he is a poacher and has a huge dislike of Jack Tenrec. He appears in two issues, the first when he finds an old case which he believes has gold in it, but later discovers that it has old American dollars instead. Later he turns to thieving, after the City in the Sea imposes a hunting license on all hunters.
  - Mikla Von Ermine – Vice's raving girlfriend who is obsessed with Vice, despite his domineering behavior and rival to Hannah.
  - Black Elmer, Sherman Spurgeon and Brick Flinders – Henchmen of Vice who also have a particular hatred towards Jack.
- Wilhelmina Scharnhorst – the leader of the "Moles", a group of people who search the ancient ruins in and under the City in the Sea. She is a large woman who is determined, disdainful, masculine, pragmatic, corrupt, and condescending. She despises the old blood mechanics, as she believes that they are nothing but nuisances who stand in the way of progress. She runs for Governor of the City, after the death of Gov. Julian Gorgostamos.
- Lord Drumheller – Leader of Wassoon, he is cunning yet ambitious in his endeavor to gain knowledge of the world. Even if it means doing morally grey acts to achieve them.
- Chorthis Rouge –Drumheller's lieutenant and advisor who is often times a voice of reason for Drumheller.
- Aduwa Steptoe – an elderly enigmatic witch-like figure in Wassoon who is a Mechanic. She holds a lot of influence in Wassoon and opposes to Drumheller's goals who allies herself with Jack, but Jack holds his suspicions for her.
- Lord Balclutha – known as Balclutha the Hunter, he is an experienced hunter and aristocrat in Wassoon who is at first a rival to Jack, but gradually becomes a close friend in Jack's endeavors.
- The Governors – The council who rules over The City in The Sea.
  - Gov. Nock – The figurehead to the Governors who acts as a "yes-man" to Scharnhorst.
  - Gov. Toulouse – One of the Governors who is the most neutral and laid back in his ideals with rare hints of any ambition.
  - Gov. Lorraine Dahlgren – The most flamboyant and savvy of the Governors, who may have had a thing of Jack Tenrec. She aids Jack's and Hannah's escape from the city.
  - Gov. Julian Gorgostamos – The deceased member of the quartet of Governors. He is a overweight man who seemed to be a kind and well-spoken to Hannah, but is later to be revealed as a cunning and cruel man who planned on luring Hannah and Jack into a trap only for them to leave him at the trap for hours. He is later killed by the Grith and his remains are found by Jack and Hannah. He has a bespectacled son named Julian the Younger who becomes an assistant to Scharnhorst.
- Derek Wister – Director of the Calhoon Mines, he is known to be a sly but cowardly man who seems to antagonize Jack.
- Big Red – Amaiza, better known as Big Red is a antagonist turned ally to Jack who is the leader of a female led biker gang that raids and pillages anything in their path. She is tough, ruthless, and charming with a leather uniform and long red hair, hence her name. She and Jack have a small affair, but Jack ends it quickly. She helps Jack fight The Terhune Clan and their plans in taking over a Vault that is Big Red's home.
- Dr. Phileas Fessenden – a crazed scientist who strives to discover the secrets of what caused Slithers to exist, instead he turned himself and his fellow researchers into monstrous brain creatures that have telepathic abilities in the Great Swamps. Their tentacles wrap around their skeletons like ivy to ride on top of their former bodies. Though Phileas rides on a Shivat skeleton. He is killed when Felicia put him out of his misery when he was blown up by TNT.
- Felicia Fessenden – daughter of the mad scientist, Phileas and old friend to Jack. She is head-strong researcher but desperate in finding her father when he became a mutated brain creature.
- The Grith – a mysterious race of intelligent lizard men who cannot communicate in a human language, but can communicate with Scrabble tiles. They are said to be descendants of an unknown species of dinosaur. They are allies with Jack for some unknown reason and, later, they ally with Hannah as well.
  - Hobbs – Jack's contact in the Grith. He appears when Hannah was taken by the Grith, and then informs them that a settlement is about to be destroyed by an earthquake.
  - Wild Child – a human teenager who was raised by the Grith who wears a loincloth and animal hide boots. He wandered away from his home when he was only three years old and was then attacked by a pack of cave hyenas, but was saved by the Grith, who then raised him as one of their own. Ten years later, Hannah discovered Wild Child and tried to take him back, but eventually knew that he belonged with the Grith. Hannah reluctantly told the boy's mother that she had found nothing.

== Prehistoric animals ==
In the Xenozoic Tales universe, the humans have developed their own names for prehistoric creatures. Below are the names used in the comics and the real-life creatures they refer to:

- Slither – a generic term for any dinosaur or prehistoric reptile.
- Bonehead – Pachycephalosaurus. A species of pachycephalosaur with a bony skull on its head.
- Cave bear – same name. Large and mostly peaceful bear, though dangerous if threatened.
- Cutter – Allosaurus. A mid-sized carnivore, relatively common. Hermes, Jack's half-tame dinosaur, is a juvenile.
- Crawler / Britomart – Ankylosaurus. Peaceful but dangerous plant eating ankylosaurs with body armor and a club tail.
- Harvestman / Cogspider – giant opilione. Lives deep underground in huge colonies. If exposed to pressure at sea level, it will slowly die.
- Hornbill – Parasaurolophus. A peaceful and gentle species of hadrosaurs, travels in herds.
- Horses – one of the few modern animals still existing in the Xenozoic Era, they are used as mounts by many of the surviving humans.
- Mack – a general term for ceratopsians, generally used for Triceratops or Styracosaurus. Easily startled herd animal.
- Mammoth / Big Woolly / Tusker – Woolly Mammoth who are ill-tempered elephants. Hannah tried to catch one, and in a rage it followed them back to Jack's garage, before being killed in a run-in with a Mack herd.
- Sabre-Tooth Cat – Smilodon. Cats with knife-like canines, hunts animals such as Macks and Mammoths.
- Sambuck – Apatosaurus. Large sauropod, lives in herds and startles easily.
- Sailback – a general term used for sailed synapsids such as Dimetrodon and Edaphosaurus.
- Shark – Cretoxyrhina. A species of shark that is mostly found in the waters surrounding the City in the Sea.
- Shivat – Tyrannosaurus rex. The largest carnivore in the world, sticks to the higher regions. Mates for life. A mutated specimen possessed chameleonlike abilities and an ultra-tough hide. Its genitals are highly prized on the black market.
- Shrike – Deinonychus. Small pack dromaeosaurs. Also referred to as a Harrier.
- Tree Grazer – Brachiosaurus. The largest herbivore in the world, lives in small herds.
- Tri-colored Sambuck – Diplodocus. Large sauropod, lives in herds and startles easily much like Sambucks.
- Thresher – Mosasaur. Large sea hunter, possesses sonar.
- Triton – Trilobite. An early arthropod, in real life they were usually 3–6 cm long, but in the comic they can grow as long as 2 metres.
- Wahochuck – Stegosaurus. A fairly common animal.
- Zeke – Pteranodon. Scavenger sensitive to underwater predators. A flock was drawn to the city to warn of attacks on fishing boats by Threshers.

== Locations ==
The setting of Xenozoic Tales is along the Eastern coast of North America during the mid-27th century, most of America's cities having been destroyed during the Great Cataclysm, with a few surviving:

- The City in the Sea – the remains of Manhattan and the series' main setting. As its name implies, it consists of several buildings that survived when Manhattan was flooded during the Great Cataclysm. The Empire State Building was one of the surviving buildings.
  - Jack's Garage – a large garage that is both the home and workshop of Jack Tenrec.
- Wassoon – the home of Hannah Dundee, located in the south and the remains of Washington, D.C. Its people the Wassoon are a tribe of scholars, but they are treated with disdain by many other surviving humans for reasons unknown. They sent Hannah to the City in the Sea with the hopes of gaining access to their library.
- Calhoon Mines – a copper mine located a few days from the City in the Sea. It is where the copper for the City in the Sea is mined; it was once besieged by a man-eating Shivat until it was killed by Jack and Hannah.
- Fessenden's Station - a scientific research station that is a several-days journey from the City in the Sea, deep within the treacherous jungles, and established by Dr. Phileas Fessenden, a scientist highly revered by the city. Jack and Hannah discover the grisly fate of Fessenden and all his staff there, and the place is torched and declared forbidden. The Grith later secretly inform Jack that the abandoned station is the "key to everything".

== Animated television series ==
In 1993 Nelvana adapted Xenozoic Tales into an animated television show for CBS Kids. The show lasted for one season of thirteen episodes. While not a direct adaptation of the comic book series, many of the episodes featured stories taken directly from Xenozoic Tales. The show has developed a cult following and is currently available to watch in the U.S. through Amazon Video.

== Collected editions ==
The original series has been collected multiple times, starting with Kitchen Sink Press in 1989, Dark Horse Comics in 2003, and eventually in a single volume by Flesk Publications in 2013. Flesk also released a limited edition hardcover of the book after raising funds through Kickstarter. An Artists Edition was released by IDW Publishing in August 2013 and contains oversized reprints of the original art from issues #9–14 of the series. While these collections all contain the complete original series written by Mark Schultz, only the Kitchen Sink Press releases contain the backup stories drawn by Steve Stiles, though in 2012 Flesk Publications made it clear they were hunting for the original art from his stories for a future release.

The Epic Comics colorized issues and the Topps Comics series have never been released in collected form.

Trade paperbacks
Title	Publisher	Material collected	Publication date	ISBN
Cadillacs and Dinosaurs	Kitchen Sink Press	Death Rattle #8, Xenozoic Tales #1–4	January 1, 1989	978-0878160709
Dinosaur Shaman	Kitchen Sink Press	Xenozoic Tales #5–8	October 28, 1990	978-0878161188
Time in Overdrive	Kitchen Sink Press	Xenozoic Tales #9–12	July 1, 1993	978-0878162147
Xenozoic Tales Volume 1: After the End	Dark Horse	Death Rattle #8, Xenozoic Tales #1–7	April 30, 2003	978-1569716908
Xenozoic Tales Volume 2: The New World	Dark Horse	Xenozoic Tales #8–14	June 11, 2003	978-1569716915
Xenozoic	Flesk Publications	Death Rattle #8, Xenozoic Tales #1–14	August 1, 2013	978-1933865317
Xenozoic Tales: Artists Edition	IDW	Xenozoic Tales #9–14	July 2013	978-1613776933

== Awards ==
Mark Schultz has won five Harvey Awards for his work on Xenozoic Tales. He won three times for Best Artist or Penciller (1990, 1992, 1993), once for Best Inker (1997), and once for Best Single Issue or Story (Xenozoic Tales #11, 1992).

Xenozoic Tales also received two Eisner Awards: one for Best Short Story (Xenozoic Tales #12 "Two Cities" 1992) and one for Best Black-and-White Series (1991).
