= Bruce Walthers =

American cartoonist

- Born: Bruce Walthers von Alten; 1944 (age 81–82)
- Area: Cartoonist
- Pseudonym: Bruce von Alten
- Notable works: O.K. Comix

Bruce Walthers von Alten (born 1944) is an American underground cartoonist. Also known as Bruce von Alten, Walthers was part of the late-1960s/early-1970s Milwaukee underground comix scene and a member of the Krupp Comics/Kitchen Sink group, which also included Denis Kitchen, Jim Mitchell, Don Glassford, and Wendel Pugh.

In the early 1970s, he regularly created weekly strips for the Wisconsin underground newspaper The Bugle-American, which were subsequently syndicated to about fifty other underground and college newspapers via the Krupp Syndicate. These strips, titled O. K. Comics, frequently featured his trademark character, Oscar Kabibbler, a spherical eyeless nebish who drifted into bizarre and cryptic settings. Walthers was also known for inexplicable blimps emblazoned with mysterious messages. In 1972, he drew two issues of O.K. Comix for Kitchen Sink Press and also contributed to the company's anthology Snarf.
