= Mark Schultz (comics) =

Comic creator

- Born: June 7, 1955 (age 71) near Philadelphia, Pennsylvania, U.S.
- Areas: Writer, Penciller, Inker
- Notable works: Xenozoic Tales

Mark Schultz (/ʃʌlts/; born June 7, 1955) is an American writer and illustrator of books and comics. His most widely recognized work is the creator-owned comic book series Xenozoic Tales, which describes a post-apocalyptic world where dinosaurs and other prehistoric creatures coexist with humans. In 1993, Xenozoic Tales was adapted into an animated series titled Cadillacs and Dinosaurs and a video game of the same name. Schultz's other notable works include various Aliens comic book mini-series published by Dark Horse and a four-year run on the DC Comics series Superman: The Man of Steel. In 2004, Schultz took over the scripting duties of the Prince Valiant comic strip.

== Early life ==
Schultz was born just outside Philadelphia, Pennsylvania, but raised near Pittsburgh. At the age of six, he discovered both comics and classic adventure films, with early favorites being Tarzan and King Kong. As a teenager he was further inspired by such fantasy authors as Edgar Rice Burroughs and Robert E. Howard and the artists who had illustrated their work, including Frank Frazetta, Roy Krenkel, Al Williamson, Wally Wood, Howard Pyle and Joseph Clement Coll.

In 1973, Schultz enrolled in Kutztown University of Pennsylvania. Four years later, after graduating with a Bachelor of Fine Arts degree in painting, he embarked upon a career in advertising illustration, bolstered by such odd jobs as working as a security guard, which he ultimately found unsatisfying. In the early 1980s, Schultz became interested in the burgeoning underground comics scene, which allowed creators to publish stories outside the traditional assembly-line approach of the mainstream comics industry. He also became attracted to the art of the classic stories published by EC Comics in the 1950s. At one point, he took the few boxes of 1960s and early 1970s Marvel and DC comic books he owned to a local comic book store and traded them for a large collection of EC Comics. From then on, Schultz began to hone his illustration style to emulate that of classic EC artists.

== Career ==
Schultz's first published comics work was on a story called "The Sea King", featuring Robert E. Howard's character King Kull, which appeared in Savage Sword of Conan #132, published by Marvel Comics. Schultz inked over pencils by Val Semeiks. Schultz did not actively pursue further work from Marvel, as he was more interested in developing and publishing comics based on his own concepts. Throughout the early 1980s, Schultz would germinate the ideas which would eventually bear fruit as Xenozoic Tales. The characters and stories he created were set in a future time period he dubbed the "Xenozoic Age", in which an unspecified cataclysm had all but wiped out modern human society. The survivors emerged from their underground bunkers to find a world transformed, where prehistoric creatures had once again become the dominant life forms on Earth. The first story set in the Xenozoic Age that Schultz completed was "Mammoth Pitfall", but it would not see publication until Xenozoic Tales #2. The first to be published was "Xenozoic!", which ran in the anthology title Death Rattle #8, published in December 1986 by Kitchen Sink Press.

Since Xenozoic Tales, Schultz has written comics series for a number of publishers, including Dark Horse and DC. Typically these are stories based on company-owned or licensed characters, rather than his own original work.

Schultz created the underwater adventure comics series SubHuman, published by Dark Horse comics.

In 2002, Schultz contributed a number of illustrations to Conan the Cimmerian: Volume 1, a new reprinting of the Conan stories of Robert E. Howard, published by Wandering Star Books. The book has since been reprinted in paperback by Del Rey as The Coming of Conan the Cimmerian. He was also interviewed by Durwin Talon for Panel Discussions, a nonfiction book about the developing movement in sequential art and narrative literature, along with, Will Eisner, Walter Simonson and Mike Mignola.

Since November 1, 2004, he has been the writer for the long-running comic strip, Prince Valiant originally created by Hal Foster. He also wrote the two-issue intercompany crossover Superman & Batman vs. Aliens & Predator.

From 2005 to 2013, Schultz released a series of sketchbooks of his studies and finished works through Flesk Publications, starting with Mark Schultz: Various Drawings in 5 volumes released from 2005 to 2011, followed by Mark Schultz: Carbon in 2013. Also with the publisher, he contributed with other artists to the graphic novel Flesk Prime in 2011, and in 2015 Schultz released an illustrated pulp noir/science fantasy adventure novella Storms at Sea.

In 2010, he wrote three issues of the series The Spirit, spinning-off of the First Wave limited series, intended to create a new universe of non-superpowered characters like Doc Savage, Batman, Black Canary, the Blackhawks, Wildcat, The Avenger, Rima the Jungle Girl and others.

In 2015, Schultz contributed, among other artists, to bring inner illustrations to the tabletop role-playing game Conan: Adventures in an Age Undreamed Of, first published in 2016 by British company Modiphius Entertainment.

== Awards ==
Schultz has been awarded five Harvey Awards, two Eisners, an Inkpot, a Spectrum, and three Haxturs (from the Salon Del Internacional Comic del Principado de Austurias).

== Bibliography ==
=== Kitchen Sink Press ===
- Xenozoic Tales #1–14 (script and art, 1987–1996)
  - A short preview story titled "Xenozoic!" (written and drawn by Schultz) was published in Death Rattle #8 (anthology, 1986)
  - All issues consisted of two to three short stories; starting with Xenozoic Tales #3, one of the stories in each issue featured art by Steve Stiles.
  - The colorized versions of the first six issues of Xenozoic Tales were published under Marvel's Epic imprint as Cadillacs and Dinosaurs #1–6 (1990–1991)
  - Kitchen Sink reprinted two short stories ("Green Air" from issue #6 and "The Growing Pool" from #7) with added 3D effect as Cadillacs and Dinosaurs in 3-D (one-shot, 1992)
  - A spin-off series, written by Roy Thomas and drawn by various artists — with Schultz acting as the consultant — was published by Topps as Cadillacs and Dinosaurs vol. 2 #1–9 (1994)
  - The original 14 issues of Xenozoic Tales (minus the Stiles-drawn stories) and the short story from Death Rattle were collected by Flesk as Xenozoic (tpb, 352 pages, 2010, ISBN 1-933865-31-8)
  - The original artwork of Schultz-drawn stories from issues #9–14 was reproduced in a single volume as Xenozoic Tales: Artist's Edition (hc, 144 pages, IDW Publishing, 2013, ISBN 1-61377-693-4)
- Melody #5 (untitled one-page illustration — part of the "Stripclub Portfolio" segment, 1990)
- Images of Omaha #1: "Some Cats" (one-page illustration in the benefit anthology, 1992)
- Death Rattle vol. 2 #1: "The Probability Chamber" (with Roger Petersen, anthology, 1995)
- The Spirit: The New Adventures #4: "Dr. Broca Von Bitelbaum" (with David Lloyd, anthology, 1998)
  - Collected in Will Eisner's The Spirit Archives Volume 27 (hc, 200 pages, Dark Horse, 2009, ISBN 1-56971-732-X)
  - Collected in Will Eisner's The Spirit: The New Adventures (hc, 240 pages, Dark Horse, 2016, ISBN 1-61655-948-9)

=== DC Comics ===
- Batman: Legends of the Dark Knight #50 (untitled one-page illustration — part of the "Visions of a Legend" segment, 1993)
- Superman:
  - DC One Million Omnibus (hc, 1,080 pages, 2013, ISBN 1-4012-4243-X) includes:
    - Action Comics #1,000,000: "Brave New Hero" (with Ron Lim, 1998)
    - Superman: The Man of Tomorrow #1,000,000: "Future Story" (with Georges Jeanty, 1998) also collected in DC One Million (tpb, 208 pages, 1999, ISBN 1-84023-094-0)
    - DC One Million 80-Page Giant: "In the Age of Solaris' Heroic Rebirth!" (with Georges Jeanty, anthology one-shot, 1999)
  - Superman: The Man of Steel:
    - "King of the World" (with Doug Mahnke, in #87–89, 1999)
    - "A Girl and Her Robot" (with Mike Collins, in #90, 1999)
    - "Nemesis" (with Doug Mahnke, framing sequence only — issue written by John Rozum and drawn by Charlie Adlard, in #91, 1999)
    - "The Sea Beast of Metropolis!" (with Doug Mahnke, in #93, 1999)
    - Superman: The City of Tomorrow Volume 1 (tpb, 466 pages, 2019, ISBN 1-4012-9508-8) includes:
      - "Krypton Lives" (with Doug Mahnke, in #95–97, 1999–2000)
      - "Y2K, Part Four: Thirty Minutes to Oblivion" (with Doug Mahnke, in #98, 2000)
    - Superman: The City of Tomorrow Volume 2 (tpb, 504 pages, 2020, ISBN 1-77950-312-1) includes:
      - "All That Dwell in Dark Waters" (with Pablo Raimondi) and "In the Belly of the Beast" (with Doug Mahnke, in #99, 2000)
      - "Creation Story" (with Doug Mahnke, in #100, 2000)
      - "The Search for Lois: All Fall Down" (with Pablo Raimondi, in #101, 2000)
      - "Critical Condition, Part Three: Inside Superman" (with Doug Mahnke, in #102, 2000)
      - "What He Didn't Do" (with Doug Mahnke, in #103, 2000)
    - Superman: Emperor Joker (tpb, 256 pages, 2007, ISBN 1-4012-1193-3) includes:
      - "Arkham, Part Three: No Axioms" (with Doug Mahnke, in #104, 2000)
      - "Emperor Joker, Part Three: All the World His Stage" (with Doug Mahnke, in #105, 2000)
    - "Under the Waterfront" (with Carlo Barberi, in #106, 2000)
    - "In the Zone" (with Doug Mahnke, in #107, 2000)
    - Superman: President Lex (tpb, 240 pages, 2003, ISBN 1-56389-974-4) includes:
      - "Metropolis is Burning" (with Paco Medina and Doug Mahnke, in #108, 2001)
      - "World without Superman" (with Duncan Rouleau, in #109, 2001)
      - "Saints" (with Doug Mahnke, in #110, 2001)
    - Superman: Return to Krypton (tpb, 208 pages, 2004, ISBN 1-4012-0194-6) includes:
      - "Return to Krypton, Part Three: The Most Dangerous Kryptonian Game" (with Doug Mahnke, in #111, 2001)
      - "Return to Krypton II, Part Three: Blood and Heresy" (with Karl Kerschl, in #128, 2002)
    - "The Adventures of... Krypto!" (with Yanick Paquette and Olivier Coipel, in #112, 2001)
    - "Poor Elijah" (with Doug Mahnke, in #114, 2001)
    - Superman: Our Worlds at War (tpb, 512 pages, 2006, ISBN 1-4012-1129-1) includes:
      - "Our Worlds at War" (with Doug Mahnke, in #115–117, 2001)
    - "Time and Punishment" (with Doug Mahnke, in #118, 2001)
    - "Joker's Last Laugh: Snowball's Chance" (with Yvel Guichet, in #119, 2001)
    - "What Lies Beneath" (with Yvel Guichet, in #120, 2002)
    - "Superman V Steel" (with Darryl Banks, in #122, 2002)
    - "Gangs of Metropolis" (with Yvel Guichet and Josh Hood (#124), in #123–125, 2002)
    - "Pantheon" (with Yvel Guichet and Kevin Sharpe (#126), in #126–127, 2002)
    - Superman: Ending Battle (tpb, 192 pages, 2009, ISBN 1-4012-2259-5) includes:
      - "Ending Battle" (with Brandon Badeaux, in #130–131, 2002)
    - "The Big Parade" (with John Lucas, in #132, 2003)
    - "Every Little Thing" (with Brandon Badeaux and Jon Bogdanove, in #134, 2003)
  - Superman: Secret Files & Origins #2: "A Hard Night's Work" (with Doug Mahnke, co-feature, 1999)
  - Metropolis Secret Files: "Municipal Bonds" (with Cully Hamner, co-feature in one-shot, 2000)
  - Adventures of Superman #600: "Superman: The Dailies 2002 — Super-Commander Kent — In the 7th Millennium!" (with Dave Gibbons, co-feature, 2002)
  - Superman vs. Darkseid: Apokolips Now! (with Mike McKone, one-shot, 2003) collected in Superman vs. Darkseid (tpb, 240 pages, 2015, ISBN 1-4012-5543-4)
- Strange Adventures vol. 2 #4: "Metal Fatigue" (with John Totleben, anthology, Vertigo, 2000)
- Batman:
  - Batman: Gotham Knights #17: "The Call" (with Claudio Castellini, co-feature, 2001) collected in Batman: Black and White Volume 3 (hc, 288 pages, 2007, ISBN 1-4012-1531-9; tpb, 2008, ISBN 1-4012-1354-5)
  - Batman: Shadow of Sin Tzu (with Rick Burchett, daily webcomic launched as a tie-in to Batman: Rise of Sin Tzu — 260 episodes were published via the AOL Kids website between September 29, 2003 and September 24, 2004)
- Tom Strong #26: "The Day Tom Strong Renegotiated the Friendly Skies" (with Pasqual Ferry, America's Best Comics, 2004) collected in Tom Strong Book Five (hc, 136 pages, 2005, ISBN 1-4012-0624-7; tpb, 2006, ISBN 1-4012-0625-5)
- The Flash: Stop Motion (prose novel published as part of the Pocket Star Books series Justice League of America, hc, 352 pages, 2004, ISBN 0-7394-4664-9; sc, 2004, ISBN 0-7434-1713-5)
- Superman and Batman vs. Aliens and Predator #1–2 (with Ariel Olivetti, 2007)
  - Collected as Superman and Batman vs. Aliens and Predator (tpb, 112 pages, 2007, ISBN 1-4012-1328-6)
  - Collected in DC Comics/Dark Horse Comics: Aliens (tpb, 400 pages, 2016, ISBN 1-4012-6636-3)
- The Spirit vol. 7 #1–3: "Angel Smerti" (with Moritat, First Wave, 2010) collected in Will Eisner's The Spirit: Angel Smerti (tpb, 168 pages, 2011, ISBN 1-4012-3026-1)
- Fables #150 (Volume 22): "The Last Blossom Story" (as artist — illustrations for the 5-page prose story written by Bill Willingham; sc, 160 pages, Vertigo, 2015, ISBN 1-4012-5233-8)
  - Collected in Fables: The Deluxe Edition Volume 15 (hc, 384 pages, 2017, ISBN 1-4012-7464-1)
  - Collected in Fables Compendium Four (tpb, 928 pages, DC Black Label, 2021, ISBN 1-77951-334-8)

=== Dark Horse Comics ===
- Dark Horse Presents #120: "One Last Job" (with Al Williamson, anthology, 1997) collected in Al Williamson Adventures (hc, 96 pages, Insight Studios Group, 2003, ISBN 1-889317-17-9)
- Predator: Hell and Hot Water #1–3 (with Gene Colan, 1997) collected in Predator Omnibus Volume 3 (tpb, 344 pages, 2008, ISBN 1-59307-925-7)
- Aliens:
  - Aliens Omnibus Volume 5 (tpb, 364 pages, 2008, ISBN 1-59307-991-5) includes:
    - Aliens: Havoc #1–2 (with Leif Jones + Duncan Fegredo + D'Israeli + John Totleben + Art Adams + Gary Gianni + George Pratt + Igor Kordey + Paul Lee + John K. Snyder III + Mark A. Nelson + Peter Bagge + Brian Horton + Dave Taylor + Kelley Jones + Guy Davis + Kellie Strom + Jay Stephens + Jerry Bingham + Kevin Nowlan (#1) and Frank Teran + Joel Naprstek + Travis Charest + P. Craig Russell + Aidan Potts + Sean Phillips + Rebecca Guay + Jon J Muth + Kilian Plunkett + Ron Randall + John Pound + Gene Ha + Vania Zouravliov + Sergio Aragonés + John Paul Leon + Derek Thompson + David Lloyd + Moebius + Dave Cooper + Mike Allred + Tony Millionaire (#2), 1997)
  - Aliens Omnibus Volume 6 (tpb, 376 pages, 2009, ISBN 1-59582-214-3) includes:
    - Aliens: Apocalypse — The Destroying Angels #1–4 (with Doug Wheatley, 1999) also collected as Aliens: Apocalypse — The Destroying Angels (tpb, 96 pages, 1999, ISBN 1-56971-399-5)
    - Dark Horse Presents #140: "Once in a Lifetime" (co-written by Schultz and Phil Amara, art by Rick Leonardi, anthology, 1999)
- SubHuman #1–4: "Rapture and the Deep" (co-written by Schultz and Michael Ryan, art by Roger Petersen, 1998–1999)
- Star Wars:
  - Star Wars: Episode I — Queen Amidala (with Galen Showman, one-shot, 1999)
    - An untitled 4-page prelude story, written by Schultz and drawn by Showman, was published in Star Wars: Episode I — The Phantom Menace #½ (Wizard, 1999)
    - Both the one-shot and the short story were collected by Dark Horse in Star Wars Omnibus: Emissaries and Assassins (tpb, 480 pages, 2009, ISBN 1-59582-229-1)
    - Both the one-shot and the short story were also collected by Marvel in Star Wars Legends: Rise of the Sith Volume 2 (tpb, 496 pages, 2017, ISBN 1-302-90790-5)
  - Star Wars: The Bounty Hunters — Scoundrel's Wages (with Mel Rubi, one-shot, 1999) collected in Star Wars Omnibus: Wild Space Volume 2 (tpb, 488 pages, 2013, ISBN 1-61655-147-X)
  - Star Wars Tales #6: "Fortune, Fate, and the Natural History of the Sarlacc" (with Kellie Strom, anthology, 2000) collected in Star Wars Tales Volume 2 (tpb, 232 pages, 2002, ISBN 1-56971-757-5)
- Aliens vs. Predator Annual: "Chained to Life and Death" (with Tom Biondolillo, co-feature, 1999) collected in Aliens vs. Predator Omnibus Volume 2 (tpb, 464 pages, 2007, ISBN 1-59307-829-3)
- Aliens vs. Predator vs. the Terminator #1–4 (with Mel Rubi, 2000) collected as Aliens vs. Predator vs. The Terminator (tpb, 96 pages, 2007, ISBN 1-56971-568-8)
- Al Williamson: Hidden Lands: "Up from South America" (biographical article for the book on Williamson's life and career, 224 pages, 2004, ISBN 1-56971-816-4)
- Bob Powell's Complete Cave Girl (foreword for the collection of the 1950s series Cave Girl and Thun'da; hc, 168 pages, 2014, ISBN 1-61655-700-1)
- Trekker: The Train to Avalon Bay (untitled one-page illustration created for the collected edition, tpb, 96 pages, 2014, ISBN 1-61655-343-X)
- Conan the Avenger #12: "The Adventures of Two-Gun Bob" (as guest artist — biographical strip created by Jim and Ruth Keegan, co-feature, 2015)
- Usagi Yojimbo Volume 33: The Hidden (foreword for the collected edition, hc, 200 pages, 2019, ISBN 1-5067-0851-X; tpb, 2019, ISBN 1-5067-0852-8)

=== Flesk Publications ===
- Mark Schultz: Various Drawings (collection of studies and finished works):
  - Volume 1 (hc, 48 pages, 2005, ISBN 0-9723758-7-2; sc, 2005, ISBN 0-9723758-6-4)
  - Volume 2 (hc, 48 pages, 2006, ISBN 1-933865-01-6; sc, 2006, ISBN 1-933865-00-8)
  - Volume 3 (hc, 48 pages, 2007, ISBN 1-933865-03-2; sc, 2007, ISBN 1-933865-02-4)
  - Volume 4 (hc, 48 pages, 2009, ISBN 1-933865-17-2; sc, 2009, ISBN 1-933865-16-4)
  - Volume 5 (hc, 48 pages, 2011, ISBN 1-933865-36-9; sc, 2011, ISBN 1-933865-35-0)
  - Portfolio: The Complete Various Drawings (compilation of all five volumes — hc, 272 pages, 2015, ISBN 1-933865-72-5)
- Mark Schultz: Blue Book (collection of preliminary drawings for Storms at Sea and excerpts from Schultz's sketchbook, 2010)
- Flesk Prime (collection of pencil and brush-and-ink drawings in the artist showcase book, 64 pages, 2011, ISBN 1-933865-38-5)
- Mark Schultz: Carbon (another series collecting studies and finished works):
  - Volume 1 (hc, 56 pages, 2013, ISBN 1-933865-55-5; sc, 2013, ISBN 1-933865-54-7)
  - Volume 2 (hc, 56 pages, 2016, ISBN 1-933865-93-8; sc, 2016, ISBN 1-933865-91-1)
  - Volume 3 (hc, 56 pages, 2018, ISBN 1-64041-008-2; sc, 2019, ISBN 1-64041-009-0)
  - Volume 4 (hc, 56 pages, 2021, ISBN 1-64041-036-8; sc, 2021, ISBN 1-64041-035-X)
  - Volume 5 (hc, 56 pages, 2023, ISBN 1-64041-070-8; sc, 2023, ISBN 1-64041-071-6)
- Storms at Sea (prose novella will full-page illustrations, written and drawn by Schultz, 80 pages, 2015, ISBN 1-933865-66-0)

=== Other publishers ===
- Marvel:
  - The Savage Sword of Conan #132: "The Sea King" (as inker — on Val Semeiks; written by Chuck Dixon, anthology, 1987)
    - Collected by Dark Horse in The Savage Sword of Kull Volume 2 (tpb, 448 pages, 2011, ISBN 1-59582-788-9)
    - Collected by Marvel in Kull the Savage: The Original Marvel Years Omnibus (hc, 952 pages, 2021, ISBN 1-302-92680-2)
  - Flash Gordon vol. 3 #1–2 (with Al Williamson, 1995) collected in Al Williamson's Flash Gordon: A Lifelong Vision of the Heroic (hc, 256 pages, Flesk, 2009, ISBN 1-933865-13-X; tpb, 2009, ISBN 1-933865-12-1)
  - Sub-Mariner Comics 70th Anniversary Special: "Vergeltungswaffe!" (with Al Williamson, co-feature, 2009) collected in Timely Comics: The 70th Anniversary Collection (hc, 280 pages, 2010, ISBN 978-0-7851-3899-0)
- A1 True Life Bikini Confidential: "Strange Fantasies" (one-page illustration — part of "The Betty Page Portfolio" segment, anthology one-shot, Atomeka, 1990)
- Madman:
  - Madman Adventures #2 (as inker — on two pages; written and drawn by Mike Allred, Tundra, 1993)
    - Collected by Image in Madman Volume 1 (tpb, 268 pages, 2007, ISBN 1-58240-810-6)
    - Collected by Dark Horse in Madman: Library Edition Volume 1 (hc, 680 pages, 2021, ISBN 1-5067-2244-X)
  - Madman Picture Exhibition #1 (untitled one-page illustration in the artist showcase series, AAA Pop, 2002)
- Robert E. Howard's Myth Maker (untitled one-page illustration in the anthology one-shot, Cross Plains, 1999)
- Frank Cho: Illustrator (foreword for the artbook — co-written by Schultz and Al Williamson; hc, 96 pages, Insight Studios Group, 2000, ISBN 1-889317-07-1; sc, 2001, ISBN 1-889317-09-8)
- Sky Ape (untitled one-page illustration created for the collected edition, tpb, 96 pages, AiT/Planet Lar, 2001, ISBN 0-9676847-8-1)
- Conan of Cimmeria: Volume One (1932–1933) (illustrations for the collection of prose Conan stories, first published in the UK by Wandering Star, hc, 480 pages, 2002, ISBN 0-9534253-7-1)
  - In anticipation of the release, Wandering Star published a chapbook featuring Schultz's preliminary drawings and studies: Robert E. Howard's Conan of Cimmeria: A Sketchbook by Mark Schultz (2001)
  - The volume was subsequently published in the US by Del Rey Books as The Coming of Conan the Cimmerian (sc, 464 pages, 2003, ISBN 0-345-46151-7; hc, 502 pages, 2005, ISBN 0-7394-4081-0)
- More Fund Comics: An All-Star Benefit Comic for the CBLDF (one-page illustration featuring Xenozoic Tales characters, anthology graphic novel, 144 pages, Sky Dog, 2003, ISBN 0-9721831-2-4)
- Prince Valiant #3537–ongoing (with Gary Gianni (November 21, 2004–March 25, 2012) and Thomas Yeates (April 1, 2012–present), Sunday strip distributed by King Features, 2004–...)
  - All strips published between November 21, 2004 and May 18, 2008 were collected as Prince Valiant: Far from Camelot (tpb, 192 pages, Andrews McMeel Publishing, 2008, ISBN 0-7407-7737-8)
- Charles R. Knight: Autobiography of an Artist (illustrations for the book of Knight's autobiographical pieces, hc, 128 pages, GT Labs, 2005, ISBN 0-9660106-7-1; sc, 2005, ISBN 0-9660106-8-X)
- Bart Simpson's Treehouse of Horror #11: "Two Tickets to Heck: Blast from the Future Past!" (as artist, co-written by Chris Bonham and Steve Ringgenberg, anthology, Bongo, 2005)
  - Collected in The Simpsons: Treehouse of Horror — Dead Man's Jest (tpb, 128 pages, HarperCollins, 2008, ISBN 0-06-157135-0)
  - Collected in The Simpsons: Treehouse of Horror Ominous Omnibus Volume 1 (hc, 416 pages, Abrams ComicArts, 2022, ISBN 1-4197-3712-0)
- Athena Voltaire: The Collected Webcomics (foreword for the collection of comics serialized online between 2002 and 2004; tpb, 96 pages, Ape Entertainment, 2006, ISBN 0-9741398-9-0)
- The Stuff of Life (with Kevin and Zander Cannon, graphic novel, hc, 160 pages, Hill and Wang, 2009, ISBN 0-8090-8946-7; sc, 2009, ISBN 0-8090-8947-5)
- IDW Publishing:
  - Hero Comics 2009: "The Dawn Patrol" (one-page illustration featuring Xenozoic Tales characters, anthology one-shot, 2009)
  - The Adventures of Simone and Ajax (foreword for the collection of comics serialized online between 2007 and 2008 via ComicMix; tpb, 132 pages, 2010, ISBN 1-60010-616-1)
  - X-9: Secret Agent Corrigan Volume 1 (foreword for the collection of strips published between January 30, 1967 and August 30, 1969; hc, 288 pages, 2010, ISBN 1-60010-697-8)
  - 50 Girls 50 and Other Stories (foreword for the collection of stories published in EC Comics anthology titles in the early 1950s; hc, 240 pages, 2013, ISBN 1-60699-577-4)
- Kirby100: "Fantastic Four #52" (short piece for the book of critique and commentary on the works of Jack Kirby, 244 pages, TwoMorrows Publishing, 2017, ISBN 1-60549-078-4)

=== Cover illustrations ===
- Speakeasy #72 (Acme Press, 1987)
- Kings in Disguise #3 (Kitchen Sink, 1988)
- Amazing Heroes #169 (Fantagraphics Books, 1989)
- Challenge #47 (Game Designers' Workshop, 1990)
- King Kong #2, 5 (Fantagraphics Books, 1991)
- The Comics Journal #150 (Fantagraphics Books, 1992)
- Madman Adventures tpb (jam cover) (Tundra, 1993)
- Classic Star Wars #8, 17 (Dark Horse, 1993–1994)
- There's a Madman in My Mirror #1 (Bench Press, 1994)
- Penthouse Men's Adventure Comix #2 (Penthouse, 1995)
- The Real Adventures of Jonny Quest #11 (Dark Horse, 1997)
- Tarzan vol. 4 #15–16 (Dark Horse, 1997)
- The Spirit: The New Adventures #2 (as inker — on Will Eisner, Kitchen Sink, 1998)
- The Tarzan Comics Library (Dark Horse):
  - Edgar Rice Burroughs' Tarzan of the Apes tpb (1999)
  - Edgar Rice Burroughs' Tarzan: The Jewels of Opar tpb (1999)
  - Edgar Rice Burroughs' Tarzan the Untamed tpb (1999)
- Captain Gravity tpb (Penny-Farthing Press, 1999)
- Fantastic Five #2 (Marvel, 1999)
- Star Wars vol. 2 #13–18 (Dark Horse, 1999–2000)
- Robert E. Howard's Worms of the Earth tpb (Cross Plains, 2000)
- Rocket's Blast Comicollector vol. 2 #4 (James Van Hise, 2002)
- The Jack Kirby Collector #41 (as inker — on Jack Kirby, TwoMorrows Publishing, 2004)
- Bone Sharps, Cowboys, and Thunder Lizards gn (GT Labs, 2005)
- Action Comics #836 (DC Comics, 2006)
- Alien Pig Farm 3000 #2, 4 (Image, 2007)
- Bad Planet #3 (Image, 2007)
- The War That Time Forgot #3 (DC Comics, 2008)
- Comics Revue Presents #281/282 (Manuscript Press, 2009)
- Our Fighting Forces #1 (DC Comics, 2010)
- Adventures in Science Fantasy sc (REH Foundation Press, 2012)
- Grimm Fairy Tales Presents the Jungle Book #1 (Zenescope, 2012)
- The Colossal Conan hc (Dark Horse, 2013)
- Conan the Slayer #1 (Dark Horse, 2016)
- Pellucidar: At the Earth's Core tpb (Dark Horse, 2017)
- Bermuda #4 (IDW Publishing, 2021)
- Arrowsmith: Behind Enemy Lines #3 (Image, 2022)
