= Jim Mitchell (cartoonist) =

American cartoonist

- Born: James Mitchell; April 28, 1949 (age 77) Milwaukee, Wisconsin
- Areas: Cartoonist, Writer, Artist
- Notable works: Smile

Jim Mitchell (born April 28, 1949) is an American underground cartoonist from Milwaukee. Mitchell was part of the late-1960s/early-1970s Milwaukee underground comix scene and a co-founder of the Krupp Comics/Kitchen Sink group (with Denis Kitchen and Don Glassford).

In the early 1970s, Mitchell (then a Marquette University student) regularly created strips such as "Smile" for the underground newspaper The Bugle, which were subsequently syndicated to other underground and college newspapers via the Krupp Syndicate. His strips (and covers) appeared in The Bugle; in three issues of his own comic, Smile (1971-1972); and in other comix, including Teen-Age Horizons of Shangrila, Mom's Homemade Comics, Bizarre Sex, Pro Junior, and Hungry Chuck Biscuit's Comics & Stories.

Mitchell was imprisoned in Mexico for four and a half years for possession of marijuana which prevented his involvement in the further evolution of the underground scene, but was released in late 1977.

He runs his own full-service art studio, Distant Thunder Studios, in Milwaukee.

== Sources ==
- Alessandrini, Marjorie, ed. (1986). Encyclopédie des bandes dessinées. Paris: A Michel.
- DeFrancis, Julianna, ed. (2023). The Artists of Milwaukee. Milwaukee, WI: E Schmitt.
- Estren, Mark James (1974). A History of Underground Comics (1st ed.). San Francisco: Straight Arrow Books. ISBN 978-0879320751.
