= Bugle (newspaper) =

United States underground newspaper (1970–1978)

- Type: Weekly newspaper
- Format: Tabloid/Alternative newspaper
- Founder(s): Denis Kitchen, Dave Schreiner, Mike Hughes, Mike Jacobi, Judy Jacobi
- Founded: September 1, 1970; 56 years ago in Milwaukee, Wisconsin
- Ceased publication: 1978; 48 years ago
- Headquarters: 2779 N Bremen St, Milwaukee, WI 53212, East Side, Milwaukee

The Bugle or Bugle-American (the original name) was an underground newspaper based in Milwaukee, Wisconsin. Distributed throughout the state from September 1970 to 1978, it was published weekly for most of that time for a total of 316 issues. The Bugle, an early example of the alternative newsweekly genre, was less radical than the city's other underground newspaper, Kaleidoscope, although it was not viewed that way by the local media such as the Milwaukee Journal and Milwaukee Sentinel.

The paper was founded by Denis Kitchen, Dave Schreiner, Mike Hughes, Mike Jacobi and Judy Jacobi, some of them former journalism students at the University of Wisconsin–Milwaukee. The tongue-in-cheek name was inspired by that of the Daily Bugle, the fictional newspaper published by Spider-Man-hater J. Jonah Jameson. Because of Kitchen's interest in underground comics, the Bugle featured a comics page with the works of both local artists like Kitchen, Jim Mitchell, Don Glassford, Bruce Walthers, and Wendel Pugh, and work by nationally known artists like Robert Crumb. For a time Kitchen syndicated these strips to about fifty college and alternative papers around the country.

On February 22, 1975, the Bugle's office on Bremen Street in the Riverwest neighborhood was firebombed. About the same time, the car of Kaleidoscope's editor John Kois was also bombed. The newspaper's next issue, delayed a week, was aided by financial support from such fans as George Reedy, Leonard Cohen and Bryan Ferry. Neither bombing was ever solved; many suspected involvement by the Milwaukee Police Department's Red Squad.

Veterans of the Bugle (in addition to Kitchen) include Tony Capaccio (later editor of Jane's Defence Weekly), Greg Kot (the Chicago Tribune's pop music critic since 1990), Rob Fixmer (later technology news editor of The New York Times), Gary Peterson, and Peter James Spielmann of the Associated Press.

A history of the Bugle was published in 2026 by the Wisconsin Historical Society Press: "Some Things Don't Burn: Art, Activism and Arson at the Bugle American," written by Aurore Sibley, the daughter of Bugle music editor Gary Peterson and Joyce Rodgers, a Bugle contributing writer and typesetter.

== See also ==
- List of underground newspapers of the 1960s counterculture
