= Don Simpson (cartoonist) =

American cartoonist (born 1961)

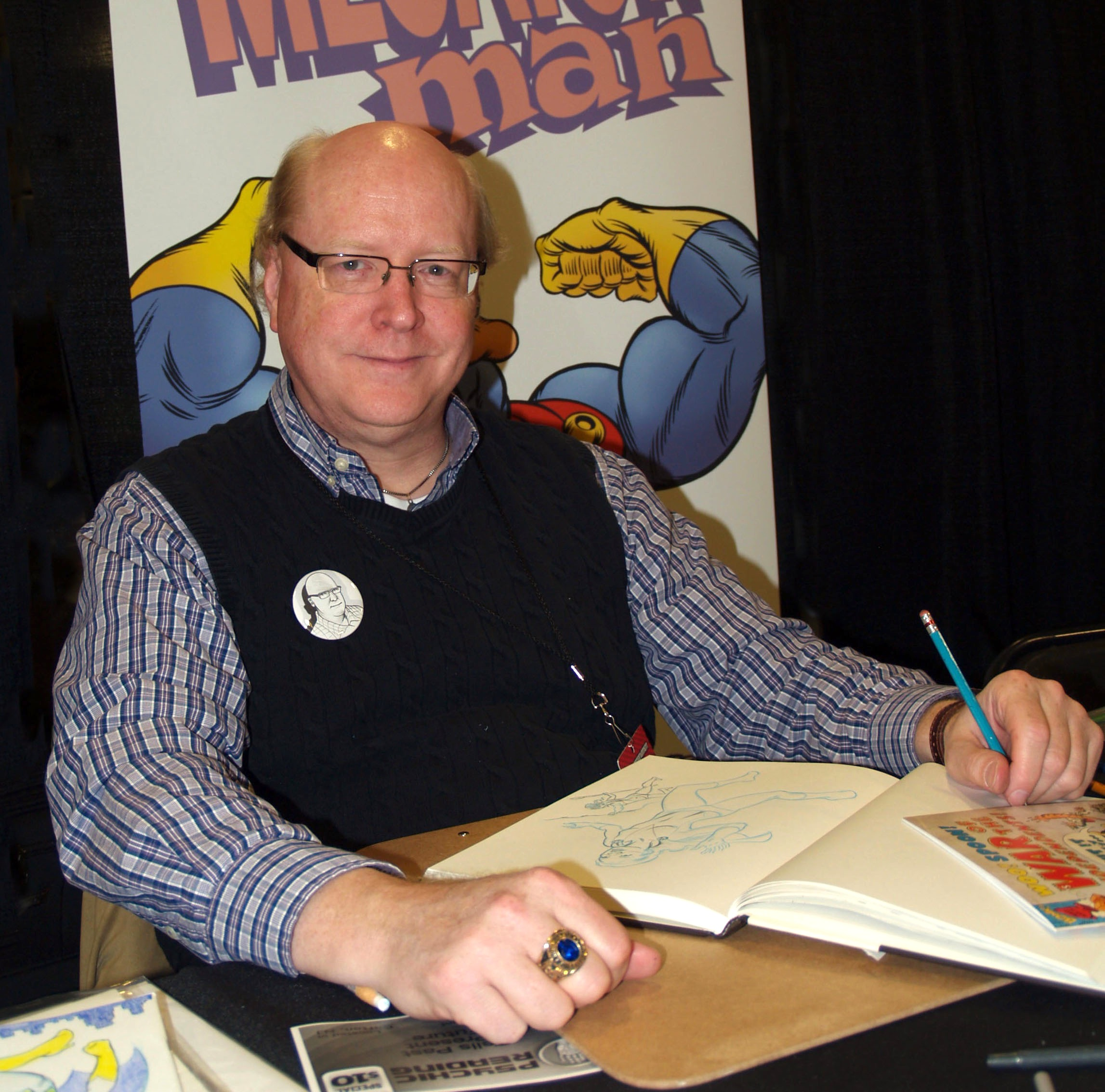
- Simpson in April 2016
- Born: 1961 (age 64–65) Livonia, Michigan, U.S.
- Areas: Writer, penciller, inker
- Pseudonym: Anton Drek
- Notable works: Megaton Man, King Kong

Donald Edward Simpson (born 1961) is an American comic book cartoonist and freelance illustrator, most noted as the creator of the series Megaton Man, Border Worlds, and Bizarre Heroes, as well as the official comic book adaption of King Kong. He also freelanced for nearly every major comic book publisher. His most widely seen work are the illustrations he created for Al Franken's 2003 bestseller, Lies and the Lying Liars Who Tell Them: A Fair and Balanced Look at the Right.

== Early life ==
Drawing since the age of five, Simpson was encouraged by artists James Malone and Keith Pollard, among others. Simpson debuted as a comic book artist in 1984 with his creation Megaton Man, a Kitchen Sink Press title that sometimes satirized superheroes cliches. In April 2013, Simpson received his PhD in History of Art and Architecture from the University of Pittsburgh.

== Career ==
=== Megaton Man ===
Simpson wrote and drew the 10-issue Kitchen Sink Press comic-book series Megaton Man (Nov. 1984 – June 1986) and its three-issue miniseries sequel, The Return of Megaton Man (1988). Thereafter, subsequent installments of the previously color Megaton Man series appeared as black-and-white Kitchen Sink one-shots, including Megaton Man Meets the Uncategorizable X+Thems" #1 (April 1989), Yarn Man #1 (Oct. 1989), and Pteranoman #1 (Aug. 1990).

In summer 1985, Marvel Comics objected to Simpson's parody superhero team, the Megatropolis Quartet, claiming that Rex Rigid (Mr. Waterballoon/Liquid Man), Stella Starlight (the See-Thru Girl), and Bing Gloom (Yarn Man) too closely resembled its group the Fantastic Four, and issued a "cease and desist" letter. The publisher responded that the characters fell under the Fair Use doctrine, and Marvel pursued no further legal action.

Megaton Man and the character's supporting cast appeared throughout Simpson's later self-published series Bizarre Heroes (Fiasco Comics, 1994–1996), the final two issues of which (#16 and #17) are alternately titled Megaton Man vs. Forbidden Frankenstein #1 and Megaton Man #0. Simpson then concentrated on his Megaton Man cast in Image Comics' Megaton Man: Hardcopy #1–2 and Megaton Man: Bombshell #1 (1999). Other appearances of the title character include Savage Dragon vs. The Savage Megaton Man #1 with creator Erik Larsen (Image Comics, 1993), and The normalman/Megaton Man Special with Jim Valentino (Image, 1995).

In 1994, Simpson began his own imprint, Fiasco Comics, to publish Don Simpson's Bizarre Heroes, which mixed members of the cast of Megaton Man with characters Simpson had created as far back as junior high school, such as the Meddler; the Slick; John Bradford, Clown-Master of Disguise; and B-50, the Hybrid Man. The series ran under differing titles: as Don Simpson's Bizarre Heroes for numbered #0–8 (May–Dec. 1994), followed by Bizarre Heroes #9–15 (Feb. 1995 – Jan. 1996) The final two issues, #16 and #17, appeared under the titles Megaton Man vs. Forbidden Frankenstein, for which the Grand Comics Database notes, "Though officially listed in the indicia under this title, this issue is also considered to be Bizarre Heroes #16," and Megaton Man #0 (July 1996), for which the Grand Comics Database notes, "Listed in the indicia as Megaton Man #0 (Bizarre Heroes #17).'"

Simpson's Megaton Man Weekly Serial 1996–2000 webcomics series became a backup feature in The Savage Dragon in the late 1990s. Megaton Man also makes a cameo appearance in Red Anvil Comics' War of the Independents #1 (2013) and #4 (2014).

=== Other work ===
Simpson wrote and drew the science-fiction backup feature Border Worlds, about a woman and a colonial rebellion, set on a space station, beginning in Megaton Man #6. The feature spun off into a seven-issue, "mature readers" black-and-white comics (July 1986 – Aug. 1987), followed by Border Worlds: Marooned #1 (April 1990), the only issue of an intended four-issue miniseries.

In 1986 Simpson collaborated with Alan Moore on the comics short "In Pictopia" in Anything Goes!, an anthology published by Fantagraphics Books to raise money in the lawsuit brought by Michael Fleisher.

Simpson went on to do freelance art for such comics as Teenage Mutant Ninja Turtles – "Teen Techno Turtle Trio Plus One!" (Shell Shock) and "Tales of Alternate Turtles on the Moon" (Turtle Soup Vol.2 #2), Mirage Studios; and Teenage Mutant Ninja Turtles Meet Archie, Archie Comics (1990) – and DC Comics' 1987–1988 anthology series Wasteland and Flash Annual #3 (1990). In his aforementioned works for Mirage, he introduced the superhero character Pteranoman, intended to launch a new comic title, of which only one issue actually went into print.

Fiasco Comics, Inc. continued as the business name for Simpson's commercial-illustration business, which suspended operations in the late 1990s. Clients included Progressive Insurance, Kennywood Park, the Pittsburgh Post-Gazette, and the Pittsburgh Pirates, for the latter of which Simpson created the Parrot's Kid's Club logo.

=== Anton Drek ===
Between 1990 and 1992, Simpson created six erotic underground comix under the pseudonym "Anton Drek," including Wendy Whitebread, Undercover Slut and Forbidden Frankenstein. Portions of Wendy and other strips appeared in the first four issues of the Spanish erotic-comics anthology magazine Kiss Comix in 1991, and an Italian edition of Wendy Whitebread #1 appeared in 2005 from Blue Press. Finnish translations of Wendy Whitebread, Undercover Slut and Forbidden Frankenstein appeared as Paula Patonki, Piilokyttänarttu and Frankensteinin Perhekalleudet respectively, issued by the Helsinki publisher Sötem in 1995.

== Partial bibliography ==
- 1990: Cartoonist (writer-artist), Megaton Man: Volume I (Princeton WI: Kitchen Sink Press).
- 1994: Cartoonist (writer-artist) [under the pseudonym Anton Drek], Anton's Collected Drek featuring Wendy Whitebread, second expanded edition (Seattle WA: ErosComix/Fantagraphics Books).
- 1995: Cartoonist (writer-artist), Bizarre Heroes: The Apocalypse Affiliation (Pittsburgh PA: Fiasco Comics Inc.).
- 2000: Cartoonist (writer-artist), "Teaching Cartooning: The Delusive Art," in Streetwise: Autobiographical Stories by Professionals, foreword by Will Eisner, (Raleigh NC: TwoMorrows Publishing).
- 2003: Illustrator and letterer, "In Pictopia," written by Alan Moore, with art contributions by Peter Poplaski and Mike Kazaleh [1986], in George Khoury, The Extraordinary Works of Alan Moore (Raleigh NC: TwoMorrows Publishing).
- 2003: Illustrator and letterer, "Operation Chickenhawk: Episode One" and "The Gospel of Supply Side Jesus," written by Al Franken, from Al Franken, Lies and the Lying Liars Who Tell Them: A Fair and Balanced Look at the Right (New York NY: Dutton).
- 2004: Cartoonist (writer-artist), Don Simpson's Megaton Man, introduction by Al Franken (New York NY: ibooks/Simon & Schuster).
- 2005: Cartoonist [under the pseudonym Anton Drek], Drekbook: l'intégrale d'Anton Drek, trans. Bernard Joubert (Paris, France: Dynamite).
- 2005: Illustrator, letterer, and colorist, "Batman Upgrade 5.0," written by Dean Haglund and Peter Murrieta, in Bizarro World (New York NY: DC Comics Inc.).
