= Denis Kitchen =

American underground cartoonist and publisher

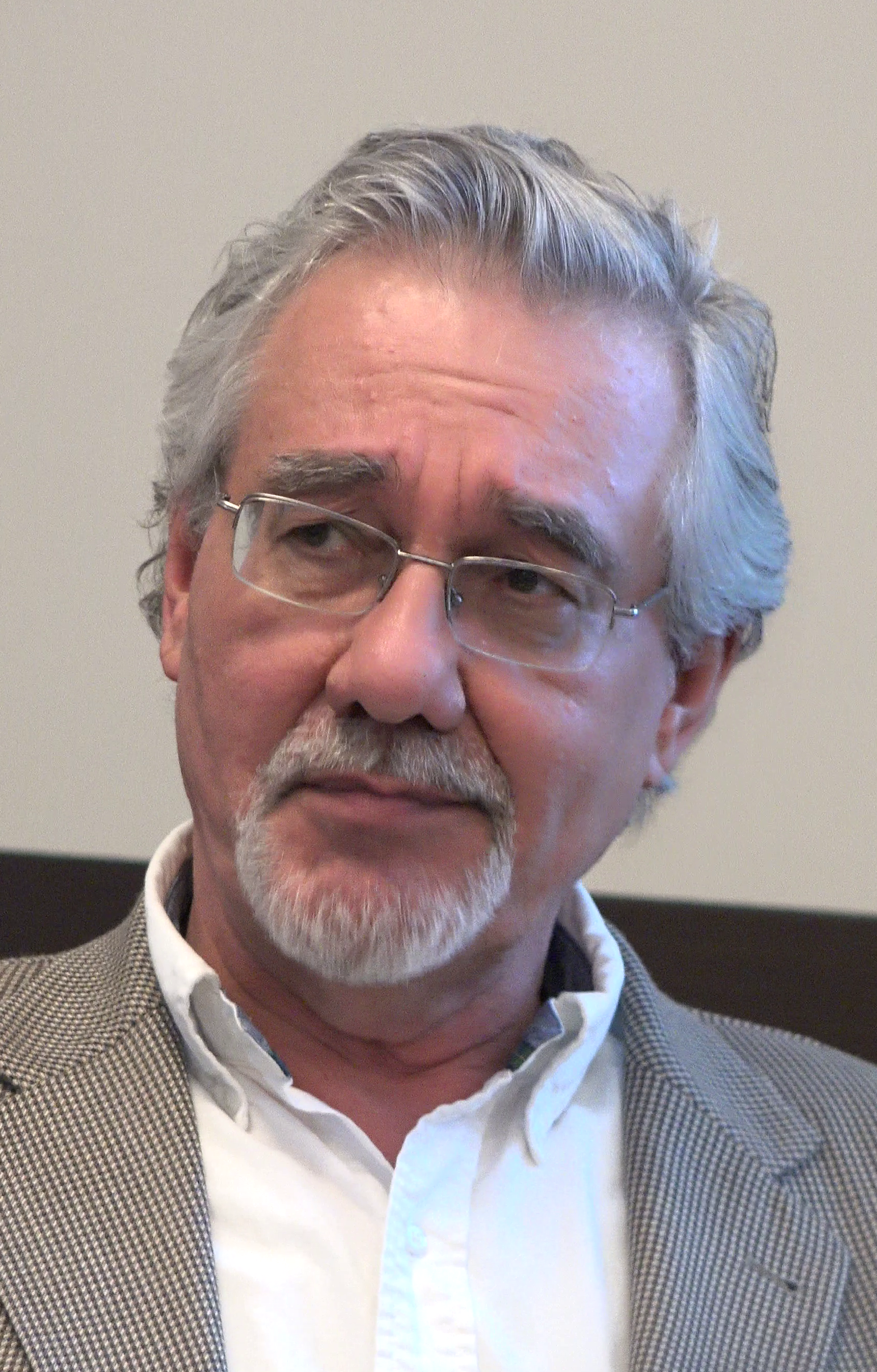
- Denis Kitchen at Columbia University in 2015
- Born: August 27, 1946 (age 80)
- Areas: Cartoonist, Publisher
- Notable works: Kitchen Sink Press; Comic Book Legal Defense Fund

Denis Kitchen (born August 27, 1946) is an American underground cartoonist, publisher, author, agent, and the founder of the Comic Book Legal Defense Fund.

== Early life ==
Kitchen grew up in Wisconsin, attending William Horlick High School, Racine, where he cofounded and edited Klepto, an unofficial school paper, also contributing stories and illustrations to the paper. He continued this interest at the University of Wisconsin–Milwaukee, where in 1967 he cofounded and served as art director for the humor magazine Snide, also supplying cartoons. He also provided cartoons for the UWM Post.

Originally a member of the ROTC on campus, Kitchen left ROTC, a decision he later attributed to an allergy to the wool uniform pants ("...had the pants been made out of cotton, I might be a lieutenant colonel today," he later said). He took classes in journalism and started frequenting a local coffeehouse called the Avant Garde. He became opposed to the Vietnam War and joined the Socialist Labor Party of America.

== Krupp Comics and Kitchen Sink Press ==
In 1969 Kitchen decided to self-publish his comics and cartoons in the magazine Mom’s Homemade Comics, inspired in part by Bijou Funnies and Zap Comix. The selling out of the print run of 4000 inspired him further, and in 1970 he founded Kitchen Sink Press (initially as an artists' cooperative) and launched the underground newspaper The Bugle-American, with Jim Mitchell and others. Under the name of the Krupp Syndicate, (Note: "Steve Krupp" was a comics character created by Kitchen as a stand-in for then-Marvel Comics publisher Stan Lee. Kitchen created the Krupp character in 1975 as part of the cover illustration of Comix Book #3.) he syndicated comic strips to almost 50 other underground and college newspapers. In addition to the Milwaukee artists like himself, Mitchell, Bruce Walthers, Don Glassford and Wendel Pugh, Kitchen began to publish works by such cartoonists as Howard Cruse, Robert Crumb, Art Spiegelman, Justin Green, Trina Robbins, and S. Clay Wilson, and he soon expanded his operations, launching Krupp Comic Works, a parent organization into which he placed ownership of Kitchen Sink Press and through which he also launched such diverse ventures as a record company and a commercial art studio. In 1980 he invited Cruse to edit Gay Comix, one of the first comics to feature the work of openly gay and lesbian cartoonists.

In the 1980s through the early 1990s, Kitchen Sink Press would publish industry legends such as Will Eisner, Harvey Kurtzman, Al Capp, and award-winning alternative creators such as Mark Schultz, Monte Beauchamp, and Charles Burns.

In 1993, Kitchen Sink Press merged with Kevin Eastman's Tundra Publishing and relocated to Northampton, Massachusetts. It would go on to publish works by Alan Moore, Neil Gaiman, James O'Barr, Don Simpson, and Scott McCloud, winning numerous Eisner and Harvey Awards.

== Funding defenses ==
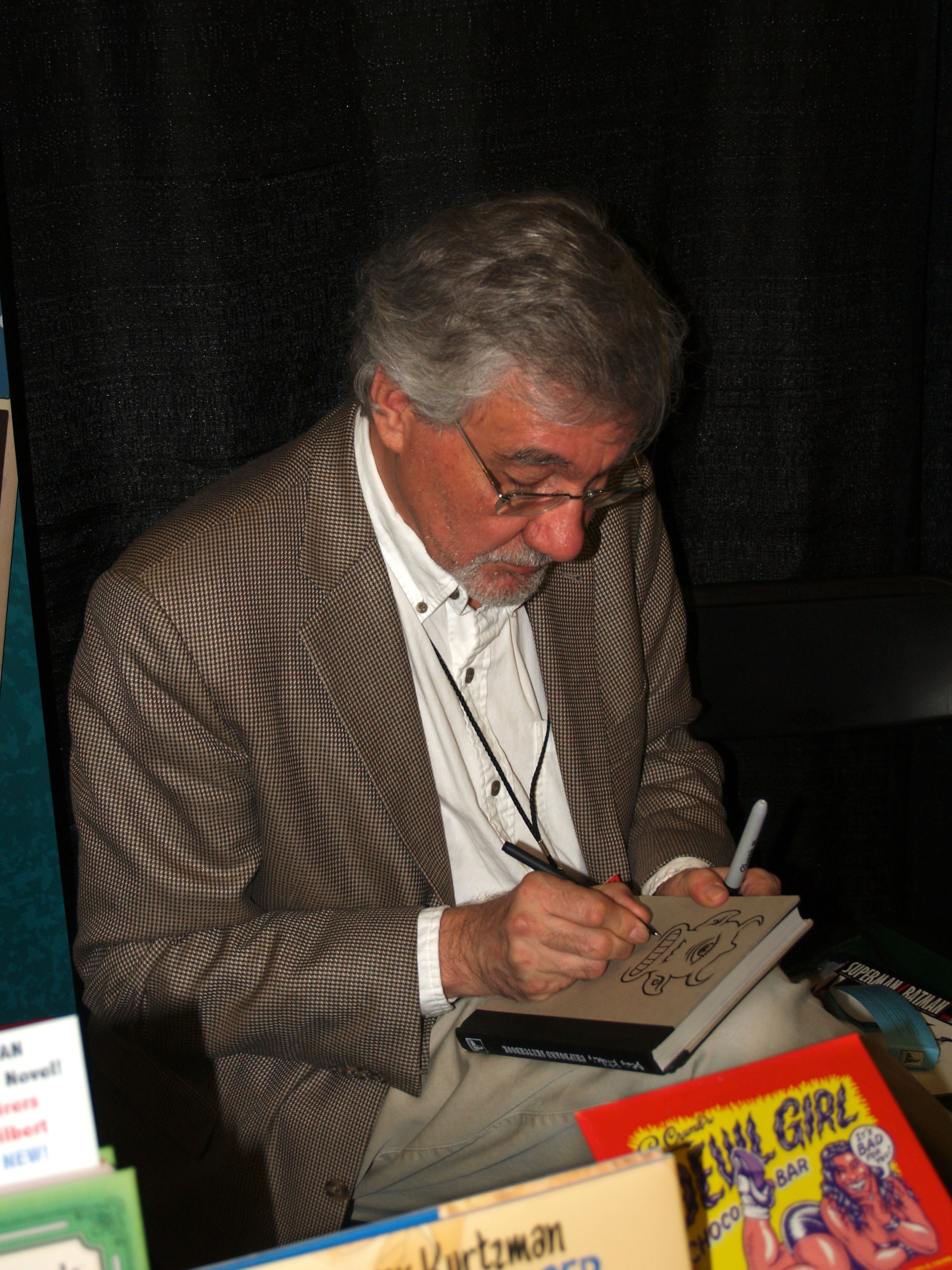
Kitchen sketching in April 2016

In 1986 comic store manager Michael Correa was charged with possession and sale of obscene material. Since two of the works cited in the case as obscene were published by Kitchen Sink Press, Kitchen felt some responsibility for Correa's predicament. He raised money for the defense of Correa who saw his conviction overturned on appeal. Kitchen used surplus funds to incorporate the Comic Book Legal Defense Fund as a non-profit charitable organization in 1990. Kitchen served as the fund's president from its inception until 2004, noting on his retirement from the board that "The challenges facing comics are different from when I founded the Fund … I think it's fitting that the generation directly facing these challenges … should be the ones standing up to them."

== Art agency and art book ==
Kitchen Sink Press went out of business in 1999. Kitchen later established himself as an art agent, handling the art sales of both Will Eisner and Harvey Kurtzman amongst others through his company Denis Kitchen Art Agency. He is a partner with Judith Hansen in Kitchen & Hansen Agency, LLC, which serves as a literary agency for Will Eisner's estate.

Kitchen was a partner in Kitchen, Lind & Associates which served as agency and book packager for clients including The Estates of Harvey Kurtzman and Al Capp, Rebecca Guay, Howard Cruse, Eleanor Davis, Todd M. Hignite, Mark Fearing, and William Stout.

In 2010, Dark Horse Comics released The Oddly Compelling Art of Denis Kitchen which served as part art book and part autobiography. In 2011, it was nominated for an Eisner Award (for Best-Comics Related Book) and a Harvey Award (for Best Biographical, Historical Or Journalistic Presentation). It went on to win a 2011 American Graphic Design Award in the editorial category.

== Kitchen Sink Books ==
In 2013, Dark Horse Comics announced it had established a joint venture imprint entitled Kitchen Sink Books, directed by Kitchen and business partner John Lind to focus on art books, historical collections and reprints." The first large format hardcover was The Best of Comix Book, a collection of work edited by Kitchen and Stan Lee in the mid-1970s. The imprint's most recent title, a collection of the work of Will Eisner, was published in 2018.
