= SoHo Weekly News =

New York City alternative newspaper (1973–1982)

- Front page of the November 5–11, 1980, issue
- Type: Alternative weekly
- Founder: Michael Goldstein
- Founded: October 11, 1973
- Ceased publication: March 10, 1982
- Language: English
- City: New York City
- Country: United States

The SoHo Weekly News (SWN) was a weekly alternative newspaper founded by American music publicist Michael Goldstein and published in New York City from 1973 to 1982. Goldstein positioned the paper as a competitor to The Village Voice, an established alternative newspaper, but it struggled financially. SWN was acquired by Associated Newspaper Group in 1979 and ceased publication three years later after the company was unable to make it profitable.

The paper was known for its coverage of Manhattan's SoHo neighborhood as the area was becoming gentrified. Although the official editorial stance was anti-gentrification, one retrospective argued that its coverage of local culture and business contributed to the upward trend in property values. Its coverage of emerging music acts in local venues was particularly strong, including one of the first newspaper interviews with the punk rock band the Ramones.

Many of the staff went on to have distinguished careers after the paper shut down. Annie Flanders founded Details magazine while Kim Hastreiter and David Hershkovits started Paper. Bill Cunningham spent decades as a photojournalist for The New York Times, Allan Tannenbaum became known for his coverage of rock musicians, and Bruce Weber got his start photographing male fashion models with an influential SWN photo story showing an underwear-clad male model in erotic poses.

== Background ==
The SoHo Weekly News (SWN) was an alternative newspaper founded in 1973 by American music publicist Michael Goldstein and published in New York City until 1982. The paper competed with The Village Voice, which over the previous two decades had established itself as the city's largest newsweekly.

Although the term alternative newspaper is not well-defined, it generally refers to papers that cater to a distinct community or social group, often promoting a particular political point of view. The 1960s and early 1970s saw the emergence of many of these, usually short-lived, in New York and elsewhere. Following the establishment of the Voice in 1955, Walter Bowart's counter-culture East Village Other (EVO) started in 1965, running until 1972. On the heels of EVO, with many of the same staff, was the New York Ace, debuting in 1971 and lasting only about a year. Rat Subterranean News was published from 1968 to 1970. Elsewhere in the US, similar publications of the era included the Los Angeles Free Press (1964–1971), the San Francisco Oracle (1966–1968), Milwaukee's Kaleidoscope (1967–1971), the Chicago Seed (1967–1974), and Seattle's Helix (1967–1970).

== Startup and operation ==
SWN office location at 111 Spring Street within SoHo

Goldstein put out the first issue of the SoHo Weekly News on October 11, 1973, using the last $800 (equivalent to $5,800 in 2025) of his savings. The paper's offices were at 111 Spring Street, in the SoHo neighborhood of Manhattan, although the earliest issues were produced out of Goldstein's apartment on nearby Broome Street. Initially 8 pages, SWN eventually expanded to more than 100.

In his 2003 book SoHo: The Rise and Fall of an Artists' Colony, Richard Kostelanetz asserted that SWN "was founded ... in part to exploit the success of the Voice, with a similar size and similarly weekly publication schedule". SWN art editor Gerald Marzorati, however, had a vision for the paper which set it apart from its other predecessors, saying he wanted to "avoid the pitfalls of underground journalism – like self-indulgent, first-person writing".

In January 1976, Goldstein told The New York Times that SWN was the second-largest English-language weekly in the city and was sold at 400 newsstands with a circulation of about 28,000. He described the paper's audience as 22-to-35 years old: people who had come of age attending rock concerts in the 1960s. He conceded, however, that his market research consisted of seeing who was buying the paper at newsstands. Five years later, after the paper had undergone a change of ownership and was struggling to survive, one unidentified SWN writer complained that the paper had never been able to pin down exactly who its audience was and another noted that historically it had appealed to "art workers, musicians, women and gays".

Hank Weintraub of advertising agency DienerHauser-Greenthal stated that the paper's circulation and effectiveness were unproven, that it had not shown itself to be as much competition for The Village Voice as its management claimed, and that he would only place advertisements there when specifically requested by clients. Stephen M. Blacker, associate publisher of The Village Voice, saw a need for more newspapers but did not regard SWN as a serious competitor.

In a 2020 interview, fashion editor Kim Hastreiter spoke with Paper magazine editor Mickey Boardman and described the impact SWN had:

... there was this newspaper, called the SoHo News, that was downtown. It was like our bible. Every Wednesday morning, it would come out and that's what you did. You bought it and looked through everything. It had a calendar that told you every club, every party, every art opening, every opening of anything, every concert. You planned your whole week from it.

== Staff ==
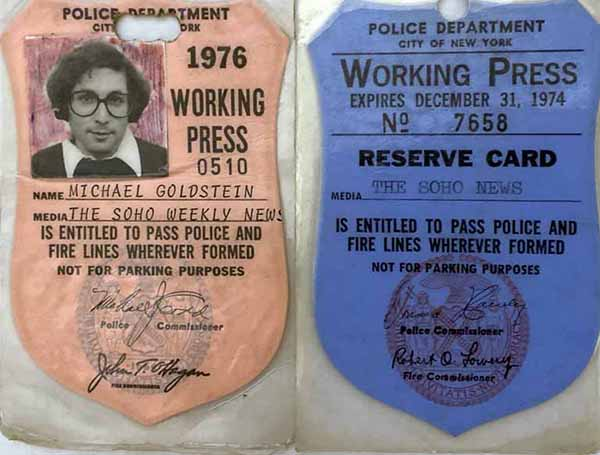
New York City press credentials issued to founder Michael Goldstein

Many SWN staff had notable careers before or after their association with the paper. The editorial team was led by founder Goldstein, who previously had been a successful music publicist. Among his clients were Jimi Hendrix, Frank Zappa, and the Grateful Dead; 17 of the acts he represented were eventually inducted into the Rock & Roll Hall of Fame.

Goldstein recruited Jaakov Kohn, former editor of East Village Other, to serve as editor of SWN. Dan Rattiner, who had also worked at EVO, joined the paper as a columnist. The editorial staff also included Doug Ireland.

In 1976, Al Ellenberg was brought on as editor-in-chief. Ellenberg had previously been assistant managing editor at the New York Post, leaving there after Rupert Murdoch bought the paper. In addition to his editorial duties at SWN, Ellenberg also wrote Big Al, a column about horse racing.

Gerald Marzorati, SWN art editor and author of its Artful Dodger column, was reportedly the first journalist to write a major story about graphic artist Keith Haring. Dramaturgy scholar Elinor Fuchs contributed as a freelancer. John Perreault was senior art critic from 1975 to 1982, earning a 1979 fellowship in art criticism from the National Endowment for the Arts. Edward Gorey wrote movie reviews under the byline Wardore Edgy; in a 1991 interview, he said that if The Village Voice was Off-Broadway, then SWN was Off-off-Broadway. Joan La Barbara reviewed lesser-known jazz and experimental musicians from 1974 to 1975. Sally Banes edited dance and performance art from 1976 to 1980. Banes also had a major role in a failed attempt to unionize SWN.

In 1976, freelancers made up 80 percent of the staff. In 2003, Richard Kostelanetz contrasted the residency of the staff at The Village Voice with SWN, noting that the Voice had been founded by people who lived in Greenwich Village with the goal of providing fellow residents community news. Kostelanetz considered Goldstein to be an outsider and said that despite having its offices in SoHo, most of SWN's editors (and, he believed, most of its writers) did not live in the neighborhood. In 2015, Kostelanetz wrote that he did not consider SWN to be a "true SoHo publication", contrasting it with other contemporary small SoHo-based papers such as Art-Rite and Art Workers News, the latter being where Marzorati started his career as an art writer.

=== Follow-ons ===
By the end of 1979, Goldstein had sold his stake in SWN, been replaced as editor-in-chief, and announced plans to start a new paper. The Wall Street Final began publishing in June 1980 but ceased publication after only two months.

Annie Flanders joined SWN in 1976, where she worked as a style columnist and later as fashion editor. Very shortly after SWN closed, she organized a meeting of ex-staffers including Ronnie Cooke, Stephen Saban, Lesley Vinson, Megan Haungs, and Bill Cunningham to found Details magazine, which ran from 1982 to 2015. Kim Hastreiter succeeded Flanders as fashion editor; she and news reporter David Hershkovits went on to found Paper magazine. Marzorati went on to work at The New Yorker, Harper's Magazine, and eventually The New York Times, where he edited The New York Times Magazine. Staffers Margo Jefferson (theater critic) and Tim Page (classical music editor) both went on to win Pulitzer Prizes at other publications.

In a 1985 review, publisher Bonnie Marranca wrote of her efforts in 1975 to get Performing Arts Journal started. At the time, she was writing for SWN, which she described as "renegade" and "a fledgling publication, with no pretense to paying writers". She had lined up printing services but was facing the even larger expense of typesetting; SWN's publisher (unnamed but presumably Goldstein) knew of Marranca's plans and offered to provide her typesetting services for the first three issues at no cost in exchange for another year of her writing for free, which she accepted. Marranca again wrote about SWN in 1995, reflecting on her experiences as a theater critic there during 1975–1977. She described the paper as "one of the respected, opinion-shaping newspapers at that time, featuring extensive coverage of the burgeoning downtown arts scene".

=== Photography ===
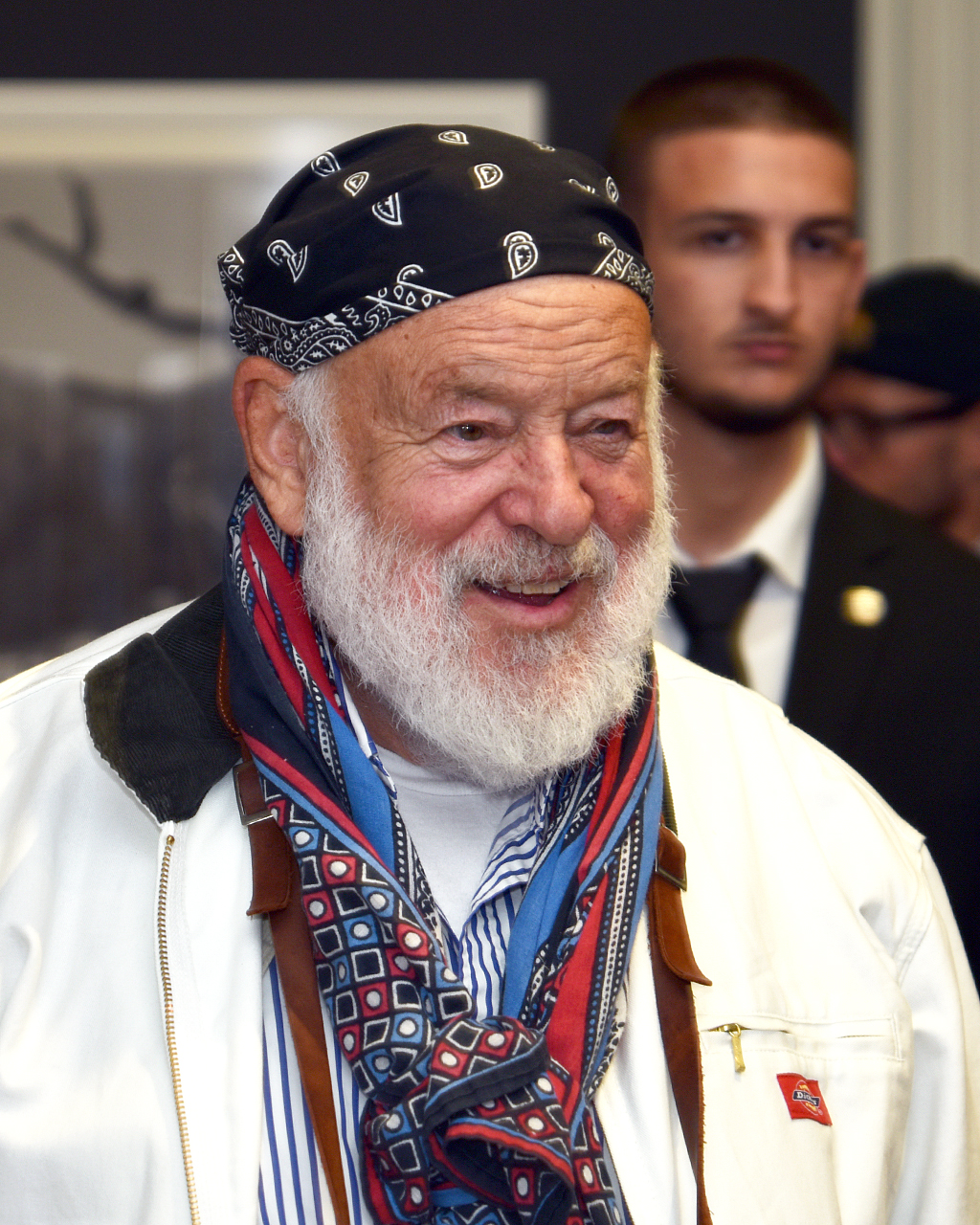
Fashion photographer Bruce Weber in 2024

The photography staff included Allan Tannenbaum, Timothy Greenfield-Sanders, Bruce Weber, Bill Cunningham, and Marcia Resnick. Cunningham, who had been recruited by Annie Flanders, wrote a style feature called Bill Cunningham's Sunday. He then went on to a long career at The New York Times as a photojournalist, producing his On the Street and Evening Hours columns. Tannenbaum was known for his coverage of rock music, having photographed David Bowie, John Lennon and Yoko Ono, and the Rolling Stones. Greenfield-Sanders has work on display at the Museum of Modern Art and the National Portrait Gallery, and was featured in American Master: The Boomer List on PBS. Resnick's portraits of well-known people ran regularly. She also produced a photo-satire column, pairing mysterious photos with inventive stories; originally titled "Resnick's Believe-it-or-Not", it was renamed to "Resnick's Believe It" after a complaint from Ripley's Believe It or Not!.

Bruce Weber's controversial 1978 series of photos featuring model Jeff Aquilon clad only in high-priced underwear from Saks Fifth Avenue was described years later in The New York Times as "flagrantly erotic" by Herbert Muschamp and as having "become legend" by John Duka. Katya Foreman of the BBC labeled it as "iconic ... [defining] a new ideal for male models". The 2020 independent film Rise of the Male Supermodel described the story as "an intimate portrayal of a young athletic man", saying that "the male form as a sexualized object was historically the focus of gay porn, not mass media" but that Weber had "[legitimized] the notion for the mainstream".

Interviewed a few months after SWN shut down, Weber spoke about the shoot. Assigned by Annie Flanders to do a men's underwear feature, Weber wanted to present the subject "with voluptuousness", the same way women were traditionally photographed. After the piece ran, Saks cancelled its advertising due to the erotic nature of the photos; this announcement was greeted with a round of applause from the staff because, as SWN fashion director Paul Cavaco put it, "it was all about, at that moment, how far can we push things, how far can we go against the norm of what fashion is supposed to be, of what people think of male models, of what male beauty is, of what is acceptable for men to show."

== Editorial stance on gentrification ==
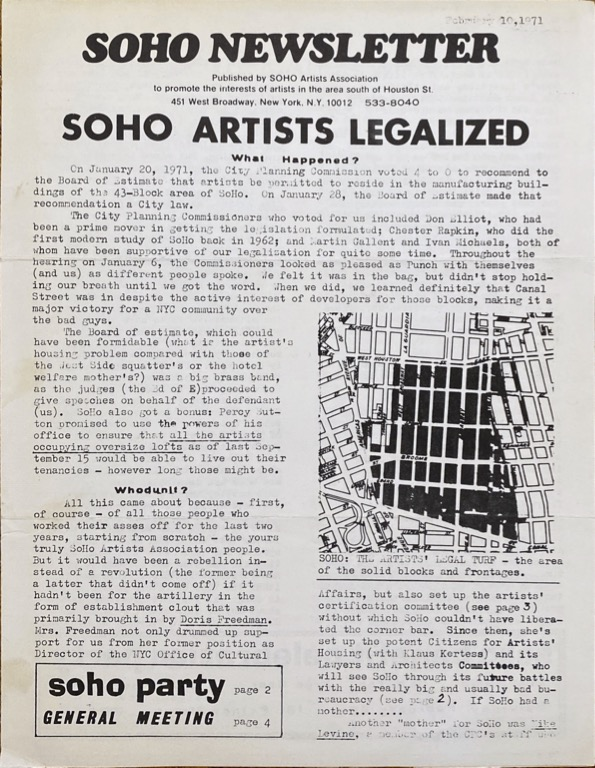
Newsletter of the SoHo Artist's Association

Originally a manufacturing district, the blocks between Houston and Canal Streets and between Lafayette Street and West Broadway started to attract artists in the late 1950s. Seeking room to work and low rents, they (often illegally) occupied factory lofts with wide open spaces and good lighting. The area gained a neighborhood identity when urban planner Chester Rapkin coined the name SoHo (South of Houston) in 1962.

Groups such as the Artist Tenants Association and the SoHo Artists Association pushed for changes to zoning laws to legalize these occupancies and legitimacy came in 1971 with the passage of the so-called Artist in Residence law. Initially, certificates of occupancy were only issued to buildings occupied exclusively by artists, but gradually this requirement became ignored and wealthy non-artists began to move in. Rising property values eventually drove out the artists in what The New York Times would later call the "SoHo effect".

SWN was an outspoken critic of this commercialization and gentrification. In a 2003 review of the revitalization of the neighborhood, however, Stephen Petrus (then a doctoral candidate in history) argued that SWN actually contributed to gentrification through its enthusiastic coverage of trendy local businesses. He gave as an example a two-part 1973 series which explored more than two dozen SoHo retail establishments. In October of that year, SWN also devoted its front page to coverage of the New York City Landmarks Preservation Commission having designated the area a historic district. Petrus said that SWN's classified ads for loft space contributed to the increase in rents which priced artists out of the area, eschewing its role as a neighborhood watchdog in favor of competing directly with The Village Voice.

In 1974, SWN inaugurated a Loft of the Week feature highlighting opulent residences. The first installment covered the home of fashion designer Valerie Porr, described as "[one of the] most fascinating spaces in SoHo". The paper touted the advantages of converted lofts, writing, "Living in a loft gives you a whole new dimension in space and space relationships to work with." SWN writer Jim Stratton took a contrary stance. In response to a 1974 piece in New York Magazine which called SoHo "The Most Exciting Place to Live in the City", he lamented the influx of wealthy people who could "buy a loft in SoHo and send an artist to Brooklyn" and that when people came to artists' lofts, they were coming more to look at the real estate than the artwork.

== Music and arts coverage ==
=== Punk scene ===
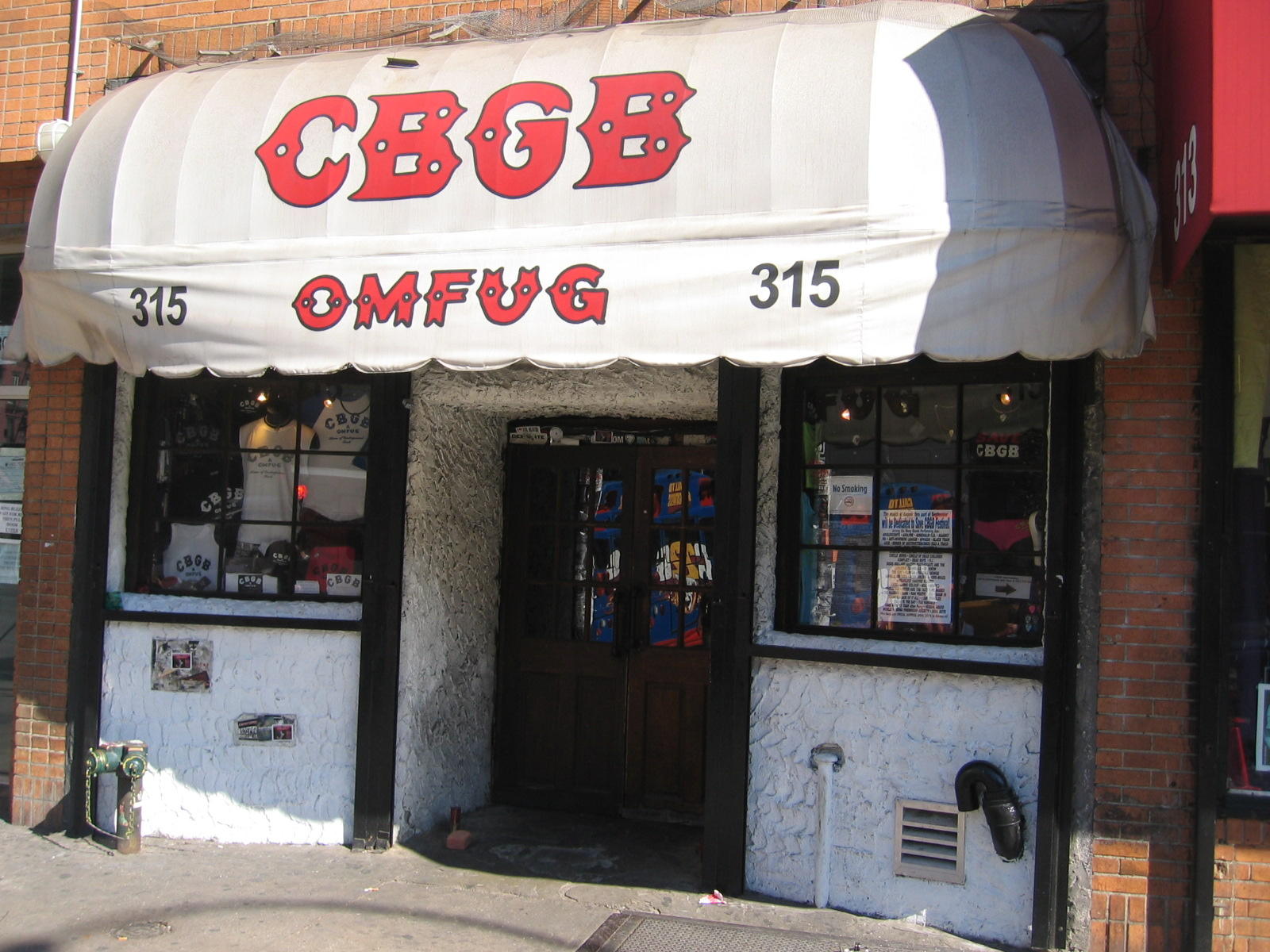
CBGB in 2005

SWN was known for its coverage of new musical artists in downtown New York; it was, for example, one of the first papers to interview the Ramones. In 1975, Tommy Ramone explained to SWN staffer Alan Betrock why the band's performances moved so quickly: "We play short songs and short sets for people who don't have a lot of spare time."

In an interview shortly after Goldstein's death, SWN music editor Peter Occhiogrosso credited Goldstein's experience with New York's music and nightclub scene below 14th Street and particularly below Houston Street for driving SWN's music focus and for its ability to differentiate itself from The Village Voice. Author Richard Boch described how many of the SWN staff would frequent the nearby Mudd Club each night, recalling that Goldstein often went dressed in a brass-button navy blazer, "looking like a country club admiral". In a 2020 interview, Kim Hastreiter spoke about her experiences at SWN:

It was totally wild west at [the SoHo News]. You got there [at] one in the afternoon. You didn't have to go to work till then because everyone was up all night at the clubs. You had to go to the Mudd Club to find the art director and then drag her back to the office at two in the morning to do your layouts. It was crazy there. We had a drug dealer that would come to the office. Everyone was smoking pot.

In his book Between Montmartre and the Mudd Club, Bernard Gendron wrote about the music scene at CBGB; he described the club as "an altogether unlikely site for a major cultural movement", noting that it filled a void after the nearby Mercer Art Center was destroyed in a building collapse. CBGB hosted new bands such as Television, the Ramones, and Blondie, but the venue was largely ignored by The Village Voice and The New York Times, relying instead on coverage from the alternative press: SWN early on, followed by the fanzines Punk and New York Rocker. In 1978, for example, SWN ran an interview with Talking Heads. SWN staffer Michael Gross described how the band played at CBGB, Max's Kansas City, and The Kitchen, with the members working day jobs and living in substandard housing on nearby Chrystie Street before signing any record contracts.

In its c. 2023 Video Lounge exhibit, the Museum of the City of New York explored the paper's leading role in covering the New York music scene, comparing its coverage most directly to the East Village Eye and more distantly to The Village Voice and New York Rocker.

=== Other areas ===
In 2002, dance critic Elizabeth Zimmer wrote that The Village Voice and SWN were the two main publications that offered space for young dance critics in New York starting their careers after the dance boom of the mid-1960s. The SWN arts coverage ranged from local talent to mainstream; one article on dance included a performance in a Mercer Street loft alongside one at the Metropolitan Opera House by the American Ballet Theatre.

SWN was among the first newspapers to cover filmmaker David Lynch's feature-length directorial debut, Eraserhead. Village Voice film critic J. Hoberman wrote in a 2013 retrospective that the Voice and SWN were the only two newspapers to cover the film's 1977 release. He compared the two papers' approaches: his piece in the Voice was just two paragraphs tacked onto the end of another review he was already working on, while rival SWN ran an interview with Lynch. Film critic Jerry Oster lamented in his 1977 coverage of the New Directors/New Films Festival that The New York Times gave it minimal attention, and The Village Voice and The New Yorker none at all: "The most comprehensive coverage of the program was ceded to the scrappy irregulars of The SoHo Weekly News".

SWN was known for its coverage of local artists struggling to make a name for themselves. In a 2018 interview at the Museum of Modern Art, lyricist Scott Wittman told of the influence SWN had on promoting the acts of rising performers: "There was only one newspaper back then ... The SoHo Weekly News". He recounted his experience doing a show with Marc Shaiman at Club 57 in the East Village; after SWN published an enthusiastically positive review, the next week's performance was "packed with people like Jay Presson Allen, Mike Nichols, Joe Papp, and Allan Carr". In 1999, Gary Indiana wrote in Artforum:

There were plenty of artists of all types living there before this little boom thing in the mid-'80s. Most of the ones I knew never expected to have any type of commercial success. The biggest thing that ever happened to them was a mention in The Village Voice or the SoHo Weekly News.

=== Nancy Spungen murder ===
One night in October 1978, freelance crime reporter Ann Bardach was at the New York City morgue when a woman's body was delivered. Bardach later recalled that everybody assumed the dead woman was a prostitute but she recognized the woman from the Mudd Club and exclaimed, "Holy shit – that's Nancy Spungen!" None of the people at the morgue recognized the name, nor that of her punk rocker boyfriend Sid Vicious.

Bardach wrote a series of articles about Spungen's murder which were published by SWN. In 2025, Spungen biographer Jesse Pollack described the stories as "among the earliest and most influential pieces of journalism on the crime, [playing] an important role in shaping public understanding of it as well as the historical record". Bardach said she pitched the story to SWN because of how it covered the punk scene: "They recognized that it was a big deal".

== Mainstream news coverage ==
Although best known for its arts, local politics, and lifestyle coverage centered on downtown Manhattan, SWN also had some mainstream news coverage. This type of reporting increased during the 1978 New York City newspaper strike, when journalists such as Howard Thompson, Peter Freiberg, Eric Fettmann, and Clyde Haberman temporarily signed on to SWN after their papers were struck. According to SWN editor Al Ellenberg, circulation and advertising both had significant increases during this time.

In 1976, Arizona Republic reporter Don Bolles was killed by a car bomb while on assignment investigating corruption and organized crime in Arizona. The newly formed Investigative Reporters and Editors Task Force conducted an extensive investigation, picking up the job Bolles had begun and producing an 80,000-word report. Major newspapers such as The New York Times and The Washington Post declined to be part of the investigation but SWN printed the entire report as a 32-page supplement.

In 1978, former US president Richard Nixon wrote a book of his memoirs, RN: The Memoirs of Richard Nixon. Despite tight security around the manuscript, SWN obtained copies of galley proofs of five pages from the upcoming book and published them, scooping the dozens of other papers which had paid for serialization rights. According to Goldstein, the galleys came from "a group of people who wanted to show that [Nixon] was 'back in the deletion business'" and they arrived unsolicited.

== Henry Benvenuti incident ==
On November 26, 1979, 27-year-old graphic artist Henry Benvenuti walked into the SWN office and asked to see Gerald Marzorati. Benvenuti had reportedly spoken to Marzorati earlier in the day by telephone, accusing him of being "just like all the other art writers". Told he could not see Marzorati, Benvenuti said "I'm doing this in the name of art," chopped off two of his own fingers with a hatchet, and walked out. Doctors at Bellevue Hospital were unable to reattach the fingers.

Benvenuti, who was struggling financially, was connected to the SoHo punk scene: his art was displayed at the Mudd Club and his photograph hung on the wall. Interviewed at Bellevue, he expressed disappointment at the lack of attention his exhibition at a SoHo gallery had received a year earlier and said that his self-mutilation at the SWN office was "to protest the plight of starving artists". Paul Richard of The Washington Post likened Benvenuti's actions to incidents of self-harm by other artists, most notably Van Gogh's cutting off his own ear.

== Decline and shutdown ==
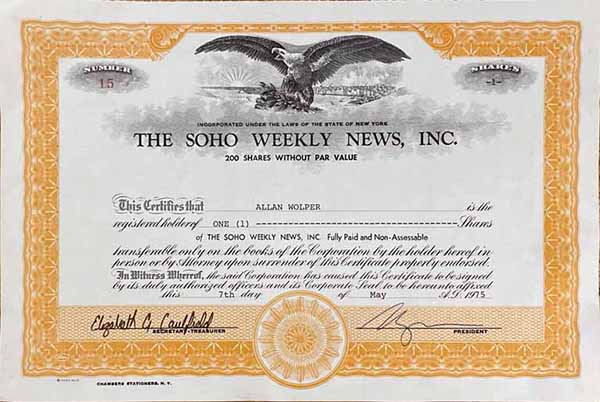
SoHo Weekly News stock certificate

The paper's circulation was variable, at one point dipping as low as 14,000. In May 1978, the English Associated Newspaper Group (ANG), led by Vere Harmsworth, paid $250,000 (equivalent to $967,000 in 2025) for a 25% share in SWN. Reportedly, this was in response to media mogul Rupert Murdoch (with whom Harmsworth had been feuding) having bought The Village Voice the previous year. A year later, Goldstein stated that the paper had an annual revenue of $1.1 million (equivalent to $8,000,000 in 2025) and its circulation was 60,000; it was reported, however, that the paper was losing money.

ANG bought out the remaining stake in 1979 and named British newspaper editor John Leese as publisher and editor-in-chief. In 1981, Leese announced that the paper's continued losses could not be sustained and instituted changes intended to make the paper profitable. Columns by Allan Wolper, Doug Ireland, and Peter Freiberg were cancelled and a new graphic designer was hired.

Leese said that large potential advertisers such as Macy's were avoiding the paper because they thought it was "too gay" and cancelled plans for an upcoming gay-themed supplement. Managing editor Rob Manoff said he was working to change SWN's reputation as an alternative paper, aiming for an upscale audience and reducing the paper's focus on the SoHo neighborhood. He also wanted to shed the paper's reputation as a "punk-rock rag".

In the fall of 1981, ANG announced plans to close or sell the paper by February 1982. Although there were negotiations with possible purchasers which continued beyond the original deadline, ongoing losses ($1.7 million in the previous year, equivalent to $12,300,000 in 2025) forced ANG to shut down the paper in March. The closing was despite an increase in circulation in the last year, variously reported as either 12 to 15 percent or almost doubled. The last issue, dated March 10–16, 1982, had a print run of 40,000 copies, carried a cover price of $0.75 (equivalent to $2.50 in 2025) and featured a front-page story about actor John Belushi. The next issue was in production at the time the paper was officially shut down, but never reached the newsstands. At the time of the shutdown, the staff numbered about 70 people, of whom 25 were full-time reporters and editors. The shutdown of SWN left ANG with interests in two other American publications: The American Lawyer and Esquire magazine.

=== Final decision ===
The unionization of the paper in its last year of operation was a factor in the ultimate decision to close; in response to voting in the union, ANG instructed Leese to either shut down or sell the paper. This damaged staff morale, although The Washington Post reported that staff reaction to the announcement was "bittersweet". Leese said the paper had lost $2 million in the previous year on operations, with no prospects of making the paper profitable. Despite growing circulation, the paper needed to increase advertising by six pages per issue, which the owners did not believe was possible. Another spokesman put the total losses at $6 million.

Reflecting on her time at SWN after being informed of the shutdown, dance reviewer Marcia Siegel wrote that it was widely known that the paper was in financial trouble. She put some of the blame on Goldstein, saying that his inexperience in the business made him underestimate how much money it would take to start a newspaper in New York. Siegel likened hearing the final news of the paper's demise to hearing of "the sudden death of a friend".

According to Leese, attempts to sell the paper had been unsuccessful, even at a price he described as "nominal". In contrast to most descriptions of the paper, he said that SWN did not consider itself an alternative newspaper, and that it appealed to a young and affluent audience. Comparing SWN to the older Voice, he said it "had a virtual monopoly of classified (advertising) for a weekly publication. ... If you want an apartment, The Voice is the paper to look at. It's very difficult to compete with that kind of stranglehold".

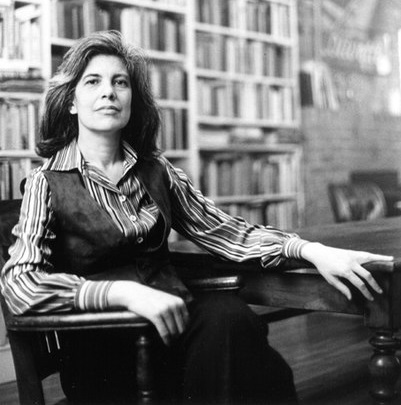
Susan Sontag

Contributing to the downfall was a pending lawsuit by essayist Susan Sontag. On February 6, 1982, Sontag gave a speech critical of communism at The Town Hall. Later that month, SWN published Sontag's comments (as did The Nation). This coverage proved popular with SWN's readership but prompted Sontag to file a $50,000 (equivalent to $167,000 in 2025) lawsuit against the paper for alleged copyright infringement. Sontag said she would have preferred the speech to be printed in The New York Times, but the Times declined to do so once the speech appeared in, as she put it, "the dreadful SoHo News".

=== Reaction ===
In a 2020 interview, Kim Hastreiter described ANG as "these stupid people in England, who didn't know anything", saying, "All of a sudden, it was shut down and I didn't have a job." The final decision to close the business was made at noon, and the newsroom staff were informed by Leese at 4 pm, with instructions to clean out their desks immediately. Senior editor Eve Ottenberg said, "I don't think anybody burst into tears ... People were just kind of tired. They sort of expected it, but some of the people were angry".

In a 1996 interview on Berks Community Television, William Zimmer spoke of his experiences as the second art critic at SWN, succeeding John Perreault. He said SWN was "a little before its time" and that it would have been more successful if it could have survived for a few more years, the 1980s being "the golden decade for SoHo". He lamented that ANG, with its investments in North Sea oil under financial pressure from falling prices, shut the paper down so suddenly: he said the order came at 2 o'clock on a Tuesday afternoon and the staff were not even permitted to finish work on the issue due to come out the next day.

After SWN closed down, Zimmer wrote for The New York Times as art critic for their suburban sections. He described how SWN differed from the Times:

You were writing for a hip audience ... it was like being a little bit of a mini-celebrity: you could walk down the street after having written something and people would congratulate you, or argue with you, or something: You were noticed.

The day after the shutdown, The New York Times said SWN had been "a weekly journal of counter-cultural news and opinion for New York City". In an op-ed a few days later, Tim Page called SWN the "alternative to alternative papers", describing it as "a most interesting little paper: breezy, intelligent, witty, joyously Epicurean, wildly uneven". The paper's contributors were described as an eccentric mix of "neo-conservatives and Marxists, radical feminists and hedonistic libertines, chronic potheads and antidrug crusaders". Page described the poor physical condition of the paper's office: too hot in the summer, too cold in the winter, having a serious rat infestation problem, and stocked with office equipment that did not always work.

A 2018 retrospective in The New York Times Style Magazine included the closure of SWN as one of the "events that transformed the city over three extraordinary years"; Jennifer Conrad wrote that "Alternative paper The SoHo News [was] for eight and a half years the chronicler of the burgeoning downtown arts scene". In 2023, The New York Times said that SWN's greatest success was in the 1970s and its demise in 1982 gave Leonard Abrams's East Village Eye the opportunity to take its place writing about many of the same topics: the destructive influence of crack cocaine, the onslaught of the AIDS epidemic, and the continuing gentrification of SoHo.
