= Michael Goldstein =

American music publicist and newspaper founder (1938–2018)

- Born: June 7, 1938; Shaker Heights, Ohio, US
- Died: May 19, 2018 (aged 79); New York, US
- Education: Boston University
- Occupation: Music publicist
- Known for: SoHo Weekly News

Michael Goldstein (June 7, 1938 – May 19, 2018) was an American music publicist and journalist who was the founder of the SoHo Weekly News, an alternative newspaper published in New York City from 1973 to 1982. Prior to starting the paper, he worked in public relations. As a music publicist, his clients included Jimi Hendrix, Sly Stone, Rod Stewart, Eric Clapton, Janis Joplin, Frank Zappa, Jefferson Airplane, and the Grateful Dead.

Goldstein was born on June 7, 1938, in Shaker Heights, Ohio. He was educated at Boston University, where he studied opera. He was married to Nancy Arnold Goldstein, and had three daughters; Jocelyn, Marissa, and Gillian. From 1972 until his death, he lived at 450 Broome Street in SoHo, Manhattan, where he maintained a rooftop garden. That garden was the setting for a photograph by Allan Tannenbaum of Patti Smith posing in a wading pool with her underpants pulled down.

After Goldstein's death, Yukie Ohta of the SoHo Memory Project described him as "One of SoHo's great influencers". According to Ohta, Goldstein came to start the News "after being burnt out by a successful career in public relations." He had worked with 10 performers at the 1969 Woodstock Music Festival, represented 17 different acts in the Rock & Roll Hall of Fame and claimed to have been "associated with all the top talent in the music world that came through New York".

After the News folded, Goldstein was involved with a variety of business ventures. He ran a short-lived newspaper, The Wall Street Final. In the 1980s and 1990s, he sold merchandise on the Home Shopping Network. He worked for CBS News as a reporter, and had a role in Woody Allen's 1980 movie, Stardust Memories. Goldstein died at home on May 19, 2018, of pancreatic cancer.
