= East Village Eye =

American magazine (1979–1987)

The East Village Eye's logo

The East Village Eye was a cultural magazine, published by editor-in-chief Leonard Abrams, in circulation from May 1979 until January 1987. Based in the East Village section of New York City, the publication covered a range of locally focused topics, including art, politics and gentrification. The East Village Eye, colloquially referred to as The Eye, covered topics such as the emergence of punk rock, hip hop, and fashion as fringe pop culture, the AIDS pandemic, as well as the burgeoning art and nightlife scenes that highlighted NYC's East Village neighborhood during the 1980s.

The Eye lays claim to be the first publication to print and define the term "hip hop" in an interview between writer/subculturalist Michael Holman and Afrika Bambaataa.

== History ==
Leonard Abrams started the East Village Eye after moving to the East Village in the mid-1970s. He told the New Yorker decades later, that he knew that the kind of newspaper he wanted to run "required a social movement and a scene." Its first office was at 167 Ludlow Street, moving repeatedly in and around this relatively inexpensive pocket of downtown Manhattan. The magazine had a total of 72 issues with Robert Mapplethorpe, Sade, and local musician John Lurie among its cover stars.

The Eye reached a peak circulation of 10,000 copies per month, available throughout New York City and outposts in San Francisco, Chicago, Los Angeles and Minneapolis. The magazine became a marketplace for the local economy, with neighborhood businesses purchasing ad space. Writers included Carlo McCormick, Cookie Mueller, Gary Indiana, David Wojnarowicz, and artist and later Artnet writer Walter Robinson.

The Eye was most influential in the early 1980s, filling a gap after the closure of the SoHo Weekly News in 1982 and before the rise of Details magazine. The Eye is said to be the first publication to print a comprehensive definition of hip-hop in an interview in the January 1982 issue. In the interview by the writer Michael Holman with Afrika Bambaataa the term was summarized as “the all-inclusive tag for the rapping, breaking, graffiti-writing, crew-fashion-wearing street subculture.” It let the critic Steven Hager, who was fired from the New York Daily News for praising graffiti, write seriously about the medium.

Abrams shut the paper down after being stressed by the extensive work of running it, the lack of money that the paper generated, and the changing dynamics of the area caused by gentrification which forced out artists.

In 2023, Abrams sold the archive of the East Village Eye to the New York Public Library. It had been organized by a friend and stored with Abrams belongings in a storage locker in Ridgewood, Queens.
