= Leonard Abrams =

American journalist (1954–2023)

- Abrams in 2017
- Born: December 19, 1954; New York City, U.S.
- Died: April 1, 2023 (aged 68); New Jersey Turnpike, U.S.
- Education: Fordham University
- Occupation: Journalist

Leonard Abrams (December 19, 1954 – April 1, 2023) was an American journalist and the founder of East Village Eye. His partner for the last decade of his life was the writer, Angela Sloan.

== Early life and education ==
Abrams was born on December 19, 1954, in Brooklyn, New York. His father was a furrier and later a securities trader. His mother was a bank executive.

Abrams studied literature at Fordham University.

== Career ==
In 1976, he moved to the East Village and started working as a bicycle messenger. In May 1979, the first edition of the East Village Eye was published, with Abrams credited as editor-in-chief. It covered topics such as the emergence of punk rock, hip hop, and fashion as well as the burgeoning art and nightlife scenes that were centered in the East Village neighborhood during the 1980s. The cultural magazine was in circulation from May 1979 until January 1987. The magazine had a total of 72 issues. The Eye was most influential in the early 1980s, filling a gap after the closure of the SoHo Weekly News in 1982 and before the rise of Details magazine. The Eye is said to be the first publication to print a comprehensive definition of hip-hop in an interview in the January 1982 issue. In the interview by the writer Michael Holman with Afrika Bambaataa the term was summarized as “the all-inclusive tag for the rapping, breaking, graffiti-writing, crew-fashion-wearing street subculture.”

Abrams shut the paper down after being stressed by the extensive work of running it, the lack of money that the paper generated, and the changing dynamics of the area caused by gentrification which forced out artists.

In 1987, he oversaw Hotel Amazon, a regular Lower East Side hip-hop party which featured acts such as Public Enemy, De La Soul, Queen Latifah, and A Tribe Called Quest.

In 2008, he wrote and directed the documentary Quilombo Country which tells the story of villages in Brazil founded by fugitive slaves.

In his later life, Abrams had a business importing Mexican religious items.

In 2023, Abrams sold the archive of the East Village Eye to the New York Public Library.

== Personal life ==
On April 1, 2023, Abrams died of a heart attack at a rest stop on the New Jersey Turnpike while returning to Queens from a business trip. He was 68 years old.
