= Marzorati =

Marzorati (Marzoratti) is a surname, and may refer to:

- Alfred Marzorati (1881–1955), Belgian lawyer and colonial administrator.
- Gerald Marzorati, sports journalist
- Guido Marzorati (born 1975), guitarist, singer, and songwriter.
- Lino Marzorati (born 1986), Italian footballer
- Pierluigi Marzorati (born 1952), Italian former professional basketball player.
