= Bonnie Marranca =

American critic and publisher

Bonnie Marranca is a New York City-based critic and publisher and the editor of PAJ: A Journal of Performance and Art, which she co-founded in 1976. She has written several collections of criticism, including Performance Histories (2008), Ecologies of Theatre (2012), and Timelines (2021). Her 1984 book Theatrewritings received the George Jean Nathan Award for Dramatic Criticism. Marranca has edited numerous anthologies of dramatic texts and criticism including New Europe: Plays from the Continent (2009), Plays for the End of the Century (1996), The Hudson Valley Reader (1995), and American Dreams: The Imagination of Sam Shepard (1981), in addition to The Theatre of Images (1977), a seminal collection featuring Robert Wilson, Lee Breuer, and Richard Foreman—early exponents of what was later termed postdramatic theatre. Published collections of her interviews include Conversations with Meredith Monk (2014) and Conversations on Art and Performance (1999). Marranca's essays have been translated into over twenty languages.

Marranca received a B.A. in English from Montclair State University before earning an M.A. in Theatre from Hunter College. She also studied at the University of Copenhagen. She later enrolled in Ph.D. Program in Theatre at the Graduate Center of The City University of New York, but withdrew in order to found Performing Arts Journal (with Gautam Dasgupta) and begin a professional career in arts publishing. In 1990, Marranca received the Witkacy Prize. A Fulbright Scholar and Guggenheim Fellow, Marranca was the recipient of the 2011 ATHE Excellence in Editing Award for Sustained Achievement, and was awarded the Leverhulme Trust Visiting Professorship in the United Kingdom. Most recently, she was a professor of theatre at Eugene Lang College, The New School for Liberal Arts. Marranca has previously taught at Columbia University, Princeton University, New York University, Duke University, the University of California-San Diego, Free University of Berlin, the Autonomous University of Barcelona Institute for Theatre, the University of Bucharest, and the Federal University of Rio de Janeiro. She was a theatre critic for the SoHo Weekly News from 1975 to 1977.
