= SoHo Memory Project =

American non-profit organisation

- Established: 2011
- Location: SoHo, New York, United States
- Type: Historical Archive
- Curator: Yukie Ohta
- Website: sohomemory.org

The SoHo Memory Project is a nonprofit organization that celebrates the history of SoHo with a focus on the years 1960–1980, when it was a thriving artists' community. It chronicles the neighborhood's evolution, charting cycles of development and placing current-day SoHo in the context of New York City's history. Its aim in preserving the past is to help the present generation make informed decisions about the future.

Founded by Yukie Ohta in 2011, the project began as a blog and has developed into a vast collection of stories told via conventional and unconventional media, including a digital archive of documents, photographs, videos, oral histories, objects, and ephemera.

The SoHo Memory Project focuses on the diverse families, businesses, and community groups that caused its becoming the retail and residential hub it is today.

== SoHo history ==
The area bounded by Houston Street to the north and Canal Street to the south is a neighborhood that has changed dramatically over a short period of time. That is part of what makes it such an important place to document and preserve according to Yukie Ohta, the SoHo Memory Project's founder, who says: "'New York changes so much, it's like instant nostalgia. It keeps changing in little ways and big ways. Everybody has their own New York, so that's why I'm asking for everybody's stories, because it's not just one story."

Like most of lower Manhattan in the Colonial Period, the area that SoHo now occupies was farmland. It was part of a block of land granted to former slaves freed from the Dutch West India Company. It developed into a residential district, until, in the mid-1800s, commercial buildings began to replace the houses. It became home to high-end retailers such as Lord & Taylor, Arnold Constable & Company, and Tiffany & Co., which were followed by theaters and upscale hotels such as the St. Nicholas.

The first of the now-iconic cast-iron loft buildings was built in the mid-1800s. New technology allowed the cast-iron facades to be manufactured at a foundry and then erected on site relatively quickly and cheaply. Small manufacturing concerns and brothels moved in, encouraging the emigration of the residential population.

By the end of the 19th century, the area was dominated by larger manufacturers, especially textile producers and machine shops. It remained a thriving industrial neighborhood until upheaval in the post WWII period, when textile manufacturers moved to the South, leaving many buildings empty. Some were converted into warehouses or printshops, others were replaced by auto garages and parking lots. The quantity of fires in the 40s and 50s, along with the deserted streets when the workers left for the day, lead to the nickname Hell's Hundred Acres.

In the late 1950s, artists in search of affordable studio space began to move into the neighborhood, in defiance of zoning laws that disallowed the buildings for residential use.

=== Art scene ===
The large, unobstructed spaces, cheap rent, and natural light attracted artists. The lofts allowed for a new way of living: where work and life, art-making and the social scene, blended together.

Nam June Paik and Chuck Close were early arrivals. Someone recalls hiring a plumber and his assistant was John Cage. Ohta recalls playing on a giant piece of foam in their new loft, only to discover later that it was a John Chamberlain sculpture.

Warhol, Haring, Oldenburg, Rauschenberg, Basquiat—the names of (now) art world luminaries show up constantly in the SoHo Memory Project archives. The first documented artist cooperative was on Wooster Street, founded in the late '60s by Fluxus movement creator George Maciunas, sometimes called "the father of SoHo." It was home not only to visual artists; Laurie Anderson, choreographer Trisha Brown, and a young Betsey Johnson all spent formative years there.

The artists attracted the galleries; Paula Cooper was the first to arrive, quickly followed by many more, including Sonnabend Gallery, 112 Greene Street (now White Columns), Leo Castelli Gallery, and The Kitchen. The SoHo Memory Project also memorializes smaller spaces now in danger of being lost to time, like the Museum of Holography or, more obscurely, Rick Parker's Barking Dog Museum.

Much of the artwork produced in this period was ephemeral, experiential, or poorly preserved, so it has been the project of many archivists and art historians to recover and document what they can. The SoHo Memory Project archive reveals how inseparable the art scene was from the neighborhood and community.

=== Lofts ===
Ohta recalls the SoHo of her childhood: "When I was a kid, it really felt like a small town – or what I imagine a small town would be like. We didn't have a single traffic light in SoHo. The kids played on the street, as there was no fear of getting hit by a car" It changed as the art scene became more established: "Then galleries started opening closer to the artists, people started coming to the galleries, and people started opening restaurants. [Then other] people wanted to live in these big spaces—like the artists—because it was so cool and appealing."

The SoHo loft, now synonymous with an ubiquitous, trendy aesthetic, was born out of economic and creative necessity. The SoHo Memory Project archive contains photographs of the renovation process and hand-written notes that document the informal nature of tenancy and cooperative building maintenance in this period. Oral histories describe a continuous, never-finished renovation process, with projects undertaken piecemeal when the owners could afford it. Often tradespeople were self-taught, doing work for barter.

There are documents pertaining to the struggle to get trash collection and the community organization that formed to prevent crime. Ohta describes it thus: "People came here from all over to be urban pioneers. Back then, it was like camping. There was no heat, there were no amenities— but there was lots of space."

These renovated lofts, with their improvised electrical and plumbing work, are now among the most desirable and expensive properties in New York City. Most of the galleries, along with many of the artists, have since been priced out of the area. This pattern of development, in which artists revitalize an industrial neighborhood and thereby gentrify it, has been reproduced in other New York neighborhoods and cities across the United States. As a result, SoHo has become an archetype in the history of urban development.

=== Activism ===
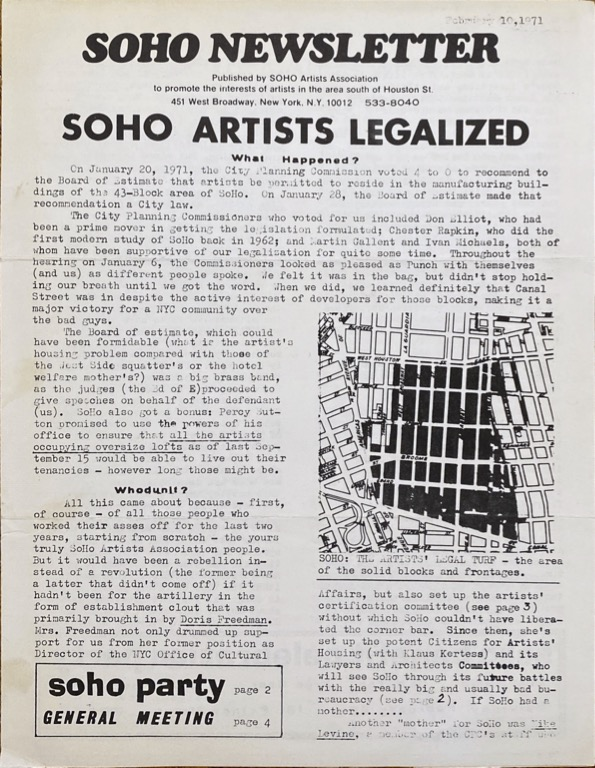
SoHo Artist Association Newsletter

The SoHo Memory Project archive contains many documents about the various legal struggles the neighborhood faced. Tenancy issues were fundamental as the area was not zoned for residential use. Artists Tenant Association and the SoHo Artists Association, later SoHo Alliance, were formed in the late 60s to centralize lobbying efforts to change zoning laws. In 1971, joint living and work quarters (JLWQ) were made legal for registered artists. The certification process was faulty and never well enforced, but theoretically, restrictions still exist today. These neighborhood activists resisted the destruction of historical buildings and advocated for adaptive reuse. Their efforts have helped to preserve the character of the neighborhood, which was formally landmarked as the SoHo–Cast Iron Historic District in 1973.

There is also material from Julie Finch (formerly Julie Judd) that details the neighborhood's fight with the city over the Lower Manhattan Expressway or LOMEX. A Robert Moses project that would have connected I-78 in NJ to Brooklyn, it was highly controversial from the beginning. In opposition, Finch founded Artists Against the Expressway, where she was joined by future art world luminaries such as Louise Nevelson, Barnett Newman and Frank Stella, among others.

== SoHo Memory Project Archive ==
The SoHo Memory Project Archive includes papers from the SoHo Alliance and its predecessor, the SoHo Artists Association; SoHo Playgroup; P.S.3; the Loft Board; and other neighborhood advocacy groups; as well as former and current SoHo residents.

The SoHo Memory Project's website presents firsthand accounts of what it was like to live and work in artists' SoHo. It has previously partnered with StoryCorps and the New York Public Library to interview longtime residents and collect oral histories.

On the website, articles and interviews are features alongside photographs, planning documents, and ephemera. Topics are cross-referenced with locations, a unique model for navigating an archive.

In 2021, it was announced that the physical archive will be acquired by the New-York Historical Society, where it will be preserved and made available to researchers.

== Mobile museum ==
In 2016 Ohta teamed up with Street Lab, a nonprofit that builds portable libraries and museums. Funded by a Kickstarter campaign, the mobile historical society or pop-up museum comprised a folding wooden cabinet on wheels. It had five areas of focus, Live, Work, Play, Eat, and Smell. Notable objects included a diorama of a converted loft and a menu from the artist-run FOOD restaurant (a short-lived but visionary space, part innovative restaurant, part experiment in relational aesthetics), and a guide to the local brothels from SoHo's period as a red-light district.

There were interactive elements including stereoscopes showing the progression of SoHo from 1700 to the present, and a tape recorder playing a 1979 WNYC radio show "Artists in the City," about the legal battle of loft tenants. There was also a smell station: jars which recreated the aromas of a leather tannery, a commercial bakery on Prince St., and a pepper factory at Broome Street and W Broadway.

The pop-up traveled between neighborhood art institutions, including the Judd Foundation and the Drawing Center, and it was displayed at block parties and workshops. Portions of it are now on loan and on display at the NYPL Mulberry Street Branch.

== Collaborations ==
In 2021 the SoHo Memory Project partnered with Gesso to create a GPS-based walking tour. Growing out of an in-person tour Ohta occasionally led, the walk includes iconic spaces such as the Judd Foundation, Housing Works Bookstore and Vesuvio Bakery. In the recorded audio, historical information is layered with personal recollections of growing up in SoHo.

For Uniqlo's celebration of 15 years in America, the SoHo Memory Project curated an exhibition in their flagship Broadway location. In 2018 the SoHo Memory Project consulted on Gucci's Wooster St. space, a bookstore and screening room that celebrates the creative legacy of the neighborhood. Ohta curated a series of short films highlighting the cultural significance of SoHo in the 1970s and 80s.

== Yukie Ohta ==
Yukie Ohta is the founder and driving force behind the SoHo Memory Project. An archivist and writer, she is a SoHo native and current resident. Her parents were Japanese immigrants who moved to America for its artistic as well as economic possibilities. Her family lived first on Crosby Street, then moved to a loft on Mercer when Ohta was 5. The building was converted into a loft condominium, where she now lives with her partner, visual artist Arnaud Gibersztajn, and daughter.

She has received recognition for her work on the SoHo Memory Project with the New York Preservation Archive Project's 2021 Preservation Award and a nomination for a 2023 GANYC Apple Award in the category of "Outstanding Achievement in Support of NYC (Preservation).
