= Allan Tannenbaum =

American photographer

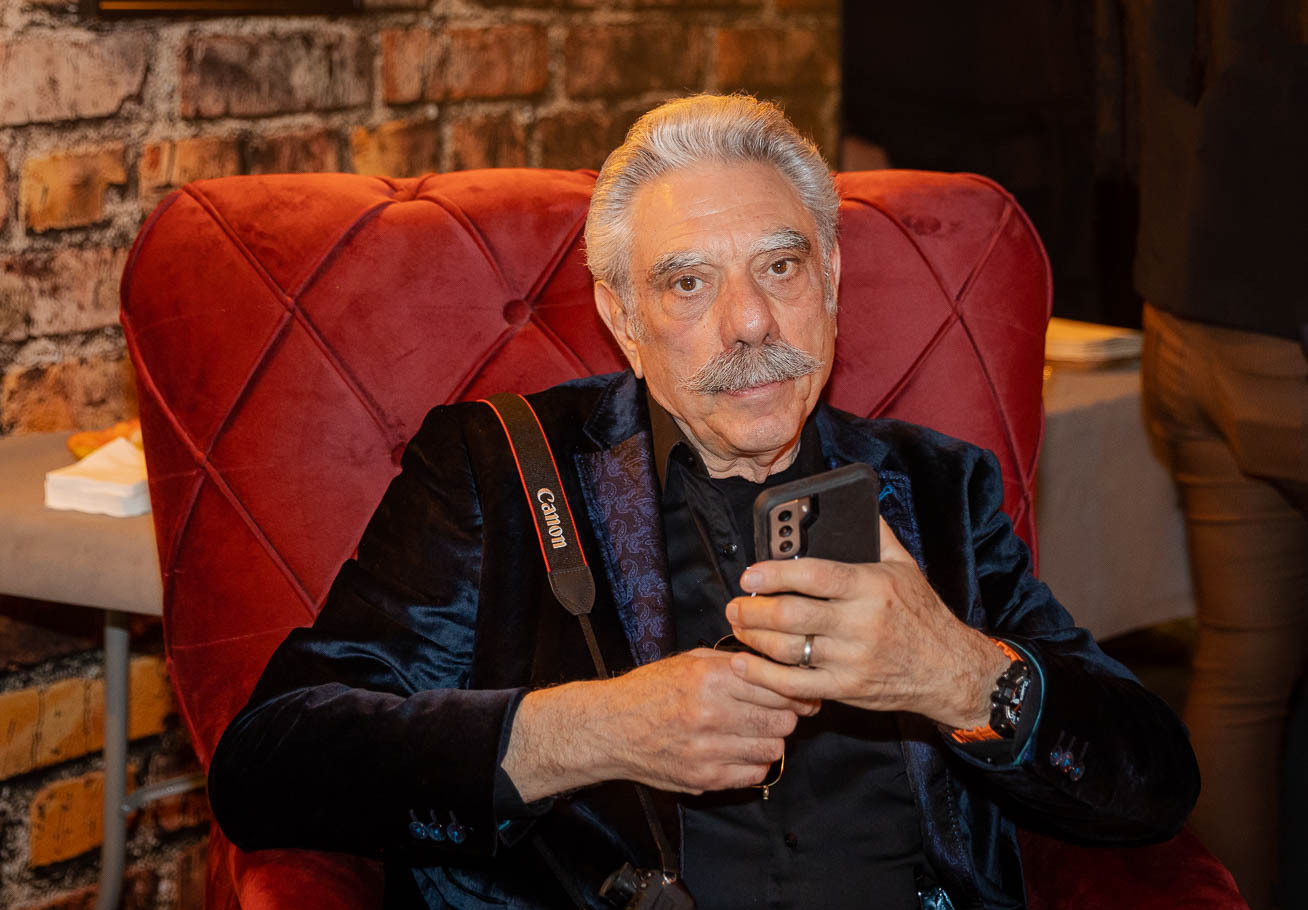
- Born: Passaic, New Jersey, U.S.
- Occupations: Photographer, Photojournalist, Filmmaker, Author
- Years active: 1965 - Present
- Known for: More than 50 years of Photojournalism in New York City, USA, and International
- Notable work: New York in the 70s "John & Yoko: A New York Love Story" "Grit and Glamour - The Street Style, High Fashion, and Legendary Music of the 1970s"
- Spouse: Debora F.R. Tannenbaum
- Website: http://sohoblues.com http://sohobluesgallery.com

Allan Tannenbaum is an American photographer. He has worked for the SoHo Weekly News until it shut down in 1982, worked for Sygma Photo News until 2000, and then Polaris Images. He won a World Press Photo General News Award. He photographed many Rock icons in the 1970s and the New Yorker referred to him as a Rock n' Roll photographer in 2007.

In 1978, Tannenbaum photographed Sid Vicious in handcuffs leaving the hotel room where his girlfriend was dead. He also photographed The Ramones. He took the cover photograph for Nelson Mandela's book Long Walk to Freedom. The band Devo used a photo he took for the SoHo Weekly News for their album cover on Duty Now for the Future. Tannenbaum also did the cover photography for Ten Percent, male vocal quartet Double Exposure's debut studio album released in 1976. He photographed performance artist Stephen Varble.

In 2001 he photographed the aftermath of the 9/11 terrorist attack.

He wrote about New York in the 1970s and his experiences.

He photographed John Lennon and Yoko Ono nude in bed together.

== Bibliography ==
- New York in the 70s by Allan Tannenbaum (2003)
- New York by Allan Tannenbaum (2004)
- John and Yoko: A New York Love Story by Allan Tannenbaum (2007)
- Grit and Glamour - The Street Style, High Fashion, and Legendary Music of the 1970s (2016)
