= Gerald Marzorati =

American journalist

Gerald Marzorati is a sports journalist who writes about tennis for The New Yorker. He is also a contributing editor to the journal Racquet. He is the author of Late to the Ball (Scribner, 2016), a memoir about his learning to play tennis and becoming a competitive senior player.

Marzorati was born in Paterson, New Jersey. He attended Villanova University, graduating in 1975. He is married to Barbara Mundy, an art historian and professor at Fordham University. They have two sons. Marzorati spent more than 30 years as a magazine editor. He was art editor at The Soho News and worked at Harper's Magazine and The New Yorker before joining the staff of The New York Times Magazine in 1994. He became the editor of the New York Times Magazine in 2003, and remained in that post until 2010. He joined the masthead of the New York Times in 2006, and remained an Assistant Managing Editor until 2011. He then moved to the publishing side of the newspaper, where he worked to get the Times into the conference business and other new initiatives. He retired at the end of 2015. He is also the author of A Painter of Darkness (1990), a book about Leon Golub, for which he received the PEN/Martha Albrand Award for First Nonfiction in 1991.
