= Annie Flanders =

American editor and publisher (1939–2022)

Annie Flanders (10 June 1939 – 10 March 2022) was an American publisher.

== Biography ==
Flanders was born in the Bronx, New York City, as Marcia Weinraub to Dorothy (Lautman) and Ralph "Lefty" Weinraub. She attended New York University, where she studied retailing and journalism and was named Miss New York University in 1959.

Her career began in the retail sector, including roles at Gimbels department store. Later, she opened a boutique named Abracadabra in New York. Flanders adopted her professional name after meeting her partner, Chris Flanders, who suggested she change it from her birth name, Marcia.

In the 1970s, Flanders contributed to The SoHo News as a style editor. In 1982, she used her savings to launch Details, a publication initially focused on Downtown Manhattan's culture and lifestyle. The magazine, starting with a circulation of 10,000 copies, was known for its unique editorial approach, blending fashion, culture, and nightlife reporting. Flanders' tenure at Details ended two years after its acquisition by Advance Publications in 1988.

Following her career in publishing, Flanders transitioned to real estate in Hollywood, Los Angeles, working with her daughter Rosie. She died in 2022 in Los Angeles.
