= The Wall Street Final =

The Wall Street Final was an American weekday afternoon business newspaper first published on June 16, 1980, in New York City by publisher Michael Goldstein. The Wall Street Final intended on delivering the latest business news and information related to the closing prices on the stock market that day. The newspaper folded two months later on August 18, 1980, due to computer problems, erratic deliveries, and increased competitive measures undertaken by both the New York Daily News and the New York Post.
