= PAJ (journal) =

PAJ: A Journal of Performance and Art
- Discipline: Performing arts
- Language: English
- Edited by: Bonnie Marranca

Publication details
- Former name(s): Performing Arts Journal
- History: 1976-present
- Publisher: MIT Press (United States)
- Frequency: Triannually

Standard abbreviations
- ISO 4: PAJ

Indexing
- ISSN: 1520-281X (print); 1537-9477 (web)
- LCCN: 98658205
- JSTOR: 1520281X
- OCLC no.: 39511092

Links
- Journal homepage; Online access; Journal page on Project MUSE

PAJ: A Journal of Performance and Art, originally Performing Arts Journal, is a triannual academic journal of the arts that was established in 1976 by Gautam Dasgupta and Bonnie Marranca, who still is the editor-in-chief. It has taken a particular interest in contemporary performance art and features expanded coverage in video, drama, dance, installations, media, and music and publishes essays, interviews and artists' writings, reviews of new exhibitions, performances, and books, and also plays and performance texts from the United States and elsewhere. The journal is published by MIT Press. PAJ Publications, the journal's book division, regularly publishes plays and essay collections on theater and performance.

== Abstracting and indexing ==
The journal is abstracted and indexed in:

- Arts and Humanities Citation Index
- Current Contents/Arts & Humanities
- EBSCO databases
- International Bibliography of Periodical Literature
- Modern Language Association Database
- ProQuest databases
- Scopus

== Books ==
PAJ Publications, the journal's book division, publishes titles on theater and performance. The book division's long-running series Word Plays was dedicated to new American theatre, while Drama Contemporary collected translations of new plays from across Europe and Asia. Performance Ideas has featured plays, essays, and conversations.

Previously affiliated with Johns Hopkins University Press, PAJ Publications is currently distributed through Theatre Communications Group.
