= SoHo, Manhattan =

Neighborhood in New York City

SoHo
- Neighborhood of Manhattan
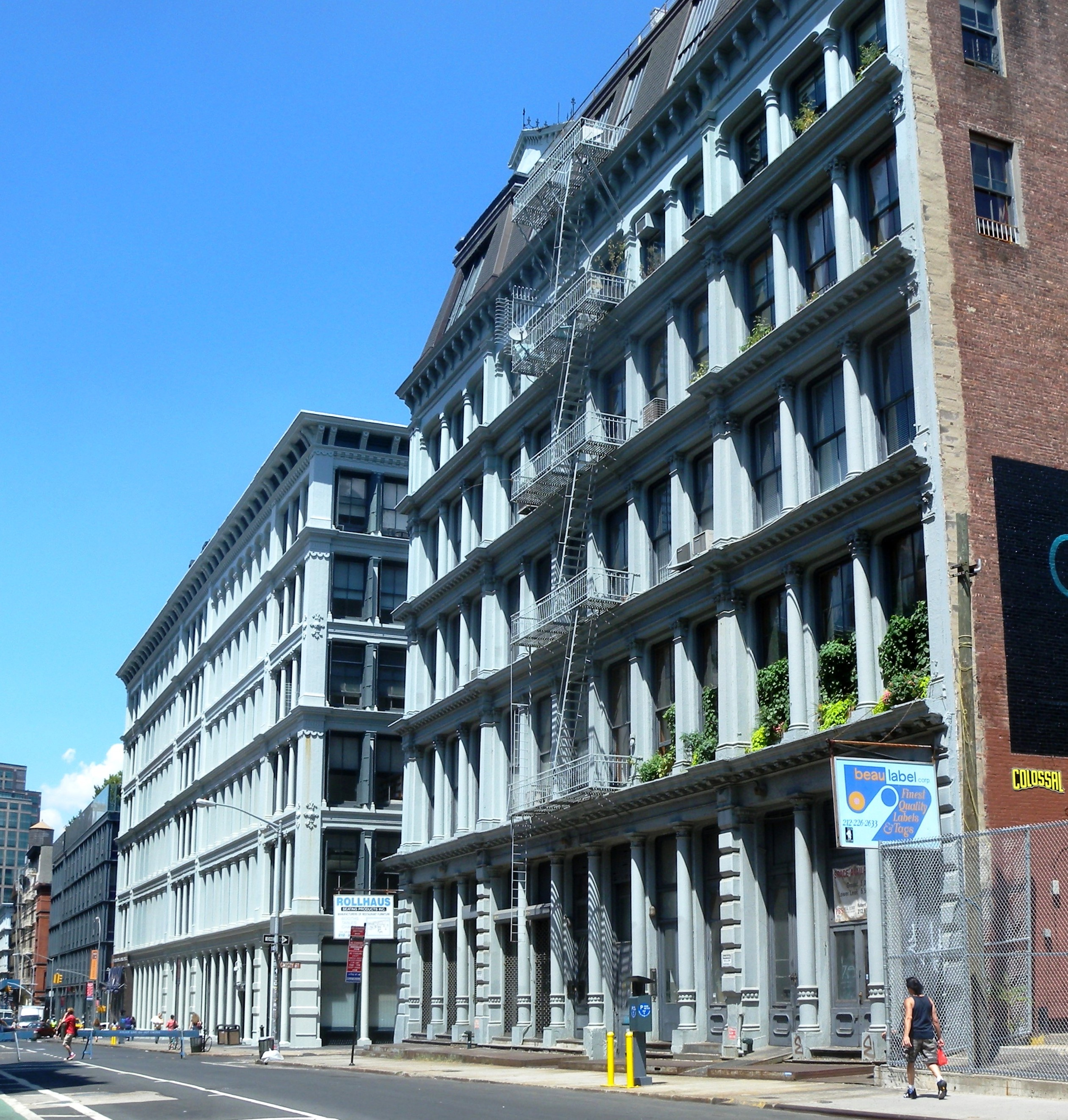
- Cast-iron buildings on Grand Street between Lafayette Street and Broadway
- Interactive map of SoHo
- Coordinates: 40°43′27″N 74°0′4″W
- Country: United States
- State: New York
- City: New York City
- Borough: Manhattan
- Community District: Manhattan 2
- Named for: "South of Houston Street"

Area
  - Total: 0.336 sq mi (0.87 km^{2})

Population (2019)
  - Total: 18,894
  - Density: 56,200/sq mi (21,700/km^{2})

Economics
  - Median income: $135,083
- Time zone: UTC−5 (Eastern)
  - Summer (DST): UTC−4 (EDT)
- ZIP codes: 10012, 10013
- Area code: 212, 332, 646, and 917
- SoHo–Cast Iron Historic District
- U.S. National Register of Historic Places
- U.S. National Historic Landmark District
- New York State Register of Historic Places
- New York City Landmark
- Location within Manhattan Location within New York City
- Location: Roughly north to south: Houston to Canal Streets; and west to east: West Broadway or Sixth Avenue to Crosby Street or Lafayette Street; Manhattan, New York City
- Coordinates: 40.723°N 74.000°W
- Area: 73 acres (30 ha)
- Architectural style: Renaissance; Italianate some Federal
- NRHP reference No.: 78001883
- NYCL No.: 0768, 2362

Significant dates
- Added to NRHP: June 29, 1978
- Designated NYSRHP: June 23, 1980
- Designated NYCL: August 14, 1973; May 11, 2010 (extension)

SoHo, short for "South of Houston Street", is a neighborhood in Lower Manhattan, New York City. Since the 1970s, the neighborhood has been the location of many artists' lofts and art galleries, art installations such as the Wall, and has also been known for its variety of shops ranging from trendy upscale boutiques to national and international chain store locations. The area's history is an archetypal example of inner-city regeneration and gentrification, with socioeconomic, cultural, political, and architectural developments.

The name "SoHo" derives from the area being "South of Houston Street", and was coined in 1962 by Chester Rapkin, an urban planner and author of The South Houston Industrial Area study, also known as the "Rapkin Report". (Note: The coining of "SoHo" for "South of Houston" began a naming convention that became a model for the names of emerging and re-purposed neighborhoods in New York such as TriBeCa for "Triangle Below Canal Street", DUMBO ("Down Under the Manhattan Bridge Overpass"), NoHo ("North of Houston Street"), NoLIta ("North of Little Italy") and NoMad ("North of Madison Square"), among others.) The name also recalls Soho, an area in London's West End.

Almost all of SoHo is included in the SoHo–Cast Iron Historic District, which was designated by the New York City Landmarks Preservation Commission in 1973, extended in 2010, and was listed on the National Register of Historic Places and declared a National Historic Landmark in 1978. It consists of 26 blocks and approximately 500 buildings, many of them incorporating cast-iron architectural elements. Many side streets in the district are paved with Belgian blocks.

SoHo is part of Manhattan Community District 2 and its primary ZIP Codes are 10012 and 10013. It is patrolled by the 1st and 5th Precincts of the New York City Police Department.

== Geography ==
=== Boundaries ===
Because of the nature of neighborhoods in New York City, (Note: Neighborhoods in New York City do not have official status, and their boundaries are not specifically set by the city, although the boundaries of related areas, such as zoning districts and historic districts are set and specific. Because of this, the definition of where neighborhoods begin and end is subject to a variety of forces, including the efforts of real estate concerns to promote certain areas, the use of neighborhood names in media news reports, and the everyday usage of people.) different sources will often give different boundaries for each one. In the case of SoHo, all sources appear to agree that the northern boundary is Houston Street, and the southern boundary is Canal Street, but the location of the eastern and western boundaries is disputed.

In 1974, shortly after SoHo first came into existence, The New York Times described the boundaries as "stretching from Houston to Canal Streets between West Broadway and Lafayette Street" – a definition it continued to hold to in 2016 – but The Encyclopedia of New York City reports that SoHo is bounded by Crosby Street on the east, and Sixth Avenue to the west. These are the same boundaries shown by Google Maps. However, the AIA Guide to New York City gives the western boundary of SoHo north of Broome Street as being West Broadway, and New York magazine gives the eastern boundary as Lafayette Street and the western boundary as the Hudson River.

The map at the Community Board 2 profile page on New York City's official website has "SOHO" written near Broadway in the space roughly equidistant between Houston Street and Canal Street.

In the 1990s, real estate agents began giving an adjacent neighborhood below West Houston Street various appellations, with no general agreement on whether it should be called (or included as part of) West SoHo, Hudson Square or the South Village. The AIA Guide calls that neighborhood "An intersection of brick and glass, searching for an identity", and refers to the western section of it as "The Glass Box District". Unlike Hudson Square, the South Village has traditionally appeared on maps of Community District 2, centered near the intersection of Houston Street and Avenue of the Americas. The more recent map of Community District 2 contains both the South Village and Hudson Square, with the latter written in the area below Houston Street, between Hudson Street and the Hudson River.

=== Historic District ===
The SoHo–Cast Iron Historic District is contained within the zoned SoHo neighborhood. Originally ending in the west at the eastern side of West Broadway and to the east at the western side of Crosby Street, the SoHo–Cast Iron Historic District was expanded in 2010 to cover most of West Broadway and to extend east to Lafayette and Centre Streets. The boundary lines are not straight, and some block-fronts on West Broadway and Lafayette are excluded from the District.

== History ==
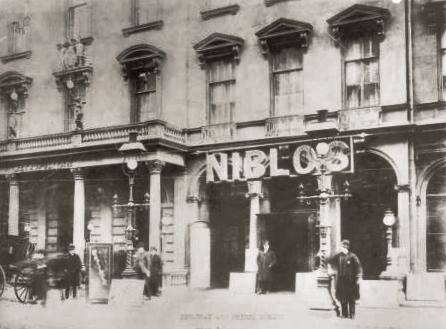
Niblo's Garden, seen here around 1887, was an entertainment venue on Broadway near Prince Street from 1823 to 1895.

=== Early years ===
During the colonial period, the land that is now SoHo was part of a grant of farmland given to freed slaves of the Dutch West Indies Company, and the site of the first free Black settlement on Manhattan island. This land was acquired in the 1660s by Augustine Hermann, and then passed to his brother-in-law, Nicholas Bayard. The estate was confiscated by the state as a result of Bayard's part in Leisler's Rebellion, but was returned to him after the sentence was annulled.

In the 18th century natural barriers – streams and hills – impeded the growth of the city northward into the Bayard estate, and the area maintained its rural character. During the American Revolution, the area was the location of numerous fortifications, redoubts and breastworks. After the war, Bayard, who had suffered financially because of it, was forced to mortgage some of the property, which was divided up into lots, but even then there was very little development in the area, aside from some manufacturing at Broadway and Canal Street.

Serious development of the area did not begin until the Common Council, answering the complaints of landowners in the area, drained the Collect Pond, which had once been an important source of fresh water for the island, but which had become polluted and rank and a breeding ground for mosquitoes. A canal was built to drain the pond into the Hudson, and the canal and pond were both later filled in using earth from nearby Bayard's Hill. Once Broadway was paved and sidewalks were built there and along Canal Street, more people began to make their homes there, joining earlier arrivals such as James Fenimore Cooper.

=== Commerce, entertainment, and decline ===
By the mid-19th century, the early Federal- and Greek Revival-style homes were replaced by more-solid structures of masonry and cast iron, and along Broadway, large marble-skinned commercial establishments began to open, such as Lord & Taylor, Arnold Constable & Company and Tiffany & Company, as well as grand hotels such as the St. Nicholas and the Metropolitan. Theatres followed in their wake, and Broadway between Canal and Houston Streets became a lively theater and shopping district and the entertainment center of New York; as usual with such areas, it was home to many brothels as well, and the side streets off of Broadway became the city's red-light district. As this change in character drove out the middle-class, their place was taken by small manufacturing concerns, including cabinet-makers and the lumberyards that supplied them, brass and copper firms, makers of china and glassware, locksmiths, snuff manufacturers and book publishers.

This dramatic shift in the nature of the neighborhood continued to drive out residents, and between 1860 and 1865 the Eighth Ward, which included the SoHo area, lost 25% of its population. After the Civil War and the Panic of 1873, in the 1880s and 1890s, large manufacturers began to move into the area, especially textile firms, and the area became the mercantile and wholesale dry-goods trade center of the city, and was the subject of significant real-estate speculation. This phase came to an end by the close of the 19th century, and as the center of the city continued to move uptown, the quality of the area declined.

After World War II, the textile industry largely moved to the South, leaving many large buildings in the district unoccupied. In some buildings they were replaced by warehouses and printing plants, and other buildings were torn down to be replaced by gas stations, auto repair shops and parking lots and garages. By the 1950s, the area had become known as Hell's Hundred Acres, an industrial wasteland, full of sweatshops and small factories in the daytime, but empty at night. It would not be until the 1960s, when artists began to be interested in the tall ceilings and many windows of the empty manufacturing lofts, that the character of the neighborhood began to change again.

=== Cast-iron architecture ===
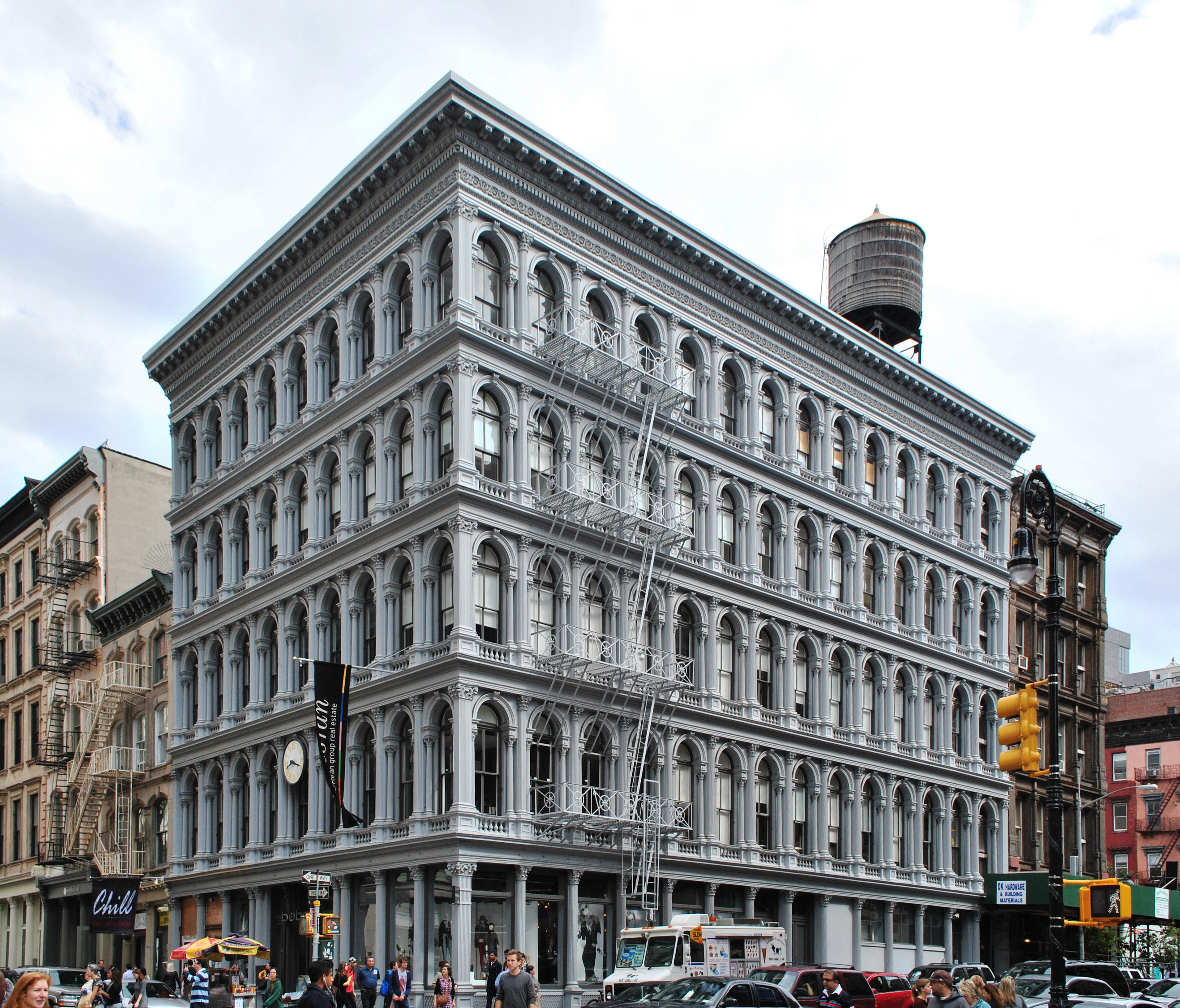
The E. V. Haughwout Building at Broadway and Broome Street was built in 1856–57, and has a cast-iron facade by Daniel D. Badger.

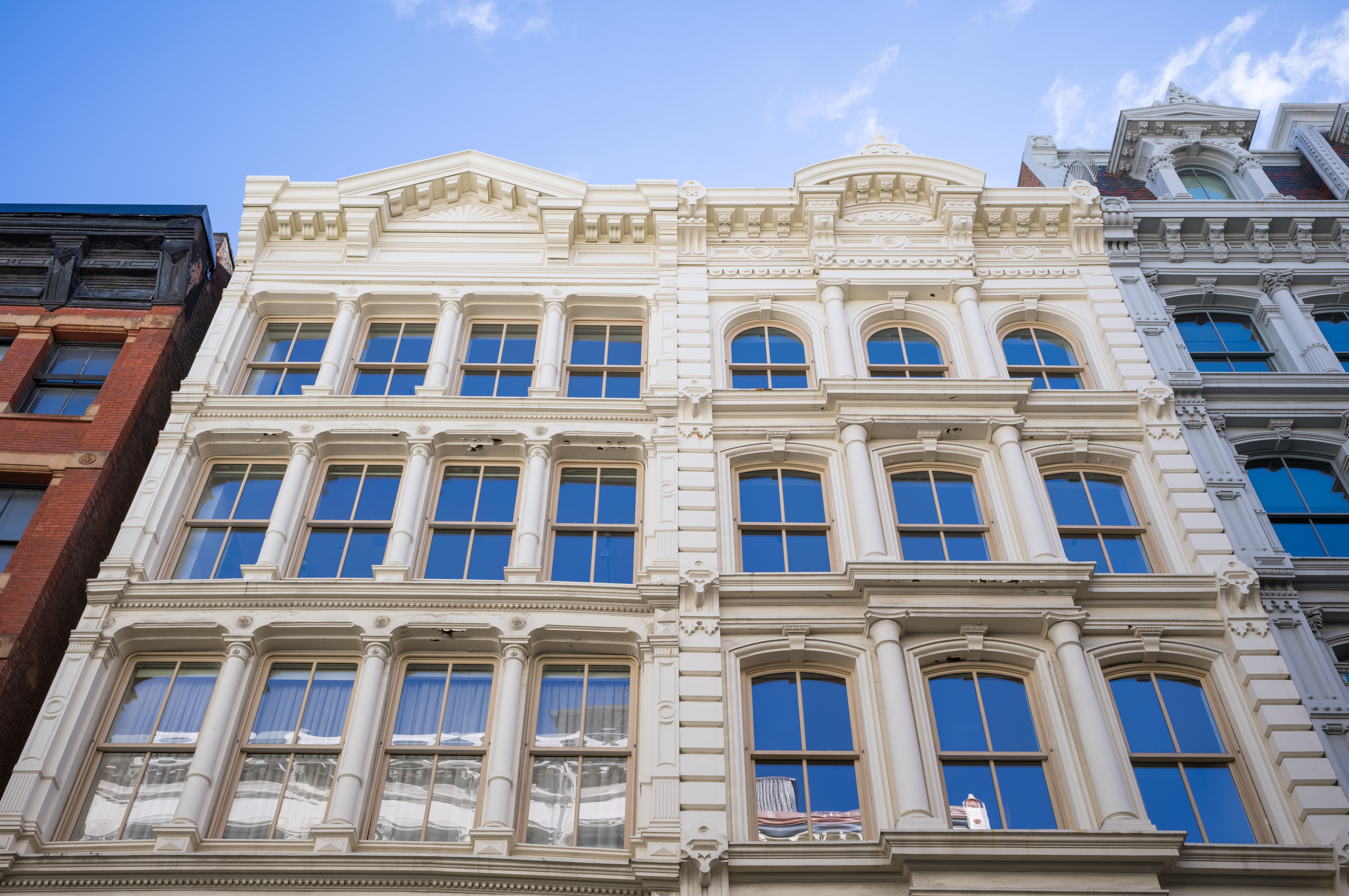
Cast iron facade in Second Empire style of 28 Greene St. The building, known as "The Queen of Greene Street", was built in 1873 to the design of architect Isaac F. Duckworth.

SoHo boasts the greatest collection of cast-iron architecture in the world. Approximately 250 cast-iron buildings stand in New York City, and the majority are in SoHo. Cast iron was initially used as a decorative front over a pre-existing building. With the addition of modern, decorative facades, older industrial buildings were able to attract new commercial clients. Most of these facades were constructed during the period from 1840 to 1880. In addition to revitalizing older structures, buildings in SoHo were later designed to feature the cast iron.

An American architectural innovation, cast iron was cheaper to use for facades than materials such as stone or brick. Molds of ornamentation, prefabricated in foundries, were used interchangeably for many buildings, and a broken piece could be easily recast. The buildings could be erected quickly; some were built in four months. Despite the brief construction period, the quality of the cast-iron designs was not sacrificed. Bronze had previously been the metal most frequently used for architectural detail. Architects found that the relatively inexpensive cast iron could provide intricately designed patterns. Classical French and Italian architectural designs were often used as models for these facades. Because stone was the material associated with architectural masterpieces, cast iron, painted in neutral tints such as beige, was used to simulate stone.

There was a profusion of cast iron foundries in New York, including Badger's Architectural Iron Works, James L. Jackson's Iron Works, and Cornell Iron Works.

Since the iron was pliable and easily molded, sumptuously curved window frames were created, and the strength of the metal allowed these frames considerable height. The once-somber, gas-lit interiors of the industrial district were flooded with sunlight through the enlarged windows. The strength of cast iron permitted high ceilings with sleek supporting columns, and interiors became expansive and functional.

During cast iron's heyday, many architects thought it to be structurally more sound than steel. It was also thought that cast iron would be fire-resistant, and facades were constructed over many interiors built of wood and other flammable materials. When exposed to heat, cast iron buckled, and later cracked under the cold water used to extinguish fire. In 1899, a building code mandating the backing of cast-iron fronts with masonry was passed. Most of the buildings that stand today are constructed in this way. It was the advent of steel as a major construction material that brought an end to the cast iron era.

=== Lower Manhattan Expressway ===
In the 1960s, the SoHo area was to have been the location of two enormous elevated highways, branches of the Lower Manhattan Expressway, a Robert Moses project that was intended to create an automobile and truck through-route connecting the Manhattan Bridge and Williamsburg Bridge on the east with the Holland Tunnel on the west.

The young historic preservation movement and architectural critics, stung by the destruction of the original Pennsylvania Station in 1963 and the threat to other historic structures, challenged the plans because of the threatened loss of a huge quantity of 19th-century cast-iron buildings.

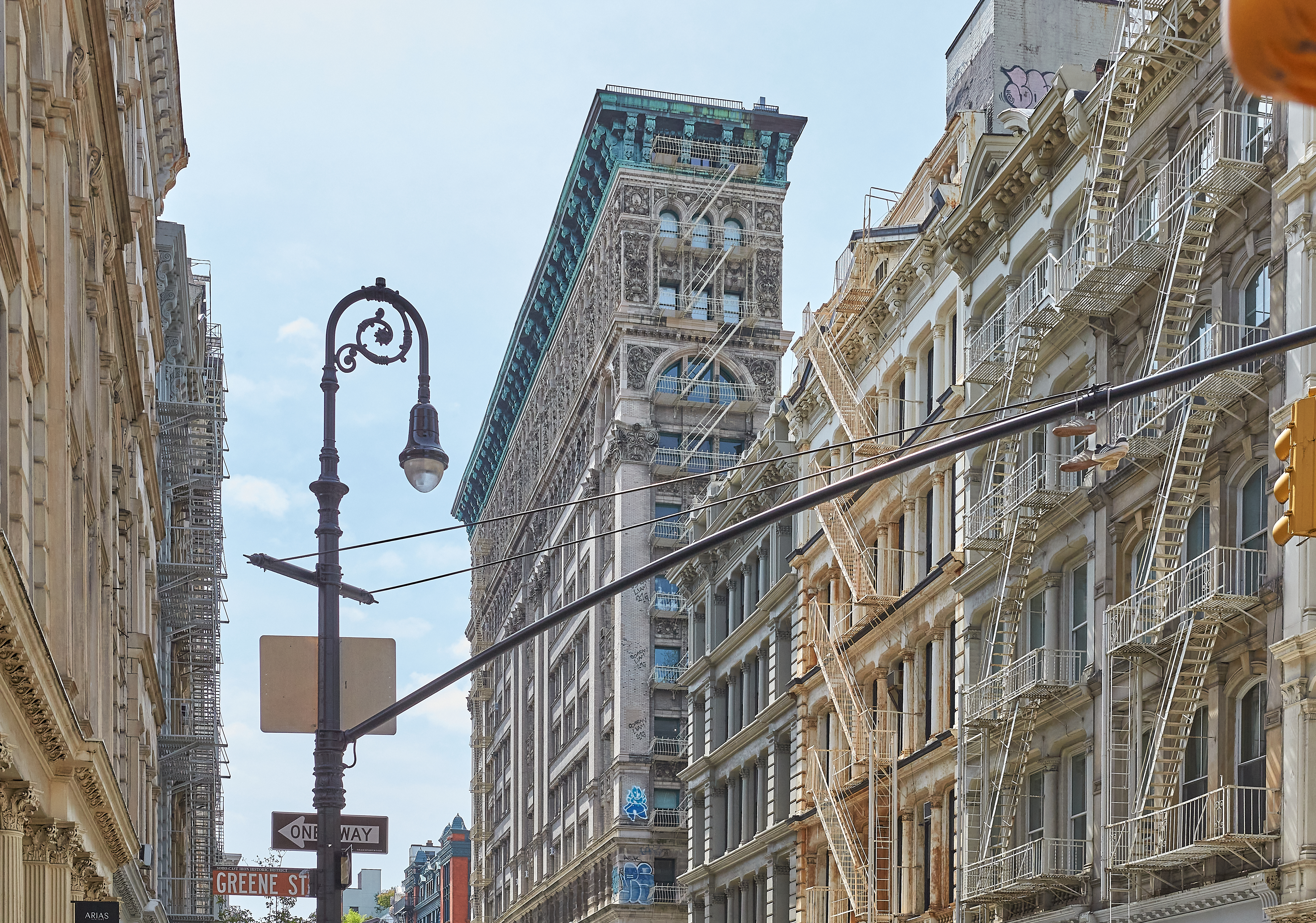
Cast-iron architecture on Broome Street

When John V. Lindsay became mayor of New York City in 1966, his initial reaction was to try to push the expressways through, dubbing the project the Lower Manhattan Expressway, depressing some of the proposed highway in residential areas and stressing the importance of the artery to the city. Nevertheless, through the efforts of Jane Jacobs, Tony D'Apolito, Margot Gayle, and other local, civic, and cultural leaders, as well as SoHo artist residents themselves, the project was derailed.

=== Artists move in ===
After the abandonment of the highway scheme, the city was left with a large number of historic buildings that were unattractive for the kinds of manufacturing and commerce that survived in the city in the 1970s. The upper floors of many of these buildings had been built as commercial Manhattan lofts, which provided large, unobstructed spaces for manufacturing and other industrial uses. These spaces attracted artists who valued them for their large areas, large windows admitting natural light and low rents. Most of these spaces were also used illegally as living space, despite being neither zoned nor equipped for residential use. This widespread zoning violation was ignored for a long period of time, as the artist-occupants were using space for which there was little demand due to the city's poor economy at the time, and would have lain dormant or been abandoned otherwise.

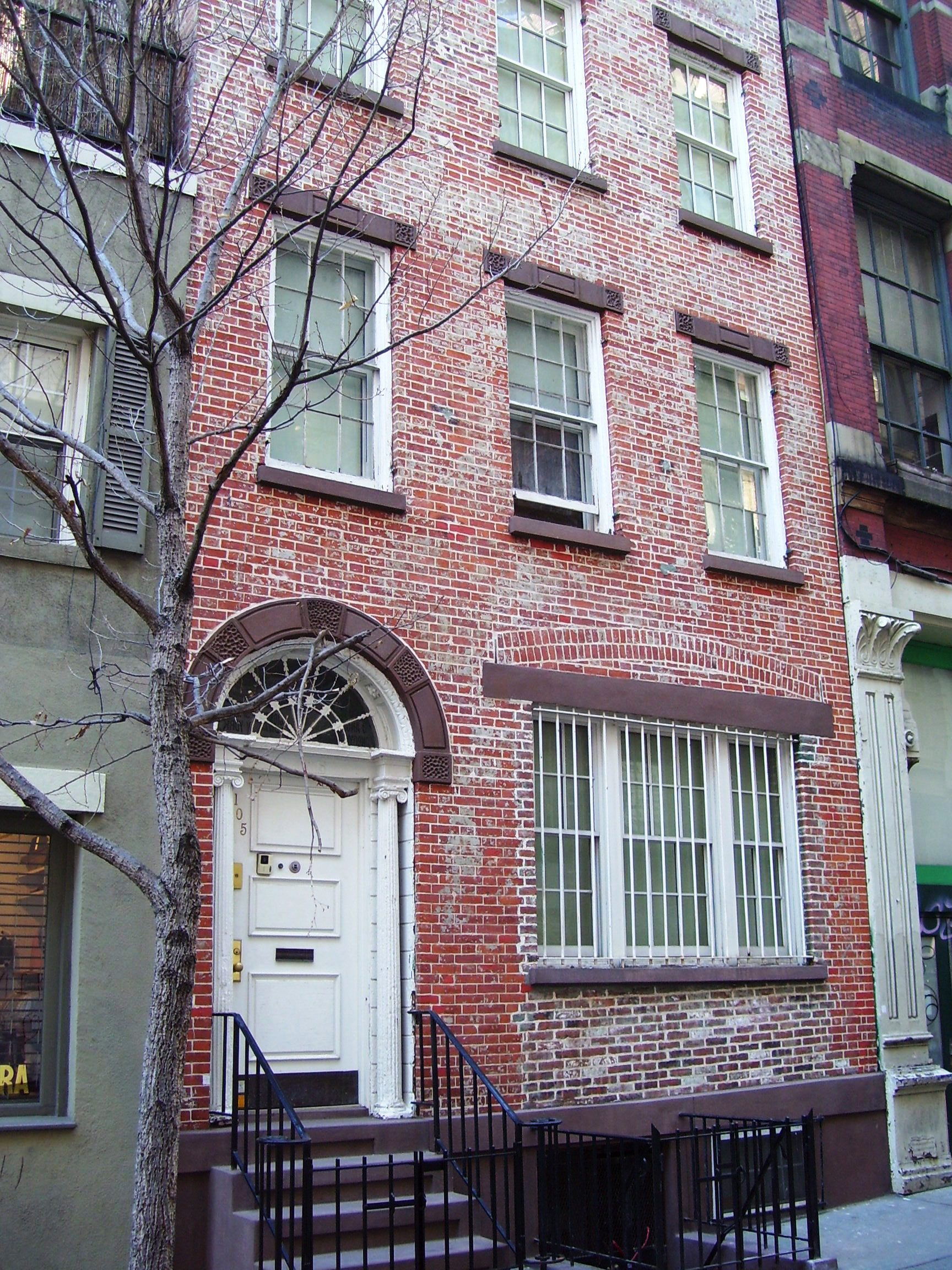
SoHo also contains former industrial buildings in other architectural styles, and is dotted with smaller structures like this Federal style house built in 1819–20.

Nevertheless, as the artist population grew, the city made some attempts to stem the movement, concerned about the occupation of space that did not meet residential building codes, and the possibility that the occupied space might be needed for the return of manufacturing to New York City. Pressured on many sides, including by organizations such as the Artist Tenant Association and later the Soho Artist Association, the city abandoned attempts to keep the district as strictly industrial space, and in 1971, the Zoning Resolution was amended to permit Joint Live–Work Quarters for artists, and the M1-5a and M-5b districting was established to permit visual artists to live where they worked, as long as they were certified as such by the Department of Cultural Affairs; new lofts for artists had to be smaller than 3,600 square feet (330 m^{2}), while those residing and working in larger lofts before September 1970 were permitted to remain. In 1987, non-artists residing in SoHo and NoHo were permitted to grandfather themselves, but that was the only extension to non-artists and was a one-time agreement.

The area received landmark designation as the SoHo–Cast Iron Historic District in 1973.

=== Gentrification and shopping ===
Beginning in the 1980s, in a way that would later apply elsewhere, the neighborhood began to draw more affluent residents. The 1982 Loft Law legalized what had been happening already and afforded rent protection and stability to the artists who had taken root in the neighborhood. The Loft Law protections combined with the fact that many of the artists owned their co-ops, led many of the original pioneering artists to remain, despite the popular misconception that gentrification forced them to flee. In the mid-1990s, many galleries moved to Chelsea, but several galleries remain as of 2013, including DTR Modern Galleries, William Bennett Gallery, Martin Lawrence Galleries, Terrain Gallery, Franklin Bowles Gallery, and Pop International Gallery. In 2005, the construction of residential buildings on empty lots in the historic district was permitted.

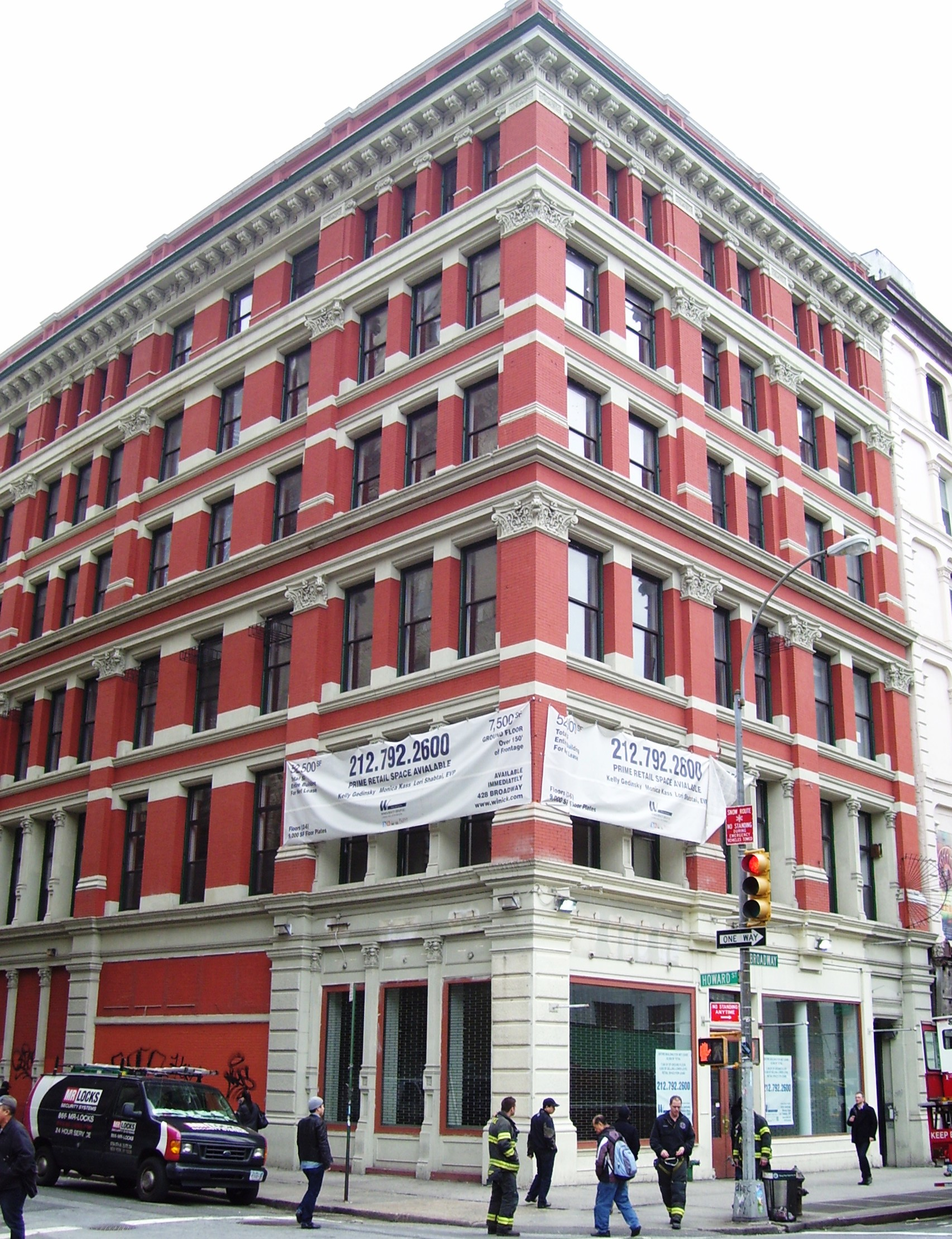
428 Broadway (428–432) was built in 1888–89 and was designed by Samuel A. Warner in the Queen Anne style.

SoHo's location, the appeal of lofts as living spaces, its architecture, and its reputation as a haven for artists all contributed to this change. The pattern of gentrification is typically known as the "SoHo Effect" and has been observed elsewhere in the United States. A backwater of poor artists and small factories in the 1970s, SoHo became a popular tourist destination for people seeking fashionable clothing and exquisite architecture, and home to some of the most expensive real estate in the country.

SoHo's chain outlets are clustered in the northern area of the neighborhood, along Broadway and Prince and Spring Streets. The sidewalks in this area are often crowded with tourists and with vendors selling jewelry, T-shirts, and other works. SoHo is known for its commercialization and eclectic mix of boutiques for shopping – although in 2010, it had twice as many chain stores as boutiques and three times as many boutiques as art galleries.

=== Rezoning ===
Despite the significant change in the neighborhood's character in the previous decades, by the end of the 2010s the area's zoning still reflected its industrial heritage; any new residential development required special permits. As such, in 2019 the city began a public consultation process called "Envision SoHo/NoHo" to plan for future growth and manage change, and ultimately to bring land use rules in line with the mainly residential and commercial present-day reality of the neighborhood.

A coalition of nearly two dozen housing and social organizations, led by pro-housing advocacy group Open New York, and including the Citizens Housing and Planning Council, the Regional Plan Association, and Habitat for Humanity, seized on the idea of a rezoning as a means of alleviating the city's housing shortage. In October 2019, the coalition put forward a rezoning plan that would produce 3,400 additional housing units, nearly 700 of which would be affordable, and later that month the city officially proposed a similar plan that envisaged the creation of 3,200 new residential units and up to 800 affordable units. Observers suggested that the coalition's campaign for a residential rezoning had spurred a previously reluctant mayor to act, noting that even real estate industry groups like the Real Estate Board of New York (REBNY), the city's largest real estate trade organization, had shown no interest in a rezoning of SoHo and NoHo. The proposal was immediately contentious; while most major candidates in the Democratic mayoral and Manhattan borough president primaries endorsed the plan, at least in principle, candidates for the city council district were more divided.

A group of a half-dozen neighborhood groups, led by the Greenwich Village Society for Historic Preservation, put forth a "community alternative plan" which they claimed would create more affordable housing without any major new development, and a report attacking the city's plan, a claim that was challenged by the city and other civic organizations. Carl Weisbrod, former chairman of the New York City Planning Commission said the GVSHP's report was "misleading and disingenuous", and a spokesman for the mayor's office described the "community alternative plan" as "an exercise in magical thinking". In July 2021, the area's community board voted to reject the proposal, although the vote was ultimately non-binding. In September 2021, Manhattan Borough president Gale Brewer expressed concerns about the plan, particularly the potential for the plan to incentivize commercial development rather than residential, a criticism echoed by some of the housing advocates who had initially pushed for the plan.

In 2022, a team of over 2,000 players constructed a recreation of Soho in the sandbox game Minecraft, as part of the COVID-19 Build the Earth movement.

== Demographics ==
For census purposes, the New York City government classifies SoHo as part of a larger neighborhood tabulation area called SoHo-Little Italy-Hudson Square. Based on data from the 2020 United States Census, the population of SoHo-Little Italy-Hudson Square was 23,278, which is difficult to compare to previous years because of changes in the boundaries of neighborhood tabulation areas. Covering an area of 296.5 acres (120.0 ha), the neighborhood had a population density of 78.4 inhabitants per acre (50,200/sq mi; 19,400/km^{2}). The racial makeup of the neighborhood was 58.6% (13,642) White, 2.1% (499) African American, 25.2% (5,860) Asian, 1.0% (236) from other races, and 4.4% (1,018) from two or more races. Hispanic or Latino of any race were 8.7% (2,032) of the population.

The entirety of Community District 2, which comprises SoHo and Greenwich Village, had 91,638 inhabitants as of NYC Health's 2018 Community Health Profile, with an average life expectancy of 85.8 years. This is higher than the median life expectancy of 81.2 for all New York City neighborhoods. Most inhabitants are adults: a plurality (42%) are between the ages of 25 and 44, while 24% are between 45 and 64, and 15% are 65 or older. The ratio of youth and college-aged residents was lower, at 9% and 10% respectively.

As of 2017, the median household income in Community Districts 1 and 2 (including the Financial District and Tribeca) was $144,878, though the median income in SoHo individually was $124,396. In 2018, an estimated 9% of SoHo and Greenwich Village residents lived in poverty, compared to 20% in all of Manhattan and 20% in all of New York City. One in twenty-five residents (4%) were unemployed, compared to 7% in Manhattan and 9% in New York City. Rent burden, or the percentage of residents who have difficulty paying their rent, is 38% in SoHo and Greenwich Village, compared to the boroughwide and citywide rates of 45% and 51% respectively. Based on this calculation, as of 2018, SoHo and Greenwich Village are considered high-income relative to the rest of the city and not gentrifying.

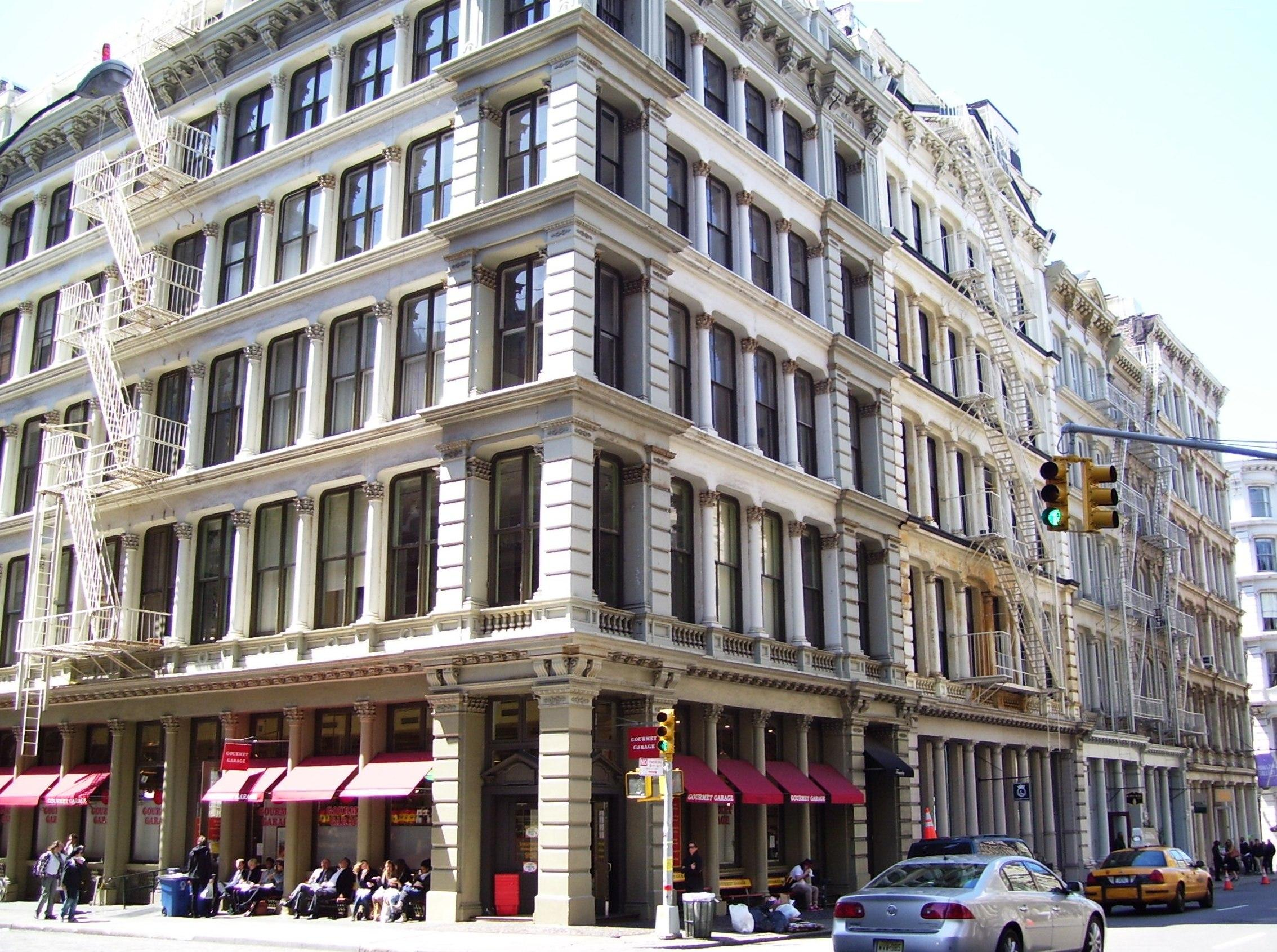
Cast-iron buildings at 453–467 Broome Street between Mercer and Greene Streets

== Police and crime ==
SoHo and Lower Manhattan are patrolled by the 1st Precinct of the NYPD, at 16 Ericsson Place. The 1st Precinct ranked 63rd safest out of 69 city precincts for per-capita crime in 2010. Though the number of crimes is low compared to other NYPD precincts, the residential population is also much lower. With a non-fatal assault rate of 10 per 100,000 people, SoHo's rate of violent crimes per capita is less than that of the city as a whole. The incarceration rate of 100 per 100,000 people is also lower than that of the city as a whole.

The 1st Precinct has a lower crime rate than in the 1990s, with crimes across all categories having decreased by 86.3% between 1990 and 2018. The precinct saw 1 murder, 23 rapes, 80 robberies, 61 felony assaults, 85 burglaries, 1,085 grand larcenies, and 21 grand larcenies auto in 2018.

== Fire safety ==
SoHo is served by two New York City Fire Department (FDNY) fire stations:

- Engine Co. 24/Ladder Company 5/Battalion 2 – 227 6th Avenue
- Ladder Company 20/Division 1 – 253 Lafayette Street

== Health ==
Preterm births are more common in SoHo and Greenwich Village than in other places citywide, though teenage births are less common. In SoHo and Greenwich Village, there were 91 preterm births per 1,000 live births (compared to 87 per 1,000 citywide), and 1 teenage birth per 1,000 live births (compared to 19.3 per 1,000 citywide), though the teenage birth rate is based on a small sample size. SoHo and Greenwich Village have a low population of residents who are uninsured. In 2018, this population of uninsured residents was estimated to be 4%, less than the citywide rate of 12%, though this was based on a small sample size.

The concentration of fine particulate matter, the deadliest type of air pollutant, in SoHo and Greenwich Village is 0.0095 milligrams per cubic metre (9.5×10^{−9} oz/ft^{3}), more than the city average. Sixteen percent of SoHo and Greenwich Village residents are smokers, which is more than the city average of 14% of residents being smokers. In SoHo and Greenwich Village, 4% of residents are obese, 3% are diabetic, and 15% have high blood pressure, the lowest rates in the city – compared to the citywide averages of 24%, 11%, and 28% respectively. In addition, 5% of children are obese, the lowest rate in the city, compared to the citywide average of 20%.

Ninety-six percent of residents eat some fruits and vegetables every day, which is more than the city's average of 87%. In 2018, 91% of residents described their health as "good", "very good", or "excellent", more than the city's average of 78%. For every supermarket in SoHo and Greenwich Village, there are 7 bodegas.

The nearest major hospitals are the Bellevue Hospital Center and NYU Langone Medical Center in Kips Bay, and NewYork-Presbyterian Lower Manhattan Hospital in the Civic Center area. In addition, Beth Israel Medical Center in Stuyvesant Town operated until 2025.

== Post offices and ZIP Codes ==
SoHo is within two primary ZIP Codes. The area north of Broome Street is in 10012 while the area south of Broome Street is in 10013. The United States Postal Service operates two post offices near SoHo both in ZIP 10014:

- Village Station – 201 Varick Street at King Street.
- West Village Station – 527 Hudson Street between West 10th and Charles streets.

== Education ==
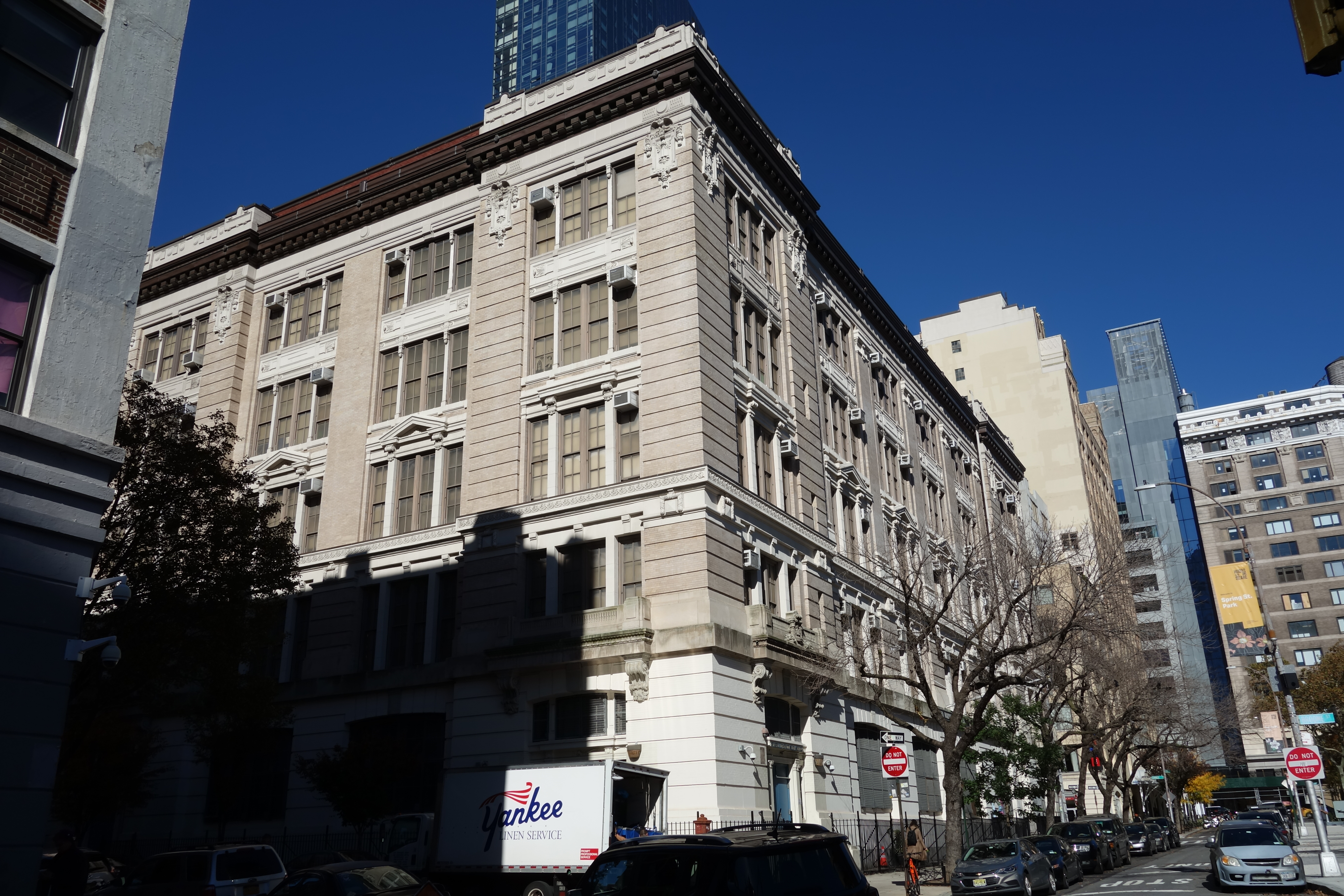
Chelsea Career & Technical Education High School, located just outside SoHo

SoHo and Greenwich Village generally have a higher rate of college-educated residents than the rest of the city. The vast majority of residents age 25 and older (84%) have a college education or higher, while 4% have less than a high school education and 12% are high school graduates or have some college education. By contrast, 64% of Manhattan residents and 43% of city residents have a college education or higher. The percentage of SoHo and Greenwich Village students excelling in math rose from 61% in 2000 to 80% in 2011, and reading achievement increased from 66% to 68% during the same time period.

SoHo and Greenwich Village's rate of elementary school student absenteeism is lower than the rest of New York City. In SoHo and Greenwich Village, 7% of elementary school students missed twenty or more days per school year, less than the citywide average of 20%. Additionally, 91% of high school students in SoHo and Greenwich Village graduate on time, more than the citywide average of 75%.

=== Schools ===
There are no New York City Department of Education schools in SoHo, although there are several just outside its borders, including:

- Broome Street Academy Charter School (M522, 121 Avenue of the Americas)
- Chelsea Career & Technical Education High School (M615, 131 Avenue of the Americas)
- NYC Ischool (M376, 131 Avenue of the Americas)
- P.S. 130 Hernando de Soto School (M130, 143 Baxter Street)
- Unity Center for Urban Technologies (M500, 121 Avenue of the Americas)
- The Montessori School in SoHo is at 75 Sullivan Street.

=== Library ===
The New York Public Library's Mulberry Street branch is located at 10 Jersey Street, where it occupies three floors of a former SoHo chocolate factory, including two basement levels.

== Transportation ==
=== Vehicles ===
By vehicle, SoHo borders the Holland Tunnel, which carries vehicular traffic under the Hudson River, connecting SoHo and Lower Manhattan with Jersey City and New Jersey to its west.

=== Subway ===
SoHo can be reached by the New York City Subway, using the A, C, and E trains to Spring Street; 1 and 2 trains to Houston Street; the N, Q, R, and W trains to Prince Street; and the 4, 6, and <6> trains to Spring Street. The crosstown M21 on Houston Street and the north–south M1, M55 bus routes also serve the neighborhood.

== See also ==
- Leslie Lohman Gay Art Foundation
- Soho Grand Hotel
- Vesuvio Playground
- SoHo Memory Project
