= Details (magazine) =

American monthly men's fashion magazine

- Cover of April 2009 issue
- Editor-in-Chief: Dan Peres
- Categories: Fashion, lifestyle, politics
- Frequency: Monthly
- Publisher: Condé Nast
- Total circulation: 456,666 (December 2012)
- Founded: 1982
- Final issue: December 2015
- Company: Advance Publications
- Country: United States
- Based in: New York City, U.S.
- Language: English
- ISSN: 0740-4921

Details (stylized in all caps) was an American monthly men's fashion magazine that was published by Condé Nast, originally founded in 1982 by Annie Flanders as an independent downtown culture magazine. Though devoted to fashion and lifestyle, Details also featured reports on relevant social and political issues. In November 2015 Condé Nast announced that the magazine would cease publication with the issue of December 2015/January 2016.

== History ==
In 1982, Details was launched, as a downtown culture magazine, by Annie Flanders, a former fashion editor, at a meeting of former employees of the newly defunct SoHo Weekly News, including Ronnie Cooke, Stephen Saban, Lesley Vinson, Megan Haungs and Bill Cunningham.

The Los Angeles Times detailed how the magazine changed hands a number of times in the years thereafter:

"In 1984, to save the publication from bankruptcy, Flanders sold a controlling interest for $300,000 to a British publisher. He in turn unloaded it in mid-1987 on a New York entrepreneur."

Alan Patricof bought the magazine in 1988. Condé Nast bought the magazine a year later for $2 million.

In 1988, Anna Wintour hired James Truman as features editor of American Vogue. By 1990, S. I. Newhouse Jr. moved Truman to editor of Details.

In 1990, Flanders left the magazine (June 1982 to November 1989). From 1990 to 1999, a sex column by Anka Radakovich ran in the magazine.

In October 2000, its redesigned format stemmed from a relaunch following the transfer of the magazine from Condé Nast to sibling division Fairchild Publications. Between its last issue at Condé Nast and first at Fairchild, publication of Details was temporarily suspended. This allowed for extensive redesign and strategic repositioning of the magazine.

== Music Matters CDs ==
From 1991 to 1999 the magazine produced sampler CDs that were sent out to current subscribers free of charge. While the CDs concentrated on then-current music, older songs were included as well. The initial CD was produced by Andrea Norlander of MTV, who oversaw concept, musical content, design, and marketing of the project.

- 1991: Music Matters [Summer 1991]
- 1991: Music Matters [Holiday 1991]
- 1992: Music Matters Volume 3
- 1992: Music Matters Volume 4
- 1993: Music Matters Volume 5 (There were one and two CD versions of this volume.)
- 1994: Music Matters Volume 6
- 1995: Music Matters Volume 7
- 1996: Music Matters Volume 8
- 1997: Music Matters Volume 9
- 1998: Music Matters Volume 10
- 1999: Details 2000 Tomorrow's Music Today!

== Comics journalism ==
Cartoonist Art Spiegelman was comics editor of Details in the mid-1990s; in 1997, he began assigning comics journalism pieces to a number of his cartoonist associates. The magazine published these works of journalism in comics form throughout 1998 and 1999, helping to legitimize the form in popular perception.

- "Burning Man" (Nov. 1997), pp. 172–175 — Peter Kuper
- "Pray for Surf" (May 1998), pp. 150–153 — Ben Katchor on sports
- "So Much Comedy, So Little Time," (July 1998), pp. 148–151 — Peter Bagge
- "Clothes Encounters" (August 1998), pp. 128–133 — Charles Burns illustrating a fashion show
- "The War Crimes Trials (September 1998), pp. 260-265 — Joe Sacco on the aftermath of the Bosnian War
- "Ozziefest [sic] '98" (October 1998), pp. 184–187 — Kaz on Ozzy Osbourne
- "Ready to Die" (May 1999), pp. 146–151 — Kim Deitch
- "Smash Violence!" (September 1999), pp. 202–203 — Jay Lynch parodying censorship of the media
- "Chasing Melissas!" (October 1999), pp. 192–197 — Kim Deitch on the link between computer viruses and pornography
- "The Rude Blues" (April 2000), pp. 140–145 — Joe Sacco

== Controversy ==
In 2004, Details published a piece by Whitney McNally titled "Gay or Asian?", which featured a photo of an East Asian model and "tips" on how to tell the difference. Some of the text that accompanied the photo: "One cruises for chicken; the other takes it General Tso-style. Whether you're into shrimp balls or shaved balls, entering the dragon requires imperial tastes." The article generated protests over its racism and homophobia, and over its erasure of gay Asian men. To protest, LGBT Asian American individuals and groups came together and held demonstrations.

== Staff contributors ==
Frequent contributors included Augusten Burroughs, Blake Nelson, Michael Chabon, and Bill Cunningham. Other contributors included Beauregard Houston-Montgomery. Former staffers included Pete Wells, Ian Daly, Kayleen Schaefer, Erica Cerulo, Andrew Essex, Yaran Noti, Jeff Gordinier, Karl Taro Greenfeld, and Alex Bhattacharji.

Its editor-in-chief, for 15 years, from 2000 was Dan Peres, the former husband of Australian actress Sarah Wynter.
