= Eisner Award for Best Reality-Based Work =

Award for non-fictional US comics

- Awarded for: Best Reality-Based Work
- Country: United States
- First award: 2006
- Most recent winner: Black Arms to Hold You Up: A History of Black Resistance, by Ben Passmore
- Website: www.comic-con.org/awards/eisner-awards-current-info

The Eisner Award for Best Reality-Based Work is an award for "creative achievement" in non-fiction American comic books.

== Winners and nominees ==
Year	Title	Authors	Ref.
2000s
2006	Nat Turner (Kyle Baker Publishing)	Kyle Baker	
2006	Embroideries (Pantheon Books)	Marjane Satrapi	
2006	Epileptic (Pantheon Books)	David B.	
2006	Pyongyang: A Journey in North Korea (Drawn & Quarterly)	Guy Delisle	
2006	True Story, Swear to God (Clib's Boy Comics) and True Story, Swear to God: This One Goes to Eleven (AiT/Planet Lar)	Tom Beland	
2007	Fun Home (Houghton Mifflin)	Alison Bechdel	
2007	I Love Led Zeppelin (Fantagraphics)	Ellen Forney	
2007	Mom's Cancer (Abrams Books)	Brian Fies	
2007	Project X: Cup Noodle (Digital Manga, ISBN 9781569709597)	Tadashi Katoh (author) and Akira Imai (artist)	
2007	Stagger Lee (Image Comics)	Derek McCulloch and Shepherd Hendrix	
2008	Satchel Paige: Striking Out Jim Crow (Center for Cartoon Studies/Hyperion Books for Children)	James Sturm and Rich Tommaso	
2008	Laika (First Second Books)	Nick Abadzis	
2008	The Magical Life of Long Tack Sam (Riverhead Books/Penguin Group)	Ann Marie Fleming	
2008	Sentences: The Life of MF Grimm (Vertigo Comics/DC Comics)	Percy Carey and Ronald Wimberly	
2008	White Rapids (Drawn & Quarterly)	Pascal Blanchet	
2009	What It Is (Drawn & Quarterly)	Lynda Barry	
2009	Alan's War (First Second Books)	Emmanuel Guibert	
2009	Blue Pills: A Positive Love Story (Houghton Mifflin)	Frederik Peeters	
2009	Fishtown (IDW Publishing)	Kevin Colden	
2009	A Treasury of XXth Century Murder: The Lindbergh Child (NBM Publishing)	Rick Geary	
2010s
2010	A Drifting Life (Drawn & Quarterly)	Yoshihiro Tatsumi	
2010	Footnotes in Gaza (Metropolitan Books/Henry Holt and Company)	Joe Sacco	
2010	The Impostor's Daughter: A True Memoir (Little, Brown)	Laurie Sandell	
2010	Monsters (Secret Acres)	Ken Dahl	
2010	The Photographer (First Second Books)	Emmanuel Guibert, Didier Lefèvre, and Frédéric Lemercier	
2010	Stitches (W. W. Norton & Company)	David Small	
2011	It Was the War of the Trenches (Fantagraphics)	Jacques Tardi	
2011	Picture This: The Nearsighted Monkey Book (Drawn & Quarterly)	Lynda Barry	
2011	Special Exits: A Graphic Memoir (Fantagraphics)	Joyce Farmer	
2011	Treasury of XXth Century Murder: The Terrible Axe Man of New Orleans (NBM Publishing)	Rick Geary	
2011	Two Generals (McClelland & Stewart)	Scott Chantler	
2011	You'll Never Know Book 2: Collateral Damage (Fantagraphics)	Carol Tyler	
2012	Green River Killer: A True Detective Story (Dark Horse Comics)	Jeff Jensen and Jonathan Case	
2012	Around the World (Candlewick Press)	Matt Phelan	
2012	Marzi: A Memoir (Vertigo Comics/DC Comics)	Marzena Sowa and Sylvain Savoia	
2012	Onward Towards Our Noble Deaths (Drawn & Quarterly)	Shigeru Mizuki	
2012	Vietnamerica (Villard)	GB Tran	
2013	Annie Sullivan and the Trials of Helen Keller (Center for Cartoon Studies/Hyperion Books for Children) (Note: There was a tie between Annie Sullivan and the Trials of Helen Keller and The Carter Family: Don't Forget This Song.)	Joseph Lambert	
2013	The Carter Family: Don't Forget This Song (Abrams ComicArts)	Frank M. Young and David Lasky	
2013	A Chinese Life (SelfMadeHero)	Li Kunwu and Philippe Ôtié, translated by Edward Gauvin	
2013	The Infinite Wait and Other Stories (Koyama Press)	Julia Wertz	
2013	Marbles: Mania Depression Michelangelo & Me (Gotham Books)	Ellen Forney	
2013	You'll Never Know Book 3: A Soldier's Heart (Fantagraphics)	Carol Tyler	
2014	The Fifth Beatle: The Brian Epstein Story (M Press/Dark Horse Comics)	Vivek J. Tiwary, Andrew C. Robinson, and Kyle Baker	
2014	A Bag of Marbles (Graphic Universe/Lerner Publishing Group)	Joseph Joffo, Kris, and Vincent Bailly	
2014	Hip Hop Family Tree, Book 1: 1970s-1981 (Fantagraphics)	Ed Piskor	
2014	March: Book One (Top Shelf Productions)	John Lewis, Andrew Aydin, and Nate Powell	
2014	Today Is the Last Day of the Rest of Your Life (Fantagraphics)	Ulli Lust	
2014	Woman Rebel: The Margaret Sanger Story (Drawn & Quarterly)	Peter Bagge	
2015	Hip Hop Family Tree, Book 2: 1981-1983 (Fantagraphics)	Ed Piskor	
2015	Can't We Talk About Something More Pleasant? (Bloomsbury Publishing)	Roz Chast	
2015	Dragon’s Breath and Other True Stories (2d Cloud/Uncivilized Books)	MariNaomi	
2015	El Deafo (Amulet Books/Abrams Books)	Cece Bell	
2015	Nathan Hale’s Hazardous Tales: Treaties Trenches Mud and Blood (Abrams Books)	Nathan Hale	
2015	To End All Wars: The Graphic Anthology of The First World War (Soaring Penguin Press)	edited by Jonathan Clode and John Stuart Clark	
2016	March: Book Two (Top Shelf Productions/IDW Publishing)	John Lewis, Andrew Aydin, and Nate Powell	
2016	The Arab of the Future: A Childhood in the Middle East 1978–1984 (Metropolitan Books)	Riad Sattouf	
2016	Displacement: A Travelogue (Fantagraphics)	Lucy Knisley	
2016	Hip Hop Family Tree Book 3: 1983–1984 (Fantagraphics)	Ed Piskor	
2016	Invisible Ink: My Mother’s Secret Love Affair with a Famous Cartoonist (Fantagraphics)	Bill Griffith	
2016	The Story of My Tits (Top Shelf Productions/IDW Publishing)	Jennifer Hayden	
2017	March: Book Three (Top Shelf Productions)	John Lewis, Andrew Aydin, and Nate Powell	
2017	Dark Night: A True Batman Story (Vertigo Comics/DC Comics)	Paul Dini and Eduardo Risso	
2017	Glenn Gould: A Life Off Tempo (NBM Publishing)	Sandrine Revel	
2017	Rosalie Lightning: A Graphic Memoir (St. Martin's Press)	Tom Hart	
2017	Tetris: The Games People Play (First Second Books)	Box Brown	
2018	Spinning (First Second Books)	Tillie Walden	
2018	Audubon: On the Wings of the World (Nobrow Press)	Fabien Grolleau and Jerémie Royer, translated by Etienne Gilfillan	
2018	The Best We Could Do (Abrams ComicArts)	Thi Bui	
2018	Calamity Jane: The Calamitous Life of Martha Jane Cannary 1852–1903 (IDW Publishing)	Christian Perrissin and Matthieu Blanchin, translated by Diana Schutz and Brandon Kander	
2018	Lennon: The New York Years (IDW Publishing)	David Foenkinos, Éric Corbeyran, and Horne Perreard, translated by Ivanka Hahnenberger	
2019	Is This Guy For Real? The Unbelievable Andy Kaufman (First Second Books)	Box Brown	
2019	All the Answers: A Graphic Memoir (Gallery 13)	Michael Kupperman	
2019	All the Sad Songs (Retrofit Comics/Big Planet Comics)	Summer Pierre	
2019	Monk! (First Second Books)	Youssef Daoudi	
2019	One Dirty Tree (Uncivilized Books)	Noah Van Sciver	
2020s
2020	They Called Us Enemy (Top Shelf Productions)	George Takei, Justin Eisinger, Steven Scott, and Harmony Becker	
2020	Good Talk: A Memoir in Conversations (One World/Random House)	Mira Jacob	
2020	Grass (Drawn & Quarterly)	Keum Suk Gendry-Kim, translation by Janet Hong	
2020	Kid Gloves: Nine Months of Careful Chaos (First Second Books/Macmillan)	Lucy Knisley	
2020	Moonbound: Apollo 11 and the Dream of Spaceflight (Hill & Wang)	Jonathan Fetter-Vorm	
2020	My Solo Exchange Diary, vol. 2 (Seven Seas Entertainment)	Nagata Kabi, translation Jocelyne Allen	
2021	Kent State: Four Dead in Ohio (Abrams Books)	Derf Backderf	
2021	Big Black: Stand at Attica (Archaia Entertainment/Boom! Studios)	Frank “Big Black” Smith, Jared Reinmuth, and Améziane	
2021	Dragon Hoops (First Second Books/Macmillan Publishers)	Gene Luen Yang	
2021	Invisible Differences: A Story of Asperger’s, Adulting, and Living a Life in Full Color (Oni Press)	Mademoiselle Caroline and Julie Dachez, translation by Edward Gauvin	
2021	Paying the Land (Metropolitan Books/Henry Holt and Company)	Joe Sacco	
2021	Year of the Rabbit (Drawn & Quarterly)	Tian Veasna, translation by Helge Dascher	
2023	Flung Out of Space (Abrams ComicArts)	Grace Ellis and Hannah Templer	
2023	Alfred Hitchcock: The Master of Suspense (HBM)	Noël Simsolo and Dominique Hé, translation by Montana Kane	
2023	Alice Guy: First Lady of Film (Self Made Hero)	José-Louis Bocquet and Catel Muller, translation by Edward Gauvin	
2023	But I Live: Three Stories of Child Survivors of the Holocaust (University of Toronto Press)	edited by Charlotte Schallié	
2023	Invisible Wounds: Graphic Journalism (Fantagraphics)	Jess Ruliffson	
2023	Pinball: A Graphic History of the Silver Ball (First Second/Macmillan)	Jon Chad	
2024	Three Rocks: The story of Ernie Bushmiller: The Man Who Created Nancy (Abrams ComicArts)	Bill Griffith	
2024	Are You Willing to Die for the Cause? (Drawn and Quarterly)	Chris Oliveros	
2024	Last on His Feet: Jack Jackson and the Battle of the Century (Liveright)	Adrian Matejka and Youssef Daoudi	
2024	Messenger: The Legend of Muhammad Ali (First Second/Macmillan)	Marc Bernardin and Ron Salas	
2024	Thing: Inside the Struggle for Animal Personhood (Island Press)	Samuel Machado and Cynthia Sousa Machado with Steven M. Wise	
2025	Suffrage Song: The Haunted History of Gender, Race, and Voting Rights in the U.S. (Fantagraphics)	Caitlin Cass	
2025	The Heart That Fed: A Father, a Son, and the Long Shadow of War (Gallery 13)	Carl Sciacchitano	
2025	The Mythmakers: The Remarkable Fellowship of C. S. Lewis & J. R. R. Tolkien (Abrams Fanfare)	John Hendrix	
2025	Djuna (Street Noise Books)	Jon Macy	
2025	The Puerto Rican War: A Graphic History (Union Square)	John Vasquez Mejias	
2026	Black Arms to Hold You Up: A History of Black Resistance (Pantheon)	Ben Passmore	
2026	Do Admit: The Mitford Sisters and Me (Drawn & Quarterly)	Mimi Pond	
2026	Fela: Music is the Weapon (Amistad)	Jibola Fagbamiye, Conor McCreery	
2026	Globetrotters: Nellie Bly and Elizabeth Bisland’s World Tour (Abrams ComicArts)	Julian Voloj and Julie Rocheleau	
2026	Muybridge (Drawn & Quarterly)	Guy Delisle, translated by Helge Daschert, Rob Aspinal	
2026	Surrounded: America's First School for Black Girls, 1832 (Ablaze)	Wilfrid Lupano, Stéphane Fert, translated by Montana Kane	
