= KasuRich =

Japanese manga series

- First tankōbon volume cover

かすりっひ (Kasurihhi)
- Genre: Boys' love
- Manga
- Written by: Gojiai
- Published by: Square Enix
- English publisher: NA: Square Enix Manga & Books
- Imprint: Gangan Comics Pixiv
- Magazine: Gangan Pixiv
- Original run: December 7, 2024 – present
- Volumes: 3

KasuRich (かすりっひ, Kasurihhi) is a Japanese manga series written and illustrated by Gojiai. It began serialization on the Pixiv Comic website under Square Enix's Gangan Pixiv label in December 2024.

== Synopsis ==
The series is centered around the relationship between streamer Rihito Nakamura (a.k.a. Zurich), and his fan Mikado Kasuga. Mikado is an obsessed fan of Zurich, his favorite streamer. The obsession began during his high school years, while watching a stream by Zurich where he said something that gave him motivation. When Zurich grows in popularity, Mikado feels like he is no longer alone in his support for him, which drives him up a wall due to his belief that he is the only one who understands Zurich. On the flipside, Zurich is equally as obsessed with Mikado as vice versa to the point of stalking him on the internet.

== Publication ==
Written and illustrated by Gojiai, KasuRich began serialization on the Pixiv Comic website under Square Enix's Gangan Pixiv label on December 7, 2024. Its chapters have been collected in three tankōbon volumes as of January 2026.

The series' chapters are published in English on Square Enix's Manga Up! Global app. During their panel at Anime Expo 2026, Square Enix Manga & Books announced that they had licensed the series for English publication, with the first volume set to release in February 2027.

No.	Original release date	Original ISBN	North American release date	North American ISBN
1	December 20, 2024	978-4-7575-9584-2	March 16, 2027	979-8-8991-0088-8
2	July 22, 2025	978-4-7575-9971-0	—	—
3	January 22, 2026	978-4-301-00287-1; 978-4-301-00288-8 (SE)	—	—

== Reception ==
The series was nominated for the eleventh Next Manga Awards in 2025 in the web category.
