= Shiota-sensei to Amai-chan =

Japanese manga series

- Cover of the first volume

塩田先生と雨井ちゃん
- Genre: Romantic comedy, slice of life
- Manga
- Written by: Kumiko Nakatoka
- Published by: East Press
- Magazine: Matogrosso; (May 5, 2015 – October 9, 2025)
- Original run: September 12, 2012 – October 9, 2025
- Volumes: 7

Shiota-sensei to Amai-chan (塩田先生と雨井ちゃん) is a Japanese manga series written and illustrated by Kumiko Nakatoka. It began serialization as a webcomic on the author's Pixiv account in September 2012. It was later acquired by East Press who serialized it on their Matogrosso website from May 2015 to October 2025, with its chapters compiled into seven volumes.

== Synopsis ==
The series is centered around the everyday lives of, and romantic relationship between Yayoi Amai, a female high school student, and Tsuguharu Shiota, her male high school teacher.

== Publication ==
Written and illustrated by Kumiko Nakatoka, Shiota-sensei to Amai-chan began serialization on the author's Pixiv account on September 12, 2012. It was later acquired by East Press who serialized it on their Matogrosso website from May 5, 2015 to October 9, 2025. Its chapters were compiled into seven volumes released between May 15, 2015 to December 12, 2025.

No.	Release date	ISBN
1	May 15, 2015	978-4-7816-1304-8
2	May 15, 2017	978-4-7816-1532-5
3	July 12, 2019	978-4-7816-1800-5
4	June 17, 2021	978-4-7816-1988-0
5	March 17, 2023	978-4-7816-2180-7
6	May 17, 2024	978-4-7816-2313-9
7	December 12, 2025	978-4-7816-2180-7

== Reception ==
The series was ranked fourth in the 2016 edition of Takarajimasha's Kono Manga ga Sugoi! guidebook list of the best manga for female readers.
