= Einen Koyō wa Kanō Deshō ka =

Japanese light novel series

- First light novel volume cover

永年雇用は可能でしょうか
- Genre: Romantic fantasy
- Novel series
- Written by: yokuu
- Published by: Shōsetsuka ni Narō
- Original run: September 10, 2021 – July 18, 2023
- Light novel
- Written by: yokuu
- Illustrated by: Ame Karasuba
- Published by: Media Factory
- Imprint: MF Books
- Original run: June 24, 2022 – present
- Volumes: 7
- Manga
- Written by: yokuu
- Illustrated by: Risa Nashikawa
- Published by: Kodansha
- Imprint: KCx
- Magazine: Palcy; Morning Two
- Original run: July 7, 2022 – present
- Volumes: 7
- icon

Einen Koyō wa Kanō Deshō ka (Japanese: 永年雇用は可能でしょうか; lit. 'Is Long-term Employment Possible?') is a Japanese light novel series written by yokuu and illustrated by Ame Karasuba. It was initially serialized on the user-generated novel publishing website Shōsetsuka ni Narō between September 2021 and July 2023. It was later acquired by Media Factory who began publishing it under their MF Books imprint in June 2022. A manga adaptation illustrated by Risa Nashikawa began serialization on Kodansha's Palcy and Morning Two websites in July 2022.

== Synopsis ==
After being unceremoniously booted out from the mansion where she worked and lived for three years, Lucille travels to the countryside in order to find work. She then meets a sorcerer named Phyllis, who offers her a job to work as his housekeeper, so he can focus on his work. As she works for Phyllis, she starts to see a side to him that he didn't let on when they first met, and starts developing feelings for him.

== Media ==
=== Light novel ===
Written by yokuu, Einen Koyō wa Kanō Deshō ka was initially serialized on the user-generated novel publishing website Shōsetsuka ni Narō from September 10, 2021, to July 18, 2023. It was later acquired by Media Factory who began publishing the series with illustrations by Ame Karasuba on June 24, 2022. Seven volumes have been released as of September 2026.

No.	Release date	ISBN
1	June 24, 2022	978-4-04-681491-3
2	November 25, 2022	978-4-04-681841-6
3	July 25, 2023	978-4-04-682652-7
4	March 25, 2024	978-4-04-683376-1
5	February 25, 2025	978-4-04-684182-7
6	November 25, 2025	978-4-04-685201-4
7	September 25, 2026	978-4-04-660323-4

=== Manga ===
A manga adaptation illustrated by Risa Nashikawa began serialization on Kodansha's Pixiv-based website Palcy on July 7, 2022. It also began serialization on Kodansha's Morning Two website on July 22, 2022. The manga's chapters have been compiled into seven tankōbon volumes as of October 2026.

No.	Release date	ISBN
1	November 30, 2022	978-4-06-529764-3
2	April 28, 2023	978-4-06-531118-9
3	October 30, 2023	978-4-06-533240-5
4	May 30, 2024	978-4-06-535374-5
5	October 30, 2025	978-4-06-541021-9
6	April 30, 2026	978-4-06-543089-7
7	October 29, 2026	978-4-06-545216-5

== Reception ==
The manga adaptation won the grand prize at the 2024 EbookJapan Manga Awards. The series, alongside True Love Fades Away When the Contract Ends, won the 2025 Digital Comic Award in the Light Novel category.
