= Wizzywig =

American comic book series by Ed Piskor

- Creator: Ed Piskor
- Date: June 2012
- Main characters: Kevin "Boingthump" Phenicle
- Publisher: Top Shelf Productions

Original publication
- Published in: Wizzywig
- Issues: 3 plus webcomic
- Date of publication: Jan 2009 – Sep 2011
- ISBN: 9781603090971

Ed Piskor talks Wizzywig at the 2013 Notacon

Wizzywig is an American comic book series written and drawn by Ed Piskor. It deals with Kevin J. "Boingthump" Phenicle, Jr. a young prodigy who becomes fascinated with social engineering, phone phreaking, and eventually computer hacking.

The title of the series refers to the computer term, WYSIWYG, an acronym for "What You See Is What You Get" — software which allows content to be edited in a form that resembles its appearance when printed or displayed as a finished product, such as a printed document, web page, or slide presentation.

== Development ==
The project developed when Piskor was working on the nonfiction graphic novel Macedonia (co-written by Heather Roberson and Harvey Pekar). While drawing Macedonia, Piskor became fascinated by hacking history via "Emmanuel Goldstein's" radio show Off the Hook.

In structuring Wizzywig, Piskor combines real hacker stories into one character, merging real and fictional elements. He decided to navigate dual audiences, tech-savvy and newbies, by structuring the story from various perspectives around Phenicle's life, drawing inspiration from cartoonists like Daniel Clowes and Chris Ware.

Piskor meticulously documents his research in Wizzywig, offering a "director's commentary" in Volume 1, where he annotates references and sources. Volume 2 includes an extensive bibliography listing books and resources used. Sources include Off the Hook, the hacker magazine 2600: The Hacker Quarterly, and the pre-Internet online magazine Phrack. Piskor's thorough approach ensures accuracy and authenticity in depicting hacking culture, drawing from a wide array of credible sources.

Piskor uses a four-panel grid layout throughout the series. Like Chester Brown, Piskor did not follow the tradition of drawing Wizzywig comics by the page – he created each panel of the comic as an individual 5" x 5" illustration on a 6" x 7" piece of Bristol board.

== Publication history ==
Piskor started the project with a minicomic called The WYSIWYG Technical Pamphlet. He then self-published Wizzywig in three volumes of 110 pages each from January 2008 to December 2009:

- Volume 1: Phreak (Jan. 2008)
- Volume 2: Hacker (Dec. 2008)
- Volume 3: Fugitive (Dec. 2009)

When volume 3 was released, Piskor made volumes 1 & 2 available for free PDF downloads on his website.

Piskor originally planned to release a printed edition of Volume 4: Inmate, but instead continued the story as a webcomic, Boingthump!, made up of seven chapters, from June 2010 to September 2011.

In June 2012 Top Shelf Productions released the complete, updated and revised, 400-page graphic novel. The cover of the Top Shelf edition was designed to look like an Apple Macintosh 128K personal computer.

== Plot ==
The story begins in what seems to be the mid-to-late 1970s. Volume 1 follows Kevin's journey into phone phreaking, transitioning to Internet hacking in Volume 2 (he receives a TRS-80 model 1 microcomputer as a gift from his grandmother at the end of Volume 1). Near the end of Volume 2, Kevin's exploits land him in solitary confinement for eight months. He tries to "go straight" but falls back into hacking. At the end of Volume 3, he narrowly avoids a raid by the FBI and goes on the run as a fugitive. Volume 3 portrays Kevin's life as a fugitive, as he uses all his accumulated talents and skills to evade the law. As the series progresses, Kevin grows, as well as his trials and tribulations with hacking. His endeavors make him legendary; his abilities are feared and also revered by many.

== Characters ==
Kevin "Boingthump" Phenicle
A composite of many well-known phreaks and hackers such as Kevin Mitnick, Kevin Poulsen, Joybubbles, and many others. Kevin is an orphan whose parents were killed when he was young. When the story starts, he lives with his grandmother in Steel Valley (Pittsburgh) (Piskor's own region). As Piskor said about the character, "Kevin, like many hackers, is just an enthusiastic, obsessive, sage-like, knowledgeable character who is eager to explain how things work and is always looking for an opportunity to drop science on you." Like Harold Gray's Little Orphan Annie and Chester Brown's Louis Riel, Kevin is portrayed with vacant circles for eyes, distinguishing him from all the other characters in the story.

Winston Smith
Kevin's childhood friend, his name is a reference to the main character in George Orwell's Nineteen Eighty-Four. Winston becomes involved in Kevin's various activities. "While Kevin's interest in hacking [is] almost purely a type of intellectual exercise, Winston [is] more fascinated by its political (and otherwise anarchic) possibilities." As a young adult, Winston starts a radio show called Off the Rocker. Winston Smith is based on Emmanuel Goldstein, and Off the Rocker is based on Off the Hook.

Kevin's grandmother
She is never depicted other than in the silhouette or the occasional close-up of her mouth. She is portrayed as generally good-hearted but strict, struggling to provide for herself and Kevin. She loves watching The Honeymooners.

== Reception ==
The Top Shelf collection was one of five graphic novels named to Publishers Weekly's Best of 2012 list. It was also named one of CBR's Best of 2012, and to The A.V. Club's Best of 2012 and Barnes & Noble's Best of 2012 lists. The Comics Journal in a mixed review, said that "Wizzywig was crazy in its ambition as a first major solo work by a young artist, and one can sense that Piskor learned a lot from the experience. We'll see how this sort of self-made comics PhD program accomplished in future projects."

The book earned Piskor and designer Chris Ross a 2013 Eisner Award nomination for Best Publication Design.

Wizzywig was translated into French by Dargaud, and into German (as Wizzywig — Das Porträt eines notorischen Hackers) by Egmont Ehapa.
