= Sandrine Revel =

French Illustrator and author (born 1969)

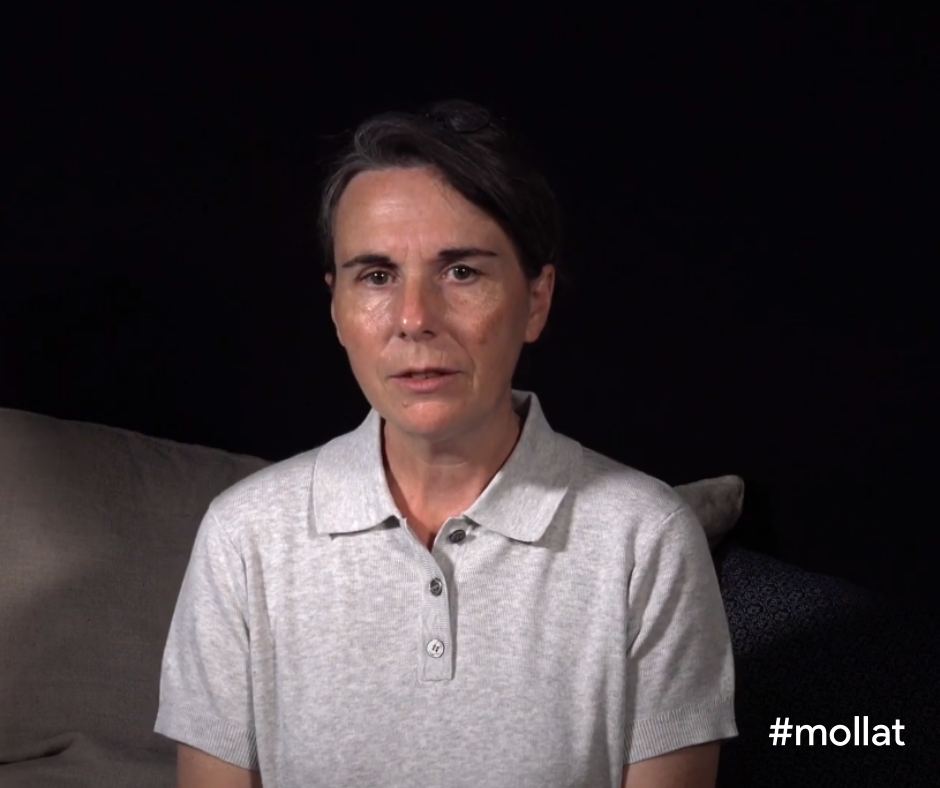
- Revel in 2021
- Born: 3 October 1969 (age 56); Langon, Gironde
- Education: École des beaux-arts de Bordeaux
- Known for: Comic illustrations
- Website: sandrinerevel.com

Sandrine Revel (born 3 October 1969) is a French bande dessinée illustrator and author of comics.

== Biography ==
Born in Langon, Gironde, 3 October 1969, Sandrine Revel spent three years at the École des beaux-arts de Bordeaux and graduated.

In 1996, she published her first album, Jouvence La Bordelaise, based on a script by Frédéric Bouchet and, at the same time, she drew for Sud Ouest Dimanche and Milan Presse.

In 1999, based on a script by Denis-Pierre Filippi, Revel drew the children's comic strip, Un drôle d'ange gardien. The album earned her the Prix jeune espoir at Quai des Bulles in 2000, and, in 2001, the second volume, Un zoo à New York, won the Prix Alph-Art jeunesse at the Angoulême International Comics Festival.

The following year, she published Le 11e jour, a testimony of the September 11 attacks in 2001. She joined forces with Claude Bourgeyx, who wrote the script for her for Monsieur Régis, published in 2009. The following year, she wrote a series, Résurgences, Femmes en voie de resociabilisation (Resurgences, Women on the Way to Resocialization) as well as Sorcellerie & dépendances, a parodic story. Based on a script by Marzena Sowa, Revel drew N'embrassez pas qui vous voulez, published in 2012, about Poland in the Stalin era.

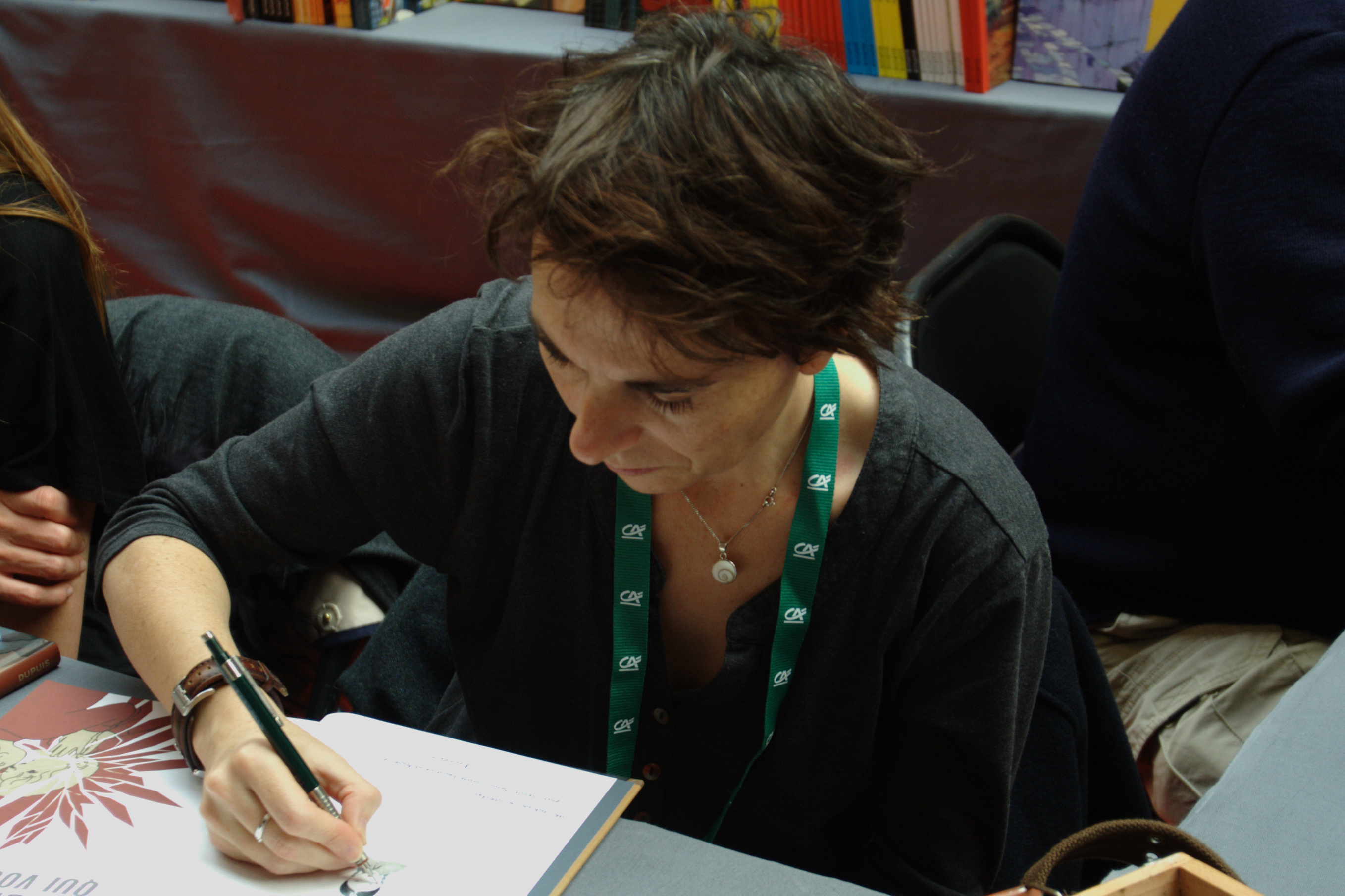
Revel in Saint-Malo in 2012

Inspired by the performance of Océanerosemarie, Revel designed in 2013 La Lesbienne invisible,, on a script by Murielle Magellan. In 2015, Revel illustrated the children's book Le voyage de June written by Sophie Kovess-Brun, and published by Des ronds dans l'O. The book evokes female homosexuality and LGBT parenting through June's "two moms". The same year, a biography on Glenn Gould was published, Glenn Gould, une vie à contretemps, which Revel wrote and illustrated. This work earned her the Prix Artémisia in 2016.

In 2018, she wrote and drew Pygmalion. Three years later, she delivered a biography of Tom Thomson, om Thomson, esquisses d'un printemps. In 2020, on a script by Isabelle Bauthian, Revel drew Chroniques de San Francisco.

In 2022, together with Théa Rojzman, Revel won the high school prize at the Angoulême International Comics Festival for the graphic novel Grand silence, on the theme of sexual violence against children.

== Selected works ==
=== Albums ===
- Jouvence La Bordelaise, script by Frédéric Bouchet, Atlantic Productions, 1996 ISBN 978-2-9509729-0-3
- Les folles aventures d'Ulysse et Umour ou Les joies du camping-car, text by Maïthé Parrot, 1995 BnF 35787436
- Bla Bla Bla !, Le Cycliste, 1998 ISBN 2-912249-43-0
- Le 11e jour, Delcourt, 2002 ISBN 2-84055-940-4
- Intérieur Jazz, Tourism and Convention Bureau, Antibes, 2003 ISBN 2-9520018-0-4 BnF 39010625
- Monsieur Régis, script by Claude Bourgeyx, Les Enfants rouges, 2009 ISBN 978-2-354-19020-0
- Résurgences – Femmes en voie de resociabilisation, La Boîte à bulles, 2010 ISBN 978-2-84953-093-1
- Sorcellerie et dépendances, Dupuis, 2010 ISBN 978-2800148014
- N'embrassez pas qui vous voulez, script by Marzena Sowa, Dupuis, 2013 ISBN 9782800158273
- La Lesbienne invisible, script by Murielle Magellan, based on the show by Océanerosemarie, Delcourt, 2013 ISBN 978-2-7560-4010-3
- Glenn Gould, une vie à contretemps, Dargaud, 2015 ISBN 978-2-205-07090-3
- Pygmalion, freely inspired by the work of Jean-Jacques Rousseau, Les Arènes BD in partnership with France Musique, 2018 ISBN 978-2-352-04748-3
- Tom Thomson, esquisses d'un printemps, Dargaud, 2019 ISBN 978-2-205-07609-7
- Chroniques de San Francisco, script by Isabelle Bauthian, Éditions Steinkis, 2020 ISBN 978-2-368-46359-8
- Grand silence, script by Théa Rojzman, Glénat Editions 2021 ISBN 978-2-344-04105-5

=== Children's albums ===
- Series Un drôle d'ange gardien, script by Denis-Pierre Filippi, Delcourt
  1. Un drôle d'ange gardien, 1998 ISBN 2-84055-273-6
  2. Un zoo à New York, 1999
  3. Diablo et Juliette, 2000
  4. Des vacances d'enfer, 2001
  5. Le voleur d'étoiles, 2001
  6. Le démon chinois, 2004
  7. Le Nuage-Danse, 2008
- Le jardin autre monde, script by Denis-Pierre Filippi, Delcourt, 2006
- Les Petits chats carrés : Petitchat et la lune, with Myriam Revel, Carabas jeunesse 2007 ISBN 9782351002568
- Un amour de pou, text by Gudule, Glénat, 2007 ISBN 9782723457781
- Le voyage de June, written by Sophie Kovess-Brun, Des ronds dans l'O, 2015

== Awards and distinctions ==
- 2001: Alph-Art Youth Prize at the Angoulême International Comics Festival for the album Un drôle d'ange gardien, volume 2: Un zoo à New York, written by Denis-Pierre Filippi, illustrated by Revel
- 2016: Prix Artémisia for Glenn Gould, une vie à contretemps
- 2022: Prix des lycées at the Angoulême International Comics Festival with Théa Rojzman (script) for Grand silence
- 2022: Special Mention Prize, Jury œcuménique de la bande dessinée for Grand Silence
- 2022: Prix étudiant de la BD politique-LCP for Grand Silence
