= Notacon =

Notacon logo

Notacon (pronounced "not-a-con") was an art and technology conference which took place annually in Cleveland, Ohio from 2003 to 2014. Notacon ceased operations in 2014. The name Notacon became a bacronym for Northern Ohio Technological Advancement Conference; however, use of this was mostly dropped after the first year.

== History ==
Ed Piskor talks Wizzywig at the 2013 Notacon

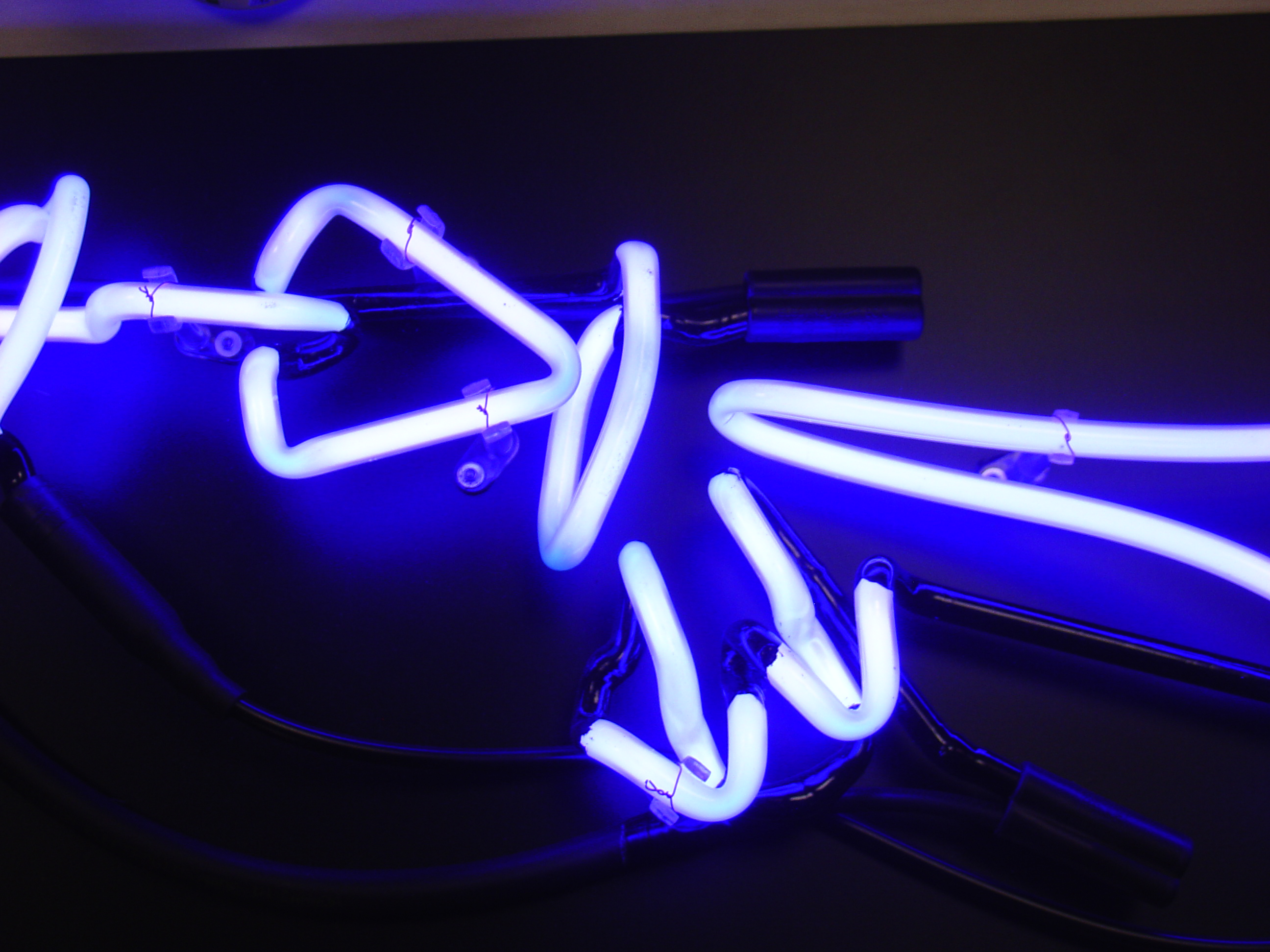
Neon Light display at Notacon, 2009

The conference was founded in 2003 by "FTS Conventures", a small group of friends who wanted to strengthen and expand their community. The conference was also founded in part to fill the vacuum caused by the sudden ending of the Detroit, Michigan Rubi-Con event, though it has now achieved its own personality and prominence.

While many hacker conventions focus on the mechanics or political issues that surround such activities, Notacon's focus was more on the underlying beauty or artistry of the technique of hacking, as well as other ways to apply a "hacker mentality" to the areas of art and music. Hence, in addition to topics of technology and computer security, many aspects of both the art and music world were represented. The concept of "community through technology" was one of the main focuses of Notacon, with the participants being dedicated to the advancement of computer technology.

== Notacon 3 ==
Notacon 3, took place April 7–9, 2006, with talks such as "Make Your Own Linux", "Blended Threat Management", "How to Survive a Federal Investigation", "The Great Failure of Wikipedia", "Kryptos and the Da Vinci Code", "HajjiNets: Running an ISP in a War Zone" and "Your Moment of Audio Zen: A History of Podcasts". A few of the talks were in direct association with the computer club Infonomicon, as several of their more high-profile members spoke at the con, including droops, kn1ghtl0rd, p0trill023, irongeek, and ponyboy. Other notable speakers in 2006 included Jason Scott, Elonka Dunin, Drew Curtis, and Eric Meyer

== Notacon 4 ==
Notacon 4, April 27–29, 2007, worked as an incubator for Blockparty, the largest running North American demoparty. This collaborative effort allowed the fledgling party to utilize the existing support structure of an established conference. 2007 also featured the first known presentation from a deceased community member, a multimedia update to a talk given at Rubi-con 5 called "Secrets of the Phone Guy". This remixed presentation was titled "Secrets of the Dead Phone Guy" and was presented by "The Friends of DanKaye". Also featured were presentations such as: "DIY Green Energy", "Why Building Hacker Spaces is Necessary and How to Do It", "Online Communities and the Politics of DDoS", "Notageek: Technology and Everyone Else", "8 Dirty Secrets of the Security Industry", and "Open Source Economic Development"

== Notacon Radio ==
In 2005, 2006, and 2007, Notacon also included the Notacon Radio project, hosted by Jason Scott. Essentially an event-long Icecast (using Oddcast and Icecast2), Scott provided running audio commentary of the event, its attendees, and the world at large. The broadcast was also opened up to other contributors, including local tech-talkers Dial-a-Dork, who did a four-hour live show.
