= True Love Fades Away When the Contract Ends =

Japanese web novel series

- First light novel volume cover

運命の恋人は期限付き (Unmei no Koibito wa Kigen Tsuki)
- Genre: Historical, romance
- Novel series
- Written by: Kosuzu Kobato
- Published by: Shōsetsuka ni Narō
- Original run: May 29, 2020 – July 30, 2021
- Manga
- Written by: Kosuzu Kobato
- Illustrated by: Murasaki Shido
- Published by: Micro Magazine
- English publisher: NA: Seven Seas Entertainment
- Imprint: Ride Comics
- Magazine: Comic Ride; (July 30, 2021 – January 30, 2023); Comic Ride Ivy; (March 20, 2023 – present)
- Original run: July 30, 2021 – present
- Volumes: 3
- Light novel
- Written by: Kosuzu Kobato
- Illustrated by: Fumi Takamura
- Published by: Micro Magazine
- English publisher: NA: Seven Seas Entertainment
- Imprint: Maple Novels
- Original run: December 23, 2022 – October 23, 2026
- Volumes: 4

True Love Fades Away When the Contract Ends (運命の恋人は期限付き, Unmei no Koibito wa Kigen Tsuki) is a Japanese web novel series written by Kozusu Kobato. It was serialized on the user-generated novel publishing website Shōsetsuka ni Narō between May 2020 and July 2021. A manga adaptation illustrated by Murasaki Shido was serialized in Micro Magazine's Comic Ride web manga magazine between July 2021 and January 2023. It was later transferred to the Comic Ride Ivy web manga magazine in March 2023. A light novel version with illustrations by Fumi Takamura was published under Micro Magazine's Maple Novels imprint from December 2022 to October 2026.

== Synopsis ==
Despite being born to a noble family, Fiona prefers to live a lifestyle independent of the nobility. However, her family plans an arranged marriage behind her back that would threaten the lifestyle that Fiona has been living. She later meets the man who she has been arranged to marry: Giles, who also has the same desire as Fiona. In order to achieve their goals, the two pretend to be destined lovers.

== Media ==
=== Web novel ===
Written by Kosuzu Kobato, True Love Fades Away When the Contract Ends was serialized on the user-generated novel publishing website Shōsetsuka ni Narō between May 29, 2020, and July 30, 2021.

=== Manga ===
A manga adaptation illustrated by Murasaki Shido was initially serialized in Micro Magazine's Comic Ride web manga magazine from July 30, 2021, to January 30, 2023. The manga was later transferred to Micro Magazine's newly launched Comic Ride Ivy web manga magazine on March 20, 2023. The manga's chapters have been collected into three tankōbon volumes as of August 2025.

The manga adaptation is licensed in English by Seven Seas Entertainment.

No.	Original release date	Original ISBN	North American release date	North American ISBN
1	November 29, 2021	978-4-86716-213-2	May 7, 2024	979-8-88843-757-5
Acts 1–5; Special Story: "Her First Escort"
2	October 31, 2022	978-4-86716-354-2	September 3, 2024	979-8-88843-758-2
Acts 6–11
3	August 28, 2025	978-4-86716-824-0	April 14, 2026	979-8-89160-674-6
Acts 12–18

=== Light novel ===
A digital light novel version with illustrations by Fumi Takamura was published under Micro Magazine's Maple Novels imprint from December 23, 2022 to October 23, 2026.

The light novels are also licensed in English by Seven Seas Entertainment.

No.	Title	Original release date	North American release date
1	One Star in the Night Sky 夜空のひとつ星の巻	December 23, 2022	May 9, 2024 (digital); June 11, 2024 (print); 979-8-88843-759-9
2	Music of the Flower Gardens and Heavens 花の庭と天上の音楽の巻	April 19, 2024	January 16, 2025 (digital); February 11, 2025 (print); 979-8-89373-184-2
3	The Secret of the Rose 薔薇の秘密と舞踏会の巻	December 24, 2024	February 12, 2026 (digital); March 3, 2026 (print); 979-8-89561-870-7
4	— 刻まれる約束の巻	October 23, 2026	—

== Reception ==
The series, alongside Einen Koyō wa Kanō Deshō ka, won the 2025 Digital Comic Award in the Light Novel category.
