= Hip Hop Family Tree =

2015–2016 comic book limited series by Ed Piskor

- Hip Hop Family Tree #1, depicting DJ Kool Herc

Publication information
- Publisher: Boing Boing (2012–2015); Fantagraphics (2013–2016)
- Schedule: Monthly
- Format: Limited series
- Genre: Historical
- Publication date: August 2015–July 2016
- No. of issues: 12

Creative team
- Created by: Ed Piskor
- Written by: Ed Piskor
- Artist: Ed Piskor
- Penciller: Ed Piskor
- Inker: Ed Piskor
- Letterer: Ed Piskor
- Colorist: Ed Piskor

Collected editions
- Hip Hop Family Tree Vols 1-2: 1975–1983 gift boxed set: ISBN 978-1606997918
- Hip Hop Family Tree 1983–1985 gift boxed set: ISBN 978-1606999417
- Hip Hop Family Tree: The Omnibus: ISBN 978-1683968894

Piskor discussing his method and love of comics in 2016

Piskor discussing his love of hip hop in 2016 (alongside Jaime Hernandez, discussing his love of punk rock)

Hip Hop Family Tree is a series of educational and historical comic books by Ed Piskor that documents the early history of hip hop culture. Originating online with Boing Boing, the series was published in print form by Fantagraphics. The first collection was a 2014 New York Times Graphic Books Best Seller (#7) and was listed in The Washington Post Top 10 graphic novels of 2013. The second collection won the Eisner Award for Best Reality-Based Work in 2015.

Piskor's artistic style in Hip Hop Family Tree—including his use of Ben-Day Dots—hearkens back to the comic book styles prevalent during the period being retold. Robert Crumb is openly referenced as an inspiration to Piskor, who cites Crumb's "Heroes of Blues, Jazz & Country" trading cards as an influence. Crumb and Piskor are similar in their commemorations of key artists and musical figures, and the informative narration of their chosen genre's historical evolution.

== Publication history ==
Hip Hop Family Tree began on Boing Boing in January 2012 as a one-page "semi-regular ongoing feature", and ran, mostly weekly, until December 2015. Fantagraphics released the first "Treasury" collection, Hip Hop Family Tree Vol. 1: 1970s–1981, in 2013, and the second collection, covering the years 1981–1983, in 2014; both of which collected material that had been previously published on Boing Boing. That year the publisher also released a "Gift Box Set", collecting the first two treasury editions.

In August 2015, Fantagraphics released the third collection, covering the years 1983–1984, while also beginning a monthly magazine-format limited series. That series ran 12 issues, through July 2016. Fantagraphics published volume 4 of the Treasury collection in July 2016. That year the publisher also released a "Gift Box Set", collecting volumes 3 and 4 of the Treasury editions.

An omnibus release of the entire series was released on October 17, 2023, sold in a deluxe hardcover with 140 pages of extras.

== Issues ==
1. "DJ Kool Herc Spawns a Culture" (Aug. 2015)
2. "Rapper's Delight" (Sept. 2015)
3. (Oct. 2015)
4. (Nov. 2015)
5. "Culture Vultures: Ice-T Pulls a Lick!" (Dec. 2015)
6. "The Wild Style Issue" (Jan. 2016)
7. "World Class Wreckin' Cru" (Feb. 2016)
8. (Mar. 2016)
9. "Young Jeezy, Weezy, and Yeezy!" (Apr. 2016)
10. "Wanted: Cap-One" (May 2016)
11. "Beastie Boys' New DJ... Rick Rubin" (June 2016)
12. (July 2016)

=== Treasury editions ===
- Hip Hop Family Tree Book 1: 1970s–1981 (October 2013) – centers on the formative years of hip hop, presenting the intersecting stories of the genre's earliest pioneers and encompassing all aspects of the culture: DJing, B-boying, MCing, and graffiti. The comic begins with an introduction of DJ Kool Herc and his famous rec-room parties at 1520 Sedgwick Avenue – following with Afrika Bambaataa, Grandmaster Flash and DJ Breakout, rival DJs with reign over their own subsections of the Bronx. The narrative also includes the stories of Russell "Rush" Simmons and his management of Kurtis Blow, and the young, ambitious Joseph "Run" Simmons prior to the advent of Run–D.M.C. Other notable mentions include Sylvia Robinson and her creation of The Sugarhill Gang, Fab Five Freddy and his involvement with graffiti, and the underground New York art and punk scene, Bobby Robinson's influential Enjoy Records, as well as the rebellious, early years of Rick Rubin which ultimately led to his contributions to hip hop. Piskor also references lesser known acts who share an integral place in the culture, such as the Funky 4 + 1, Grand Wizzard Theodore, The Cold Crush Brothers, DJ Disco Wiz, Treacherous Three, Grandmaster Caz, and the Fantastic Five. The volume concludes with the 1981 segment from 20/20 which presented hip hop to mainstream America, cementing the genre's transition from a primarily urban, grassroots movement to an international, money-making phenomenon.
- Hip Hop Family Tree Book 2: 1981–1983 (August 2014) – during this period hip hop transitioned from parks and recreation rooms to downtown clubs and vinyl records. The performers began to make moves to separate themselves from their fans by dressing more and more flamboyantly—until a new group called Run-DMC came on the scene to take things back to the streets. Hip Hop Family Tree volume 2 covers hits like Afrika Bambaataa's "Planet Rock", Grandmaster Flash and the Furious Five's "The Message", the movie Wild Style, and the introduction of acts like N.W.A., the Beastie Boys, Doug E. Fresh, KRS-One, Ice-T, and early Public Enemy; as well as cameos by Dolemite, LL Cool J, The Notorious B.I.G., and New Kids on the Block.
- Hip Hop Family Tree Book 3: 1983–1984 (August 2015) – highlights Run DMC's rise to fame, as well as the introduction of acts like Whodini, The Fat Boys, Slick Rick, and Doug E Fresh. The Beastie Boys become a rap group. Rick Rubin meets Russell Simmons to form Def Jam Recordings. Volume 3 also highlights the famous TV pilot to the dance show Graffiti Rock and the documentaries Style Wars and Breakin' 'n' Enterin''.
- Hip Hop Family Tree Book 4: 1984–1985 (July 2016) – charts the rise of Dr. Dre and Def Jam Records, and introduces new branches on the "tree": Will Smith, Salt-N-Pepa, Rakim, and Biz Markie. Highlights the films Hollywood released in an attempt to cash in on the phenomenon, like Breakin', Breakin' 2: Electric Boogaloo, Beat Street, Krush Groove, and others.
- Hip Hop Family Tree: The Omnibus (October 17, 2023) – Composes of all four books in hardcover with extras.
