= Ed Piskor =

American alternative comics artist (1982–2024)

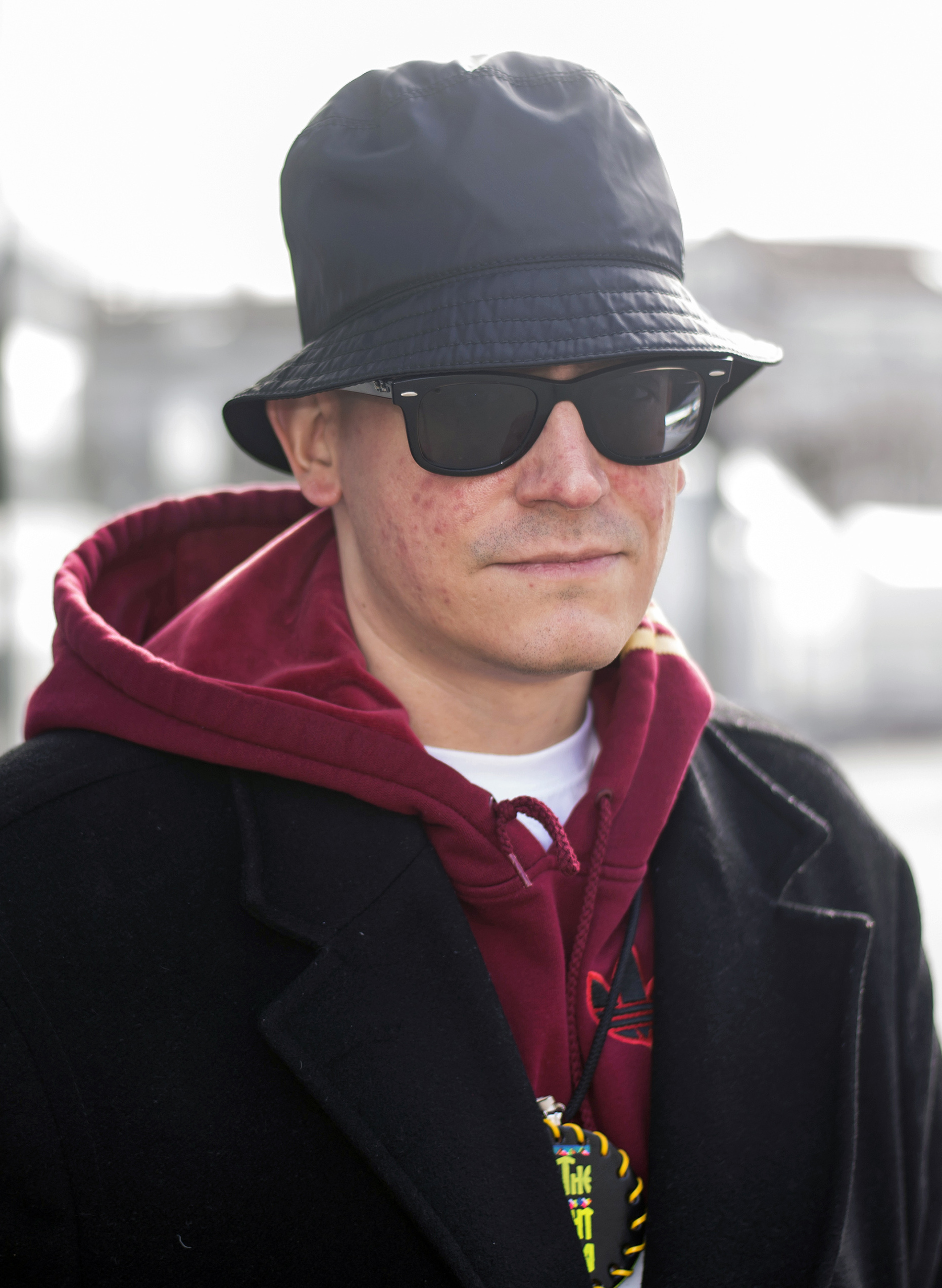
- Piskor in 2017
- Born: July 28, 1982 Homestead, Pennsylvania, U.S.
- Died: April 1, 2024 (aged 41) Munhall, Pennsylvania, U.S.
- Area: Artist
- Notable works: American Splendor; Hip Hop Family Tree; Wizzywig; X-Men: Grand Design
- Awards: Eisner Award (2015); Dragon Award (2019); Eisner Award (2024)

Edward R. Piskor Jr. (/ˈpɪskər/; July 28, 1982 – April 1, 2024) was an American alternative comics cartoonist. Piskor was known primarily for his work on Hip Hop Family Tree, X-Men: Grand Design, and the Red Room trilogy. Piskor also co-hosted the YouTube channel Cartoonist Kayfabe with fellow Pittsburgh native cartoonist Jim Rugg. In March 2024, Piskor was accused via social media of sexual misconduct. Piskor died on April 1, 2024, at the age of 41, hours after posting a suicide note via social media, defending himself against the allegations leveled against him.

== Early life and education ==
Edward Piskor was born in Homestead, Pennsylvania, on July 28, 1982. He was fascinated by comics throughout his childhood. He was a great fan of mainstream comics such as The Amazing Spider-Man, but his interest in alternative comics developed rapidly when, at the age of 9, he saw a documentary that featured Harvey Pekar reading one of his American Splendor stories. Important influences included Harvey Kurtzman, Will Eisner, Jack Kirby, Robert Crumb, Daniel Clowes, Chris Ware, Kim Deitch, Gilbert Shelton, and Frank Miller.

After finishing high school, Piskor attended The Kubert School for a year, which he characterized as a mixed experience. Returning to Pittsburgh, Piskor established contact with other local area cartoonists, including Jim Rugg, Paulette Poullet, Pat Lewis, Tom Scioli, and Mark Zingarelli.

== Career ==
Piskor talks Wizzywig at the 2009 Notacon

Piskor discussing his method and love of comics in 2016

In 2003, Piskor started collaborating with Jay Lynch on comics for Mineshaft, while working on his own minicomic Deviant Funnies, first published in 2004. In addition, Piskor's autobiographical minicomic Isolation Chamber was published in 2004–2005.

During this period, Piskor began working with Harvey Pekar, his first major task being illustrating stories of American Splendor: Our Movie Year (2004), which elaborates Pekar's experience after the release of the American Splendor movie. Piskor also illustrated Pekar's graphic novel Macedonia, about "a young female student that travels from the USA to Macedonia in order to try and understand how the country has survived the break-up of Yugoslavia without spiraling into civil war as its neighboring nations did." Macedonia was released in 2007 through Villard Books. Piskor further worked with Pekar on The Beats: A Graphic History, published in 2009.

From 2008 to 2011, Piskor published Wizzywig, his own comic book series about a prodigy who becomes fascinated with social engineering, phone phreaking, and eventually computer hacking. The collected Wizzywig was published by Top Shelf Productions in 2012.

Piskor's Eisner Award-winning series Hip Hop Family Tree is a historical account of hip hop culture and the artists that have shaped the genre. The project began in January 2012, serialized by Piskor on the website Boing Boing as a one-page "semi-regular ongoing feature," running, mostly weekly, until December 2015. Hip Hop Family Tree was collected and published by Fantagraphics in four books from 2013 to 2021.

From 2017 to 2019, Piskor wrote and illustrated X-Men: Grand Design, a three-volume series focusing on the history of the X-Men, for Marvel Comics.

In 2020, Piskor began serializing a graphic novel titled Red Room on his Patreon page. The complete story was published over three volumes published by Fantagraphics from 2021 to 2024.

In January 2024, Piskor started posting a daily comic strip online, Switchblade Shorties, which followed the (mis)adventures of five mischievous girls in the 1990s. Serialization was left unfinished with Piskor's death.

== Cartoonist Kayfabe and comics historian ==
Piskor and Jim Rugg discussing Cartoonist Kayfabe in 2019

The Cartoonist Kayfabe YouTube series, created by Piskor and Jim Rugg, significantly impacted the comic book community by revisiting classic comic books, discussing the processes and stories behind them, and featuring notable figures from the industry. (The term "kayfabe" is generally used to refer to the portrayal of staged events within the world of professional wrestling as real, including the presentation of competition, rivalries, and personas. Piskor and Rugg shifted that approach to the comics industry.) Cartoonist Kayfabe has amassed over 1,800+ videos in its library since its creation.

Cartoonist Kayfabe engaged with pivotal comic creators, thus preserving and celebrating the history of comics through detailed discussions. This approach not only educated viewers about comic book artistry and storytelling but also celebrated the legacy of influential comic book series and their creators. One of the standout achievements of the series was the reunion of Kevin Eastman and Peter Laird for commentary on their iconic Teenage Mutant Ninja Turtles comics.

Following Piskor's death, Rugg continued to post their backlog of previously recorded discussions online for several weeks, per Piskor's request. In July 2024, a video of the 'Ed Piskor Memorial Panel' from HeroesCon 2024 was posted.

== Allegations and death ==
In March 2024, cartoonist Molly Dwyer accused Piskor of engaging in inappropriate communication with her via social media in 2020 while she was 17 years old. A second cartoonist named Molly Wright accused him of offering to trade an industry contact for a sexual favor in the past. After the allegations were made, Piskor deleted both his and the Cartoonist Kayfabe X accounts. He also briefly deleted the Cartoonist Kayfabe YouTube channel before restoring it with comments removed. The accusations led to the indefinite postponement of an exhibition featuring Piskor's art that had been scheduled to run from April to August 2024. On that same day, a reporter for WTAE-TV news reporting on the show's cancellation visited the homes of both Piskor and his parents. The news report that aired neglected to blur out the house numbers on either home. On March 30, Piskor's Cartoonist Kayfabe co-host, Jim Rugg, announced that he had decided to end his professional relationship with Piskor as a result of the allegations.

Piskor died on April 1, 2024, in Munhall, Pennsylvania, at the age of 41. The announcement of his death came several hours after he posted a note online, insinuating his intention to kill himself. In writing about the prior week, Piskor referred to the accusations, the cancellation of his art show, the loss of a $75,000 deal, Rugg's professional separation, and the news reporter showing up at his and his parents homes and broadcasting their addresses as being "too much". He directly addressed Dwyer and those he felt had been waiting for this to happen. In response to his accusers, he stated that the chats with Dwyer had been out of friendship and that the two times he had engaged in sexual intercourse with Wright were consensual and initiated by her. Toward the end of his note, he addressed the people who he felt had pre-judged him and spread gossip on the internet by stating, "I was murdered by Internet bullies. Massive amounts of them. Some of you out there absolutely contributed to my death as you were entertaining yourself with gossip. I wasn’t AI. I was a real human being. You chipped little bits of my self esteem away all week until I was vaporized."

In June 2024, Heroes Convention featured a memorial panel for Piskor, including Rugg, Piskor's sisters, Michel Fiffe, Jim Mahfood, and Chris Pitzker. The inaugural Eddie P. Comic Con was announced for the following August.

== Art style ==
Piskor's art was rooted in alternative and underground comics traditions, characterized by dense, text-driven pages, heavy use of solid blacks, and tightly controlled linework. His drawings often feature slightly exaggerated figures, with careful cross-hatching and shading used to build texture and depth, while compositions prioritize clarity and information over visual spectacle.

Early in his career, Piskor's work was characterized as "somewhat cheeky, but very accomplished alt-comics style, utilising lots of solid blacks, careful shading and only slightly off-kilter figure work. His art bears a mature signature that wouldn't look out of place in any of the finer indy comix houses of the last twenty years." His work on Macedonia was criticized for being "stiff" by some reviewers but praised by others for its "stylish, crisp feel".

In later works such as Hip Hop Family Tree and X-Men: Grand Design, Piskor's style was noted for its deliberately retro aesthetic — echoing mid- to late-20th-century comics — combined with meticulous visual detail and a documentary approach to pacing and presentation.

== Awards ==
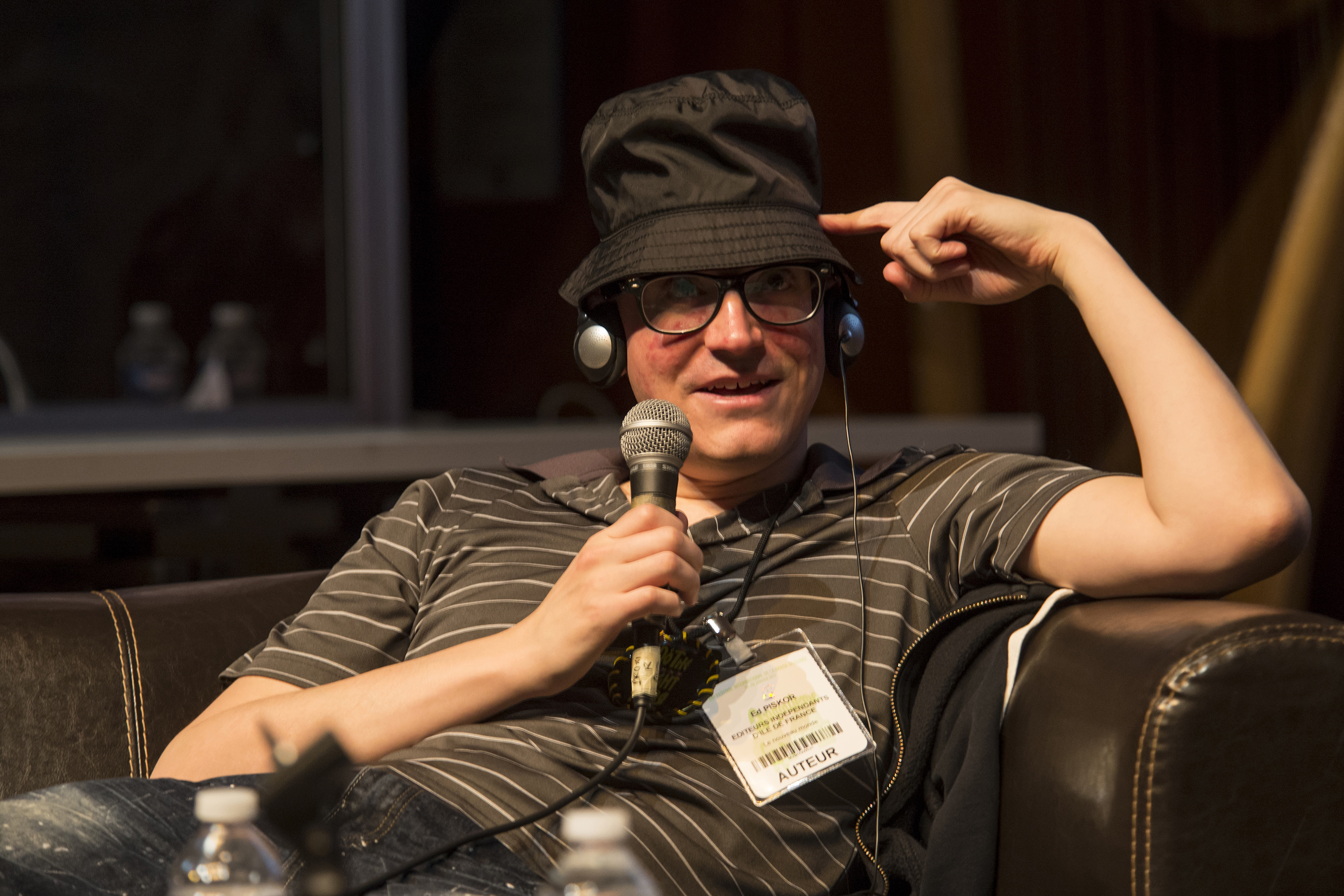
Piskor in 2017

Piskor was the recipient of the 2015 Eisner Award for Best Reality-Based Work for Hip Hop Family Tree Book 2, and a 2019 Dragon Award for Best Graphic Novel for X-Men: Grand Design – Second Genesis. In addition, he was nominated for a number of other awards:

- 2013 (nomination) Eisner Award for Best Publication Design for Wizzywig (Ed Piskor & Chris Ross)
- 2014:
  - (nomination) Eisner Award for Best Lettering for Hip Hop Family Tree Book 1: 1970s–1981
  - (nomination) Eisner Award for Best Reality-Based Work for Hip Hop Family Tree Book 1: 1970s–1981
  - (nomination) Ignatz Award for Outstanding Artist for Hip Hop Family Tree Book 1: 1970s–1981
- 2015 Eisner Award for Best Reality-Based Work for Hip Hop Family Tree Book 2: 1981–1983
- 2016:
  - (nomination) Eisner Award for Best Cover Artist for Hip Hop Family Tree Book 3: 1983–1984
  - (nomination) Eisner Award for Best Reality-Based Work for Hip Hop Family Tree Book 3: 1983–1984
- 2018 (nomination) Eisner Award for Best Coloring for X-Men: Grand Design
- 2019 Dragon Award for Best Graphic Novel for X-Men: Grand Design – Second Genesis
- 2024 Eisner Award for reprint of Hip Hop Family Tree – The Omnibus

== Works ==
Piskor discussing his love of hip hop in 2016 (alongside Jaime Hernandez, discussing punk)

=== Collaborations ===
- Tinnell, Robert; —; Saviuk, Alex (2005). Feast of the Seven Fishes. Allegheny Image Factory.
- Pekar, Harvey; Roberson, Heather; — (2007). Macedonia. New York, NY: Villard/Random House. ISBN 9780345498991. OCLC 0345498992.
- Pekar, Harvey (2009). Buhle, Paul (ed.). The Beats: A Graphic History. Hill & Wang. ISBN 978-0-285-63858-7. — additional writing by Nancy Peters, Penelope Rosemont, Joyce Brabner, Trina Robbins, and Tuli Kupferberg; art mostly by Piskor, with additional art by Jay Kinney, Nick Thorkelson, Summer McClinton, Peter Kuper, Mary Fleener, Gary Dumm, Lance Tooks, Jeffrey Lewis, Jerome Neukirch, Anne Timmons, and Gary Dumm.

=== Solo projects ===
- — (2012). Wizzywig. Marietta, Ga.: Top Shelf Productions. ISBN 9781603090971. OCLC 882988623.
- — (2013). Hip Hop Family Tree: 1970s–1981. Seattle, Washington: Fantagraphics Books, Inc. ISBN 9781606996904. OCLC 1416760369.
- — (2017). Hip Hop Family Tree: 1981–1983. Seattle, Washington: Fantagraphics Books, Inc. ISBN 9781606997567. OCLC 1104332086.
- — (2021). Hip Hop Family Tree: 1983–1984. Seattle, Washington: Fantagraphics Books, Inc. ISBN 9781606998489. OCLC 1409373827.
- — (2021). Hip Hop Family Tree: 1984–1985. Seattle, Washington: Fantagraphics Books, Inc. ISBN 9781606999400. OCLC 1410377997.
- — (2018). X-Men: Grand Design. New York, NY: Marvel Worldwide, Inc. ISBN 9781302904890. OCLC 1030161058.
- — (2018). X-Men: Grand Design – Second Genesis. New York, NY: Marvel Worldwide, Inc. ISBN 9781302904906. OCLC 1302904906.
- — (2019). X-Men: Grand Design – X-Tinction. New York, NY: Marvel Worldwide, Inc. ISBN 9781302904913. OCLC 1302904914.
- — (2021). Red Room: The Antisocial Network. Seattle, Washington: Fantagraphics Books, Inc. ISBN 9781683964681. OCLC 1241071023.
- — (2022). Red Room: Trigger Warnings. Seattle, Washington: Fantagraphics Books, Inc. ISBN 9781683965602. OCLC 1285123629.
- — (2024). Red Room: Crypto Killaz!. Seattle, Washington: Fantagraphics Books, Inc. ISBN 9781683969303. OCLC 1390189451.
