= X-Men: Grand Design =

American comic book series by Ed Piskor

Publication information
- Publisher: Marvel Worldwide, Inc.
- Format: Ongoing series
- Genre: Superhero comics
- Publication date: Feb. 2018–Aug. 2019
- No. of issues: 6
- Main character: X-Men

Creative team
- Written by: Ed Piskor
- Artist: Ed Piskor
- Letterer: Ed Piskor
- Colorist: Ed Piskor
- Editor: Chris Robinson

Collected editions
- Marvel Omnibus: X-Men: Grand Design: ISBN 978-1302925246
- X-Men: Grand Design Trilogy: ISBN 978-1-302-95724-7

X-Men: Grand Design is an American comic book series by Ed Piskor featuring the X-Men and published by Marvel Comics in 2018–2019. The series — composed of three 2-issue limited series — abridges and condenses four decades of X-Men-related canon from 1963 to the late 1980s.

Piskor wrote, drew, colored, and lettered X-Men: Grand Design, which was described as the first superhero comic by a single creator that Marvel had published since Rick Veitch's The One in 1985–1986.

== Overview ==
Piskor, whose previous published comics were in the alternative comics vein, described the project as an "adaptation" and as a "remix". As the series was described in Bleeding Cool, Piskor's goal was to tell "the story of the X-Men as if it were all planned out from the beginning. Each chapter condenses a decade of X-Men adventures into a single comic....".

== Publication history ==
As a child, Piskor drew "hundreds of pages" of X-Men stories. With X-Men: Grand Design, he "tasked himself with piecing together a cohesive narrative from a series created by dozens of artists and writers over the course of decades". The series was originally shepherded by Marvel editor-in-chief Axel Alonso, "who let the cartoonist retell one of the most beloved and longest-lived superhero series through the filter of alternative comics". Alonso left Marvel, however, before the series was published.

X-Men: Grand Design was published as three separate two-issue limited series in 2018 and 2019:

- X-Men: Grand Design (2 issues, Feb–Mar 2018)
- X-Men: Grand Design — Second Genesis (2 issues, Sep–Oct 2018)
- X-Men: Grand Design — X-Tinction (2 issues, Jul–Aug 2019)

Individual issues included "Additional Reading" sections by Daron Jensen and Jeph York that functioned as bibliographies.

All six issues were collected in 2020 and published by Marvel as Marvel Omnibus: X-Men: Grand Design (ISBN 978-1302925246). The series was collected again in 2023 as X-Men: Grand Design Trilogy (ISBN 978-1-302-95724-7). The second collection was translated and published in France (Panini France) and Brazil (Panini Brasil).

== Plot ==
In general, the plot of X-Men: Grand Design follows that of the original X-Men comics, as written primarily by Stan Lee and then Chris Claremont.

The first series of X-Men: Grand Design covers the Silver Age X-Men period, roughly 1963 to 1970. The plot focuses on the back stories of Namor, Professor X, Cain Marko, and Magneto; and the original team of Cyclops, Marvel Girl, Beast, Angel, and Iceman; along with the Brotherhood of Evil Mutants featuring Mastermind, Quicksilver, Scarlet Witch, and Toad. A running subplot involves anti-mutant hysteria and the activities of Robert Kelly, Bolivar Trask, Larry Trask, and the Sentinels; as well as Cameron Hodge and The Right.

The second series, Second Genesis, covers the introduction of the "New X-Men," made up of Cyclops, Colossus, Nightcrawler, Storm, Thunderbird, Banshee, Sunfire, and Wolverine. Second Genesis #2 features The Dark Phoenix Saga, and covers the X-Men's encounters with the Shi'ar, the Brood, and the Starjammers, as well as the inaugural X-Men adventures of Kitty Pryde and Carol Danvers. The character of Madelyne Pryor is substantially rewritten in Second Genesis #2. Madelyne debuts and participates in stories that originally featured Lee Forrester, who is entirely excluded in this retelling (but is name-dropped later in the series' final panel). When Madelyne and Cyclops meet and begin their relationship, Madelyne is not a pilot in Alaska but is still described as surviving a plane crash in the past, and Mastermind's manipulations of Madelyne never happen before she and Cyclops marry.

The third series, X-Tinction, tracks storylines such as the 1986 "Mutant Massacre" and 1988's "The Fall of the Mutants", as well as the return of Jean Grey, the trial of Magneto, and the 1990 storyline "X-Tinction Agenda". Madelyne Pryor's history continues in the first half of X-Tinction, starting with the birth of Nathan Summers and the marriage's disintegration, to concluding at her death during the "Inferno" storyline. Most of the rest of her story with the X-Men is here. Madelyne is emphasized as the victim in everything, not culpable for "Inferno" nor intending to harm her son. Her death is presented as more accidental instead of suicide.

== Reception ==
Piskor was nominated for the 2018 Eisner Award for Best Coloring for X-Men: Grand Design.

X-Men: Grand Design — Second Genesis won the 2019 Dragon Award for Best Graphic Novel.

The Comics Journal gave the first two series a mixed review. Critic Martin Brown wrote, "The best thing that Grand Design has done to date is the very first thing that it did: it reframes the X-Men's story as a philosophical showdown between Professor X and Magneto". But Brown complained that in the end, Piskor found it...

"difficult to completely reject a milieu while drawing inspiration from it. Add that to the list of other contradictions embodied by Grand Design, and you have a book completely at odds with itself. Piskor seems to undercut himself at every turn, which tends to be the mark of a creator who lacks a unifying vision.... Piskor promises nothing if not coherence; he demands creative control, works in isolation, and eliminates direct ties to the source material, like asterisks and annotated bibliographies; and then he abdicates the responsibility to deliver on his one promise. That’s the failure of Grand Design: Piskor sells himself as an auteur, but he doesn’t really have anything to say.
