= Nagata Kabi =

Japanese manga artist (born 1987)

Nagata Kabi 永田カビ
- Born: May 28, 1987 (age 39)
- Area: Manga artist
- Notable works: My Lesbian Experience with Loneliness
- Awards: Harvey Award; Crunchyroll Anime Awards

Nagata Kabi (Japanese: 永田カビ, Hepburn: Nagata Kabi; pen name; born May 28, 1987) is a Japanese manga artist, best known for My Lesbian Experience with Loneliness.

== Early life ==
Nagata has been drawing for as long as she can remember. However, she did not start reading manga until 4th grade with Takehiko Inoue's sports manga Slam Dunk. She subsequently started reading other Weekly Shōnen Jump manga series, naming Nobuhiro Watsuki's samurai manga Rurouni Kenshin as her favourite in middle school.

== Works ==
=== My Lesbian Experience with Loneliness ===
Nagata published My Lesbian Experience With Loneliness first on the Japanese website Pixiv before its revised version was released as a printed volume in 2016. This autobiographical manga deals with Nagata's mental health issues and her homosexuality. It established Nagata's trademark visual style of black and white drawings with pink screentones.

=== My Solo Exchange Diary, Volumes 1&2 ===
The sequel to My Lesbian Experience With Loneliness, My Solo Exchange Diary (Japanese: 一人交換日記, Hitori kōkan nikki), was published in Japanese later in the same year, 2016, and in English in 2018. While continuing to explore the themes of My Lesbian Experience With Loneliness, My Solo Exchange Diary is based on the concept of diary entries or letters that Nagata exchanges with her former and future self. Its second volume, titled My Solo Exchange Diary 2 (一人交換日記2) was released in Japanese in 2017 and in English in 2019.

=== My Alcoholic Escape from Reality ===
My Alcoholic Escape from Reality (現実逃避してたらボロボロになった話, Genjitsu tōhi shitetara boroboro ni natta hanashi, literally "a story of coming apart when I escaped from reality") deals with Nagata's alcoholism and subsequent hospitalization for pancreatitis. The manga was released in Japan in 2019 and in the United States of America in 2021.

=== My Wandering Warrior Existence ===
My Wandering Warrior Existence (迷走戦士・永田カビ, Meisou Senshi Nagata Kabi) is the fifth installment in the series of Nagata's autobiographical manga. It interrogates Nagata's longings for love and marriage. The manga was released in Japanese in 2020 and in English in 2022.

=== My Wandering Warrior Eating Disorder ===
In February 2021, Nagata started a new manga, My Wandering Warrior Eating Disorder (迷走戦士・永田カビ グルメでGO！, Meisо̄ Senshi Nagata Kabi: Gourmet de Go!) which deals with her eating disorder and wanting to eat excessively. Initially an ebook exclusive release, the manga was released in English in October 2023. An English print edition was released under the title My Twisted Eating Disorder in October 2025.

=== My Pancreas Broke, but My Life Got Better. ===
The follow-up to My Wandering Warrior Existence, My Pancreas Broke, but My Life Got Better (膵臓がこわれたら、少し生きやすくなりました。, Suizou ga Kowaretara, Sukoshi Iki Yasuku Narimashita.) is the seventh installment in the series and further delves into Nagata's alcoholism and how suffering pancreatitis led her to quit and try being healthier. It also deals with her experiences during the COVID-19 pandemic. The manga was released in Japanese in 2022 and was released in English in November 2023.

=== My Sketchy Roommate ===
In January 2026, Seven Seas Entertainment announced the license acquisition of another autobiographical manga by Nagata, My Sketchy Roommate (元らくがきとワンルーム暮らし, Moto Rakugaki to One Room Gurashi), following the mangaka as she copes with an imaginary roommate.

=== The Report On My Escape From The Hell Of Pushing Myself Too Hard ===
In December 2025, Nagata announced via X that her latest book, The Report On My Escape From The Hell Of Pushing Myself Too Hard (頑張りすぎ地獄から脱出しましたレポ, Ganbarisugi Jigoku kara Dasshutsu Shimashita Repo) was available for pre-order. It is an essay comic depicting the author's journey from pushing herself too hard—causing her spirit to break down and "send her to Hell"—until she recovers at her parents' home.

== Awards ==
In 2018, Nagata's My Lesbian Experience With Loneliness won both the Harvey Award for Best Manga and the Crunchyroll Anime Award for Best Manga.
