= Charles Rojzman =

French social psychologist

- Born: August 23, 1942
- Occupation: Author
- Writing career
- Genres: Social psychology, political science

Charles Rojzman (August 23, 1942) is a French social psychologist, author and an international leader in mediating racial, ethnic and intercultural conflicts throughout the world. He is the creator of a method, Transformational Social Therapy (TST), which has been applied to resolving intergroup violence and conflicts in France, Rwanda, Chechnya, Israel and elsewhere. He has written dozens of books, articles and book chapters and has been featured in documentaries and writings by others.

== Published works ==
- 1999 Freud the Humanist ISBN 1871871468
- 1999 How to Live Together : A New Way of Dealing with Racism and Violence with Sophie Pillods; with a foreword by Sophie Bibrowska ISBN 0958557616
- 2007 La Réconciliation, graphic novel with his daughter Théa Rojzman
