= Laika (comics) =

2007 graphic novel by Nick Abadzis

- Cover of Laika
- Date: 2007
- Publisher: First Second Books

Creative team
- Writers: Nick Abadzis
- Artists: Nick Abadzis
- ISBN: 1596431016

Laika is a graphic novel by British comics author Nick Abadzis, which gives a fictionalized account of the life and death of the eponymous dog, one of the first animals launched in orbital spaceflight.

Based on a true story, the graphic novel tells the story of Laika from multiple points of view: from that of the ambitious Sergey Korolyov, Chief Engineer responsible for the launching and construction of Sputnik 2; to that of Yelena Dubrovsky, official trainer of the space-bound dogs; to that of Oleg Gazenko, scientist; and finally from the viewpoint of Laika herself, who had lived as a stray on the streets of Moscow.

== Characters ==
=== Historical ===
- Laika/Kudryavka
- Nikita Sergeyevich Khrushchev (1894-1971) – Premier of the Soviet Union (1953-1964)
- Sergei Pavolovich Korolev (1907-1966) – the "Chief Designer of Rockets"; head of the Special Design Bureau 1 (OKB-1)
- Vasily Pavlovich Mishin (1917-2001) – Deputy Chief Designer of OKB-1
- Boris Evseyevich Chertok (1912-2011) – Head of Control Systems of the Special Design Bureau 1 (OKB-1)
- Academician Anatoli Arkadyevich Blagonravov (1894-1975) – Academician and Soviet space scientist; Chair of the State Commission Overseeing Biological Launches
- Dr. Vasily Vasilevich Parin (1903–1971) – Head of Physiology in the Institute of Therapy, USSR Academy of Medical Sciences
- Dr. Alexandr Dmitrievich Seryapin (1918–2009) – Biophysicist, Scientific Research Institute of Aviation Medicine
- Air Force Lieutenant Colonel Dr. Vladimir Ivanovich Yazdovsky (1913-1999) – Soviet space medicine scientist; head of the Biomedical Medicine Group at IBMP
- Air Force Captain Dr. Oleg Georgievich Gazenko (1918-2007) – Soviet space medicine scientist at IBMP

=== Fictional ===
- Tatiana – a maid; briefly adopted Laika
- Liliana – Tatiana's daughter
- Katya Korovina – Tatiana's cousin
- Mikhail Korovin – Laika's second owner, an ill-mannered boy.
- Mr. Korovin – Mikhail's father
- Gertruda – A stray; befriends Laika.
- Viktor and his wife – grocery-stall owners in a Moscow market
- Yelena Alexandrovna Dubrovsky – Head of IBMP department for canine training and handling

== Theme ==
Abadzis notes that his intention was to avoid anthropomorphism in portraying the central canine character. Thus Laika's traits of trust and eagerness to please are portrayed through her non-verbalised behaviour, and the reactions of the more sympathetic humans with whom she comes in contact. Mistreated as a young dog, Laika shows a need to gain human affection and approval that leads her through a harsh training regime to death in space. Even the empathetic Yelena accepts that animals will die in the space programme, though bitterly regretting that her "special dog" is the one to be sent with no hope of survival. Many of the incidents portrayed by Abadzis, such as Laika being taken home by a senior officer to play with his children shortly before the launch, are recorded as having actually occurred.

The graphic novel concludes with a real-life statement of regret by Oleg Gazenko, made in 1998: "Work with animals is a source of suffering to all of us. We treat them like babies who cannot speak. The more time passes, the more I'm sorry about it. We did not learn enough from the mission to justify the death of the dog".

== Reception ==
Laika was well-received, with the New York Press writing that Abadzis "has fashioned a poignant and accurate portrait of the lives Laika touched in the three years leading up to Sputnik II's launch. His characters — including the dog — are as real as the story he's telling: animated with complex personalities, flaws, humor and emotion." The Space Review called it "an entertaining but also educational overview of the life of an unwitting space pioneer", while another review states that "reading Laika is the sort of experience that you won't forget any time soon".

== Awards ==
- 2008:
  - Won for "Best Publication for Teens" Eisner Award
  - Nominated for "Best Reality-Based Work" Eisner Award
  - 2008 Young Adult Library Services Association "Top Ten Great Graphic Novels for Teens"
