= GB Tran =

American cartoonist and graphic designer

- Born: Gia-Bao Tran; United States
- Occupations: Graphic designer, cartoonist
- Writing career
- Notable work: Vietnamerica
- Notable awards: Society of Illustrators Gold Medal
- Website: gbtran.com

GB Tran is an American cartoonist and graphic designer. He is best known for his graphic novel, Vietnamerica, which won a Society of Illustrators Gold Medal and was included in Time's list of Top 10 Graphic Memoirs.

== Biography ==
GB Tran grew up in South Carolina with immigrant parents from Vietnam. During his childhood, he was largely indifferent to his background. In his late twenties, due to the deaths of his grandparents, he visited Vietnam for the first time and became more acquainted with his immigrant parents' and grandparents' history.

This experience inspired him to write Vietnamerica, a graphic novel depicting the struggles encountered by his grandparents in French Indochina and his parents during the Vietnam War and in their immigration to the United States. Vietnamerica was published in 2011.

Currently, GB Tran lives and works in the San Francisco Bay Area and teaches at California College of the Arts.

== List of works ==
- Vietnamerica (2011)
