= Oleg Gazenko =

Soviet scientist and general officer (1918–2007)

- Native name: Олег Георгиевич Газенко
- Born: 12 December 1918; Nikolaevka village, North Caucasian Soviet Republic, Russian SFSR
- Died: 17 November 2007 (aged 88) Moscow, Russia
- Allegiance: Soviet Union
- Service years: 1941–1988
- Rank: Lieutenant-general
- Conflicts: World War II; Korean War
- Awards: Order of Lenin

Oleg Georgievich Gazenko (Russian: Олег Георгиевич Газенко; 12 December 1918 – 17 November 2007) was a Russian military officer in the former Soviet Air Force and a program manager in the Soviet space program.

He headed the Institute of Biomedical Problems in Moscow and led a Soviet programme to train animals in space. Gazenko selected and trained Laika, the dog who flew on the 1957 Sputnik 2 mission.

== Early life and Second World War ==
Gazenko was born on December 12, 1918, in the village of Mykolaivka, Stavropol Territory to George and Larissa Gazenko, née Nikitin.

In 1941, Gazenko graduated from the Military Department of the 2nd Moscow Medical Institute as a medic 3rd rank (captain in the medical service). He and his whole class were immediately sent to the front. During the war, he served as the chief of an army hospital, 197th Battalion airfield services of the 15th Air Army in the West, South-Western, Bryansk, Baltic and Belorussian fronts, receiving several decorations for his service.

== Research for the Soviet Air Force ==
In 1946-1947, Gazenko received special training at the Military Medical Academy (Leningrad) in the department of physiology in the laboratory of Aviation Medicine, where, under the direct supervision of renowned physiologists – Academician Colonel-General Leon Orbeli and Professor Major General M. P. Brestkin – studied the problem and the state of high-altitude physiology of higher nervous activity in hypoxic conditions. During this time he married Olga Alexeevna Tolmachevskaya. Together they had two children – a son, Alexei, and daughter, Larissa.

In 1947, Gazenko was appointed to the Institute of Aviation Medicine of the Ministry of Defence. He was involved in studies of pilots in unfavourable climates—beyond the Arctic Circle and in deserts. Between 1948-1950 as the head of a medical research team, Gazenko took part in high-latitude Arctic air force tests "North Pole-2", "North Pole-3" and "North Pole-4". During this time he repeatedly worked on stations situated on drifting ice, as well as on the islands and the coast of the Arctic Ocean. Later he went on to conduct research on airmen working in difficult arid conditions of the Karakum Desert. Between 1951–1952 he served alongside Soviet airmen in the Korean War.

== Space research career ==
From 1955 Gazenko worked in the Soviet space program, focusing his efforts on research in the field of space biology and medicine relevant to weightlessness and orbital flight.

Gazenko took a prominent part in a number of biological tests regarding space flight projects. He trained and supervised the animals used in the Sputnik 2 project. Sputnik 2 was the second spacecraft launched into Earth orbit, on November 3, 1957, and the first to carry a living animal, a dog named Laika.

Gazenko continued his work as part of the team behind the Vostok program. He supervised and trained the animals used in the 1960 Vostok prototype flight. In the aftermath of its failure, he adopted a survivor of this flight – a small dog named Krasavka (Красавка, "Little Beauty") also known as Kometka (Кометка, "Little Comet"). Krasavka went on to have puppies and continued living with Gazenko and his family until her death 14 years later. Gazenko was also directly involved in training the first human cosmonauts of the Vostok 1 project, including Yuri Gagarin. Gagarin himself jokingly referred to it by saying: "I don't know whether I'm the first man in space, or the last dog in space."

In 1969, by the decision of the Central Committee of the CPSU and the Council of Ministers Gazenko was assigned to the 3rd General Directorate of the Ministry of Health as Director of the Institute of Medical and Biological Problems. His research of that period was focused on basic problems of space biomedicine. The study of the impact of zero gravity on living organisms allowed justification of the principles and methods of protecting humans from the unfavourable effects of space flight and creation of a system of supporting the health and productivity of space crews before, during, and after the flight. From 1978 Gazenko was involved in developing the system of physiological, health, and psychological measures for crews in prolonged space flights and after return to Earth.

He initiated the Cosmos biosatellite nonhuman primate program, which has been highly successful since its genesis in 1979. He recalls how difficult it was to decide to fly a primate for the first time. "It was obvious to us that we had to fly monkeys if we wanted to resolve the big questions about manned space flight. But our expertise was with other animals, like mice and dogs, so we didn't dare to fly monkeys for a long time." Close contacts with American primate researchers were valuable, Gazenko says. "They helped us to overcome the, well, let's say the mental barrier."

== Later life ==
Gazenko was elected president of the All-Union (now Russia) Physiological Society named Pavlov in 1987, and retired the following year with the rank of lieutenant-general in the medical services of the Soviet Air Force.

As a deputy of the USSR from 1989 to 1991, he was a member of the Committee on Science and Education of the Supreme Soviet of the USSR and of the commission that investigated the 1989 April 9 tragedy in Tbilisi.

Gazenko was an adviser to the Russian Academy of Sciences at the State Scientific Center of the Russian Federation "Institute of Biomedical Problems."

In 1998 Gazenko expressed regret for the manner of Laika's death:

"Work with animals is a source of suffering to all of us. We treat them like babies who cannot speak. The more time passes, the more I'm sorry about it. We shouldn't have done it. We did not learn enough from the mission to justify the death of the dog."

Until his death, he acted as an advisor to Anatoly Grigoriev, the current Director of the Institute. He had been appointed to the position of Academician in the Russian Academy of Science. Gazenko died on November 17, 2007; he is buried in the Troyekurovskoye Cemetery in Moscow.

== Publications ==
=== Books ===
- Animals in Space (1960)
- Life and Space (1961)
- Space Cardiology (1967)
- Mankind and Space (1987)

=== Journals ===
- Problems of Space Biology (since 1963, more than 80 volumes)
- Space Biology and Medicine in 1969
- Fundamentals of Space Biology and Medicine (in three volumes, 1975)

== Honors ==
- State Prize of the USSR (1978)
- Order of Lenin
- Gold Medal of Pavlov (1988)
- Order "For service to the Fatherland Order" IV Degree (1998)
- Demidov Prize (1998)
