= Marzi: A Memoir =

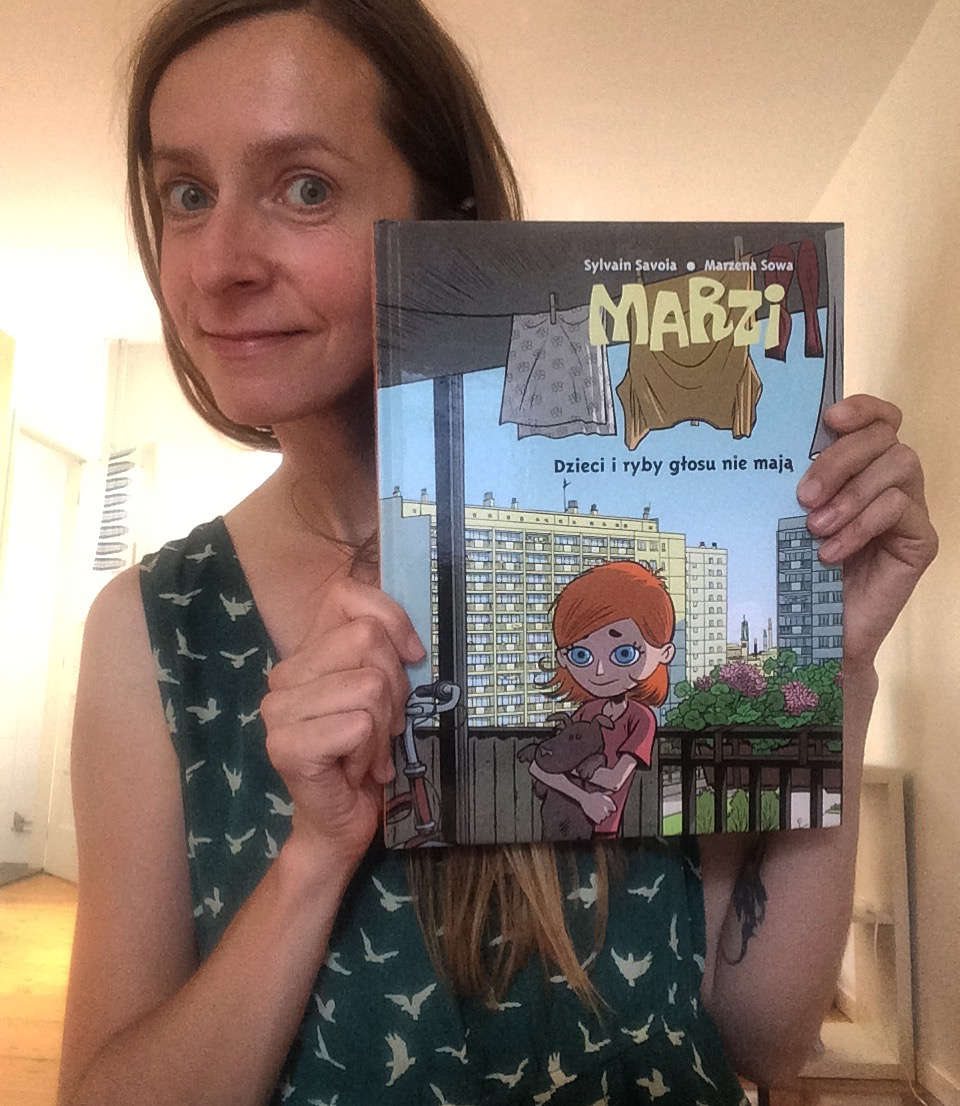
Marzena Sowa pictured holding a Polish copy of her memoir Marzi

Marzi: A Memoir is a comic written by Marzena Sowa and drawn by Sylvain Savoia. It was originally published in French by Dupuis.

The English version is published by DC Comics/Vertigo Comics. Anjali B. Singh translated the text into English, with Joseph Howard Ketterer doing lettering.

It is about the author's childhood in Cold War Poland.

The book's name is that of the main character and the story is told from her perspective.

== Reviews ==
Publishers Weekly wrote that Marzi "subtly invokes a comparison between the place of the children in society and that of the oppressed under authoritarian regimes."

Dariusz Vanhonnaeker, in Slavica bruxellensia, wrote that the perspective of the character was "Perspicace et spontané" (perceptive and spontaneous).
