= My Lesbian Experience with Loneliness =

Japanese autobiographical manga series

- Cover art, featuring Nagata (right) and Yuka (left)

さびしすぎてレズ風俗に行きましたレポ (Sabishisugite Rezu Fūzoku ni Ikimashita Repo)
- Genre: Autobiography, yuri
- Manga
- Written by: Kabi Nagata
- Published by: East Press
- English publisher: NA: Seven Seas Entertainment
- Published: June 17, 2016

My Lesbian Experience with Loneliness (Japanese: さびしすぎてレズ風俗に行きましたレポ, Hepburn: Sabishisugite Rezu Fūzoku ni Ikimashita Repo; lit. 'A Report on Being So Lonely That I Went to a Lesbian Brothel') or The Private Report on My Lesbian Experience with Loneliness is a Japanese autobiographical manga written and illustrated by Nagata Kabi. It was originally published by Nagata on the art website Pixiv. The manga was published in Japanese as a single print volume by East Press in June 2016, and in English by Seven Seas Entertainment in June 2017, with the English version winning the Harvey Award for Best Manga of 2018.

The manga was well received by critics, one of whom called it a counterpoint to the "yuri fantasies" common to the genre, and was included on several lists of the best comics of the year, including the annual Kono Manga ga Sugoi! list. A sequel, My Solo Exchange Diary, was released in Japan in December 2016, and in English in June 2018. A third installment, My Solo Exchange Diary Volume 2, was released in English in February 2019. Another sequel, My Alcoholic Escape from Reality, was released in Japan in November 2019, and in English in May 2021.

== Synopsis ==
The manga is an autobiography following Kabi Nagata, a young woman, exploring subjects such as her mental health, her exploration of her sexuality, and her experience with growing up. Her experiences provide context to why she chose to lose her virginity to a female sex worker.

== Production and publication ==
My Lesbian Experience with Loneliness was written and drawn by Kabi Nagata, with art colored in a two-tone palette. According to Nagata, she does not hesitate to expose her private life for the sake of creating interesting content for a manga, despite being more reserved when speaking to people in person. She decided to do this because of a lack of work after she had become a manga artist, thinking that the only way for her to create something interesting that could earn her a living was to base her creation on her own experiences. The writing process involved her writing down things that have happened to her, and her feelings, in the form of a bulleted list, and rearranging the items to form a narrative. When writing, she strove towards neither lowering or glorifying herself, to avoid spreading too negative feelings and making readers unable to relate to the stories. She said that there were some things she "couldn't touch on" in the manga, that she would like to use in a future work.

Nagata originally published the manga on the Japanese art website Pixiv; it was later published by East Press in one print volume on June 17, 2016. For the printed volume, extra story material was added, and the art throughout the manga was revised. Seven Seas Entertainment announced in October 2016 that they had acquired the license for the manga, and released it on June 6, 2017, in North America, in a single volume, and digitally a day later through ComiXology. A sequel, My Solo Exchange Diary, was published by Shogakukan in Japan on December 10, 2016, and in English by Seven Seas Entertainment on June 5, 2018. Nagata's third work in this series, My Solo Exchange Diary Volume 2, was published in English by Seven Seas Entertainment on February 12, 2019. Her fourth work, My Alcoholic Escape from Reality, was published in Japan on November 7, 2019, and was published in English by Seven Seas Entertainment on May 11, 2021. Since that time, she has also produced My Wandering Warrior Existence, My Pancreas Broke but I'm Doing Better, and My Wandering Warrior Eating Disorder.

== Reception ==
The manga was well received by critics. The publishing company Takarajimasha listed My Lesbian Experience with Loneliness as the third best manga of the year for women in the 2017 incarnation of their yearly Kono Manga ga Sugoi! top-twenty list, after Kin no Kuni Mizu no Kuni and Haru no Noroi. It won The Anime Awards 2017 in the "Manga of the Year" category, both Publishers Weekly and Amazon listed it as one of the best comics of 2017, Teen Vogue included it on their list of the "best queer books to celebrate Pride 2017", and comic creator Tillie Walden included it in a Bookish article about "must-read" LGBTQ comics. It won a Harvey Award in the "Best Manga" category.

The Japanese newspaper Fukui Shimbun liked the manga, and said that Nagata's thoughts remained with them after having finished reading it. The entertainment news site Natalie also enjoyed it, calling it a "breathtaking essay". Ana Valens of The Mary Sue cited it as a work that goes against the typical yuri fantasy themes in yuri works by exploring realistic emotional and mental dynamics in lesbian relationships, and said that the events leading up to Nagata's meeting with the sex worker "shed a new light on how we can think about yuri". Heidi MacDonald at The Beat called it "an irresistible memoir" and perfect for young readers also dealing with identity and acceptance issues. Judith Utz of Teen Vogue described it as "moving and honest", and relatable for everyone who has doubted themselves. Mey Valdivia Rude of Autostraddle hailed it as "the best book I've read all year", commending Nagata's rawness and honesty.

My Lesbian Experience with Loneliness was the second best selling comic of its debut week in North America, according to the weekly Nielsen BookScan graphic novel sales charts, after Bitch Planet volume 2. It also appeared on the monthly BookScan chart for June 2017, in eleventh place.
