= Caitlin Cass =

American cartoonist

Caitlin Cass (she/they) is a cartoonist and installation artist. Her work focuses on systemic failure throughout history. Cass has been published in The New Yorker, The Lily, and The Nib. They were a 2018 NYSCA/NYFA Artist Fellow in Fiction and in 2024 Nebraska Arts Council Fellow in Non-Fiction.

== Education ==
Cass received her bachelor's in Liberal Arts from St. John's College, Santa Fe in 2009, before going on to get an MFA in Studio Art from the University at Buffalo in 2012.

== Career ==
Since 2009, Cass has published a bi-monthly comics periodical called The Great Moments in Western Civilization Postal Constituent. The comic is made up of historical episodes that Cass describes as highlighting instances of “failing systems and irrational hope.”

After receiving her MFA, Cass joined the art faculty at the Buffalo Seminary, a private, all-girl school.

In 2020, Cass held a solo exhibition, entitled "Women's Work: Suffrage Movements 1848-1965", which was awarded a grant from the National Endowment for the Arts. She had been approached by the curator of the Burchfield Penney Art Center, who was interested in having her create illustrations to commemorate the centennial of the 19th Amendment.

As of 2026, Cass is an associate professor of Studio Art, Illustration and Time-Based Media at the University of Nebraska Omaha.

Her first full-length non-fiction graphic history, Suffrage Song: The Haunted History of Gender, Race and Voting Rights in the U.S. was published by Fantagraphics in 2024. The book covers the history of the US women's suffrage movement and women in the civil rights movement. In 2025 it won the Eisner Award for Best Reality-Based Work.

== Personal life ==
Cass is originally from River Forest, Illinois.

== Selected works ==
- The Great Moments in Western Civilization Postal Constitutiant (2009–present, self-published)
- Women's Work: Suffrage Movements 1848-1965) (2020, graphic novel/ exhibition catalog, Burchfield Penney Art Center)
- Alchemy and Control (2022, Inks: The Journal of the Comics Studies Society)
- Suffrage Song: The Haunted History of Gender, Race and Voting Rights in the U.S. (2024, Fantagraphics)

== Solo exhibitions ==
- Towers, 2013, Olean Public Library, Olean, NY
- The Museum of Failure, 2014, Hartnett Gallery, Rochester, NY
- Rathbun Builds Buffalo, 2015, The Fargo House, Buffalo, NY; Buffalo Place Storefront, Buffalo, NY
- Myths and Maxims, 2018, Argus Gallery, Buffalo, NY
- The Postal Constituent: A Ten Year Study, 2019, Western New York Book Arts Center, Buffalo, NY
- Women’s Work: Suffrage Movements 1848-1965, 2020, The Burchfield Penney Art Center, Buffalo, NY
