= Macedonia (comics) =

Autobiographical comic book

Publication information
- Publisher: Villard (Random House)
- Publication date: June 2007

Creative team
- Written by: Harvey Pekar; Heather Roberson
- Artist: Ed Piskor

Macedonia is a biographical comic book, published in June 2007 by Villard. It was written by Harvey Pekar and Heather Roberson, and illustrated by Ed Piskor. The book is based on Roberson's travels through Macedonia (now North Macedonia).

== Plot ==
Macedonia opens with Heather Roberson, a student of Peace and Conflict Studies at the University of California at Berkeley, arguing with a professor about the inevitability of war. Roberson argues that it is avoidable, while the professor argues that it is not. Roberson cites Macedonia, which avoided war unlike other former states of Yugoslavia, as an example. Roberson decides to make this the subject of her thesis, and travels to Macedonia to carry out her research.

Once inside the country, Roberson sees the tense relationship between the majority Macedonians and the Albanians, the largest minority. She travels to the cities of Belgrade (in Serbia), Skopje, and Tetovo, conducting interviews with an ombudsman, professors, and a police trainer.

== Production ==
=== Inspiration ===
Roberson was inspired to start on the project as a result of an argument with a professor about the inevitability of war. She wanted to know what had saved Macedonia from war while other former Yugoslav states were at war following the breakup of the country. As Roberson stated:

It started with an argument I couldn't win. I was a student of Peace and Conflict at the University of California at Berkeley, and one day this Political Science professor really laid into me. He said I was wasting my time. He said that war was inevitable.

=== Collaboration ===
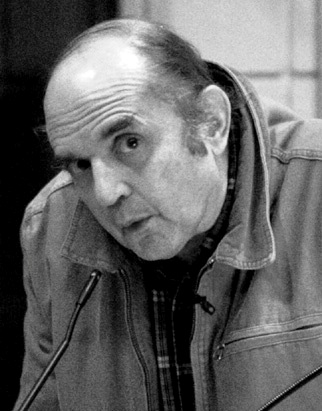
Harvey Pekar in 2008.

Roberson was in her hometown in Missouri, stopping there before going to Macedonia to carry out research for her thesis when she met Pekar. Pekar was there on the invitation of Roberson's sister, speaking at a showing of American Splendor, a film based on his comics. Roberson described her project to Pekar, who expressed interest in collaborating on a comic book. Pekar suggested Roberson take notes during her trip, which he would then use to construct the script. He expected material enough a short story, but ultimately ended up with 150 pages of story. Describing the collaboration, Pekar said "It was one of the best working relationships I've ever had". Pekar would create preliminary drawings of each page, then passed them on to illustrator Piskor in Pittsburgh.

== Reception ==
Macedonia received mixed reviews. Rain Taxi praised the book’s "integrity and rigor" while observing that it sometimes "sags under the weight of its relentless wordiness and intellectual distance." A review at Sequart characterized Macedonia as an ambitious but uneven departure for Pekar, praising its intellectual scope while suggesting that his more analytical, explanatory approach resulted in a less immediate and engaging narrative.

Booklist felt the Pekar had "skillfully prepared the book’s text and basic layout", but complained that Piskor's illustration was "stiff". Other reviewers, however, responded positively to Piskor's illustration, citing its "stylish, crisp feel". Some reviewers complained that the text overwhelmed the illustrations, leading it to feel more like a "lecture" than a graphic novel.
