= Théa Rojzman =

French comics artist, illustrator, painter and writer

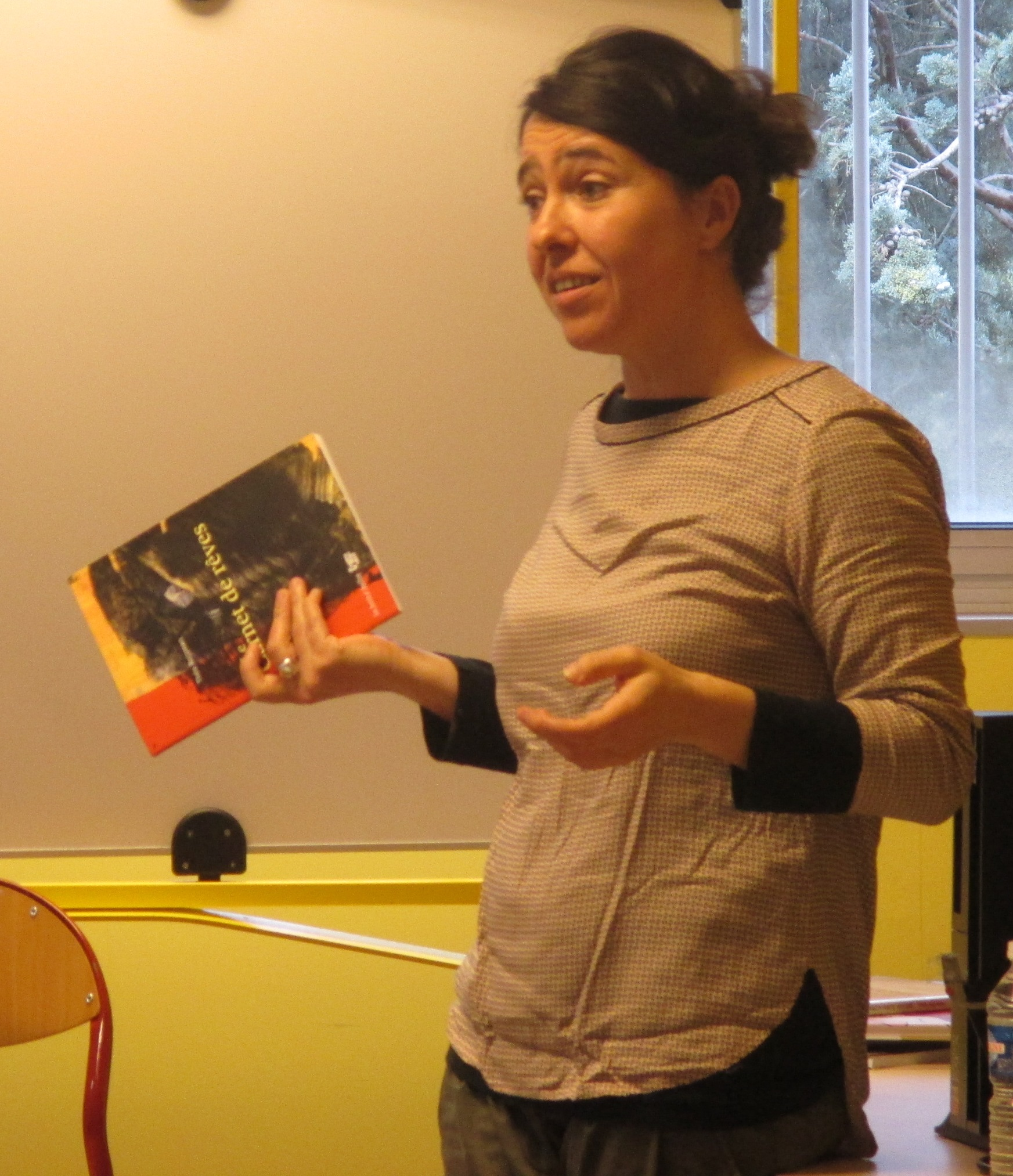
- Born: 1974 (age 51–52)
- Known for: Comics artist, painter, illustrator
- Notable work: Mourir (ça n'existe pas)
- Website: http://thearojzman.free.fr/

Théa Rojzman (born 1974) is a French comics artist, illustrator, painter and writer.

== Biography ==
Théa Rojzman studied in philosophy and social therapy alongside her life as an artist. She presented her work in a number of exhibitions and illustrated collections. She combined her two principle passions, writing and painting, in contemporary comics. Between 2007 and 2010, she published three comic strips, one of which, La Réconciliation, she co-wrote with her father, Charles Rojzman.

In 2016 Rojzman was awarded a special mention in the Artémisia Award, for Mourir (ça n'existe pas). The work draws on Rojzman's training in therapy, exploring childhood loss and anxieties.

Her book Émilie voit quelqu'un, with designer Anne Rouquette, was voted the top comic of 2015 by readers of the magazine Les Inrockuptibles.
