= Marzena Sowa =

Polish cartoonist

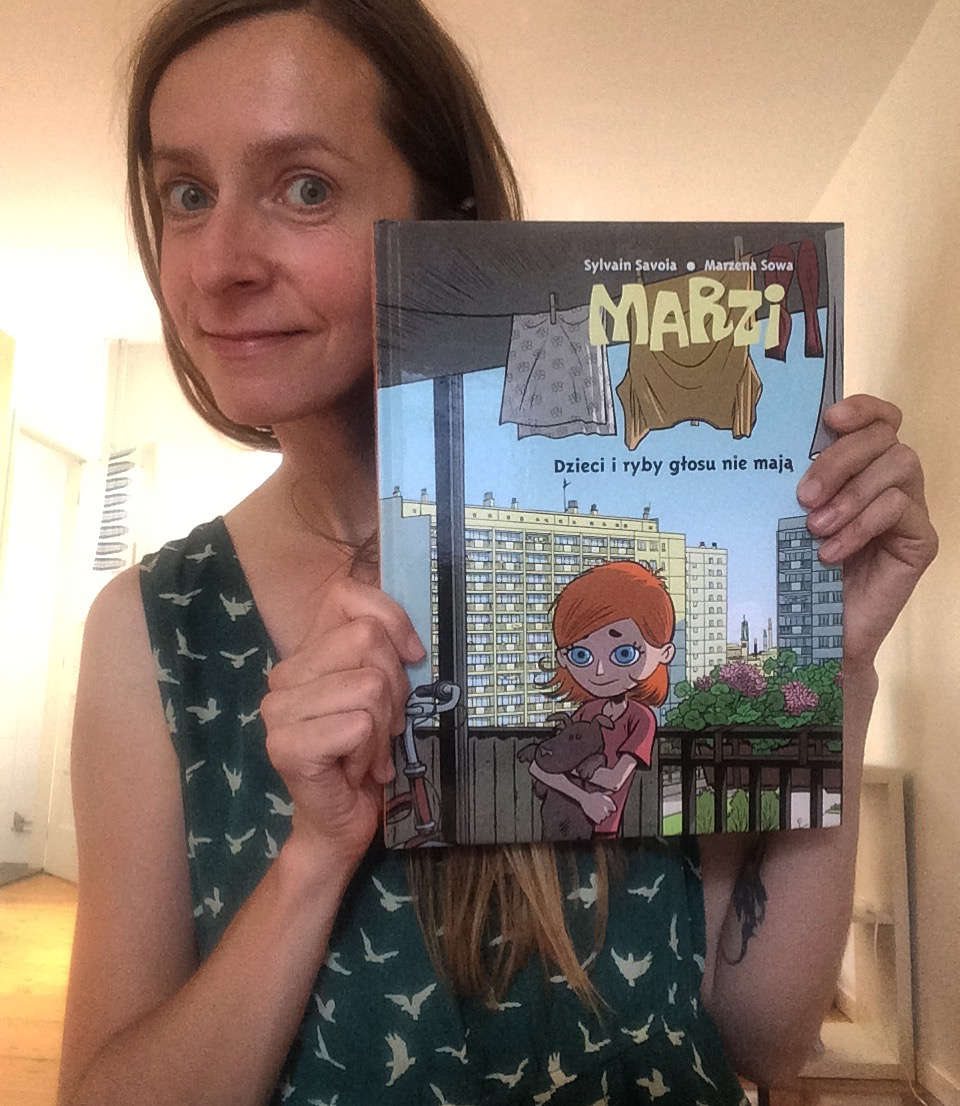
Marzena Sowa with a Polish copy of her autobiographical comics, Marzi.

Marzena Sowa (born 1979 in Stalowa Wola) is a Polish cartoonist. Since 2001, she has been living in France. Sowa studied at the Jagiellonian University in Kraków and then at the Michel de Montaigne University Bordeaux 3 in Bordeaux.

Sowa is the author of the autobiographical comic Marzi, a series of comics about her childhood in 1980s-era Poland. She writes about life under communism, food shortages, and her childish escapades. The illustrator is Sylvain Savoia, Sowa's life partner. So far, six volumes of Marzi have been published by comic book publisher Dupuis. In Poland, the first three volumes were collected and published by Egmont. Marzi is also translated into Spanish, in 2011 into English and in 2012 into Czech.

== Books ==
- Marzi:
  - Petite Carpe, vol. 1, Dupuis, 2005
  - Sur la terre comme au ciel, vol. 2, Dupuis, 2006
  - Rezystor, vol. 3, Dupuis, 2007
  - Le Bruit des villes, vol. 4, Dupuis, 2008 (tirage de tête, Éditions de la Gouttière, 2008)
  - Pas de liberté sans solidarité, vol. 5, Dupuis, 2009
  - Tout va mieux..., vol. 6, Dupuis, 2011
  - Nouvelle vague, vol.7, Dupuis, 2017
  - La Pologne vue par les yeux d'une enfant (complete volume 1), Dupuis, 2008
  - Une enfant en Pologne (complete volume 2), Dupuis, 2009
  - Nouveau souffle (complete volume 3), Dupuis, 2017
