= Pixiv =

Japanese online artist community

- Screenshot of Pixiv's homepage in 2025
- Website type: Artist community, SNS
- Available in: Japanese, Chinese, English, Korean
- Headquarters: Shibuya, Tokyo, Japan
- Owner: Pixiv Inc.
- Creators: Takahiro Kamitani; Takanori Katagiri
- Website: www.pixiv.net
- IPv6 support: No
- Commercial: Yes
- Registration: Optional
- Launched: September 10, 2007; 19 years ago
- Current status: Active
- Written in: PHP

Pixiv is a Japanese online community for artists. It was first launched as a beta test on September 10, 2007, by Takahiro Kamitani and Takanori Katagiri. Pixiv Inc. is headquartered in Sendagaya, Shibuya, Tokyo, Japan.

As of January 2024, the site consists of over 100 million members, over 115 million illustration and manga and over 21 million novel works posted. Pixiv aims to provide a place for artists to exhibit their illustrations and get feedback via a rating system and user comments. Works are organized in an extensive tag structure which forms the backbone of the website.

== History ==
Previous logo from 2008 to 2025

Starting as the idea of the programmer Takahiro Kamitani, who is himself an artist known as Bakotsu on the website, Pixiv was launched on September 10, 2007, as a beta test. When the number of users exceeded 10,000 only nineteen days after launch, it became difficult for Kamitani to maintain Pixiv on his own, leading him to establish Crooc Inc. on 1 October 2007.

The website underwent a major upgrade on 18 December 2007, into what is similar to the current version of the website. While the website was originally only available in Japanese, Chinese was the first additional language offered due to an increasing tendency of international registrants from Taiwan and China; there is also an increasing number of registrants from the United States and South Korea.

In 2009, an English-language version was considered to be the lowest in terms of priority, but was later established in early 2011. Internationalization of the website continued with the addition of French, Korean, Russian and Thai. Certain European countries with a high number of hits on the website such as Germany, Italy and France will also be considered. The management company Crooc changed its name to Pixiv Inc. on November 1, 2008. The CEO of Pixiv Inc. is Takanori Katagiri.

Pixiv introduced a redesigned logo in 2025, replacing the existing logo used since 2008.

== Characteristics ==
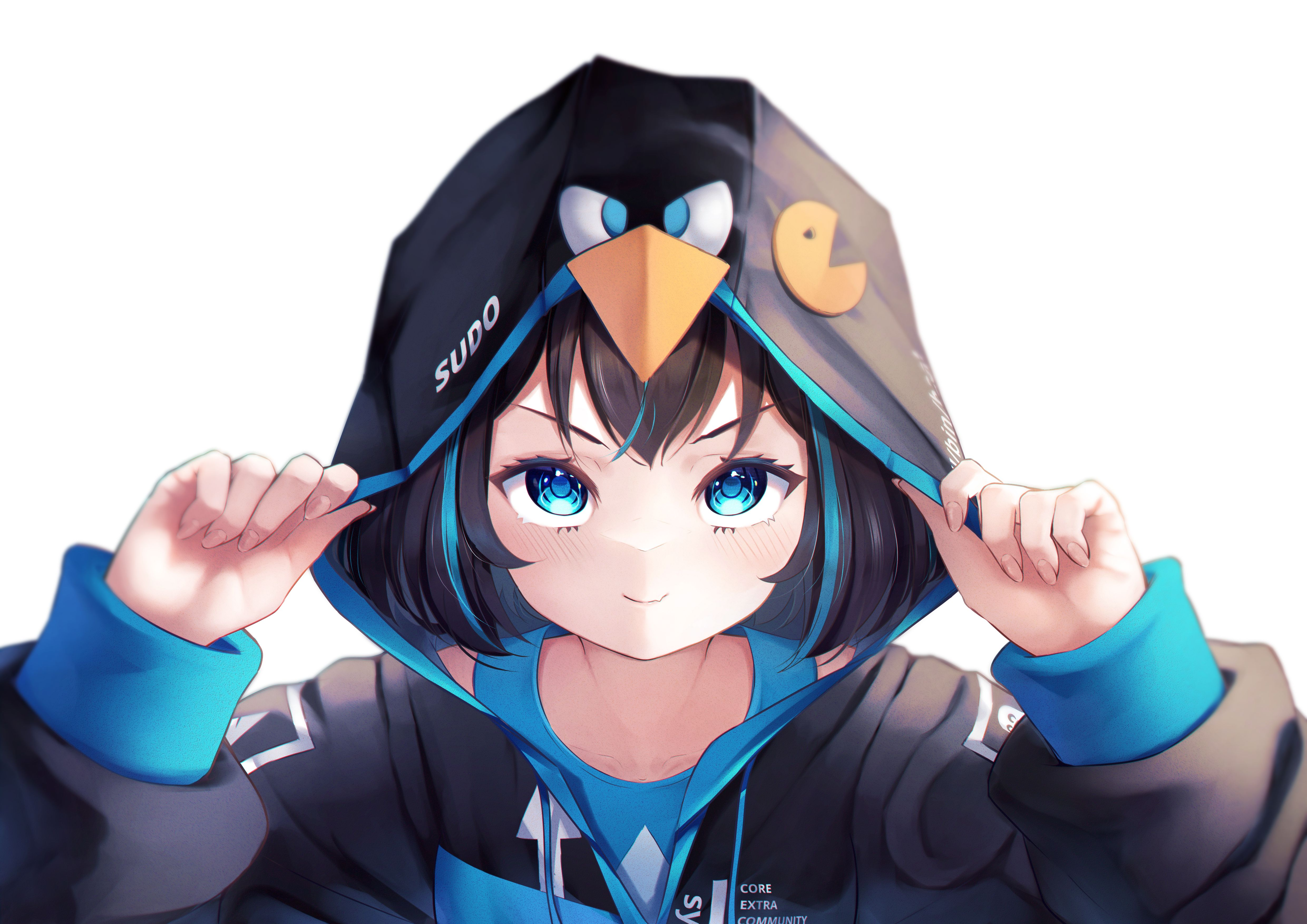
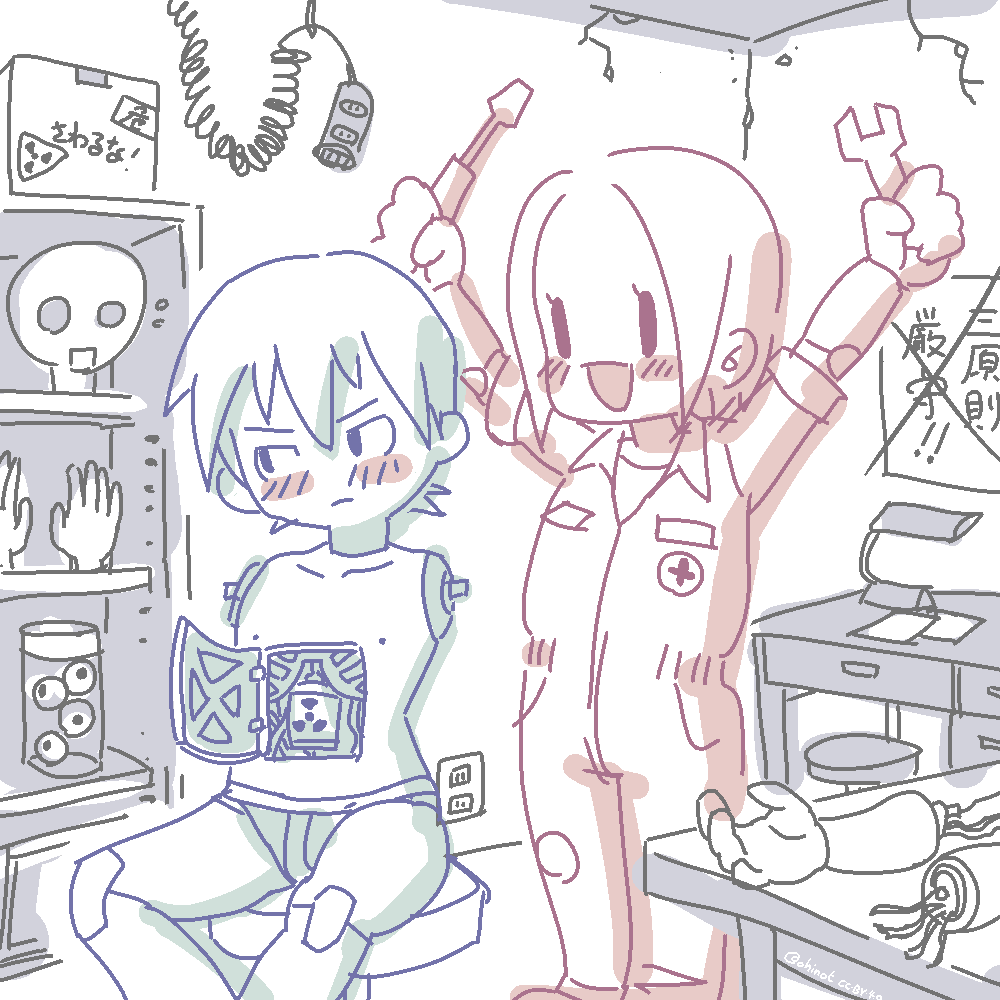
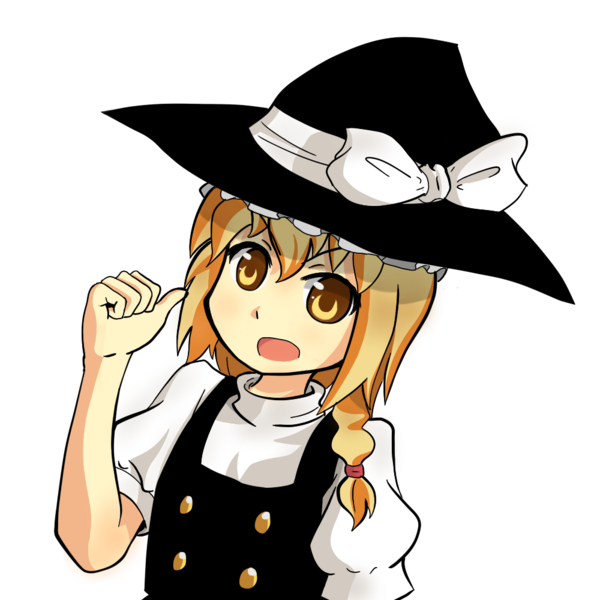
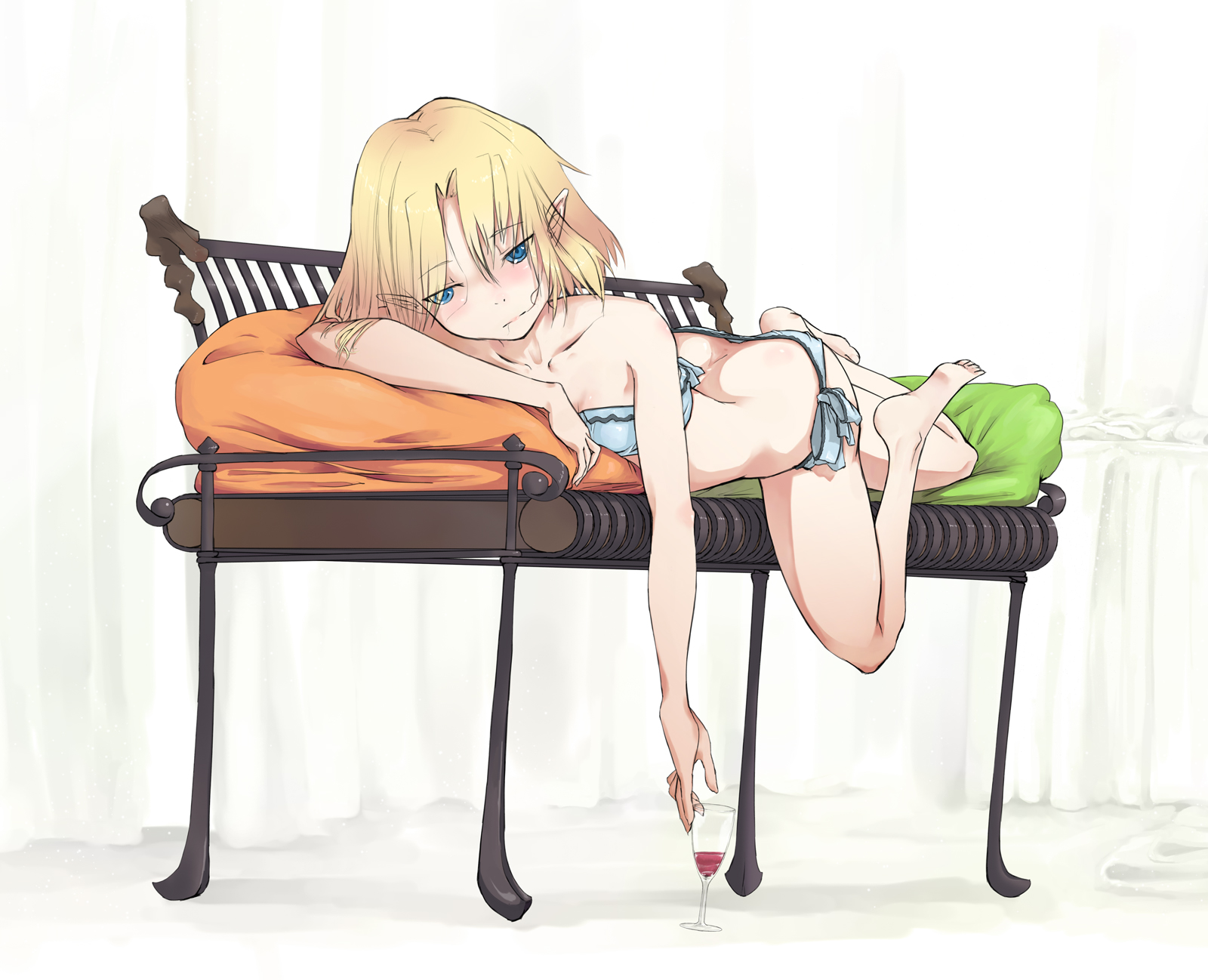
Example illustrations from Pixiv

A free membership is required in order to browse the website. Pixiv's main concept is for users to submit their own art illustrations, which excludes most forms of photography; creative writing can also be submitted. Users can participate in a social network where one can rate contributions, leave comments on art pieces, and change tags on any entry.

Due to the flexibility of tags, users can start impromptu user-generated participation events where users submit art related to a common specific subject. Each user has a personal bulletin board system where other users can leave messages. One can also respond to images with another image, known as an "image response".

Pixiv differentiates itself from its most notable American counterpart, DeviantArt, in that it permits hardcore pornography to be posted on the site, albeit with genitals censored so as to conform with Japanese obscenity laws. Images such as these, or other images not suitable for children such as grotesque images, are separated from the other content through two filters which can be turned on or off via the user's profile. Both of these filters, the first preventing the user from seeing any adult content and the second hiding grotesque ("R18-G") content, are enabled by default and as such unregistered users cannot view adult works. The majority of contributions are of anime, manga, and video game fan art, or of original art which resembles these art forms. The website's global policy includes protecting the privacy of all Pixiv users, and refraining from posting others' works, reprinting others' works without permission, and advertising for commerce.

The current English slogan is "It's fun drawing!" but earlier versions used a literal translation of the Japanese slogan Oekaki ga motto tanoshiku naru basho (お絵かきがもっと楽しくなる場所) as "A place where drawing becomes more enjoyable." This explains the subtitle "Pixiv, the online artist's community, aims to be that place."

=== Formal events ===
Formal events are periodically held on Pixiv to gather participation in formal events revolving around a common theme depending on the time of year; these events revolve around the user-submitted artwork. Throughout the year, seasonal events occur, such as tie-ins with the holidays Halloween, Christmas, New Years, and Tanabata. For a fixed period of time, a section of the website is dedicated to these seasonal submissions, and aspects of the website such as the logo design and star-rating system are altered; for example, the stars are pumpkins during the Halloween-tie in event. On and thereafter the Tanabata event in mid-2008, prizes are offered by either sponsors or from Pixiv itself for participants in the event whose art proves to be popular with the community. Other than during seasonal events, sponsors can also work with Pixiv on PR events, again offering prizes to the users with the most popular works. Pixiv has held an event called "Doodle 4 Pixiv", an event inspired by Google's Doodle4Google competition where participating members take the Pixiv logo and modify it in some way.

Before the Comiket 73 convention in December 2007, users set up a "Pixiv Edition C73 Catalog" on the website via the tags on the images, and following this Pixiv began setting up a section of the website for members participating at Comiket starting in preparation for Comiket 74 in August 2008. This enables users to search through a catalog by dōjin circles and by username which also includes information on where in the convention center a user's circle is located. Along the same lines, due to the high level of Touhou Project fan art contributions to the website (about 3.9% of all submissions), Pixiv also sets up a similar catalog for the annual Reitaisai Touhou convention.

== Features ==
=== Top page ===
When the top page of Pixiv is viewed when not logged in, a random selection of the newest highly rated contributions to the website are previewed as thumbnails. A set of tags from the most recent submissions is shown in a tag cloud under the illustrations. When logged in, six of the newest illustrations are previewed at the top, and several top-three rankings are shown including daily, popular among men, rookie, and original for illustrations, and a daily ranking for written contributions. Other rankings not on the top page include weekly, monthly, and popular among women. Tag clouds are displayed, as well as official events and new illustrations from favorited artists. A random selection of a user's favorite artists, linking to their user pages, can be viewed under the user's profile image on the left. Two links are available to a user to review their past evaluations and comments left on images. A link to go to the adult version of the top page is available as well, if enabled in the settings.

=== User pages ===
On a given user's user page, the user's three most-recent submissions are previewed as thumbnails, along with the user's three most recently bookmarked images, and the three most-recent image responses by the user who responded to another user's submissions. A selection of a user's favorite artists is available, with links to the full lists of artists divided between "favorite users" and "my picks". A short profile detailing the artist's basic information, such as nickname, birthday, sex, and location, is available, along with a short self-introduction. An additional profile detailing an artist's computer workspace is also available. Each user has a profile image used to distinguish the artist which appears above their username on their user page. Each user is given a simple, personal BBS which the user, or anyone else, can write comments on with a limit of 140 characters, and only the 60 most-recent entries are available for viewing.

=== Submissions ===
A user can submit an unlimited number of images, though a user must wait five minutes between submissions. When searching for contributions, the number of users who bookmarked a given image will appear under the thumbnail as "# users" in blue, and the number of users who gave an image response to a given image will also appear under the thumbnail as "# res" in red. If a submitted image is larger than 600x600 pixels, the image will appear as a 600-pixel length image on the image's page which, when clicked, will open up a new browser window or tab containing the full image. It is possible for a user to evaluate each submission once per 24-hour period with a scale of star-shaped icons from one to ten (low to high). The number of times an image has been evaluated, the sum score, and the number of times an image has been viewed are posted above the stars. A summary of the image written by the artist appears above the image with its title.

It is possible to make a short comment on an image with a limit of 140 characters; the 20 most-recent comments are posted, and it is possible for a user to delete their own comments. A set of tags are attached to each image which can be edited by any Pixiv user, and any tag can be added, even overly specific tags containing full sentences; however, only ten tags per image are allowed. If a submission received an image response, the five most-recent image responses are previewed as thumbnails under the comment input line with a link to the full list of image responses. Previews of submissions can be embedded into other websites such as blogs which link back to the image's page on Pixiv.

=== Tags ===
Tags are an important feature of Pixiv which enable images to be grouped together in common themes and subjects. While each image is only allowed ten tags, the artist who posted a given image can choose which tags to lock or unlock; if a given tag is unlocked, any user can remove or alter the tag. Any user can add in additional tags, and it is possible to report any unpleasant or defamatory tags. A section of the website contains a list of the top 5,000 used tags on the website, with the most-used tags at the top; the two most-used tags are "Touhou" (Note: This refers to the Japanese tag, "東方".) and "original" with over 1 million submissions each. Another section of the website lists the number of users who have images with common tags; for example, the "original" tag is used the most by users. There are advanced search options to search for images by size, aspect ratio, and tools used.

=== Favorites ===
It is possible to bookmark favorite images and have them easily available for viewing via a user's user page. The bookmarks are organized by tags, and a short comment on the image can be added by the bookmarker. The number of images one can bookmark is unrestricted, and the images are listed by either newest-first or oldest-first. The images bookmarked by a user are available for any user to view. A user can add other users to their "favorite users", which can either be public or private, and are listed by most-recently added. A user can add their friends as "my picks" (or "my Pixiv") which is shown in a public listing organized by the order in which the members joined Pixiv starting with the earliest.

=== Pixiv Premium ===
Launched on April 1, 2009, users can pay a fee of 525 yen per month to obtain an upgraded account known as Pixiv Premium. Users with premium accounts are given various special privileges, such as trying new services earlier than other members, sorting search results by popularity, and getting preferential treatment in the events organized through the website.

Premium users are given 2,000 Pixiv Points (abbreviated pp) per month, which users give to others they like and support via a "goodP" button visible on each user's user page. It is possible to send anywhere between 10 and 500 points at a time. A third party not related to the exchange of points between two users will not be aware any points were exchanged; they are meant as a private feature between two users to show thanks or gratitude. If any points gained within any 30-day period are not used in one year's time, the points expire. There are plans to use the points to exchange them for original Pixiv goods.

=== Event community ===
Premium members can make use of the event community portion of the website which allows users to organize events off-site. Only premium users can organize the events, but any Pixiv member can view the events in a public calendar, and any member can join any of the events. All of the events are for members of Pixiv to meet offline in user-organized events to showcase art, dōjinshi, or anything else Pixiv-related. Events can only be planned up to three months in advance, and each premium member can only organize one event at a time, though can join however many one wishes. Only Pixiv-related events can be organized in the event community, and if any event which is found to be unsuitable will be removed. Up to three people can be given co-managerial status on Pixiv for an event.

=== Other ===
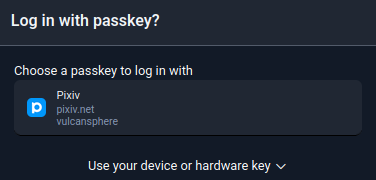
Passwordless authentication with passkey for Pixiv (with Bitwarden)

The search feature on the website enables a user to search for images via their tags, or by their titles and captions. A random-tag search feature is available, which excludes the adult images, where a set of forty images are displayed as thumbnails.Users can be found via a specific search feature which searches for matches with users' profiles. It is possible to message other users with a 10–10,000 character limit. A mobile phone version of the website is available called Pixiv Mobile or Pikumoba (ピクモバ) for short.

Pixiv supports passwordless authentication (using WebAuthn passkey) for login without password.

== Exhibitions ==
=== Pixiv Festa ===
Between February 27 and March 1, 2009, Pixiv held their first convention, Pixiv Festa, at the East Design Festa Gallery in Omotesandō, Tokyo, Japan. The event consisted of several exhibitions by 145 different artists. Participants could freely interact with the art exhibits in the three ways one can interact on the website: via rating an image from one to ten (low to high) stars, making comments about an image, or having the ability to change tags on any entry. Participants were given a set of gold star-shaped stickers which they could place below any of the art pieces, showing their satisfaction or lack thereof by not placing any stars. Each of the art pieces was hung with a comment book that people could write anything they wanted in, critiquing the art pieces. Finally, participants were given a set of blank tags that they could write anything they wanted on, and attach below a given art piece; each art piece had ten spots to place tags on.

Further attractions included an area where participants could draw art pieces and get feedback from others, and a "Pixiv Zone" on the second floor which contained an exhibit chronicling the 1 1/2-year history of Pixiv. Each participant was also given a quiz sheet regarding Pixiv trivia whose answers could be found in the Pixiv Zone. People who completed the quiz, and got at least twenty-five of thirty questions correct would receive special gifts while supplies lasted. The second Pixiv Festa convention was held in the same place between July 11–12, 2009. For the third Pixiv Festa held between June 12–13, 2010, both the East and West Design Festa Galleries were used for the convention. The fourth Pixiv Festa was held between October 16–17, 2010.

=== Pixiv Market ===
Pixiv held an event called Pixiv Market on November 15, 2009, at the Tokyo Big Sight in Ariake, Tokyo, Japan. The event was similar to Comiket where participants were able to sell and distribute their works of art, whether they were single illustrations or entire dōjinshi. The application period for Pixiv Premium members was held between July 31 and August 12, 2009, and the application period for regular Pixiv members was held between August 25 and September 10, 2009. About 200 booths were set up for the event.

== Additional services and media ==
In addition to the website Pixiv, Pixiv Inc. began to develop the idea of expanding Pixiv beyond its website's boundaries while being able to use a user's Pixiv account for other peripheral services. In October 2008, Pixiv Inc. launched an oekaki Internet forum called Drawr, which anyone with a Pixiv account can use. The website uses a Flash-based system to enable users to draw art via a web application. Other users can submit art replies to any art piece; there is no interface for text entry. Unlike Pixiv, there is no search feature as there are no tags available, and it is not required to sign-up or login to Drawr to browse the entries. On Drawr, users can create threads where users submit art on a common theme, or add to the image which started the thread. In collaboration with Livedoor, a blogging service called Pixiv Blog was launched on April 23, 2009, which anyone with a Pixiv account can use. An oekaki chat service called Pixiv Chat was launched on December 15, 2009, for users to draw oekaki art while in a chat room.

=== DrawTwit ===
In collaboration with Twitter, Pixiv Inc. launched a web service in July 2009 called DrawTwit, which anyone with a Twitter account can use and allows users to draw artwork and post them to Twitter. Others can comments on the artwork with either writing a 110-character limit or drawing a 140-brush stroke limit image response (in the same spirit as Twitter's limit of 140 characters per tweet). DrawTwit was originally a temporary service available during maintenance of the Pixiv website on July 16, 2009, but the service proved popular enough to develop into its own entity.

=== Pixiv Encyclopedia ===
Pixiv Encyclopedia
- Native name: ピクシブ百科事典
- Website type: Online encyclopedia
- Available in: 2 languages
- List of languages Japanese, English
- Headquarters: Japan
- Owner: Pixiv Inc.
- Website: dic.pixiv.net (in Japanese) dic.pixiv.net/en/ (in English)
- Commercial: Yes
- Registration: Optional
- Launched: November 10, 2009; 17 years ago
- Current status: Active

Pixiv Encyclopedia (Japanese: ピクシブ百科事典) is a Japanese online encyclopedia that covers topics related to anime, video games, manga, and characters. This site, which also provides explanations of internet memes, is edited by users using a wiki system and has 350,000 words registered.

The Top 100 Internet Buzzwords Awards, held annually by Pixiv and Dwango, are determined based on how many page views a Pixiv Encyclopedia article explaining a specific subject received in a year.

Amazon has been receiving text-based data from Pixiv Encyclopedia since April 2, 2020, in order to improve the accuracy of Amazon Alexa. This data does not contain any personal information of users.

=== Pixiv Tsūshin ===
In collaboration with Enterbrain, Pixiv began to produce an online magazine entitled Pixiv Tsūshin (ピクシブ通信, Pixiv News) on April 20, 2009. The magazine contains information pertaining to the Pixiv community, and useful information for its users. This includes news articles on latest Pixiv news, how-to articles, interviews with popular artists on the website, and columns, including other things. Also, the magazine covers proactive activities artists on the website are doing related to the website such as the holding of art exhibitions. Also in collaboration with Enterbrain, a magazine titled Quarterly Pixiv will begin publication on May 28, 2010, containing material similar to that in Pixiv Tsūshin.

=== Booth ===
In 2013, Pixiv launched Booth, an online e-commerce platform allowing artists to offer physical (such as artwork and accessories) and digital goods for purchase by others.

Alongside competitor Gumroad, Booth has been one of the two most prominent marketplaces of assets within the VRChat community. In 2023, Booth launched a VRChat world known as the "Booth Cafe", allowing users to browse and demo 3D avatars being distributed on its platform. In 2026, Pixiv made an undisclosed investment in VRChat, Inc.

=== Pawoo ===
In 2017, Pixiv launched Pawoo, an instance of the decentralized open source social media network Mastodon, for its artist community. Pawoo Music, another Mastodon instance focusing on music services, was also launched. In July 2019, Pixiv announced it would shutdown Pawoo Music on 31 August, and end support for Pawoo's mobile Mastodon application. The Pawoo instance would still be kept operating. Pawoo is defederated by most instances on Mastodon due to allowing lolicon art.

Pixiv sold Pawoo to Japanese business-consulting firm Crossgate Inc. and Japanese media company Russell Co., Ltd. on December 2, 2019. On December 21, 2022, Russell sold Pawoo to The Social Coop Limited, a Cayman Islands-based entity affiliated with Web3 firm Mask Network.

=== pixivFanbox ===
In December 2016, Pixiv launched the initial version of pixivFanbox as a service to connect creators and fans. At the time, pixivFanbox offered blog-like features to creators, allowing them to publish content through auto-renewal subscription or pay-per-article. In April 2018, pixivFanbox was reworked, opening up registration for anyone on Pixiv. Payment plans were changed into monthly subscription plans, and creators were now able to set the number of support plans and the amount to pledge. The rework was made to allow the "fan community to support artists and creative activities." In April 2020, pixivFanbox celebrated its second anniversary, receiving its own domain name at fanbox.cc. With the update, creators were also able to set and share their own custom creator URL.

== Publications ==
=== Anthologies ===
First publication	Final publication	Title	Status	Frequency	Notes
2009	2011	Pixiv Girls Collection	Defunct	Yearly	3 volumes

=== Digital magazines ===
First publication	Final publication	Magazine name	Status	Frequency	Notes
1994	—N/a	Kurofune (クロフネ)	Active	Semi-yearly	First launched in 1994 by Biblos under the title Zero; re-launched in May 2008 as Kurofune Zero (クロフネZERO) under Libre; stories are all-genre with focus on the fantasy and science fiction genres. The magazine entered a joint partnership with Pixiv Comics in October 2012, where it is distributed digitally under their platform since then. The magazine was renamed Kurofune on November 24, 2016.
2017	—N/a	Love XXX Boys Pixiv (pronounced Love Kiss Boys Pixiv)	Active	Monthly	Launched on 15 August 2017; yaoi genre.

== Controversies ==
=== Chaos Lounge ===
The self-styled modern art group Chaos Lounge (カオス*ラウンジ) was suspected of collaborating with top-level management at Pixiv, though Pixiv later denied any connection to the group. Takanori Katagiri and Chaos Lounge deliberately used art solicited from a Pixiv contest in their own modern art collages. In these collages, visitors to the gallery were encouraged to "slowly trample upon" the images strewn out around the floor.

When Pixiv users complained that their work was being used inappropriately, Pixiv took no action to punish or suspend the accounts of Chaos Lounge or Takanori Katagiri. The controversy has created a mass exodus of frustrated artists from Pixiv to alternative art-centric sites such as Tinami and Pixa (now Egakuba). Traffic from the influx of frustrated Pixiv users has increased by as much as 50 times the normal rate for these sites, causing many of them to buckle under the weight of new users and go offline for maintenance. On July 27, 2011, Pixiv formally apologized on their website, promising to improve their management practices in the future.

=== Lawsuits ===
In June 2018, a former member of the idol girl group Niji no Conquistador filed a lawsuit against Pixiv representative director, Hiroaki Nagata (as well as Niji no Conquistador's management companies Dear Stage, Animate, and Pixiv), for voyeurism and sexual harassment during her time with the group. Nagata filed a counter lawsuit against her for libel. He then resigned following the lawsuit. On February 10, 2020, the Tokyo District Court dismissed Nagata's claims and ordered him to pay ¥1 million (equivalent to ¥1 million or US$7,880 in 2024) to the woman in damages.

On May 27, 2022, Bengo4 reported that a transgender woman filed a lawsuit against Pixiv and her boss for sexual harassment taking place as early as 2018, asking for ¥5.55 million in damages. In addition, several female and transgender employees also reported being sexually harassed by their bosses in the company. The incident sparked discussion among Pixiv users, many of whom decided to delete or hide their works on the website. On May 30, 2022, Pixiv released a statement of regret, acknowledging that disciplinary action was being taken. In the same statement, they mentioned that, in 2019, the perpetrator had been demoted, had his pay cut, and was banned from approaching the victim.

=== AI generated sexual depictions of minors ===
On May 31, 2023, Pixiv revised their content policy, specifying that photo-realistic images that included sexual depictions of minors were prohibited. This was in response to the proliferation of images that used AI software to generate the content. Pixiv has since taken preemptive actions in response to images using AI software.

In June 2023, BBC News released an article revealing that Pixiv users had been sharing photo-realistic depictions of sexual content involving minors, using AI software.

== See also ==
- Mixi
- My Lesbian Experience with Loneliness – originally published on Pixiv, and its English translation won the Harvey Award for Best Manga of 2018
- Nico Nico Douga
- DeviantArt
