= Toby Radloff =

American actor (born 1957)

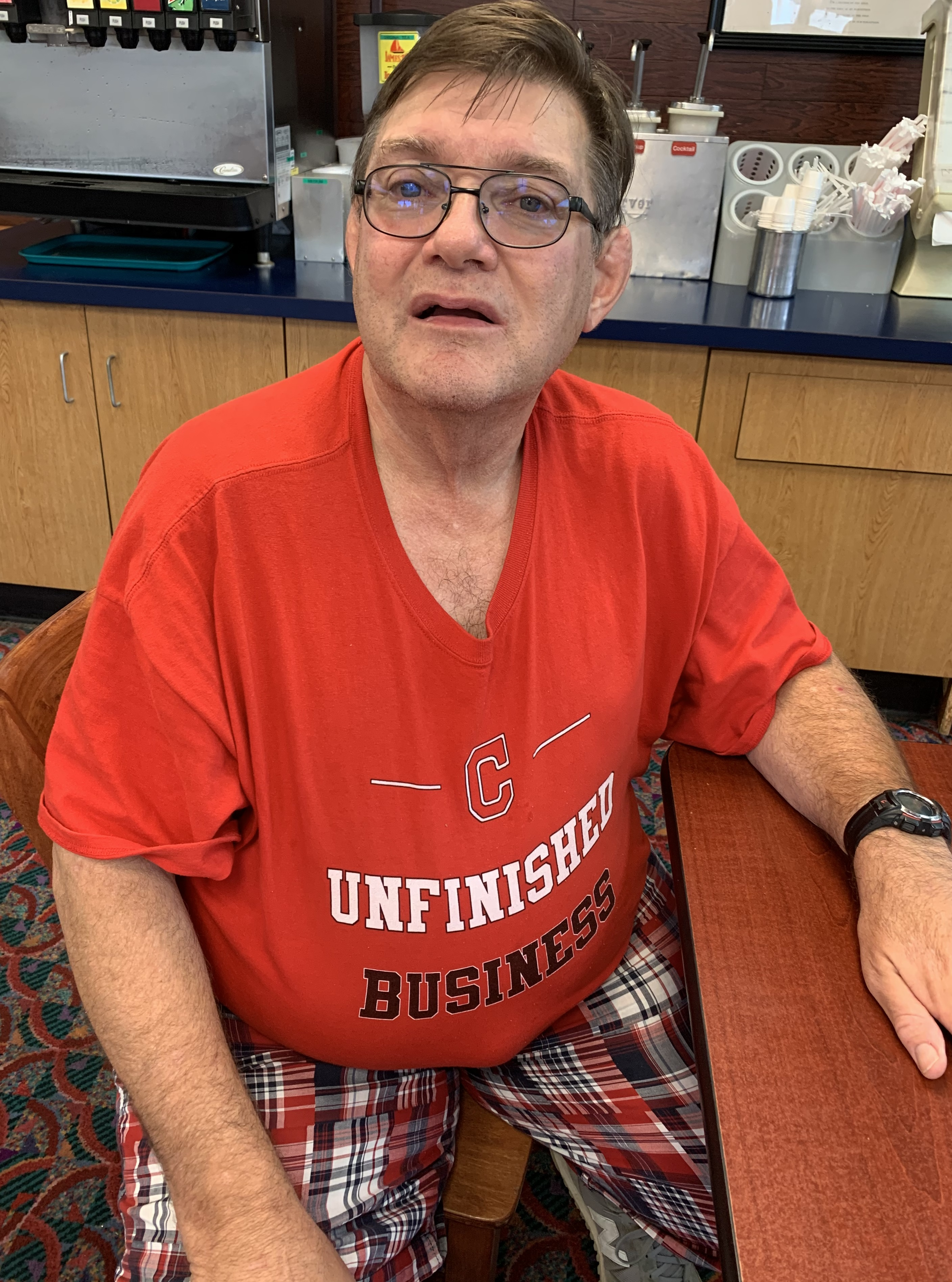
- Radloff in August 2021
- Born: December 12, 1957 (age 68); Cleveland, Ohio, U.S.
- Occupation: Film actor
- Known for: Killer Nerd

Toby Radloff (born December 12, 1957) is a former file clerk and actor who became a minor celebrity owing to his appearances in Cleveland writer Harvey Pekar's autobiographical comic book series American Splendor. Radloff has a distinctive manner of speech and quirky mannerisms. He is a self-proclaimed "Genuine Nerd". Radloff was portrayed by actor Judah Friedlander in the 2003 film, American Splendor.

== Career ==
Radloff met Pekar in 1980 when Radloff was hired at Cleveland's Veterans Administration Hospital, and shortly became a recurring character in American Splendor.

Television profiles of Pekar at work at the VA Hospital, in which Radloff appeared, led to Radloff being featured as a "special correspondent" in a few short comedic pieces on MTV in the late 1980s about Cleveland and White Castle hamburgers (a particular favorite of Radloff's). Radloff was also a frequent guest on a local Cleveland cable access show, The Eddie Marshall Show.

Radloff is a huge admirer of the 1984 film Revenge of the Nerds, which he estimated in 2003 to have seen at least 25 times; his enthusiasm for the film was documented in the American Splendor comic (and in a number of scenes in the American Splendor film). Radloff's public persona as a "Genuine Nerd", cemented by his appearances on MTV, led to his starring roles as Harold Kunkle in the comedy horror film Killer Nerd (1991) and its sequel Bride of Killer Nerd (1992).

In the 2003 American Splendor film, the adaptation of Pekar's work, Radloff is played by Judah Friedlander, and also appears as himself in the documentary sections of the film. Radloff publicly came out as gay after the film's release.

In 2006, a documentary on Radloff entitled Genuine Nerd was released, produced by Wayne Alan Harold, the creator of Radloff's original MTV segments (and co-director of the Killer Nerd films).

On August 3, 2006, Radloff tried out to be the next "Wack Packer" on The Howard Stern Show, but lost in the finals because Stern and crew felt that he was too famous.

In November 2026, Wayne Alan Harold released a preview scene for From Heck It Came, a feature-length "mockumentary" that stars Radloff as "himself," giving his unique take on vintage cult movies. The project is currently in production.

== Comic book appearances ==
All stories written by Harvey Pekar.

- [untitled cover], American Splendor No. 9 (Harvey Pekar, 1984) — art by Sean Carroll
- "Advertising", American Splendor No. 9 (Harvey Pekar, 1984) — art by Sean Carroll
- "Who Are You Kidding?", American Splendor No. 9 (Harvey Pekar, 1984) — art by Sean Carroll
- "History Repeats Itself", American Splendor No. 9 (Harvey Pekar, 1984) — art by Sean Carroll
- "Lentils And Lent", American Splendor No. 9 (Harvey Pekar, 1984) — art by Sean Carroll
- "Double Feature part 1: Footloose", American Splendor No. 10 (Harvey Pekar, 1985) — art by Bill Knapp
- "Double Feature part 2: Revenge Of The Nerds", American Splendor No. 10 (Harvey Pekar, 1985) — art by Bill Knapp
- "Higher Education", American Splendor No. 11 (Harvey Pekar, 1986) — art by Val Mayerik
- ["Hiya Toby" — back cover], American Splendor No. 11 (Harvey Pekar, 1986) — art by Greg Budgett and Gary Dumm
- "Blue Angels", American Splendor No. 12 (Harvey Pekar, 1987) — art by Ed Wesolowski
- "Hysteria", American Splendor No. 12 (Harvey Pekar, 1987) — art by Val Mayerik and James Sherman
- "Say No to Drugs", American Splendor No. 13 (Harvey Pekar, 1988) — art by Ed Wesolowski
- ["I saw that article on ya in the Plain Dealer, Toby" — back cover], American Splendor No. 13 (Harvey Pekar, 1988) — art by Greg Budgett and Gary Dumm
- "Typing", American Splendor No. 14 (Harvey Pekar, 1989) — art by Ed Wesolowski
- "Toby Saves The Day", American Splendor No. 15 (Harvey Pekar, 1990) — art by Ed Wesolowski
- "Wounded In Action", American Splendor No. 15 (Harvey Pekar, 1990) — art by Spain
- "Serial / Cereal", American Splendor No. 16 (Harvey Pekar, 1991) — art by Carole Sobocinski
- The Holy Roman Empire was Neither Holy nor Roman nor Empire", American Splendor No. 16 (Harvey Pekar, 1991) — art by Joe Zabel and Gary Dumm
- "Self Justification or Anticipating the Critics", American Splendor No. 16 (Harvey Pekar, 1991) — art by Frank Stack
- "The Last Word In Answers", American Splendor No. 17 (Dark Horse, 1993) — art by Carole Sobocinski
- "A Step... Out of the Nest", American Splendor Special: A Step Out of the Nest (Dark Horse, August 1994) — art by Joe Zabel and Gary Dumm & John Stats
- "Breakfast at Billy's", Dark Horse Presents #100-3 (Dark Horse, August 1995) — art by Joe Sacco
- "Flight To Chicago", American Splendor: Windfall #1 (Dark Horse, September 1995) — art by Joe Zabel and Gary Dumm
- "Reduction", American Splendor: Portrait of the Author in His Declining Years (Dark Horse, 2001) — art by Josh Neufeld
- "Waiting For a Jump", American Splendor: Our Movie Year (Random House, December 2004) — art by Gerry Shamray
- "Hollywood Reporter", American Splendor: Our Movie Year (Random House, December 2004) — art by Josh Neufeld

== Filmography ==
Film
Year	Title	Role
1991	Killer Nerd	Harold Kunkle
1992	Bride of Killer Nerd	Harold Kunkle
1999	Townies	Dickie
2003	American Splendor	Real Toby
2006	The Oh in Ohio	Toby
2006	Genuine Nerd	Himself
2007	Cordoba Nights	Man in parked car
2008	The Comic Book Lady	Toby
2012	Sonny Days	Russell
2019	Spirit Animal	Tree of Life
2027	From Heck It Came	Himself
