= Brian Bram =

American artist

Brian Bram (born May 9, 1955, in Chicago) is an American artist and art director. He played a minor role in the underground comix movement with his early contributions to American Splendor, the comic book series written and published by Harvey Pekar.

== Biography ==
Bram, born in Chicago, was raised in Deerfield, Illinois. His first paid illustration job was a logo for a local rock band. At 17 he began contributing to Triad, a Chicago-based alternative magazine that published work by Skip Williamson and others. At 18 Bram served briefly as art director for the magazine.

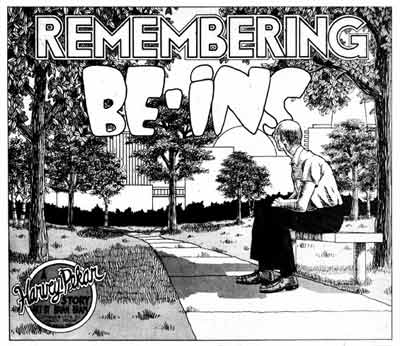
"Remembering Be-Ins," splash panel by Brian Bram, American Splendor #1, 1976

Bram moved to Cleveland in 1975 to major in design and illustration at the Cleveland Institute of Art. According to the Comiclopedia, underground cartoonist Jay Lynch introduced Bram to Pekar, who hired him to illustrate stories in the first issue of American Splendor.

Bram contributed to the first two issues of American Splendor, along with artists Gary Dumm, Greg Budgett, and Robert Crumb. He provided the art for "Remembering Be-Ins" in American Splendor #1 (1976) and "Rollins on Mars," "May 4–5, 1970," and "Zoology" in American Splendor #2 (1977). In 1979 he moved to Rochester, New York, to study film and animation at the Rochester Institute of Technology.

In 1983 Bram produced and hosted an all-night movie program (All Night Live) on WUHF (channel 31; then an independent station; now affiliated with the Fox network). In addition to movies, the program was a forum for local bands, including Personal Effects, The Degrads, and Cousin Al and the Relatives.

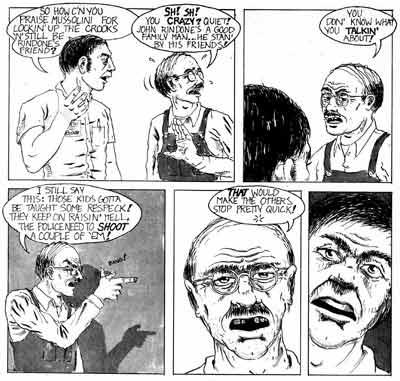
"May 4–5, 1970," interior art by Brian Bram, American Splendor #2, 1977

Since 1987 Bram has been living in Boston, Massachusetts and working as a creative director in the interactive industry.

In 2023, Bram was invited by Jonathan Baylis, author of the independent comic book series, So...Buttons, to participate in issue #13 of that series along with other American Splendor alumni Gary Dumm, Michael T. Gilbert, Dean Haspiel, and Joe Zabel.

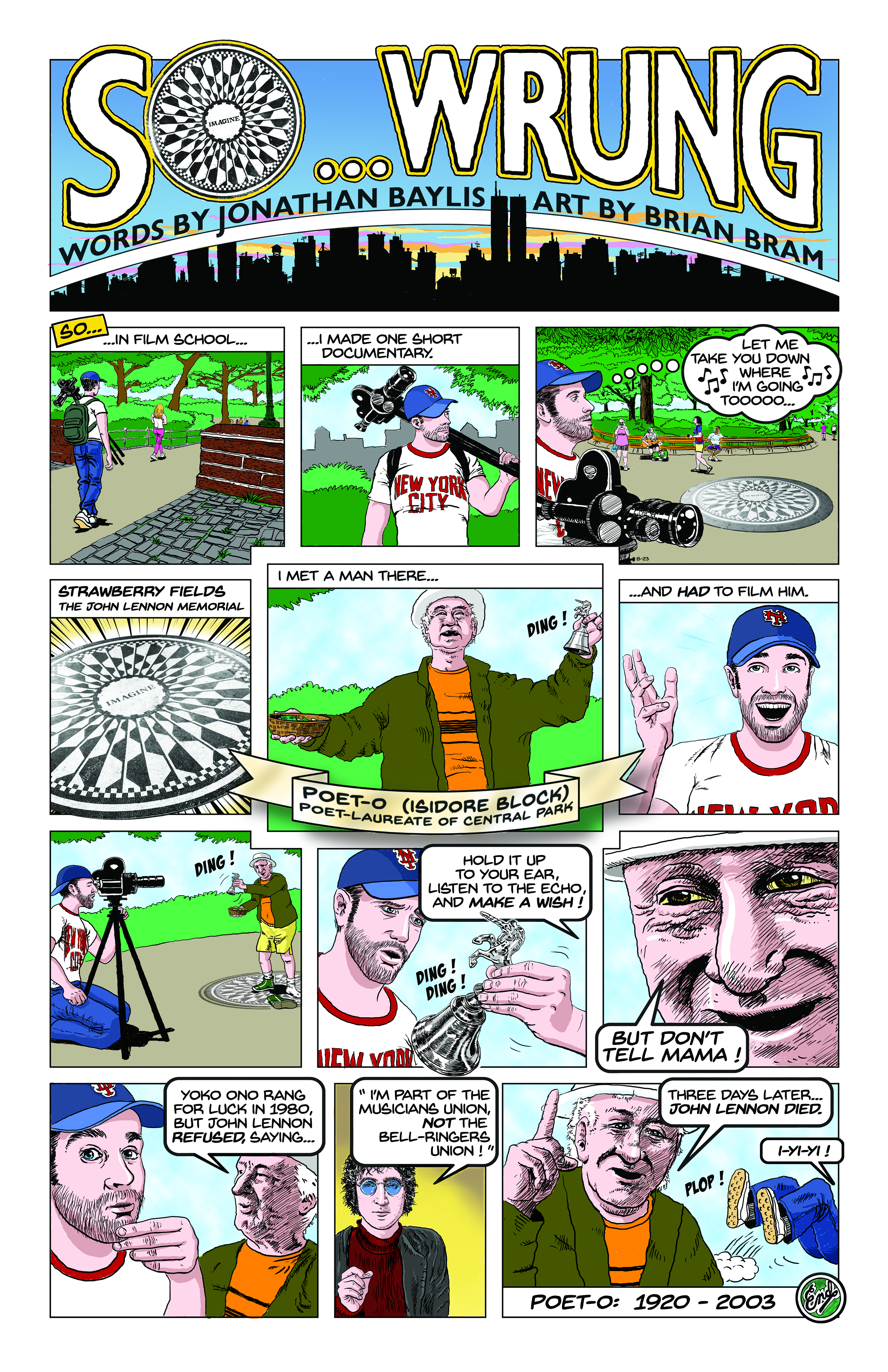
"So...Wrung" one-page story, art by Brian Bram, So...Buttons #13, 2023, written and published by Jonathan Baylis
