= Overheard =

Overheard may refer to:

- Overheard (film), 2009 Hong Kong crime thriller film
  - Overheard 2, 2011 Hong Kong crime thriller film, sequel to the 2009 film Overheard
- Overheard (Kyle XY), an episode of the television show Kyle XY
- Overheard in New York, a humor blog based in New York City
  - Overheard in Pittsburgh, its Pittsburgh counterpart
- Overheard at National Geographic, a podcast by National Geographic
