= American Splendor =

Autobiographical comic books by Harvey Pekar

- Cover of American Splendor #1 (1976), art by Gary Dumm (pencils) and Greg Budgett (inks).

Publication information
- Publisher: Self-published (1976–1991); Dark Horse Comics (1993–2002); DC Comics (2006–2008)
- Schedule: Yearly (1976–1991); Irregular (1993–2008)
- Format: Ongoing series
- Publication date: May 1976 – September 2008
- No. of issues: 39
- Main character(s): Harvey Pekar; Joyce Brabner; Toby Radloff; Danielle Batone

Creative team
- Written by: Harvey Pekar
- Artist(s): Robert Crumb; Gary Dumm; Greg Budgett; Brian Bram

Collected editions
- The Life and Times of Harvey Pekar: ISBN 0-345-46830-9
- More American Splendor: ISBN 0-385-24073-2

American Splendor is a series of autobiographical comic books written by Harvey Pekar and drawn by a variety of artists. The first issue was published in 1976 and the last one in September 2008, with publication occurring at irregular intervals. Publishers were, at various times, Harvey Pekar himself, Dark Horse Comics, and DC Comics.

The comics have been adapted into a film of the same name and a number of theatrical productions.

== Origins ==
Despite comic books in the United States being traditionally the province of fantasy-adventure and other genre stories, Pekar felt that the medium could be put to wider use:

When I was a little kid, and I was reading these comics in the '40s, I kind of got sick of them because after a while, they were just formulaic. I figured there was some kind of a flaw that keeps them from getting better than they are, and then when I saw Robert Crumb's work in the early '60s, when he moved from Philadelphia to Cleveland, and he moved around the corner from me, I thought, 'Man, comics are where it's at'.

Pekar's philosophy of the potential of comics is also expressed in his often repeated statement that "comics are words and pictures. You can do anything with words and pictures". In an interview with Walrus Comix, Pekar described how the idea of producing his own comic book developed. In 1972 when Crumb was visiting him in Cleveland, Pekar showed him his story ideas. Not only did Crumb agree to draw some of them but also offered to show them to other artists to draw. By 1975, Pekar decided to produce and publish his own comic book.

Recurring character Toby Radloff first appeared in American Splendor #9 (1984), as did Joyce Brabner. Pekar and Brabner's adopted daughter, Danielle, was first introduced in American Splendor: Bedtime Stories (1999).

== Themes ==
The stories in American Splendor concern the everyday life of Pekar in Cleveland, Ohio, told in a brutally frank style akin to the writing of Henry Miller. Pekar's stories eschew traditional narrative structure, focusing on small moments and observations. As Robert Pulcini, co-writer and co-director of the American Splendor film, said: "The whole point of the American Splendor comics is that life doesn't really organize itself well".

Situations covered include Pekar's job as a file clerk at a Veteran's Affairs hospital and his relations with colleagues and patients there. There are also stories about Pekar and his relations with friends and family, including his second wife, Lark (issues #5, #7), his third wife, Joyce Brabner (issue #9 onward), and their adopted daughter, Danielle. Other stories concern everyday situations such as Pekar's troubles with his car, money, his health, and his concerns and anxieties in general. Several issues (#14, #13, #18) give accounts of Pekar's becoming a recurring guest on the NBC television show Late Night with David Letterman, including a 1987 interview segment in which Pekar criticized Letterman for ducking criticism of General Electric, the parent company of NBC. American Splendor sometimes departs from Pekar's own life, with stories about jazz musicians (#23), the artists for his comics (#25), and a three-issue miniseries American Splendor: Unsung Hero (#29–31), which chronicles the Vietnam experience of Pekar's African-American co-worker Robert McNeill.

== Artists ==
Pekar was not an artist himself, incapable of "drawing a straight line", according to a line in the film version of his story, so he recruited his friend, underground comics artist Robert Crumb, to help launch American Splendor. As Crumb described it:

"...[H]e didn't draw at all. He never even tried to learn. But he understood comics very well, and the rhythm of comics.... He was deeply into comics so he had a feel for how to tell a story in comic book form.... He was a great comic book writer".

As The Complete Crumb Comics co-editor Robert Fiore wrote about the Pekar/Crumb collaborations:

[I]n American Splendor, Crumb's work stood out for ... the way he really made Pekar's voice SING. His style embodied Pekar's voice.... He turned Pekar's scripts into pure comics, into something that would have been inferior in any other medium.... But I think what makes all of their collaborations work so well is the fact that Crumb is as sympathetic a collaborator as Pekar ever had. It's not just the fact that Crumb draws better than everybody else, he knew what to draw. Just as Pekar knew what to write.... Their mutual understanding of each other helped me appreciate each as artists and voices....

As things evolved, however, Crumb explained:

"I didn't want to spend all of my time just drawing [Pekar's] stuff. So, he very quickly realized that and got other artists to draw his stuff too. He chased down all kinds of artists to draw his comics".

In addition to Crumb, Pekar's most well-known and longest-running collaborators included Gary Dumm, Greg Budgett, Spain Rodriguez, Joe Zabel, Gerry Shamray, Frank Stack, Mark Zingarelli, and Joe Sacco. Other notable American Splendor illustrators include Alison Bechdel, Joyce Brabner, Brian Bram, Chester Brown, Alan Moore, David Collier, Drew Friedman, Michael T. Gilbert, Dean Haspiel, Paul Mavrides, Val Mayerik, Josh Neufeld, Ed Piskor, James Sherman, Don Simpson and Jim Woodring. The later Vertigo Comics-published issues employed a new crop of artists, including Ty Templeton, Richard Corben, Hunt Emerson, Eddie Campbell, Gilbert Hernandez, Ho Che Anderson, Hilary Barta, Bob Fingerman, Rick Geary, David Lapham, John Lucas, Leonardo Manco, José Marzan Jr., Warren Pleece, Chris Samnee and Chris Weston.

== Publication history ==
Pekar produced seventeen issues of American Splendor from 1976 to 1993 — usually each May — which, except for the last few issues, he also self-published and self-distributed. By keeping back issues in print and available (contrary to the industry practice of the time), Pekar continued to receive income on previously completed work, although at the time some of them were published, according to his Comics Journal interview (1985), he was losing thousands of dollars per year on the books.Starting in 1994, additional American Splendor were published by Dark Horse Comics, although these issues are not numbered. They include the two-issue American Splendor: Windfall and several themed issues such as American Splendor: Transatlantic Comics and American Splendor: On the Job. In September 2006, a four-issue American Splendor mini-series was published by the DC Comics imprint Vertigo. A second four-issue miniseries was published by DC in 2008.

List of American Splendor issues
Number	Date of publication	Pages (including cover)	Artists	Publisher
1	May 1976	52	Brian Bram, Greg Budgett, Robert Crumb, Gary Dumm, Lad Jeric	Harvey Pekar
2	April 1977	60	Bram, Budgett, Crumb, Dumm	Harvey Pekar
3	1978	56	Budgett, Crumb, Dumm	Harvey Pekar
4	1979	60	Crumb, Dumm, Michael T. Gilbert, Gerry Shamray	Harvey Pekar
5	1980	60	Budgett, Crumb, Dumm, Shamray	Harvey Pekar
6	1981	60	Budgett, Dumm, Michael T. Gilbert, Shamray	Harvey Pekar
7	June 1982	60	Kevin Brown, Budgett, Sean Carroll, Sue Cavey, Crumb, Rick Dahl, Dumm, Jack Millie, Shamray	Harvey Pekar
8	1983	60	Brown, Budgett, Cavey, Crumb, Dumm, Shamray	Harvey Pekar
9	1984	60	Carroll, Crumb, Dumm, Philip Fried, Barry Hoffman, Bill Knapp, Val Mayerik, May Midwest, Mitch Sonoda	Harvey Pekar
10	1985	60	Bill Crook, Dumm, Knapp, Mayerik, Sonoda, Joe Zabel	Harvey Pekar
11	1986	60	Joyce Brabner, Budgett, Dumm, Knapp, Mayerik, Spain Rodriguez, Ed Wesolowski, Zabel	Harvey Pekar
12	1987	60	Budgett, Gilbert Clark, Crumb, Dumm, Drew Friedman, Mayerik, Shamray, James Sherman, Spain, Frank Stack, Wesolowski, Zabel	Harvey Pekar
13	1988	60	Budgett, Dumm, Friedman, Rebecca Huntington, Paul Mavrides, Mayerik, Don Simpson, Stack, Wesolowski, Zabel	Harvey Pekar
14	1989	60	Alison Bechdel, Budgett, Stephen DeStefano, Dumm, Linda Dumm, William Fogg, Friedman, Huntington, Mavrides, Simpson, Stack, Wesolowski, Zabel	Harvey Pekar
15	1990	60	Chester Brown, Dumm, Knapp, Alan Moore, Carol Sobocinski, Spain, Stack, Richard G. Taylor, Wesolowski, Zabel, Mark Zingarelli	Harvey Pekar
16	Nov 1991	60	Dumm, Sobocinski, Spain, Stack, Jim Woodring, Zabel	Harvey Pekar in association with Tundra Publishing
17	1993	60	Dumm, Mavrides, Joe Sacco, Shamray, Sobocinski, Stack, J. R. Stats, Alex Wald, Woodring, Zabel	Dark Horse Comics
(18) A Step Out of the Nest	Aug 1994	36	Dumm, Zabel	Dark Horse
(19) Windfall 1	Sep 1995	44	Dumm, Josh Neufeld, Stack, Zabel	Dark Horse
(20) Windfall 2	Oct 1995	44	Dumm, Scott A. Gilbert, Neufeld, Sacco, Stack, Zabel	Dark Horse
(21) Comic-Con Comics	Aug 1996	28	Dumm, Scott A. Gilbert, Neufeld, Zabel	Dark Horse
(22) On the Job	May 1997	28	Dumm, Sacco, Stack, Zabel	Dark Horse
(23) Music Comics	Nov 1997	28	Sacco	Dark Horse
(24) Odds and Ends	Dec 1997	28	Dumm, Sam Hurt, Neufeld, Sacco, Shamray, Zabel	Dark Horse
(25) Transatlantic Comics	Jul 1998	28	Stack, Colin Warneford	Dark Horse
(26) Terminal	Sep 1999	28	Dumm, Sacco, Stack	Dark Horse
(27) Bedtime Stories	June 2000	28	David Collier, Dean Haspiel, Neufeld, Sacco, Spain, Stack	Dark Horse
(28) Portrait of the Author in his Declining Years	Apr 2001	28	Collier, Dumm, Haspiel, Neufeld, Sacco, Stack	Dark Horse
(29) Unsung Hero 1	Aug 2002	28	Collier	Dark Horse
(30) Unsung Hero 2	Sep 2002	28	Collier	Dark Horse
(31) Unsung Hero 3	Oct 2002	28	Collier	Dark Horse
(32) 1	Nov 2006	36	Hilary Barta, Budgett, Dumm, Glenn Fabry, Haspiel, Ty Templeton	Vertigo
(33) 2	Dec 2006	36	Eddie Campbell, Richard Corben, Haspiel, Leonardo Manco, Chris Samnee, Chris Weston, Chandler Wood	Vertigo
(34) 3	Jan 2007	36	Zachary Baldus, Budgett, Giuseppe Camuncoli, Dumm, Hunt Emerson, Rick Geary, Haspiel, Neufeld, Templeton, Steve Vance	Vertigo
(35) 4	Feb 2007	36	Ho Che Anderson, Baldus, Budgett, Dumm, Emerson, Bob Fingerman, Geary, Haspiel, Gilbert Hernandez	Vertigo
(36) Vol 2 1	June 2008	36	Baldus, Barta, Philip Bond, Haspiel, Mike Hawthorne, David Lapham, John Lucas, Ed Piskor, Weston	Vertigo
(37) Vol 2 2	July 2008	36	Baldus, Budgett, Dumm, Emerson, Haspiel, Lora Innes, Lapham, José Marzan Jr., Neufeld, Darick Robertson, Templeton	Vertigo
(38) Vol 2 3	Aug 2008	36	John Cebollero, Darwyn Cooke, Geary, Haspiel, Sean Murphy, Neufeld, Warren Pleece, Samnee	Vertigo
(39) Vol 2 4	Sep 2008	36	Budgett, Dumm, Geary, Haspiel, Robertson, Templeton	Vertigo

== Collected editions ==
Many stories from American Splendor have been collected into trade paperbacks from various publishers, their material not (for the most part) overlapping:

- American Splendor: The Life and Times of Harvey Pekar, collecting material from #1-9 (Doubleday, 1986, ISBN 0-345-46830-9)
- More American Splendor, collecting material from #2-11 (Doubleday, 1987, ISBN 0-385-24073-2)
  - American Splendor, compiles the previous two collections into a single volume, released alongside the film (Random House, 2003, ISBN 978-0-3454-6830-7)
- The New American Splendor Anthology, collecting material from #3-5 and #7-15 (Four Walls Eight Windows, 1991, ISBN 0-941423-64-6)
- American Splendor Presents: Bob & Harv's Comics, with R. Crumb, collecting material from #1-5, #7-8, #12 (Four Walls Eight Windows, 1996, ISBN 1-56858-101-7)
- American Splendor: Unsung Hero, with David Collier, collecting Unsung Hero #1-3 (Dark Horse Comics, 2003, ISBN 1-59307-040-3)
- Best of American Splendor, collecting material from #16-17, A Step Out of the Nest, Windfall #1-2, Comic Con Comics, On the Job, Music Comics, Odds and Ends, Transatlantic Comics, Terminal, Bedtime Stories, Portrait of the Author in his Declining Years, and MODE (Ballantine Books, 2005, ISBN 0-345-47938-6)
- American Splendor: Another Day, collecting Vertigo Vol 1. #1-4 (DC/Vertigo, 2007, ISBN 978-1-4012-1235-3)
- American Splendor: Another Dollar, collecting Vertigo Vol 2. #1-4 (DC/Vertigo, 2009, ISBN 978-1-4012-2173-7)

== Graphic novels and other collections ==
Pekar wrote two larger works that carry the American Splendor label: Our Movie Year (Ballantine Books, 2004) and Ego & Hubris: The Michael Malice Story (Ballantine, 2006). Our Movie Year is a collection of comics written about or at the time of the American Splendor film; it includes an original piece illustrated by Ed Piskor, as well as material originally published in a variety of sources, including Entertainment Weekly, Cleveland Scene, The New York Times, Time Out New York, LA Weekly, Empire magazine, Gambit Weekly, the Music Maker Relief Foundation, the American Splendor film soundtrack CD, and the Sundance Film Festival Daily Insider. Ego & Hubris is a biography of the early life of the author Michael Malice.

Pekar also wrote two graphic novels which are not officially labeled American Splendor but which should arguably be considered part of it: Our Cancer Year (Four Walls Eight Windows, 1994), co-written with Pekar's wife Joyce Brabner and illustrated by Frank Stack, covering the year when Pekar was diagnosed with cancer; and The Quitter (DC/Vertigo, 2005), illustrated by Dean Haspiel, which deals with Pekar's youth.

- Harvey Pekar and Joyce Brabner (w), Frank Stack (a). Our Cancer Year (1994). Four Walls Eight Windows. ISBN 1-56858-011-8
- Harvey Pekar (w), various (a). American Splendor: Our Movie Year (2004). Ballantine Books. ISBN 0-345-47937-8
- Harvey Pekar (w), Dean Haspiel (a). The Quitter (2005). DC/Vertigo. ISBN 1-4012-0399-X
- Harvey Pekar (w), Gary Dumm (a). American Splendor Presents: Ego & Hubris - The Michael Malice Story (2006). Ballantine Books. ISBN 0-345-47939-4

== Adaptations ==
=== Theatrical productions ===
Theatrical productions based on American Splendor have been mounted over the years:

- September–October 1985 – Adapted and directed by Conrad Bishop, with Herb O'Dell as Harvey. Produced by The Independent Eye in Lancaster, Pennsylvania.
- November 1987 – Adapted by Lloyd Rose and directed by James C. Nicola, with Richard Bauer as Harvey, Isiah Whitlock Jr. as Mr. Boats, and Brigid Cleary and Anderson Matthews in supporting roles. Produced by Arena Stage in the Old Vat Room in Washington, DC.
- September 1990–September 1991 – Adapted and directed by Vince Waldron, with Dan Castellaneta as Harvey, Andy Wilson as Mr. Boats, and Richard Kuhlman, Steve Sheridan, Monica Horan, David O'Shea, and Siobhan Fallon Hogan in supporting roles. Produced at the Theatre/Theater in Hollywood, California (and represented in fictionalized form in the American Splendor film, with Donal Logue as Harvey and Molly Shannon as Joyce).
- 2024-2025 – Composed by Scott Fields, Pekar is a musical suite of stories from American Splendor comic books. The 95-minute-long suite includes eight stories, with instrumental interludes. The instrumentation is female voice, accordion, marimba, guitar, and tuba. Pages from the corresponding comics are projected as surtitles. The premiere of Pekar was held on November 14, 2024, in Cologne, Germany, with performances in nine other German cities in 2025. Development of the suite was started with Joyce Brabner in 2021.

=== Film ===
In 2003 a film adaptation featuring Paul Giamatti playing Pekar (as well as appearances by Pekar himself) and Hope Davis as his wife was released to critical acclaim and first honors at the Sundance Film Festival, in addition to the Writers Guild of America Award for best adapted screenplay. The film was written and directed by documentarians Shari Springer Berman and Robert Pulcini, and was filmed entirely on location in Cleveland and Lakewood in Ohio. At the 2003 Cannes Film Festival, the film received the FIPRESCI critics award. It was also nominated for Best Adapted Screenplay at the 2003 Academy Awards.

== Sources ==
- American Splendor at the Grand Comics Database (Harvey Pekar)
- American Splendor at the Grand Comics Database (Dark Horse Comics)
