= People-watching =

Observational pastime

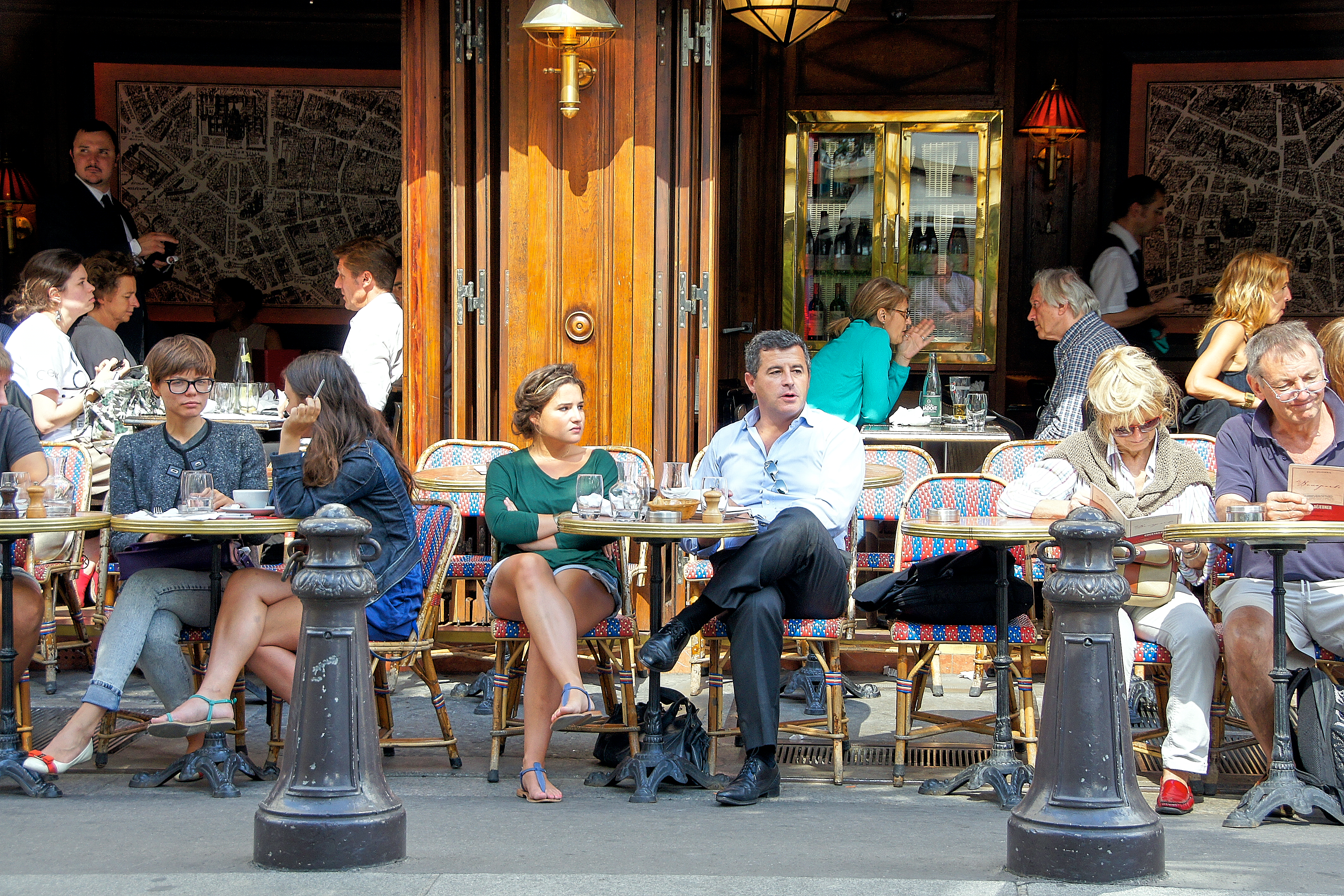
Customers looking out from a Parisian café

People-watching or crowd watching is the act of observing people and their interactions in public. It involves picking up on idiosyncrasies to try to interpret or guess at another person's story, interactions, and relationships with the limited details they have. This includes speech in action, relationship interactions, body language, expressions, clothing, activities and crowd behaviours. Eavesdropping may accompany the activity, as documented by the humor blog Overheard in New York, though it is not required.

People-watching is distinguished from naturalistic observation, a process used for scientific purposes, compared to people-watching as a casual activity, used for relaxation or inspiration for characters or characters' mannerisms in their own creative works. It can also be distinguished from street photography; while the street photographer necessarily undertakes a form of people-watching, they do so for the purpose of composing photographs for artistic and documentary purposes.

== See also ==
- Candid photography – Photograph captured without creating a posed appearance
- Espionage – Clandestine acquisition of confidential information
- Observation deck – Elevated sightseeing platform
- Observation tower – Tall structure for long-distance viewing
- Sousveillance – Recording of an activity by a participant
