= Harvey Pekar =

American comic book writer, music critic and media personality

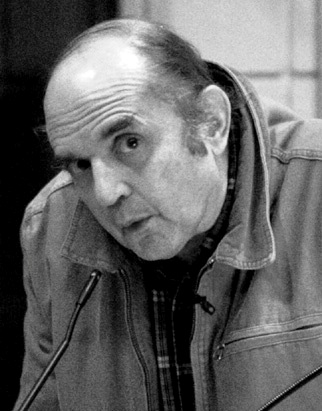
- Born: Harvey Lawrence Pekar; October 8, 1939; Cleveland, Ohio, U.S.
- Died: July 12, 2010 (aged 70); Cleveland Heights, Ohio, U.S.
- Occupations: Comic book writer; filing clerk; music; literary critic
- Spouses: Karen Delaney (m. 1960; div. 1972) Helen Lark Hall (m. 1977; div. 1982) Joyce Brabner (m. 1983)
- Writing career
- Years active: 1959–2010
- Genres: Underground comics Alternative comics
- Subject: Autobiography
- Notable works: American Splendor; Our Cancer Year
- Notable awards: Inkpot Award, 1986; American Book Award, 1987; Harvey Award, 1995; Eisner Award Hall of Fame, 2011

Harvey Lawrence Pekar (/ˈpiːkɑːr/; October 8, 1939 – July 12, 2010) was an American underground comic book writer, music critic, and media personality, best known for his autobiographical American Splendor comic series. In 2003, the series inspired a film adaptation of the same name.

Frequently described as the "poet laureate of Cleveland", Pekar "helped change the appreciation for, and perceptions of, the graphic novel, the drawn memoir, the autobiographical comic narrative." Pekar described his work as "autobiography written as it's happening. The theme is about staying alive, getting a job, finding a mate, having a place to live, finding a creative outlet. Life is a war of attrition. You have to stay active on all fronts. It's one thing after another. I've tried to control a chaotic universe. And it's a losing battle. But I can't let go. I've tried, but I can't."

Among the awards given to Pekar for his work were the Inkpot Award, the American Book Award, a Harvey Award, and his posthumous induction into the Eisner Award Hall of Fame.

== Life ==
Harvey Pekar and his younger brother Allen were born in Cleveland, Ohio, to a Jewish family. Their parents were Saul and Dora Pekar, immigrants from Białystok, Poland. Saul Pekar was a Talmudic scholar who owned a grocery store on Kinsman Avenue, with the family living above the store. Although Pekar said he wasn't close to his parents due to their dissimilar backgrounds and because they worked all the time, he still "marveled at how devoted they were to each other. They had so much love and admiration for one another."

Pekar's first language as a child was Yiddish and he learned to read and appreciate novels in the language.

Pekar said he did not have friends for the first few years of his life. The neighborhood he lived in had once been all white but became mostly black by the 1940s. One of the few white children living there, Pekar was often beaten up. He later believed this instilled in him "a profound sense of inferiority." This experience, however, also taught him to become a "respected street scrapper."

Pekar graduated from Shaker Heights High School in 1957. He then briefly served in the United States Navy. After being discharged he attended Case Western Reserve University, where he dropped out after a year. He worked odd jobs before he was hired as file clerk at the Veterans Administration Hospital in 1965. He held this job after becoming famous, refusing all promotions, until he retired in 2001.

Pekar was married three times. He was married from 1960 to 1972 to his first wife, Karen Delaney. According to fellow cartoonist R. Crumb, who knew the couple socially, "She left him.... She took all the money out of their bank account and ran off.... Never heard from her again."

His second wife was Helen Lark Hall, who appeared (as "Lark") in a number of early issues of American Splendor. They married in 1977. According to Crumb again (and as dramatized in the American Splendor film), "...she was trying to have a career in academia and Harvey would embarrass her. They'd go to these academic cocktail parties and Harvey would deliberately antagonize these professors. He thought the whole academia thing was bullshit. So he used to embarrass her and she'd become angry at him until finally she gave up on him." They divorced in 1982.

Pekar's third wife, whom he married in 1983, was writer Joyce Brabner who became a regular character in American Splendor and to whom he remained married until his death.

In 1990, as described by Publishers Weekly, "Pekar was diagnosed with lymphoma and needed chemotherapy. By the time the disease was discovered, the couple was in the midst of buying a house (a tremendous worry to Pekar, who fretted about both the money and corruptions of bourgeois creature comforts)." After Pekar's recovery, he and Brabner collaborated on Our Cancer Year (released in 1994), a graphic novel account of that experience, as well as his harrowing yet successful treatment.

Around this same time, Brabner and Pekar became guardians of a young girl, Danielle Batone, when she was nine years old. Danielle became the couple's foster daughter and eventually became a recurring character in American Splendor as well.

After his 2001 retirement, Pekar increasingly relied on freelance and collaborative book-length projects for income, as his earlier self-published work had often generated limited financial return.

Pekar lived in Cleveland Heights, Ohio, with Brabner and Batone.

== Career ==
=== Early comics work ===
Pekar's friendship with Robert Crumb led to the creation of the self-published, autobiographical comic book series American Splendor. Crumb and Pekar became friends through their shared love of jazz records. It took Pekar a decade to do so: "I theorized for maybe ten years about doing comics." Pekar's influences from the literary world included James Joyce, Arthur Miller, George Ade, Henry Roth, and Daniel Fuchs.

Around 1972, Pekar laid out some stories with crude stick figures and showed them to Crumb and another artist, Robert Armstrong. Impressed, they both offered to illustrate. Pekar & Crumb's one-pager "Crazy Ed" was published as the back cover of Crumb's The People's Comics (Golden Gate Publishing Company, 1972), becoming Pekar's first published work of comics. Including "Crazy Ed" and before the publication of American Splendor #1, Pekar wrote a number of other comic stories that were published in a variety of outlets:

- "Crazy Ed", with Robert Crumb, in The People's Comics (Golden Gate Publishing Company, 1972)
- "A Mexican Tale," with Greg Budgett and Munan, in Flaming Baloney X (Propaganda Ink, c. 1975)
- "It Pays to Advertise" with Willy Murphy, in Flamed-Out Funnies #1 (Keith Green, Aug. 1975)
- "Ain' It the Truth" with Willy Murphy, in Flamed-Out Funnies #1 (Keith Green, Aug. 1975)
- "The Boys on the Corner: A Good Shit Is Best" with Willy Murphy, in Flamed-Out Funnies #1 (Keith Green, Aug. 1975)
- "The Kinsman Cowboys: How'd Ya Get Inta This Bizness Ennyway?" with Greg Budgett & Gary Dumm, in Bizarre Sex #4 (Kitchen Sink Press, Oct. 1975)
- "Famous Street Fights: The Champ" with Robert Armstrong in Comix Book #4 (Kitchen Sink Press, Feb. 1976)
- "Don't Rain on My Parade" with Robert Armstrong in Snarf #6 (Kitchen Sink Press, Feb. 1976)

=== American Splendor ===
The first issue of Pekar's self-published American Splendor series appeared in May 1976, with stories illustrated by Crumb, Dumm, Budgett, and Brian Bram. Applying the "brutally frank autobiographical style of Henry Miller," American Splendor documented Pekar's daily life in the aging neighborhoods of his native Cleveland.

Pekar and his work came to greater prominence in 1986 when Doubleday collected much of the material from the first ten issues in American Splendor: The Life and Times of Harvey Pekar, which was positively reviewed by, among others, The New York Times. (1986 was also the year Pekar began appearing on Late Night with David Letterman.)

Pekar self-published 15 issues of American Splendor from 1976 to 1991 (issue #16 was co-published with Tundra Publishing). Dark Horse Comics took on the publishing and distribution of Pekar's comics from 1993 to 2003.

In 2006, Pekar released a four-issue American Splendor miniseries through the DC Comics imprint Vertigo Comics. This was collected in the American Splendor: Another Day paperback. In 2008 Vertigo released a second four-issue "season" of American Splendor that was later collected in the American Splendor: Another Dollar paperback.

Pekar's best-known and longest-running collaborators include Crumb, Dumm, Budgett, Spain Rodriguez, Joe Zabel, Gerry Shamray, Frank Stack, Mark Zingarelli, and Joe Sacco. In the 2000s, he teamed regularly with artists Dean Haspiel and Josh Neufeld. Other cartoonists who worked with him include Jim Woodring, Chester Brown, Alison Bechdel, Gilbert Hernandez, Eddie Campbell, David Collier, Drew Friedman, Ho Che Anderson, Rick Geary, Ed Piskor, Hunt Emerson, Bob Fingerman, and Alex Wald; as well as such non-traditional illustrators as Pekar's wife, Joyce Brabner, and comics writer Alan Moore.

In addition to his autobiographical work on American Splendor, Pekar wrote a number of biographies. The first of these, American Splendor: Unsung Hero (Dark Horse Comics, 2003), illustrated by David Collier, documented the Vietnam War experience of Robert McNeill, one of Pekar's African-American coworkers at Cleveland's VA hospital.

Stories from the American Splendor comics have been collected in many books and anthologies.

=== American Splendor film ===
A film adaptation of American Splendor was released in 2003, directed by Robert Pulcini and Shari Springer Berman. It starred Paul Giamatti as Pekar, as well as appearances by Pekar himself (and his wife Joyce, foster daughter Danielle, and co-worker Toby Radloff). American Splendor won the Grand Jury Prize for Dramatic Film at the 2003 Sundance Film Festival, in addition to the award for Best Adapted Screenplay from the Writers Guild of America. At the 2003 Cannes Film Festival, the film received the FIPRESCI critics award. American Splendor was given the Guardian New Directors Award at the 2003 Edinburgh International Film Festival. It was also nominated for Best Adapted Screenplay at the 2003 Academy Awards. Pekar wrote about the effects of the film in American Splendor: Our Movie Year.

=== Other comics work ===
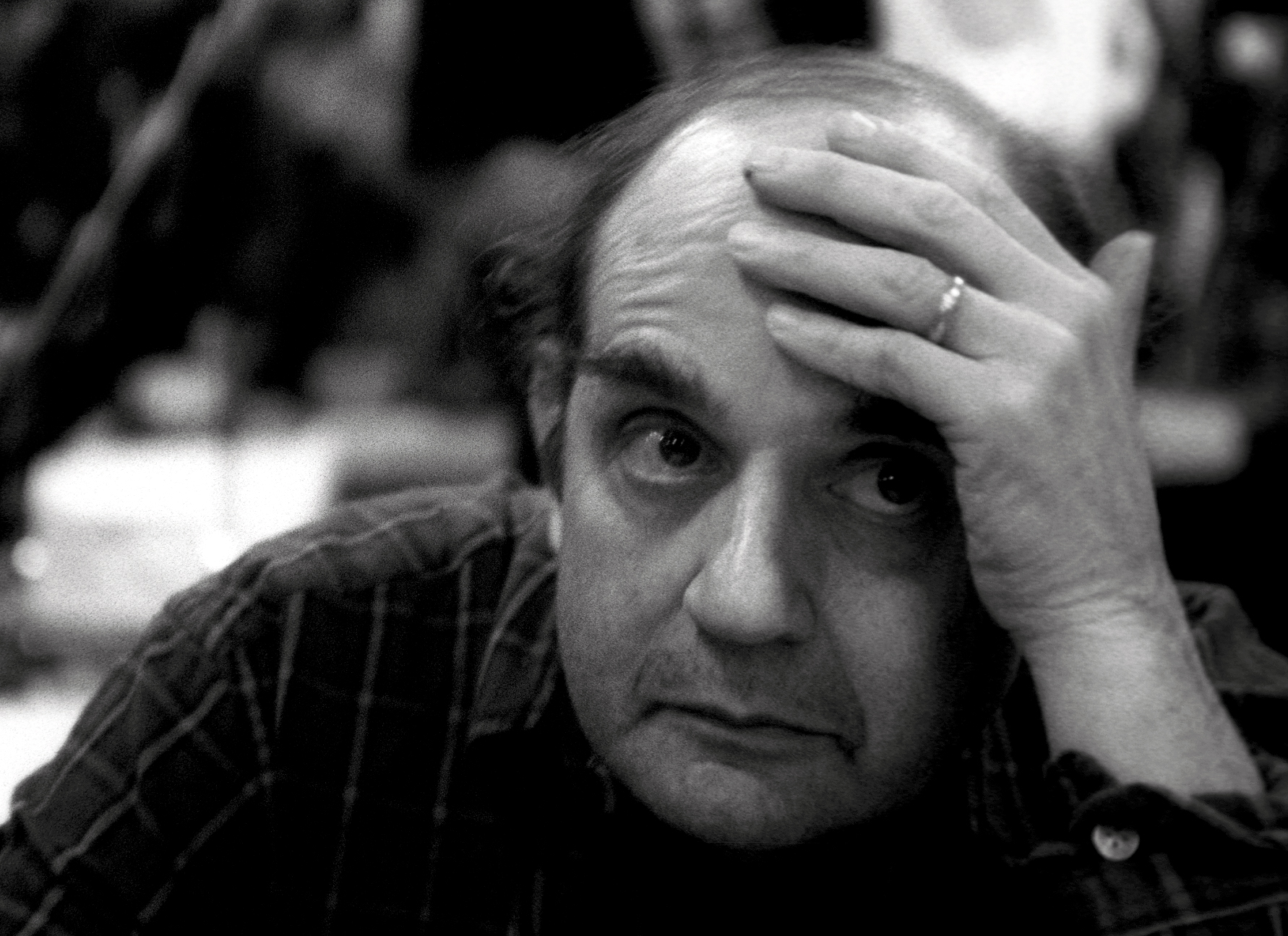
Harvey Pekar at WonderCon 2005, San Francisco

On October 5, 2005, the DC Comics imprint Vertigo published Pekar's autobiographical hardcover The Quitter, with artwork by Dean Haspiel. The book traces Pekar's youth in postwar Cleveland, depicting an angry, insecure teenager who drifts through school, jobs, and relationships while repeatedly abandoning pursuits out of anxiety and fear of failure.

In the years following, Pekar produced a large number of book-length graphic works in rapid succession, often in collaboration with other writers, the editor Paul Buhle, and his long-time American Splendor artist Gary Dumm. These books often focus on biography, history, and reportage rather than the memoir comics with which Pekar had established his reputation.

In 2006, Ballantine/Random House published Pekar's graphic biography Ego & Hubris: The Michael Malice Story, illustrated by Dumm. The book examines the early life and personality of Michael Malice, a Ukrainian-born American writer and founding editor of Overheard in New York. The project grew out of Pekar's personal encounters with Malice — initially adapting his anecdotes into a shorter comic — before expanding into a book-length character study of a figure Pekar found psychologically elusive.

He co-wrote Macedonia (Random House, June 2007) with Heather Roberson, a graphic nonfiction book based on her research and travels in the Balkans. The book examines how the Republic of Macedonia avoided the violent conflicts that accompanied the breakup of Yugoslavia, while also exploring ethnic tensions between Macedonians and Albanians. The work is based on Roberson's field research and interviews, which Pekar adapted into a scripted narrative for comics. It marked Pekar's first major collaboration with Ed Piskor.

He was the principal writer of Students for a Democratic Society: A Graphic History (Hill & Wang, 2008), constructing much of the book's narrative while incorporating contributions from other writers in a volume edited by Buhle. The book, primarily illustrated by Dumm, presents a history of the New Left student movement, tracing the rise and fragmentation of Students for a Democratic Society (SDS) through personal accounts.

Pekar was the principal writer of The Beats: A Graphic History, a collaborative comics history of the Beat Generation — featuring figures such as Jack Kerouac and Allen Ginsberg — illustrated by multiple artists, including Piskor, and edited by Buhle. The book, largely written by Pekar, presents a celebratory and accessible account of the Beats’ lives and cultural impact; it was published in March 2009 by Hill & Wang.

Pekar served as the principal writer and adaptor — collaborating with multiple artists — of a comics treatment of Studs Terkel's seminal 1974 oral history book Working: People Talk About What They Do All Day and How They Feel About What They Do. Studs Terkel's Working: A Graphic Adaptation was published in May 2009 by The New Press; the book was again edited by Buhle.

In the summer of 2009, Pekar started the webcomic The Pekar Project with the online magazine Smith. Edited by Jeff Newelt, the project was conceived as an experimental alternative to American Splendor, featuring new stories by Pekar illustrated by multiple artists, including Tara Seibel, Rick Parker, Joseph Remnant, and Sean Pryor, with stories ranging from brief, abstract pieces to longer narratives. The site also served as a hub for Pekar-related content, including interviews, behind-the-scenes material, and contributions from other collaborators.

=== Critical writing ===
Pekar was an assiduous record collector as well as a freelance book, comic, and jazz critic, writing mainly about significant figures from jazz's golden age but also championing out-of-mainstream artists such as Scott Fields, Fred Frith and Joe Maneri. He published his first criticism in The Jazz Review in 1959. Pekar wrote hundreds of articles for DownBeat, JazzTimes, The Village Voice, and The Austin Chronicle; as well as liner notes for Verve Records and other labels.

Pekar occasionally combined his music writing with his comics writing: during the period 1992–1996, he and Joe Sacco created a series of comics strips for The Village Voice primarily about jazz — the people who played it and the people who lived it. These strips were reformatted and collected in American Splendor: Music Comics, published by Dark Horse in 1997.

Pekar occasionally wrote criticism about the work of other comics creators. For instance, he famously saw Art Spiegelman's use of animals in Maus as potentially reinforcing stereotypes. Pekar was also disdainful of Spiegelman's overwhelmingly negative portrayal of his father in Maus, calling him disingenuous and hypocritical for such a portrayal in a book that presents itself as objective. Pekar furthermore wrote that Maus' portrayal of Poles is unbalanced — that, while some Poles are seen as helping Jews, they are often shown doing so for self-serving reasons. From 1986 to 1990, Pekar had a regular column in the comics anthology Weirdo called "Harvey Sez," in which he wrote about the contemporary comics scene.

He reviewed literary fiction in the Review of Contemporary Fiction. Pekar won awards for his essays broadcast on public radio.

== Theater, music and media appearances ==
Pekar's comic book success led to a guest appearance on Late Night with David Letterman on October 15, 1986. Pekar was invited back repeatedly and made five more appearances in quick succession. These appearances became notable for the increasing hostility and verbal altercations between Pekar and Letterman, particularly on the subject of General Electric's ownership of NBC. The most heated of these was in the August 31, 1988, episode of Late Night, in which Pekar accused Letterman of appearing to be a shill for General Electric and Letterman promised never to invite Pekar back on the show. Despite the ban, more than four years later Pekar appeared on Late Night again — on April 20, 1993, and he made a final appearance on Late Show with David Letterman on May 16, 1994. After Pekar's death, Letterman reflected in 2017 that...

"He was great.... He would just go after stuff. He ... would go after me, he would go after the network, he would go after everything, in a very committed way. It wasn't a gag, it wasn't an act, he would really go to work on you.... [Pekar] was anti-establishment in a way that you don't see guys like that anymore. And that used to really upset me, because I just thought 'Come on Harvey, don't do this to us, just play the game, blah blah blah blah.'... I'm a completely different person now. And I would be so much more better equipped to view the immediate surroundings of that show now, than I was [then].... Now, jeez, I wish I could have had Harvey on every night."

Starting in 1999, Pekar recorded occasional commentaries for the Kent, Ohio, public radio station WKSU, on such topics as his name, turning 60, speeding tickets, Veterans Day, and his appearances on David Letterman's show.

Pekar appeared in Alan Zweig's 2000 documentary film about record collecting, Vinyl. In August 2007, Pekar was featured on the Cleveland episode of Anthony Bourdain: No Reservations with host Anthony Bourdain.

While there had been earlier American Splendor theater adaptations, in 2009, Pekar made his theatrical debut with Leave Me Alone!, a jazz opera for which he wrote the libretto. Leave Me Alone! featured music by Dan Plonsey and was co-produced by Real Time Opera and Oberlin College, premiering at Finney Chapel on January 31, 2009.

In 2009, Pekar was featured in The Cartoonist, a documentary film on the life and work of Jeff Smith, creator of Bone.

== Death and work released posthumously ==
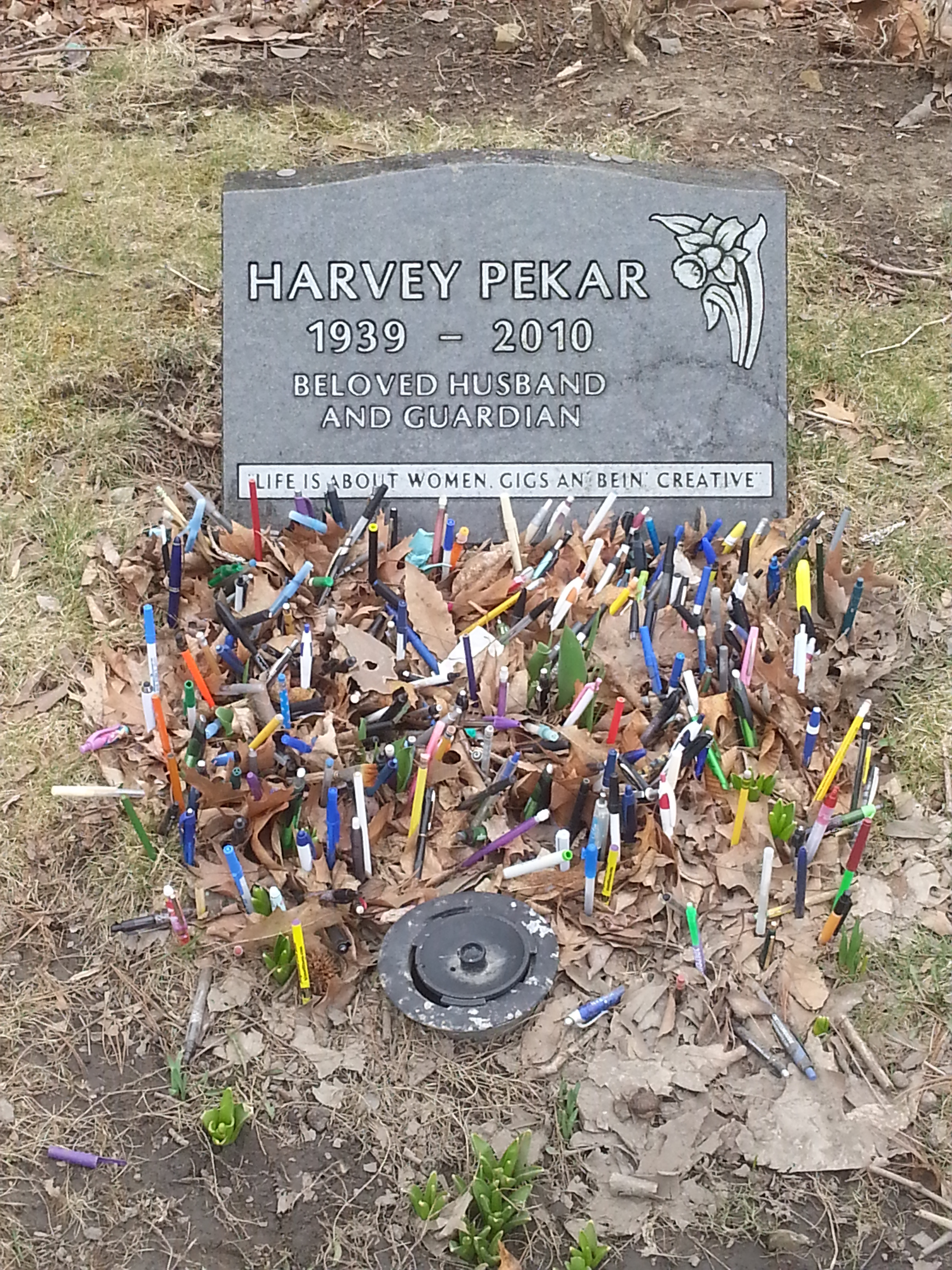
Pekar's grave stone in Lake View Cemetery, Cleveland

Shortly before 1 a.m. on July 12, 2010, Pekar's wife found Pekar dead in their Cleveland Heights, Ohio, home. No immediate cause was determined. In October the Cuyahoga County coroner's office ruled it was an accidental overdose of antidepressants fluoxetine and bupropion. Pekar had been diagnosed with cancer for the third time and was about to undergo treatment.

Pekar was interred at Lake View Cemetery in Cleveland. His headstone features one of his quotations as an epitaph: "Life is about women, gigs an' bein' creative".

In December 2010, the last story Pekar wrote, "Harvey Pekar Meets the Thing", in which Pekar has a conversation with Ben Grimm, was published in the Marvel Comics anthology Strange Tales II; the story was illustrated by Ty Templeton.

Huntington, West Virginia "On the Fly" (Villard, 2011), published posthumously, is a graphic nonfiction collection written by Pekar and illustrated by Summer McClinton. Its title story follows Pekar on a trip to a book festival in Huntington, West Virginia, while the volume's other pieces consist largely of biographical and observational sketches of ordinary people.

Yiddishkeit: Jewish Vernacular and the New Land (Abrams ComicArts, 2011) was also published posthumously It was co-edited by Pekar, Buhle, and Hershl Hartman. Pekar contributed a substantial portion of the book's comics and essays — roughly sixty pages — alongside work by numerous writers and artists, including Dumm and contributors such as Dan Archer and Peter Kuper. The anthology surveys Jewish cultural identity, Yiddish language and literature, and diaspora history, with Pekar's contributions standing out for their focus on working-class life, secular culture, and leftist traditions.

One of Pekar's final graphic memoirs was Harvey Pekar’s Cleveland, illustrated by Joseph Remnant. Tracing Pekar's lifelong relationship with his hometown, the book blends personal anecdotes with local history and cultural commentary. Publishers Weekly described the book as, "a love letter to a city often maligned." The Comics Journal similarly highlighted the book's affectionate tone but suggested that its loosely connected vignettes could feel uneven. Remnant's artwork was noted for its detailed, expressive linework and its evocation of the city's atmosphere.

Pekar's final memoir, also published in 2012, was Not the Israel My Parents Promised Me (Hill & Wang, 2012), written with and illustrated by J. T. Waldman, in which Pekar combines personal narrative with historical and political analysis to examine his changing views on Israel. The book's epilogue was penned by Brabner. Reviews described the book as an ambitious blend of memoir, history, and commentary, praising its intellectual scope while noting its dense, discussion-driven structure. Waldman's artwork was noted for its visually eclectic and symbolic approach, incorporating historical and religious motifs, though some critics observed that the imagery could be overshadowed by the book's text-heavy narrative.

Some other Pekar works were to be released posthumously, including two collaborations with Joyce Brabner — The Big Book of Marriage and Harvey and Joyce Plumb the Depths of Depression — as well as a collection of the webcomics that ran as a part of The Pekar Project. As of 2026, however, none of those projects have yet seen print. Similarly, before he died, Pekar, working with illustrator Summer McClinton, had finished a book on American Marxist Louis Proyect tentatively called The Unrepentant Marxist, after Proyect's blog. In the works since 2008, the book was to be published by Random House. After Pekar's death, and after a conflict between Proyect and Brabner, however, Brabner announced that she would hold the book back indefinitely. Similarly, a dispute between Brabner and Pekar Project illustrator Tara Seibel led to that project also not seeing print.

== Legacy ==
Frequently described as the "poet laureate of Cleveland," Pekar "helped change the appreciation for, and perceptions of, the graphic novel, the drawn memoir, the autobiographical comic narrative."

According to Los Angeles Times columnist David Ulin, American Splendor "remains one of the most compelling and transformative series in the history of comics." In addition, Pekar was the first author to publicly distribute "memoir comic books." While it is common today for people to publicly write about their lives on blogs, social media platforms, and in graphic novels, "In the mid-seventies, Harvey Pekar was doing all this before it was ubiquitous and commercialized."

In October 2012 a statue of Pekar was installed at the Cleveland Heights-University Heights Library, a place he visited almost daily. Mac's Backs, a nearby local bookstore and also a favorite haunt of Pekar's, has an area dedicated to him and his work.

On July 25, 2015, Pekar's hometown of Cleveland Heights dedicated the corner of Northwest Coventry Road and Euclid Heights Boulevard to the life and legacy of Harvey Pekar. This area is now known as Pekar Park.

== Awards ==
- 1986: Inkpot Award
- 1987: American Book Award for American Splendor: The Life and Times of Harvey Pekar
- 1995: Harvey Award Best Graphic Album of Original Work (for Our Cancer Year)
- 2000: PRNDI (Public Radio News Directors Incorporated) Commentary/Essay first prize for the essay, "What's in a Name"
- 2001: RTNDA (Radio-Television News Directors Association) Regional Edward R. Murrow Award for Best Writing for the essay, "Father's Day"
- 2006 Cleveland Arts Prize — Lifetime of Achievement in Literature
- 2011: Eisner Award Hall of Fame

== Bibliography ==
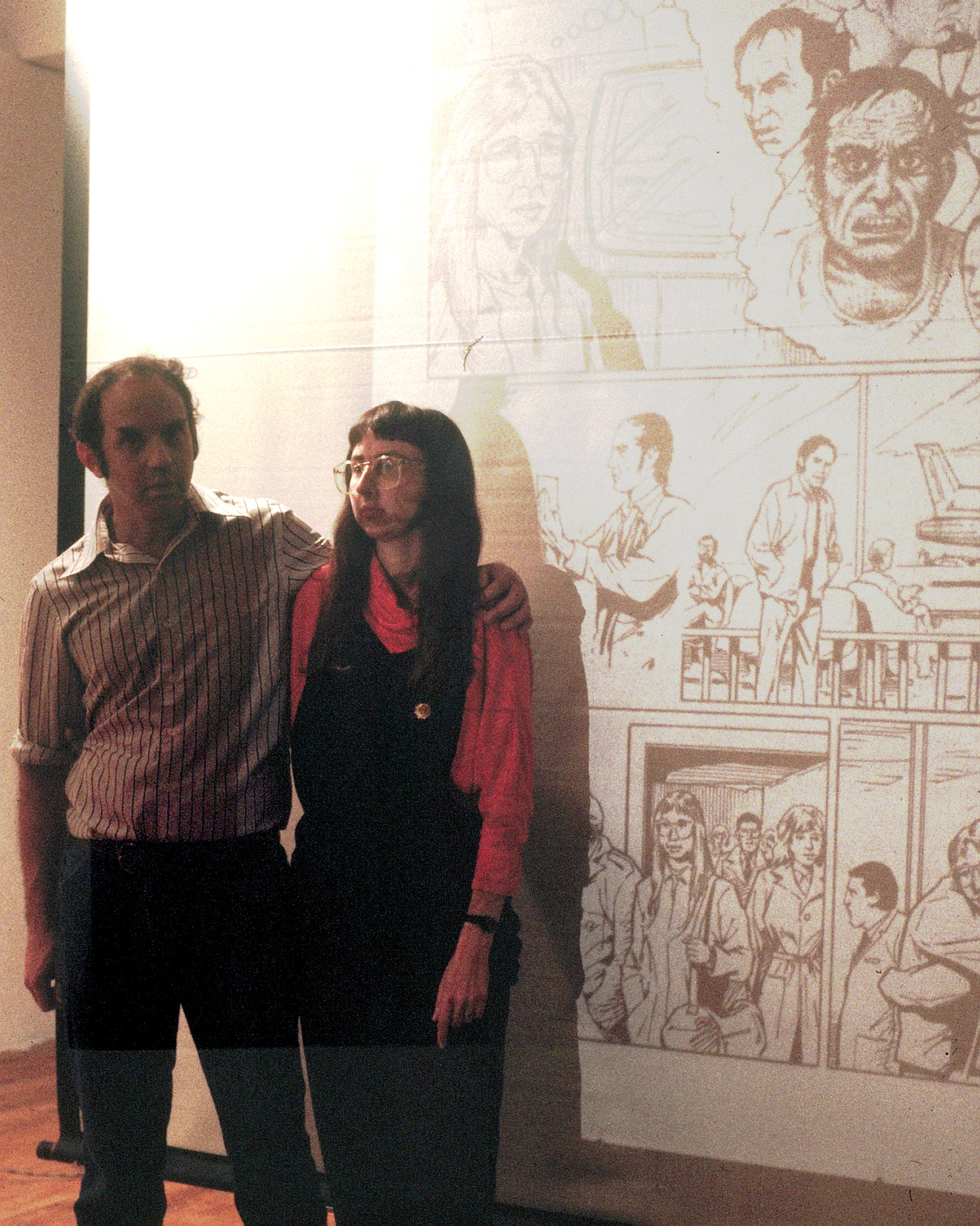
Pekar and Joyce Brabner at Hallwalls, Buffalo, New York (1985)

=== Comics format ===
- American Splendor: The Life and Times of Harvey Pekar (Doubleday, 1986)
- More American Splendor (Doubleday, 1987) ISBN 0-385-24073-2
  - Both above anthologies re-issued in a single volume by Ballantine Books in 2003 ISBN 0-345-46830-9
- The New American Splendor Anthology (Four Walls Eight Windows, 1991) ISBN 0-941423-64-6
- Our Cancer Year, with Joyce Brabner and Frank Stack (Four Walls Eight Windows, 1994) ISBN 1-56858-011-8
- American Splendor Presents: Bob & Harv's Comics, with R. Crumb (Four Walls Eight Windows, 1996) ISBN 1-56858-101-7
- American Splendor: Unsung Hero, with David Collier (Dark Horse Comics, 2003) ISBN 1-59307-040-3
- American Splendor: Our Movie Year (Ballantine Books, 2004) ISBN 0-345-47937-8
- Best of American Splendor (Ballantine Books, 2005) ISBN 0-345-47938-6 Selections from his later, Dark Horse period.
- The Quitter, with Dean Haspiel (DC/Vertigo, 2005) ISBN 1-4012-0399-X
- American Splendor: Ego & Hubris - The Michael Malice Story, with Gary Dumm (Ballantine Books, 2006) ISBN 0-345-47939-4
- Macedonia, with Heather Roberson and Ed Piskor (Ballantine Books, 2006) ISBN 0-345-49899-2
- American Splendor: Another Day (DC/Vertigo, 2007) ISBN 978-1-4012-1235-3
- Students for a Democratic Society: A Graphic History, edited by Paul Buhle, with art (mostly) by Gary Dumm (Hill & Wang, 2008) ISBN 978-0-8090-9539-1
- American Splendor: Another Dollar (DC/Vertigo, 2009) ISBN 978-1-4012-2173-7
- The Beats: A Graphic History, mostly by Pekar with contributions by other writers (including Joyce Brabner). Art mostly by Ed Piskor, with additional art by Jay Kinney, Nick Thorkelson, Summer McClinton, Peter Kuper, Mary Fleener, Gary Dumm, Lance Tooks, Jeffrey Lewis, and others. Edited by Paul Buhle (Hill & Wang, 2009) ISBN 978-0-285-63858-7
- Studs Terkel's Working: A Graphic Adaptation, edited by Paul Buhle . With art by Sharon Rudahl, Terry LaBan, Gary Dumm, Peter Gullerud, Pablo G. Callejo, et al. (The New Press, 2009) ISBN 978-1-59558-321-5

==== Published posthumously ====
- Huntington, West Virginia: "On the Fly", illustrated by Summer McClinton (Villard, April 2011) ISBN 978-0-345-49941-7
- Yiddishkeit: Jewish Vernacular and the New Land, co-edited with Paul Buhle. With art by Barry Deutsch, Peter Kuper, Spain Rodriguez, Sharon Rudahl, et al. (Harry N. Abrams, Sept. 2011) ISBN 978-0-8109-9749-3
- Harvey Pekar's Cleveland, illustrated by Joseph Remnant. Introduction by Alan Moore. Edited by Jeff Newelt (Zip Comics and Top Shelf Productions, May 2012) ISBN 978-1-60309-091-9
- Not the Israel My Parents Promised Me, illustrated by JT Waldman. Epilogue by Joyce Brabner. (Hill & Wang, July 2012) ISBN 978-0-8090-9482-0

=== Prose ===
- Circus Parade by Jim Tully. Foreword by Harvey Pekar. Introduction by Paul J. Bauer and Mark Dawidziak. (Kent State Univ. Press, 2009) 978-1-60635-001-0
