= Our Cancer Year =

Nonfiction graphic novel by Harvey Pekar and Joyce Brabner

- The cover of Our Cancer Year. Harvey has collapsed in the snow in front of their house. Joyce says to him, "Harvey... forget about the groceries, honey. Let's get you inside first." Art by Frank Stack.
- Author: Harvey Pekar; Joyce Brabner
- Illustrator: Frank Stack
- Language: English
- Subject: Cancer, Relationships, Politics
- Genre: Nonfiction, Autobiography
- Published: October 13, 1994
- Publisher: Four Walls Eight Windows/Running Press
- Media type: Print (paperback)
- Pages: 252
- Awards: Harvey Award for best original graphic novel, 1995
- ISBN: 978-1568580111

Our Cancer Year is a nonfiction graphic novel written by Harvey Pekar and Joyce Brabner, and illustrated by Frank Stack.

== Overview ==
Published in 1994 by Four Walls Eight Windows, Our Cancer Year (an offshoot of the cult favorite comic book series American Splendor) relates the story of Pekar's harrowing yet successful treatment struggle to overcome lymphoma, as well as serving as a social commentary on events of that year. Co-author Brabner described it as a "book about activism and cancer and being married and buying a house, about being sick at a time when we feel the whole world is sick." It was, says Brabner, written "together from our different points of view, in the different way we experienced Harvey's illness."

In a contemporaneous review, Publishers Weekly described the book this way:

In 1990, Pekar was diagnosed with lymphoma and needed chemotherapy. By the time the disease was discovered, the couple was in the midst of buying a house (a tremendous worry to Pekar, who fretted about both the money and corruptions of bourgeois creature comforts). Brabner, a self-described "comic book journalist," had to oversee both the new house and a sick and very difficult husband. Pekar's cancer treatment and suffering will take your breath away, but there's a happy ending; and the book (and their marriage) is distinguished by Brabner's great tenderness and determination in the middle of Pekar's medical nightmare. Stack's brisk and elegantly gestural black-and-white drawings wonderfully delineate this captivating story of love, community, recuperation and international friendship.

Pekar and Brabner discussed their unusual domestic/creative partnership in an article in the Los Angeles Times:

They're an odd couple, Pekar and Brabner. They quibble constantly, with Brabner interrupting or berating Pekar for seemingly every other thought, while he sighs in resignation and moans "Yeah, sure, Joyce, whatever you say," in his most condescending tone. The book is scripted in the same fractious manner. "We wrote the book in the same voice we use when we tell people what happened," Brabner said. "We step on each other's lines, we interrupt each other, we contradict each other. That's the way it is. The book sounds like the way we talk."

Our Cancer Year won the 1995 Harvey Award for best original graphic novel.

The creation of Our Cancer Year and many elements of its story were incorporated into the 2003 film American Splendor, based on the life and career of Pekar and his relationship with Brabner.

== Legacy ==
In 2011, Purdue University's Cancer, Culture and Community program published Lafayette: Our Cancer Year, a 141-page book inspired by Our Cancer Year. Edited by Rosanne Altstatt, the book featured true stories by "cancer patients, survivors, caregivers, friends and relatives" from the Lafayette-West Lafayette community. Brabner wrote the book's introduction.
