= Joyce Brabner =

American writer and editor (1952–2024)

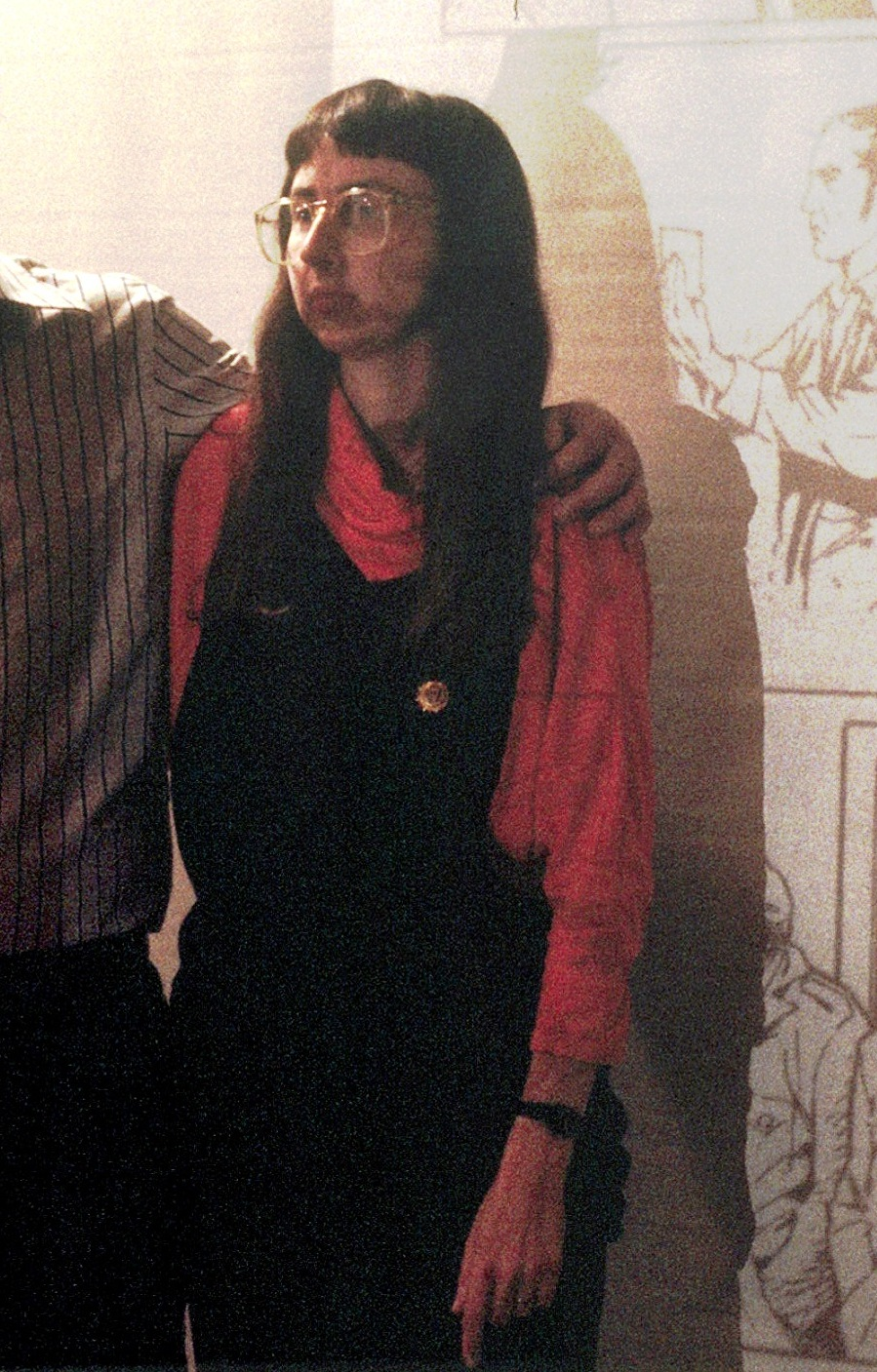
- Brabner in 1985
- Born: March 1, 1952
- Died: August 2, 2024 (aged 72)
- Occupation: Writer
- Spouse: Harvey Pekar (m. 1983; died 2010)
- Writing career
- Notable works: Real War Stories; Brought to Light; Our Cancer Year; Second Avenue Caper
- Notable awards: Harvey Award (1995); Inkpot Award (2011); Lambda Literary Award (2014)

Joyce Brabner (March 1, 1952 – August 2, 2024) was an American writer of political comics and wife of Harvey Pekar; with whom she co-wrote the nonfiction graphic novel Our Cancer Year.

== Biography ==
Brabner was born on March 1, 1952, and grew up "poor" in Wilmington, Delaware, in a household with six younger siblings. "[B]ooks were a source of sustenance" and she recalled "read[ing] comics when I was five or six years old – including Mad magazine", her first exposure to political satire. Drifting away from comics as she grew older and discovering that "for the same amount of money I could get on the bus and go down to the library," she nevertheless remembered "a lot of what I'd read."

Living "in Delaware working with people in prison, with kids in trouble," running a non-profit culture-based support program for inmates in the Delaware correctional system, Brabner was a founder and manager of "The Rondo Hatton Center for the Deforming Arts," a small theater space in Wilmington. (Hatton played horror roles – The Creeper – in the early 1940s without makeup because he was severely disfigured by a glandular disease.)

During this time, Brabner became friendly with "two sometime artists who were very involved in comic fandom," which "seemed like a lot of fun." Feeling burned out from "working with courts, with sexual abusers of children and so on," Brabner began working with Tom Watkins, who "was doing a lot of costumes for the Phil Seuling comic shows." Moonlighting "as a costumer while continuing to work in the prison programs [she] had organized on [her] own," while not spending much time at conventions or comic shops, she nevertheless eventually became co-owner, with Watkins and Craig Dawson, of a Wilmington comic book (and theatrical costumes) store called Xanadu Comics & Collectables, Inc.

Her store stocked Harvey Pekar's American Splendor, but when the store "ran out of an issue" (one of Brabner's partners selling the last copy of American Splendor #6 without her getting a chance to read it), Brabner sent Pekar a postcard directly, asking for a copy, and the two "began to correspond." Developing a phone relationship, after a stay in the hospital by Brabner, Pekar spoke to her daily and sent her a collection of old records.

=== Harvey Pekar ===
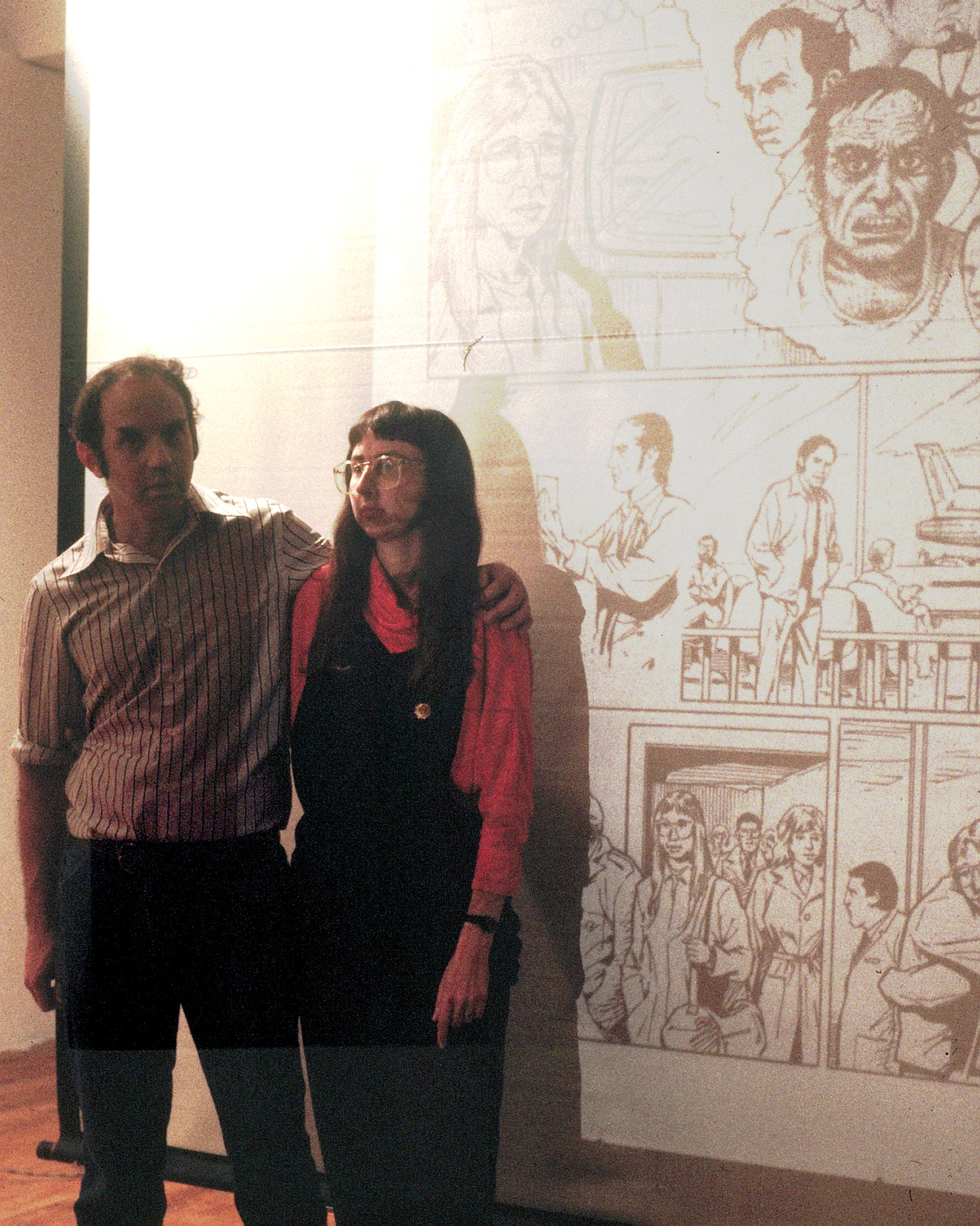
Pekar and Brabner in 1985

Brabner recalled that she was:

"flying out to his [Pekar's] part of the country on other business, and decided to visit him, and the next day we decided to get married!"

On their second date, they bought rings, and the third date they tied the knot. With the benefit of hindsight, she believes that it was Pekar's honesty that attracted her to him, crediting his work on "American Splendor [for giving her] a worm's-eye view of what his other marriages were like," allowing for a greater degree of understanding and openness between the two of them. It was Brabner's second marriage and Pekar's third.

As Pekar's third wife, she appeared as a character in many of his American Splendor stories, as well as helping package and publish the various iterations of the comic. Citing her "talent for publicity," Brabner recalled that American Splendor was losing money and decided (having "stopped working for the prison program") to engage in some "screwball publicity." Utilising her costume-making skills, she

"started cutting up some of his [Pekar's] old clothes and making little Harvey Pekar dolls; just like the Shroud of Turin, they were made with clothing actually worn by the author, like some holy relic. They were these odd collectibles, and I carried these ugly little dolls around at our first San Diego con together."

The gimmick worked, and they "picked up nine distributors for the book!" The comic began to be profitable, and one of Brabner's dolls "ended up on The David Letterman Show." She still made them occasionally for charity auctions.

In 1990, Pekar was diagnosed with lymphoma, and Brabner became his full-time caretaker, evolving from providing hands-on physical care to full-scale emotional and logistical management of his life. She devoted herself completely to his care — managing the effects of chemotherapy, staying close through difficult nights, and suppressing her own distress so as not to upset him. Even after Pekar was declared cancer-free, his mental health worsened, with his bouts of depression sometimes intensifying into anxiety and paranoia.

In 1996, Brabner and Pekar became connected to a young girl, Danielle Batone, the eight-year-old daughter of a struggling local cartoonist. They became Danielle's foster parents in 1998, and Brabner spent the next years devoting herself to Danielle's upbringing. Danielle became a recurring character in American Splendor, alongside Pekar's diverse cast of family and friends.

In 2002, Pekar was diagnosed with cancer for the second time. Combined with the release of the American Splendor film in 2003, Brabner's responsibilities increased. Pekar experienced severe depressive episodes, accidental overdoses, and psychiatric hospitalizations, and Brabner took on a significant role in managing his care and access to him. She also sought to protect his ability to continue working by limiting how widely details of his condition were shared. That role carried through to Pekar's final overdose and death in 2010.

Following Pekar's death, Brabner played a central role in managing his literary estate and posthumous publications. In this role, Brabner oversaw four Pekar projects that were published: Yiddishkeit: Jewish Vernacular and the New Land (Harry N. Abrams, 2011), Huntington, West Virginia: "On the Fly" (Villard, 2011), Not the Israel My Parents Promised Me (Hill & Wang, 2012), and Harvey Pekar's Cleveland (Zip Comics and Top Shelf Productions, 2012). Brabner, however, also blocked at least two projects from being published. Pekar (and illustrator Summer McClinton) had finished a book on American Marxist Louis Proyect tentatively called The Unrepentant Marxist (after Proyect's blog). In the works since 2008, the book was to be published by Random House. In 2012, after a conflict between Proyect and Brabner, Brabner announced that she would hold the book back indefinitely. Similarly, Brabner's dispute with illustrator Tara Seibel led to The Pekar Project (Smith Magazine, 2009–2010) not seeing print. Seibel, a Cleveland-based artist, had worked extensively with Pekar in the last two years of his life on The Pekar Project, a webcomic alternative to American Splendor, which featured new stories by Pekar illustrated by multiple artists in addition to Seibel. The New York Times reported that Brabner opposed Seibel's continued participation in the project as well as certain other posthumous works.

=== Death ===
Brabner died on August 2, 2024, at the age of 72. The cause was cancer.

== Comics writing ==
In addition to Pekar and American Splendor, Brabner worked with many of independent comics' highest-profile writers and artists.

=== Real War Stories ===
Brabner edited Eclipse Comics' Real War Stories (2 issues, 1987, 1991), which brought Mike W. Barr, Steve Bissette, Brian Bolland, Paul Mavrides, Dean Motter, Denny O'Neil and John Totleben (among others) together on behalf of the Central Committee for Conscientious Objectors and Citizen Soldier.

Lou Ann Merkle, "an art student and activist living in Cleveland" began working with the Central Committee for Conscientious Objectors, a "military and draft counseling organization," and sought out Pekar for advice on the costs involved in creating a comic. Seeking "a tool to reach teenagers with information about the military" in the face of the peacetime draft and what she saw as an "aggressive recruiting campaign" (aided by the release of Top Gun in 1986). Brabner recalls that Merkle was looking for some "counterpropaganda, a way of presenting some of the things the recruiters weren't telling the kids about the draft," including the stories of "veterans and people from El Salvador."

Although Merkle had only budgeted for a black-and-white comic, Brabner felt strongly "that color was necessary if they were going to reach the kids", preferably with "popular artists and writers," but "realized with the integrity and honesty the undergrounds had." Brabner, Merkle, and the CCCO managed to find in Eclipe a publisher willing to split the costs of printing, were given "some grant funding," and found some creators willing to defer their pay. After publication, the CCCO took on the responsibility of distributing the comic – Real War Stories – including getting copies "into some schools [where] they were used in classrooms".

This drew the attention of the Department of Defense and the Department of Justice after an Atlanta newspaper objected strongly to the "presence of Real War Stories" at a "high school 'career day'." Pressure from "different people from around the country" caused the school to tell the Atlanta Peace Alliance and the CCCO that "they couldn't [attend the career day], prompting the APA and CCCO to file a suit against the school."

At the hearing, the Department of Defense "offered an expert witness" who labeled the contents of Real War Stories as being "all made up", despite Brabner's assertion that not only were they "all autobiographical stories", but that personally "participated in all the interviews [which]... were all carefully documented." During one courtroom exchange, Brabner recalls that they "had military Naval court records" supporting the truth of some of the autobiographical comics stories, and when the case was continued, the "CCCO got a letter from the Department of Defense essentially withdrawing the complaint."

Eclipse published a second issue of Real War Stories in 1991.

=== Brought to Light ===
Her writing on Brought to Light with Alan Moore and artist Bill Sienkiewicz brought critical praise from both the artistic and activist communities. Originally a joint publishing venture between Eclipse Comics and Warner Books, the 1989 graphic novel flip book Brought to Light dealt in part with the Central Intelligence Agency's involvement in the Iran–Contra affair. The impetus behind Brought to Light was the involvement of the Christic Institute ("a public-interest legal firm, best known at that time for its work on the Karen Silkwood case") in a case "involving the bombing of a press conference in Costa Rica." Survivors of the bombing who had investigated "found," says Brabner "it involved much broader issues involving covert operations [and] possible swaps of drugs for arms."

Stymied in initial attempts to bring the matter to court, the initial investigators required an outside organization, bringing in the Christic Institute. "People at Christic had seen Real War Stories #1" and in trying to raise funds to investigate and document facts and allegations surrounding the "very complicated" story, turned to Brabner "and asked if I could communicate this very complex story in comic book form." Faced with "two ways the stories could be told," Brabner remembers she decided to utilize both.

I decided to tell these stories in two different ways, as a "topsy-turvy" format comic book. A number of people in comics were too afraid to be involved with the project, but Alan Moore had a story in Real War No. 1 and I knew we could work together, and he took it on. I wrote the other.

Warner Books "was interested in the project from the beginning," thinking that they could be involved from the start in a book on the Iran-Contra affair, which could, says Brabner, have been "as big as Watergate." Caution overtook enthusiasm, however, when "it became clear that this story was a lot bigger than everybody thought it was." Although thoroughly scrutinised – and Brabner says that she "was told at the time by Warner's attorneys that our sources were solid and our book would fly" – she believes that Warner "realized this wasn't going to be the enormous trial, or victory, they thought it would be." Ultimately, Brought to Light was published solely by Eclipse.

=== Other works ===
Brabner, talking in the early 1990s, described the difficulties involved in "publish[ing] non-fiction, public interest comics," which entail "go[ing] outside the world of comic book publishing," and often relying on "grant money." Even with funding in place, however, she described the difficulty in finding "a publisher willing to take on a reprinting of the Martin Luther King comic Al Capp Studios packaged [Martin Luther King and the Montgomery Story]," which was cited as an inspiration by one of the four students who began the February 1960 "non-violent sit-in demonstration" in Greensboro, North Carolina. Brabner refers to this event as particularly highlighting "the historical role of comics in social and political arenas," and (with American Splendor) "play[ing] a vital role in Joyce's decision to build upon her work in prisons and schools, to apply the medium to controversial investigative ventures." Together, and separately, Pekar and Brabner "have [both] tenaciously pursued a path dedicated to the truths of the human condition, contrary to the lurid escapist fantasies that fuel the main engines of the comic book industry."

Indeed, in the Stephen R. Bissette/Stanley Wiater-edited Comic Book Rebels, the editors draw a distinction between Pekar's stories – which are "primarily by himself and about himself" — and Brabner, who "uses her own experiences to frame broader investigative narratives about America, and the impact our social, political, and military institutions have upon not only ourselves but the world."

She also wrote Activists!, which was commissioned, and then canceled, by the Fellowship of Reconciliation, but later published by Stabur Press; and the PETA-supported Animal Rights Comics, both of which illustrated by Mark Badger (among others) — as well as working on Strip AIDS (1987–1988) and a book called Cambodia, USA (never published).

In 1994, Pekar and Brabner collaborated with artist Frank Stack on the Harvey Award-winning graphic novel Our Cancer Year.The project was, according to Brabner, planned to be a "book about activism and cancer and being married and buying a house, about being sick at a time when we feel the whole world is sick." It takes the reader through Pekar's struggles with lymphoma, as well as serving as a social commentary on events of that year, and was, said Brabner, written "together from our different points of view, in the different way we experienced Harvey's illness."

She and Pekar later published work in Jason Rodriguez's "Postcards" series, as well as an anthology (with Pekar, Ed Piskor and others) called The Beats (Farrar, Straus and Giroux, 2008).

With Pekar, she co-authored and appeared as herself in an opera performed by Real Time Opera in January 2009; the event was broadcast on the Internet from Oberlin College on January 31, 2009.

She helped finish and publish two of Pekar's posthumously published works, Harvey Pekar's Cleveland (Zip Comics/Top Shelf Productions, 2012) and Not the Israel My Parents Promised Me, (Farrar, Straus and Giroux, July 2014). In addition, Brabner's 2014 nonfiction comic book Second Avenue Caper: When Goodfellas, Divas, and Dealers Plotted Against the Plague was given the Lambda Literary Award for "LGBT Graphic Novel" at the 27th Lambda Literary Awards in 2015. Illustrated by Mark Zingarelli, the book was published by Hill & Wang.

From 2015 to 2018 Brabner performed in storytelling and comedy shows that also featured Kevin Meaney, Marina Franklin, Lydia Lunch, Aparna Nancherla, Nonye Brown-West, and Cassie J. Sneider. These shows took place at Ralph's Rock Diner (Worcester, Massachusetts) and venues in and near Boston. The shows were produced and hosted by comedian Matthew Flynn, and the shows were often called Guerrilla Theatre or Thought Bomb.

After writing the foreword for Joe Biel's memoir, Good Trouble: Building a Successful Life and Business with Autism, Brabner published The Courage Party: Helping Our Resilient Children Understand and Survive Sexual Assault with Biel's press Microcosm Publishing in 2020 (co-authored with her foster daughter Danielle Batone). At the time of her death, Biel and Brabner had been planning to reissue out-of-print books and new posthumous comic books from Pekar and other unreleased work.

== Awards ==
In 1995, Brabner and Pekar shared a Harvey Award (named after cartoonist Harvey Kurtzman) for "Best Original Graphic Novel" for Our Cancer Year. In 2011, Brabner was awarded an Inkpot Award in recognition of her work in comics. Second Avenue Caper: When Goodfellas, Divas, and Dealers Plotted Against the Plague won the 2015 Lambda Literary Award.

== In popular culture ==
Brabner was portrayed by actress Hope Davis in the film adaptation of American Splendor (2003), and also appeared as herself in some scenes. Davis' performance was met with critical acclaim, and she was nominated for the Golden Globe Award for Best Supporting Actress – Motion Picture.

Brabner appeared as herself in the 2015 documentary Call Me Lucky, being interviewed about comedian and fellow activist Barry Crimmins.

== Select bibliography ==
- Real War Stories (2 issues, Eclipse Comics, 1987, 1991)
- Brought to Light (Eclipse Comics, 1989) ISBN 0-913035-67-X
- Our Cancer Year (Four Walls Eight Windows/Running Press, 1994) — co-written with Harvey Pekar; illustrated by Frank Stack
- Activists! (Stabur Press, 1995) — with art by Wayne Vansant and Mark Badger
- Animal Rights Comics (2 issues, Stabur Press, 1996) — illustrated by Mark Badger; benefit comics for People for the Ethical Treatment of Animals
- Second Avenue Caper: When Goodfellas, Divas, and Dealers Plotted Against the Plague (Hill & Wang, 2014) — illustrated by Mark Zingarelli
- The Courage Party: Helping Our Resilient Children Understand and Survive Sexual Assault (an "American Splendor Family" book) (Microcosm Publishing, 2020) — written with Danielle Batone; illustrated by Greta Oparaku
