= Wayne Alan Harold =

American film director

- Born: November 7, 1964 (age 61); Ohio, U.S.
- Education: B.A., Kent State University (1988)
- Occupations: filmmaker, editor, publisher
- Known for: Townies
- Website: waynealanharold.com

Wayne Alan Harold (born November 7, 1964) is an American independent editor, publisher and filmmaker who lives in Kent, Ohio. During his career he has formed lasting creative relationships with both Toby Radloff and P. Craig Russell.

Harold is a 1988 graduate of Kent State University with a degree in communications and film. Soon after graduating from Kent State, Harold began producing short comedic segments for MTV about Cleveland-based "genuine nerd" Toby Radloff. In the 1990s, Harold co-created the cult horror comedy feature films Killer Nerd and Bride of Killer Nerd, both of which starred Radloff. He continued working with Radloff in the 1999 cult film Townies, and then the 2006 documentary Genuine Nerd.

Harold's 2009 documentary, Night Music: The Art of P. Craig Russell, has had public screenings at the Cleveland Museum of Art and the Wexner Center for the Arts in Columbus. In 2012, he created the first volume of P. Craig Russell’s Guide to Graphic Storytelling, an educational video series that teaches effective sequential storytelling techniques. Five follow-up volumes were subsequently produced.

Harold is the founder of the Kent Comic Arts Fest in Kent, Ohio. The debut event was held at Kent State University on October 19, 2013. Guests included P. Craig Russell, Jill Thompson and other artists of the graphic novel adaptation of Neil Gaiman's The Graveyard Book.

In 2015, he edited, designed and published the P. Craig Russell Sketchbook Archives, a hardcover coffee-table style art book featuring career-spanning sketch work by artist P. Craig Russell.

In 2017, Harold launched a series of Fine Art Editions, featuring oversized 12"x17" Artist's Edition-type hardcover books that feature comic art pages printed the same size as the original art board (and scanned from the original art wherever possible). The initial volume in the series was P. Craig Russell's Jungle Book and Other Stories. It was followed by P. Craig Russell's Salome and Other Stories, P. Craig Russell's The Selfish Giant and Other Stories and P. Craig Russell's Symbolist Fantasies and Other Things.

== Filmography ==
Year	Title	Role	Notes
1991	Killer Nerd	Co-director, co-writer, co-producer	Starring Toby Radloff and Lori Scarlett
1992	Bride of Killer Nerd	Co-director, writer, co-producer	Starring Toby Radloff and Lori Scarlett
1993	Girlfriends	Co-director, writer co-producer	Starring P. Craig Russell and Lori Scarlett
1999	Townies	Director, writer, producer, cinematographer, editor	Starring Toby Radloff and Lori Scarlett
2006	Genuine Nerd	Director, producer, cinematographer, editor	Documentary on Toby Radloff
2009	Night Music The Art of P. Craig Russell	Director, producer, cinematographer, editor	Documentary on P. Craig Russell
2012–2016	P. Craig Russell's Guide to Graphic Storytelling	Director, producer, cinematographer, editor	6-volume educational video series featuring P. Craig Russell
2023	All-New Brevities	Director, writer, producer, cinematographer, editor	Series of short comedy films including Goat Night and With Apologies to Andy Warhol
2026	Into The Dreaming City	Director, producer, cinematographer, editor	Documentary with P Craig Russell discussing his work on the classic Marvel graphic novel
2026	From Heck It Came	Director, writer, producer, cinematographer, editor	Mockumentary web series about 1950s & 1960s B movies hosted by Toby Radloff: films covered include From Hell it Came, The Black Scorpion, and Attack of the 50 Foot Woman
