= Killer Nerd =

- Directed by: Mark Steven Bosko; Wayne Alan Harold
- Written by: Mark Steven Bosko; Wayne Alan Harold
- Produced by: Lurid Entertainment
- Starring: Toby Radloff
- Production company: Riot
- Distributed by: Troma Entertainment
- Release date: 1991
- Running time: 90 min
- Country: United States
- Language: English
- Budget: $12,000

Killer Nerd is a 1991 comedy horror film. It was directed by Mark Steven Bosko and Wayne Alan Harold and stars Toby Radloff in his first film.

The film's protagonist is a lonely nerd who has an unrequited love for a female co-worker. Within a few days, he is rejected by his love interest, he gets bullied by both a male co-worker and two acquaintances who work as drug dealers, he is fooled by two new female acquaintances, and he is re-acquainted with his abusive mother. The nerd eventually snaps and goes on a killing spree, targeting all his enemies.

== Plot ==
The film opens with a dream sequence of Harold Kunkle (Toby Radloff) in which a Dream Girl (Mimsel Dendak) dances around. Harold wakes up and it is shown that he is a lonely, socially awkward nerd. He goes to work and on the way there is harassed by TJ (Niko DePofi) and Leelee (Tony Zanoni), two punk drug dealers.

Harold has a crush on Sally (Heidi Lohr), a co-worker of his, and when he asks her out on a date, she makes up an excuse not to go. Harold is also harassed by another co-worker, Jeff (Richard Zaynor), who is shown to be a love interest of Sally. Harold visits his overbearing mother, Helen, toward whom he clearly harbors resentment.

Harold sees an ad on TV for a tape collection on how to be cool and orders it. When it arrives, he follows the steps and then goes to a salon for a makeover. He gets a new hairdo and then buys flowers to win over Sally, but when he arrives at her house, he sees her in bed with Jeff. He gives up on Sally and goes to a nightclub where he meets Jenny (Lori Scarlett) and Lilac (Elizabeth Quinn), two punks who dance with him. They behave kindly towards him and take him with them to buy marijuana from their friends. They go to an abandoned factory, and it is revealed that the friends are TJ and Leelee, the punks who bullied Harold before. The two tell him they are taking him with them to go on a beer run, but then beat him up.

Sad and angry, Harold goes home and snaps. He then creates a plan and sets out to get revenge on his bullies. First, he goes back to Sally's house, where he pretends to be a cat to lure Jeff outside. When Jeff gets outside, Harold cuts his head off. He goes inside to Sally and throws Jeff's severed head on her bed before throwing acid in her face. Next, he goes to his mother's house. There he ties her up and it is revealed that she let Harold's stepfather beat him. He makes her drink bleach and chops her head with a cleaver.

Finally, Harold returns to the factory to kill the punks and begins to pick them off one by one. He stabs Lilac to death, then knocks Jenny out and slices her stomach open. He knocks both TJ and Leelee unconscious. TJ and Leelee wake up tied up in an abandoned infirmary with dynamite strapped to their heads. Harold comes out and makes TJ say he is a "sissy boy" just as he and Leelee had done to him before. He blows up TJ and Leelee's heads and laughs, having gotten his revenge. The film ends with a shot of the dream girl from the beginning lying dead on the floor.

== Production ==
The film was produced with $12,000 and was frequently rented in major film rental stores. Troma Entertainment bought the rights to the film. It was filmed in Ravenna, Ohio, with a prosumer grade camcorder.

=== Sequel ===
A sequel titled Bride of Killer Nerd was released in 1992.

== Reception ==
A TV Guide review said, "The story is so empty that it doesn't really end; it just runs out of people to kill". Bill Gibron, writing for DVD Verdict, said that the film "is a certifiable classic, a perfectly executed premise of such outrageous originality that it's amazing no one had thought of doing it before". Ian Jane, of DVD Talk, said that this film and its sequel are "typical bad horror-comedy hybrids" which are "quite dull", but went on to say that "while the movies are pretty much bottom of the barrel entertainment, they do have their own special kind of retarded charm". A review of Bride of Killer Nerd in VideoHound's Cult Flicks & Trash Pics said that, along with Killer Nerd, the film "deserves your neglect".

== Home media ==
The movie was released on VHS in the early 90's and was very popular in video rental stores.

The film was released on DVD in 2004, in a double feature with its sequel on one disc. The special features are two commentaries, an interview, four trailers, promo videos, and a music video.

A Blu-Ray recently got released.

== In popular culture ==
In 2010, musician James Ferraro released a song based on the film, titled "Killer Nerd", which appeared on his album Night Dolls with Hairspray.
