= Frank Stack =

American cartoonist (1937–2026)

- Born: October 31, 1937 Houston, Texas, U.S.
- Died: April 12, 2026 (aged 88) Columbia, Missouri, U.S.
- Areas: Cartoonist, printmaker, painter
- Pseudonym: Foolbert Sturgeon
- Notable works: The Adventures of Jesus; Our Cancer Year
- Awards: Harvey Award, 1995; Haxtur Award, Artist That We Love, 2006; Inkpot Award, 2011
- Spouse: Mildred Roberta "Robbie" Powell (m. 1959; died 1998)

Frank Huntington Stack (October 31, 1937 – April 12, 2026) was an American underground cartoonist and artist. Working under the name Foolbert Sturgeon to avoid persecution for his work while living in the Bible Belt, Stack published what is considered by many to be the first underground comic, The Adventures of Jesus, in 1964.

Stack's main artistic influences were Gustave Doré, Roy Crane, and V. T. Hamlin. He is widely known as a printmaker, specializing in etchings and lithographs, and his sketchy comics style evokes Stack's background as an etcher. (His technique of creating etchings on-site was featured in American Artist magazine.) His oil paintings and watercolors mostly feature landscape and figure compositions. He was a longtime professor at the University of Missouri.

== Early life, education and teaching career ==
Stack was born on October 31, 1937. He graduated from the University of Texas at Austin with a BFA in 1959. He received his M.A. at the University of Wyoming, and also studied at the School of the Art Institute of Chicago and the Académie de la Grande Chaumière of Paris.

He was a long-time professor of art at the University of Missouri, where he taught from 1963 to 2001, moving on to professor emeritus status. In addition, he did teaching stints at Appalachian State and Virginia Tech.

== Comics ==
While at the University of Texas, Stack joined the staff of The Texas Ranger student humor magazine in 1957, and was editor of the magazine in 1958–1959. As editor, Stack aspired for the Ranger to emulate the humor exemplified by The New Yorker and Punch. He published comic strips by fellow UT student Gilbert Shelton, later known for Wonder Wart-Hog and The Fabulous Furry Freak Brothers.

Soon after graduating from UT, Stack entered the U.S. Army, stationed at Governors Island, New York, in 1961–1962.

Although he had already graduated in 1959, starting in 1962, (using the pen-name Foolbert Sturgeon) he published The Adventures of Jesus in The Texas Ranger (as well as early counterculture publications like The Austin Iconoclastic and The Charlatan). In 1964, then Texas Ranger editor Gilbert Shelton collected about a dozen of the Jesus strips, designed a cover, and made 50 photocopies of the collection, giving them to associates around the UT campus.

Stack's most prolific period as a cartoonist was in the late 1960s and early 1970s. During this period, Rip Off Press (co-founded by Shelton and fellow UT cartoonist Jaxon) published three issues of Stack's Jesus Comics, as well as such solo titles as Feelgood Funnies and Amazon Comics. In 1972 Stack contributed to The Rip Off Review of Western Culture with "Jesus Goes To The Faculty Party." In addition to publishing several articles in The Comics Journal, Stack contributed comics to such anthologies as Zero Zero, Blab!, Snarf, Rip Off Comix, and Weirdo. His strips The Case of Dr. Feelgood and Dorman's Doggie were syndicated by the Underground Press Syndicate in 1976–1978.

From 1986 to 2001, Stack was a regular contributor to Harvey Pekar's American Splendor. He also illustrated the acclaimed nonfiction graphic novel Our Cancer Year, written by Pekar and his wife Joyce Brabner, which won the 1995 Harvey Award for best original graphic novel.

== Personal life and death ==
Stack met his future wife Robbie Powell at the University of Texas, where they were both staffers on The Texas Ranger. Stack and Powell were married from 1959 until her death in 1998.

Stack died in Columbia, Missouri on April 12, 2026, at the age of 88.

== Exhibitions ==
- 2012–2013: State Historical Society of Missouri (University of Missouri, Columbia, Missouri) – "Frank Stack at 75"

== Comics and books ==
- The Adventures of Jesus (published in zine form by Gilbert Shelton, 1964)
- Jesus Comics (Rip Off Press, 1969–1972)
  - #1: The New Adventures of Jesus (1969)
  - #2: Jesus Meets the Armed Services (1970)
  - #3: Jesus Joins the Academic Community (1972)
- Feelgood Funnies (2 issues, Rip Off Press, 1972, 1984)
- Amazon Comics (Rip Off Press, 1972)
- Dorman's Doggie (Rip Off Press, 1979) ISBN 9780878160976
- Our Cancer Year (Four Walls Eight Windows, 1994) — written by Harvey Pekar and Joyce Brabner
- Naked Glory: the Erotic Art of Frank Stack (Eros Comix, 1998) ISBN 9781560972297
- The New Adventures of Jesus: The Second Coming (Fantagraphics, 2007) ISBN 9781560977803

== Filmography ==
- 2010 – A Horrible Way to Die – Elderly Man
- 2012 – V/H/S – Old Man (segment "Tape 56")
