= Overheard in Pittsburgh =

Overheard in Pittsburgh is a blog edited by Chris Griswold that publishes snippets of conversations overheard in Pittsburgh, Pennsylvania that are submitted by readers. Griswold created the site in September 2005, using the format originated by the Web site In Passing in 2000. According to The Pittsburgh Metropolitan, the site became "wildly popular" and published more than 100 entries within three months. Overheard in Pittsburgh has been written about in the Chicago Tribune, USA Today, and the Pittsburgh Post-Gazette.

In 2006, the Pittsburgh City Paper named Overheard in Pittsburgh the best Pittsburgh Web site, the result of the paper's annual reader poll. In discussing the site, the City Paper said Overheard in Pittsburgh represented the Pittsburghese word "nebby", which means "nosy," also a Pittsburgh tradition.

Griswold tries to differentiate "Overheard in Pittsburgh" from similar sites by striving to reflect life in Pittsburgh as best as he can, rather than, as City Paper reporter Justin Hopper wrote, "[…] simply repeat stupid things people say […] with a classist or even mildly racist take like many 'overheard' blogs do." Also distinguishing Overheard in Pittsburgh from most other sites in the genre is that it does not rely on an editorial team of contributors; instead, all entires come from Griswold or the people of Pittsburgh. According to Griswold, popular topics have included the Pittsburgh Steelers' win in Super Bowl XL and Mayor Bob O'Connor's death. Many of the site's submissions come from Oakland and the East End, the location of several of Pittsburgh's numerous colleges, and the rate of submissions slows when school is out for the summer.

== See also ==
- Overheard in New York
