= Michael Malice =

Ukrainian-American writer and media personality

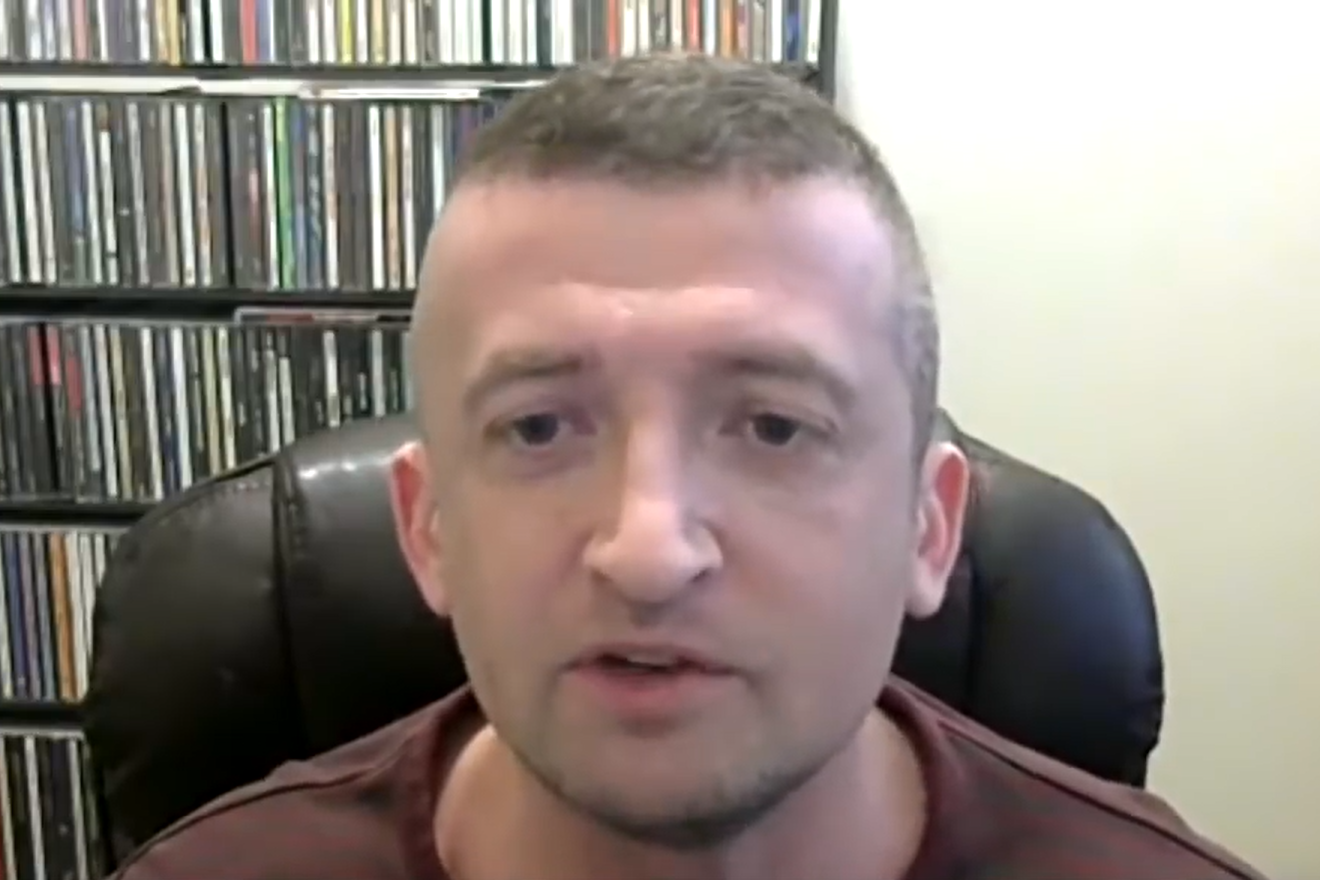
- Michael Malice in an interview with the Mises Institute
- Born: Michael Krechmer; July 12, 1976 (age 50); Lviv, Ukrainian SSR, Soviet Union
- Education: Bucknell University
- Occupations: Author, columnist, media personality
- Writing career
- Pen name: Michael Malice
- Language: English; Ukrainian; Russian
- Years active: 2006–present
- Genres: Politics; Culture

YouTube information
- Channel: Michael Malice
- Years active: 2013–present
- Genres: Politics; History; Comedy
- Subscribers: 240 thousand
- Views: 24.6 million
- Last updated: August 25, 2026
- Website: michaelmalice.com

Michael Krechmer (born July 12, 1976), known professionally as Michael Malice, is a Ukrainian-American author, and podcaster. He is the host of "YOUR WELCOME" with Michael Malice, a video podcast which airs on Podcast One.

== Early life and education ==
Malice was born in Lviv, a city in the former Ukrainian Soviet Socialist Republic. Malice has a sister and two nephews. He is of Jewish heritage and grew up speaking Russian.

When he was two years old, he moved with his parents to the Bensonhurst neighborhood of Brooklyn, New York City. His father originally worked as a courier and attended Baruch College to study computer science. He later worked for Merrill Lynch. Malice attended Bucknell University. Malice also worked for Goldman Sachs before quitting.

== Career ==
=== Blog and talk shows ===
Malice is the co-creator and founding editor of the humor blog Overheard in New York that posts submissions of conversations allegedly heard by eavesdroppers in New York City. Launched in 2003, the site was inspired by a conversation overheard by co-creator S. Morgan Friedman. A book based on some of the site's submissions was published in 2006. In 2017, Malice joined Compound Media as the host of the weekly talk show "YOUR WELCOME" with Michael Malice, whose title Malice has described as trolling. The Guardian described him as "a fixture of the alternative media sphere" in a 2018 article about a right-wing gala in New York City called "A Night for Freedom" where he was a speaker.

=== Writings ===
Malice has co-authored and ghostwritten books for celebrities. He co-wrote MMA fighter Matt Hughes's 2008 autobiography Made in America: The Most Dominant Champion in UFC History. He co-wrote Concierge Confidential: The Gloves Come Off – and the Secrets Come Out! Tales from the Man Who Serves Millionaires, Moguls, and Madmen (2011) with Michael Fazio, a concierge to New York City's rich and famous, Malice also co-wrote comedian D. L. Hughley's 2012 book I Want You to Shut the F#ck Up: How the Audacity of Dopes Is Ruining America and his 2016 book Black Man, White House: An Oral History of the Obama Years.

His own 2014 book Dear Reader: The Unauthorized Autobiography of Kim Jong Il was crowdfunded through Kickstarter and published through Amazon's CreateSpace program. It is written from the hypothetical first-person view of Kim and is a semi-farcical commentary on how he is portrayed to the North Korean people. Much of it was based on English language propaganda that Malice collected while on a week-long trip to Pyongyang, North Korea in 2012. He had previously recounted the trip in a 2013 article for Reason. In a generally positive review for NK News, Rob York described Dear Reader as "informative, and surprisingly earnest."

Malice's 2019 book The New Right: A Journey to the Fringe of American Politics says that the American New Right movement should not be equated to Nazis and that some members are acting out in response to progressivism. Kirkus Reviews doubted some of his reasoning, noting that many of his interviewees "are disturbingly assured that Hitler, if not Jefferson Davis, had it right". In 2021, Malice published The Anarchist Handbook, a collection of essays and writing from various anarchists throughout history, including Emma Goldman, Mikhail Bakunin, Max Stirner, Murray Rothbard, as well as an essay on anarchism by Malice himself. In 2023, Malice published The White Pill, a history of the rise and fall of the Soviet Union.

=== Other appearances ===
Since 2014, Malice has been a regular guest on the Fox News and Fox Business Network shows The Independents, Kennedy, Red Eye, The Greg Gutfeld Show, The Story with Martha MacCallum, and Tucker Carlson Tonight. He is also a regular guest on The Tom Woods Show podcast and has appeared on The Joe Rogan Experience and The Rubin Report. Malice is also a regular columnist at Observer.

=== Reception ===
Malice's early life was the subject of Harvey Pekar's 2006 biographical graphic novel Ego & Hubris: The Michael Malice Story, illustrated by Gary Dumm. As the title suggests, the biography deals with the development of Malice's egoic personality, a characteristic that Malice does not dispute.

== Views ==
Malice describes himself as an anarchist or anarchist without adjectives. Reason described his politics as a combination of anarchism, objectivism, and libertarianism in 2006. In 2014, he wrote an opinion piece for The Guardian explaining why he does not vote. Malice has advocated for the peaceful dissolution of the United States.

Malice is known for trolling others on social media, according to The American Conservative. He has said his pseudonymous surname was inspired primarily by British punk singer Lora Logic, and by nicknames such as Sid Vicious and Poly Styrene that were common within the punk movement and Andy Warhol's circle, which he has cited as influences.

== Personal life ==
Malice, formerly of New York City, resides in Austin, Texas.

== Bibliography ==
As sole author:

- Dear Reader : the Unauthorized Autobiography of Kim Jong Il. North Charleston, South Carolina: Self-published (via CreateSpace). 2014. ISBN 9781495283253.
- The New Right : a Journey to the Fringe of American Politics. New York, N.Y.: St. Martin's Press. 2019. ISBN 9781250154668.
- The White Pill: A Tale of Good and Evil. New York, N.Y.: Self-published. 2022. ISBN 9798366737548.

As editor:

- The Anarchist Handbook. New York, N.Y.: Self-published. 2021. ISBN 9798748719629.

As co-author:

- Pekar, Harvey; Malice, Michael; Dumm, Gary (2006). Ego & Hubris : the Michael Malice story. New York: Ballantine Books. ISBN 9780345479396.
- Friedman, S. Morgan; Malice, Michael (2006). Overheard in New York : conversations from the streets, stores, and subways. New York: Roadside Amusements. ISBN 9780399534089.
- Friedman, S. Morgan; Malice, Michael (2008). Overheard in the office : conversations from water coolers, conference rooms, and cubicles. New York: Penguin. ISBN 9780399533914.
- Hughes, Matt; Malice, Michael (2008). Made in America : the most dominant champion in UFC history. New York: Simon Spotlight Entertainment. ISBN 9781416948834.
- Fazio, Michael; Malice, Michael (2011). Concierge confidential. New York: St. Martin's Press. ISBN 9781250002730.
- Hughley, D. L.; Malice, Michael (2012). I want you to shut the f#ck up : how the audacity of dopes is ruining America. New York: Crown Archetype. ISBN 9780307986269.
- Durant, John; Malice, Michael (2013). The paleo manifesto : ancient wisdom for lifelong health (First ed.). New York: Harmony Books. ISBN 9780307889171.
- Hughley, D. L.; Malice, Michael (2016). Black man, White House : an oral history of the Obama years. New York, NY: William Morrow. ISBN 9780062399809.

== See also ==
- Lex Fridman
- Konstantin Kisin
- Dave Rubin
