= Greg Budgett =

American comics artist

- Born: c. 1952 (age 73–74)
- Areas: Writer, Penciller, Inker
- Notable works: American Splendor
- Collaborators: Harvey Pekar, Gary Dumm

Greg Budgett (b. c. 1952) is a Cleveland, Ohio-based comic book artist known particularly for his work illustrating the comics of Harvey Pekar. Most of Budgett's work on Pekar's American Splendor and other comics has been in partnership with Gary Dumm, who has inked most of Budgett's stories.

Budgett attended Ohio University, graduating with a Bachelor of Fine Arts. Pekar and Budgett began working together in 1974; before American Splendor, Budgett illustrated a couple of short Pekar stories (one of them in partnership with Dumm) in the underground comix anthologies Bizarre Sex and Flaming Baloney X.

From 1976 until 1988, Budgett illustrated stories in Pekar's autobiographical comics series, American Splendor. Budgett was one of Pekar's most frequent early collaborators; most of his stories were inked by Dumm. Budgett drew a number of American Splendor covers as well, including issues #2, 3, 7, 8, 11, and 13.

During the 1980s, Budgett and Dumm worked on stories in Dr. Wirtham's Comix & Stories, an underground/alternative comics series published by Clifford Neal, as well as a number of other alternative and independent comic book series. In the early 1990s, Budgett and Dumm co-wrote and drew stories for Eternity Comics' Plan 9 from Outer Space: Thirty Years Later and their own erotic series Shooty Beagle and Woofers & Hooters (both with Eros Comix).

By the early 1990s, Budgett had "de-emphasized cartooning" and didn't work in the industry again until 2004, when (at the urging of Gary Dumm) he illustrated another Pekar story in the 2004 collection American Splendor: Our Movie Year. He was a regular contributor to Vertigo's two American Splendor limited series in 2006–2008.

== Bibliography ==
=== American Splendor ===
all stories by Harvey Pekar

- American Splendor #1 (Harvey Pekar, 1976):
  - "101 Ways to Pick Up Girls"
  - "How I Spent My Summer Vacation: 1972"
  - "The Rank"
  - (inks) "Love Story" (pencils by Gary Dumm)
  - "A Mexican Tale" (inks by Munan) (originally published in Flaming Baloney X)
  - "You fuckers can leave if you wanna..."
- American Splendor #2 (Harvey Pekar, 1977):
  - Front and back covers
  - "Guerilla Theatre: July ’74 — on the Corne"
  - "On the Corner… A Sequel, June, 1976"
  - "Vignettes #1 & #2"
- American Splendor #3 (Harvey Pekar, 1978):
  - Front cover
  - "Awaking to the Terror of the New Day"
  - "Awaking to the Terror of the Same Old Day"
  - "Short Weekend: A Story About the Cosmic and the Ordinary"
  - "Traditional Male Chauvinism"
  - "Vignettes 3 thru 6"
- American Splendor #5 (Harvey Pekar, 1980):
  - "Coventry Night, Summer, 1976"
  - "Scenes from Star Books"
  - (inks) "Emil" (pencils by Gary Dumm)
  - (inks) "Mrs. Roosevelt and the Young Queen of Greece" (pencils by Gary Dumm)
- American Splendor #6 (Harvey Pekar, 1981):
  - "Cyclical Theory [back cover]"
  - "Read This"
  - "Ripoff Chick"
- American Splendor #7 (Harvey Pekar, 1982):
  - Front cover
  - "The Day Before the Be-In"
- American Splendor #8 (Harvey Pekar, 1983):
  - Front cover
  - "In the Parking Lot"
- American Splendor #11 (Harvey Pekar, 1986):
  - Back cover
  - "Old Guys"
- "Ethnic Bakery — Sunday Morning [back cover]," American Splendor #12 (Harvey Pekar, 1987)
- Back cover, American Splendor #13 (Harvey Pekar, 1988)
- (insert art) "Passport to Pimlico," (story mostly penciled by Joe Zabel) American Splendor #14 (Harvey Pekar, 1989)
- "Fish Story," American Splendor: Our Movie Year (Ballantine Books, 2004)
- "Northwest Airlines Goes Socialist," American Splendor vol. 1, #1 (Vertigo, 2006)
- "Regionalism," American Splendor vol. 1, #3 (Vertigo, 2007)
- "Grocery Shopping," American Splendor vol. 1, #4 (Vertigo, 2007)
- (inks) "Town Meeting," (pencils by Gary Dumm) American Splendor vol. 2, #2 (Vertigo, 2008)
- (breakdowns) "Chapter Three: The Car," (finishes by Gary Dumm), American Splendor vol. 2, #4 (Vertigo, 2008)

=== Stories elsewhere ===
- "The Kinsman Cowboys: How'd Ya Get Inta This Bizness Ennyway?," story by Harvey Pekar, inks by Gary Dumm, in Bizarre Sex #4 (Kitchen Sink Press, Oct. 1975)
- "A Mexican Tale," story by Harvey Pekar, inks by Munan, Flaming Baloney X (Propaganda, Inc., c. 1975)
- "The Puzzle," co-written, penciled and inked with Gary Dumm, Dr. Wirtham's Comix & Stories #5/6 (Clifford Neal, Winter 1980)
- "Cheese for Cakes Sake" (back cover), co-written, penciled and inked with Gary Dumm, Dr. Wirtham's Comix & Stories #7/8 (Clifford Neal, 1982)
- "Shooty Beagle Goes to the Mall," co-written, penciled and inked with Gary Dumm, Dr. Wirtham's Comix & Stories #7/8 (Clifford Neal, 1982)
- "The Compleat Videots" (starring Shooty Beagle), co-written, penciled and inked with Gary Dumm, Dr. Wirtham's Comix & Stories #9/10 (Clifford Neal, Winter 1987)
- "The Twilight Avenger Gallery," Twilight Avenger #3 (Eternity Comics, 1988)
- Plan 9 from Outer Space: Thirty Years Later #1–3 (Eternity Comics, Jan.–Mar. 1991)
- Shooty Beagle #1-3, with Joe Zabel and Gary Dumm (Eros Comix, Apr.–June 1991)
- Woofers & Hooters (with Gary Dumm) (Eros Comix, Feb. 1992)
