= Gary Dumm =

American comic book artist

- Born: December 7, 1947 (age 78)
- Areas: Writer, Penciller, Inker
- Notable works: American Splendor
- Collaborators: Harvey Pekar; Greg Budgett; Joe Zabel

Gary G. Dumm (b. c. 1947) is an American comic book artist known particularly for his work illustrating the comics of Harvey Pekar.

From 1976 until Pekar's 2010 death, he worked on Pekar's autobiographical comic series, American Splendor, much of the time as an inker, embellishing the pencils of Greg Budgett and Joe Zabel, although he also illustrated some stories on his own. (Dumm has also inked Zabel in other venues, including Caliber's Dancing With Your Eyes Closed, Fantagraphics' Real Stuff, and Zabel's own title The Trespassers.)

Dumm was one of Pekar's most frequent and longest-running collaborators on American Splendor; his no-frills style fit the tone of Pekar's tales of quotidian life. Although Dumm's work was characterized by one reviewer as "ham-fisted," whose characters all look "45" years old, Pekar "had great appreciation for Gary as an artist and as a person. . . . He's also good to work with — he's always on time, and can meet practically any kind of deadline. He's especially good at working large blocks of text into his work without making it seem text-heavy."

Dumm also collaborated with Pekar as the primary artist on two full-length books, Ego & Hubris: The Michael Malice Story, and Students for a Democratic Society: A Graphic History.

During the 1980s, Budgett and Dumm worked on stories in Dr. Wirtham's Comix & Stories, an underground/alternative comics series published by Clifford Neal, as well as a number of other alternative and independent comic book series. In the early 1990s, Budgett and Dumm co-wrote and drew stories for Eternity Comics' Plan 9 From Outer Space: Thirty Years Later and their own erotic series Shooty Beagle and Woofers & Hooters (both with Eros Comix).

Dumm has also worked on such projects as Dennis McGee and The Miracle Squad. He contributes a regular strip (illustrated bios of blues people) to the newsletter Music Makers Rag. His editorial cartoons have been published in Cleveland Scene, Cleveland Free Times, and The Plain Dealer. A retrospective of his work was shown at the Artists Archives of the Western Reserve in Cleveland.

in May 2020, Fire on the Water was published by Abrams ComicArts, an imprint of Abrams Books, illustrated by Dumm and written by his long-time friend and fellow Cleveland-resident, Scott McGregor. The book is inspired by a true-life tragedy in 1916, dealing with tunneling beneath Lake Erie.

Dumm says he feels "itchy" when he is not drawing.

== Personal life ==
Dumm married wife Laura, who is also an artist, in 1971. They live on the west side of Cleveland with a "family" of eight rescued stray cats. From c. 1971–1983, Dumm worked as the assistant manager of the Cleveland-based Kay's Bookstore.

== Bibliography ==
As primary artist:

- Ego & Hubris: The Michael Malice Story (written by Harvey Pekar) (Ballantine Books, 2006) ISBN 0-345-47939-4
- Students for a Democratic Society: A Graphic History (written by Harvey Pekar and Paul Buhle) (Hill and Wang, 2008) ISBN 0-8090-9539-4
- Contributed a bio-comic on Hugh Hefner to Masterful Marks, Cartoonists Who Changed the World (written by Monte Beauchamp) (Simon & Schuster, 2014) ISBN 978-1451649192
