= Joe Zabel =

American webcomic author (born 1953)

- Born: Joseph Zabel; 1953 (age 72–73) Ohio, U.S.
- Areas: Cartoonist, Writer, Penciller
- Notable works: American Splendor; Trespassers; Fear Mongers

Joe Zabel (born July 7, 1953) is a comic book writer and artist living in Cleveland Heights. He is best known for his work illustrating American Splendor, by fellow Clevelander Harvey Pekar. Under the company names Known Associates Press and Amazing Montage Press, Zabel has also published his own series of mystery comics, The Trespassers.

Zabel grew up in Chesterland, Ohio, and attended Youngstown State University. He broke into comics in 1977, helping to draw a promo ad in an issue of Power Comics' Cobalt Blue. Shortly after moving to Cleveland, he began illustrating for American Splendor in 1985, usually inked by Gary Dumm, and was a regular contributor to Pekar's comics until 1997, illustrating many covers along the way. Zabel also had his work published in anthologies like Duplex Planet Illustrated, Negative Burn, and Real Stuff.

Beginning in the 2000s, Zabel turned away from printed comics and begun making online digital comic strips. Zabel's Fear Mongers horror webcomics was used, along with Penny Arcade, Fetus-X and American Elf, as an example of using the web to create "an explosion of diverse genres and styles" in Scott McCloud's 2006 book Making Comics.

Zabel is also a comics reviewer, having been published in such venues as The Comics Journal, Subliminal Tattoos, Indy magazine, and iComics.com. He was the editor-in-chief of The Webcomics Examiner, an online magazine of webcomics reviews and interviews.
