= Overheard in New York =

Humor blog published by Michael Malice

Overheard in New York is a humor blog, published by Michael Malice and S. Morgan Friedman, that documents snippets of conversation heard by passersby in New York City. The blog popularized the format, which was created by the Web site In Passing in 2000. Overheard in New York was originally edited by Michael Malice, later Jenny Weiss, and finally Kristina Ryan. Its current editors are Dave Barnette, Danielle Lindemann, Guillermo Rubens, and Murphy Scott.

== History ==
Overheard in New York was originally edited by Michael Malice, later Jenny Weiss, and finally Kristina Ryan. In April 2006, Friedman fired original editor Malice after a dispute concerning editorial control. Malice immediately created New York, Overheard, a nearly identical site with the same format and layout. The two settled their dispute in May 2006, announcing a return to "regularly scheduled eavesdropping". At that time, Malice removed his competing site, and Friedman credited Malice on the original site as "Founding Editor".

A book titled Overheard in New York by the blog founders was published in 2008.

== Content and derivative sites ==
The source of the humor in each quote varies. Some are intentional witticisms on the part of their speaker, some are based on his or her apparent cluelessness (as with tourists or children), lack of common sense, or stupidity (as with Gothamites), and some seem to demonstrate symptoms of mental illness. Because submitters usually do not know the people they are quoting, they often use glib labels such as "suit on phone", "tourist", "hobo", or "drunk NYU chick". Overheard in New York has become well known within the city, and a few of the quoted conversations mention their being likely to turn up on the Web site.

Overheard in New York has expanded with a variety of "sister" Web sites, including Overheard in the Office, Overheard at the Beach, Overheard Everywhere, and Celebrity Wit.

Similar websites exist for comments overheard in a variety of places. In Passing began publishing overheard dialogue from Berkeley, California in 2000, and more recent sites feature conversations from Philadelphia, Pittsburgh, Montreal, Paris, Dublin, the London Underground, Minneapolis, Yale University and Vancouver, B.C. In an interview with Gothamist, Malice spoke negatively of other overheard sites, calling the ones that do not link to Overheard in New York and "act like the idea came from nowhere" as "ripoffs" and going so far as to say that he hopes for the children of the sites' creators to die for no discernible reason. There is a substantial history of posting "overheard" dialogue online for amusement. A Google search for "Overheard on IRC" displays many items. Furthermore, author Susan Catherine published a series of books featuring eavesdropped dialogue that dates back to 1984.

Nigel Rees published a collection of overheard remarks in the book Eavesdroppings in 1981.

Artist Judith Henry published an Overheard book series, and created a window installation, Overheard in New York for Bergdorf Goodman, later followed by a Los Angeles window installation, Overheard Los Angeles for Neiman Marcus.

== See also ==
- Overheard in Pittsburgh
