= 2003 Los Angeles Film Critics Association Awards =

Annual US film awards ceremony

29th LAFCA Awards
- Date: January 7, 2004

Highlights
- Best Picture: American Splendor

The 29th Los Angeles Film Critics Association Awards, given by the Los Angeles Film Critics Association (LAFCA) on January 7, 2004, honored the best in film for 2003. The ceremony was originally called off because of the MPAA screener ban as members felt they could not see all the movies in time for their awards but when that was removed the show was back on.

== Winners ==
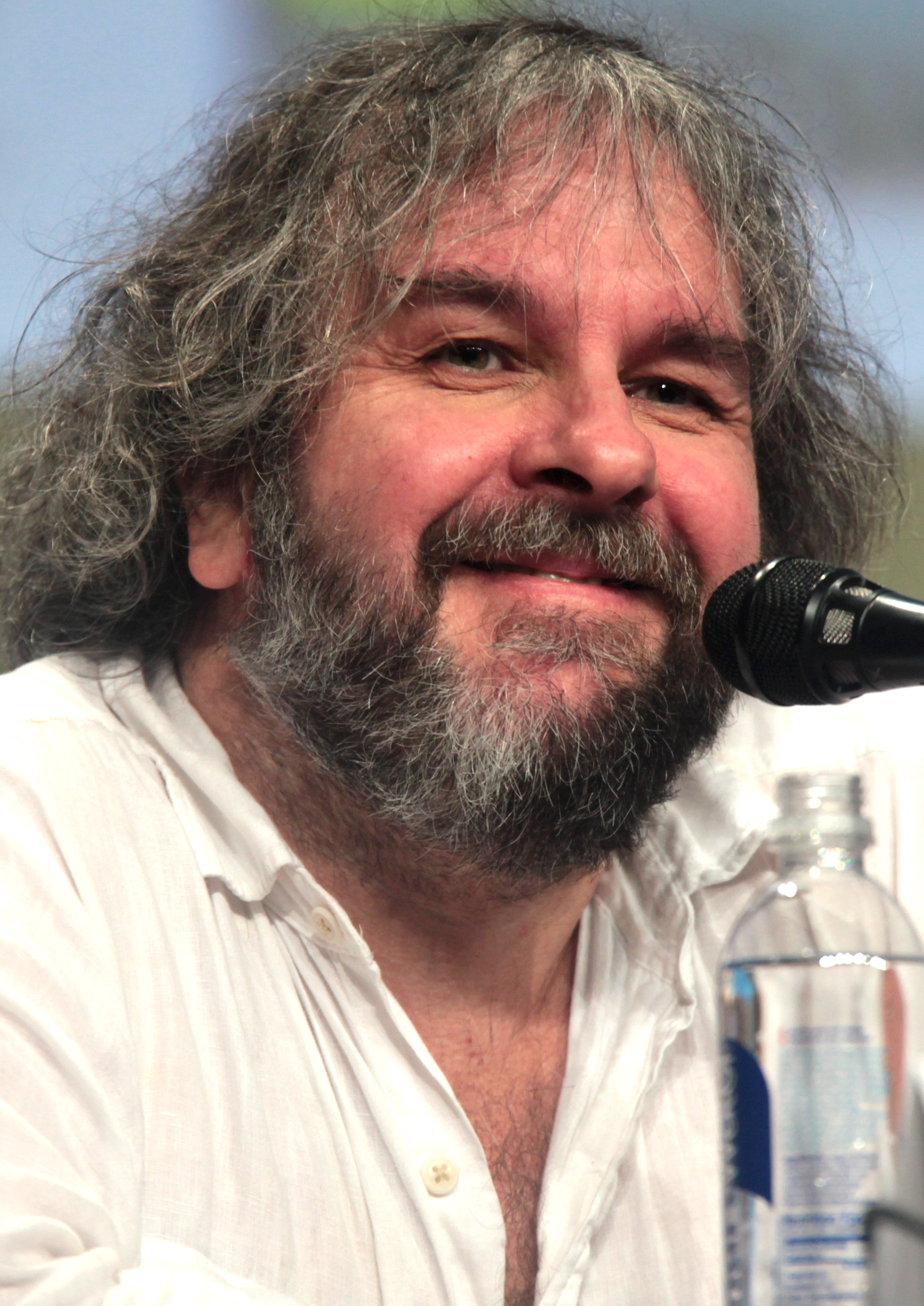
Peter Jackson, Best Director winner

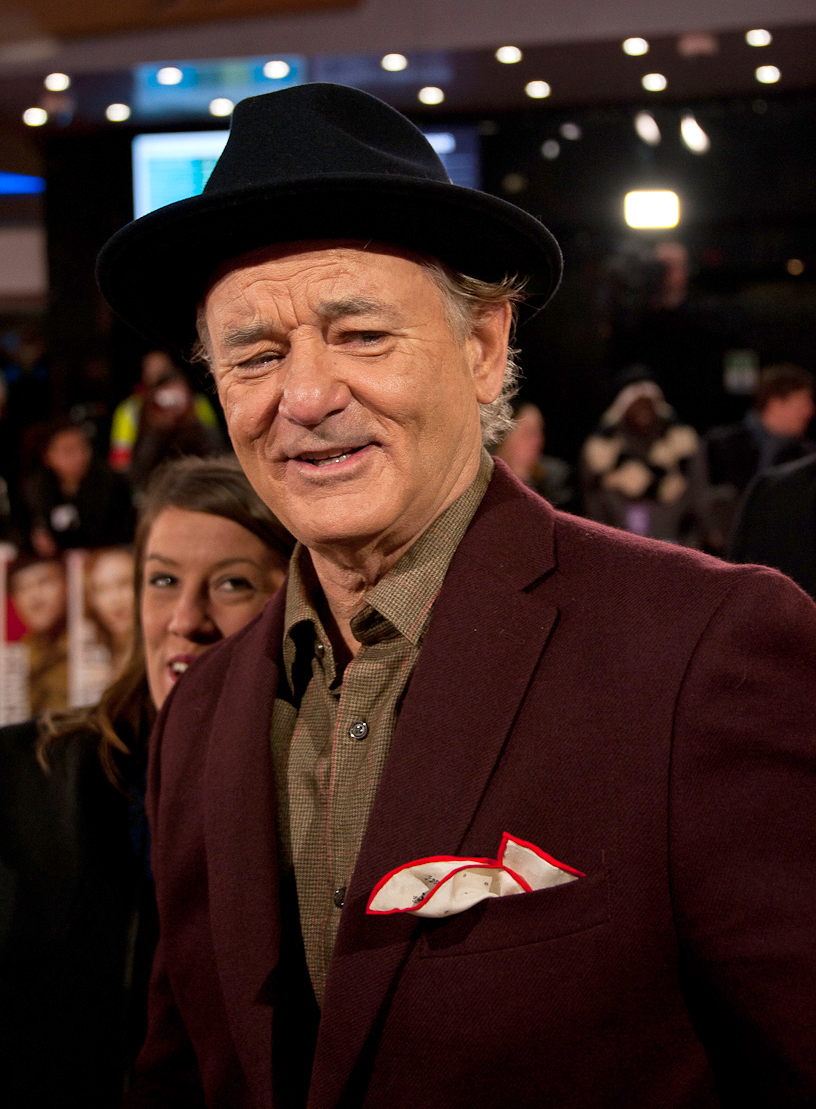
Bill Murray, Best Actor winner

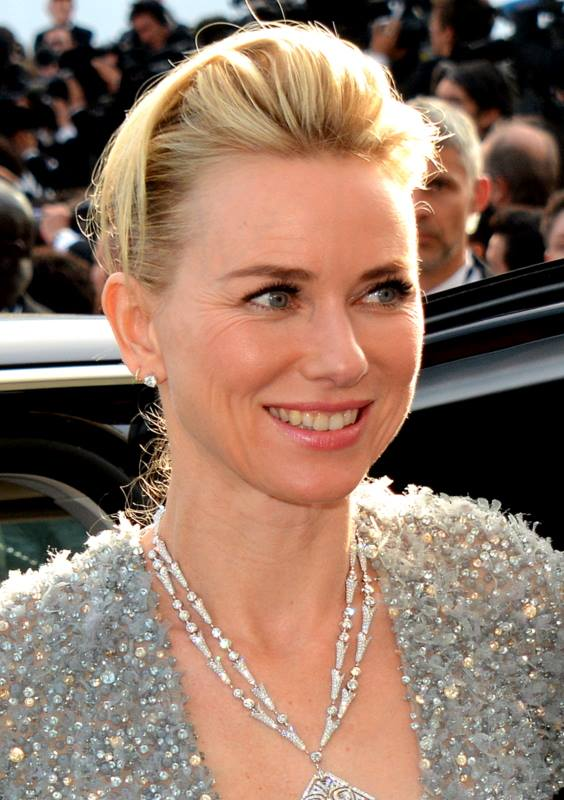
Naomi Watts, Best Actress winner

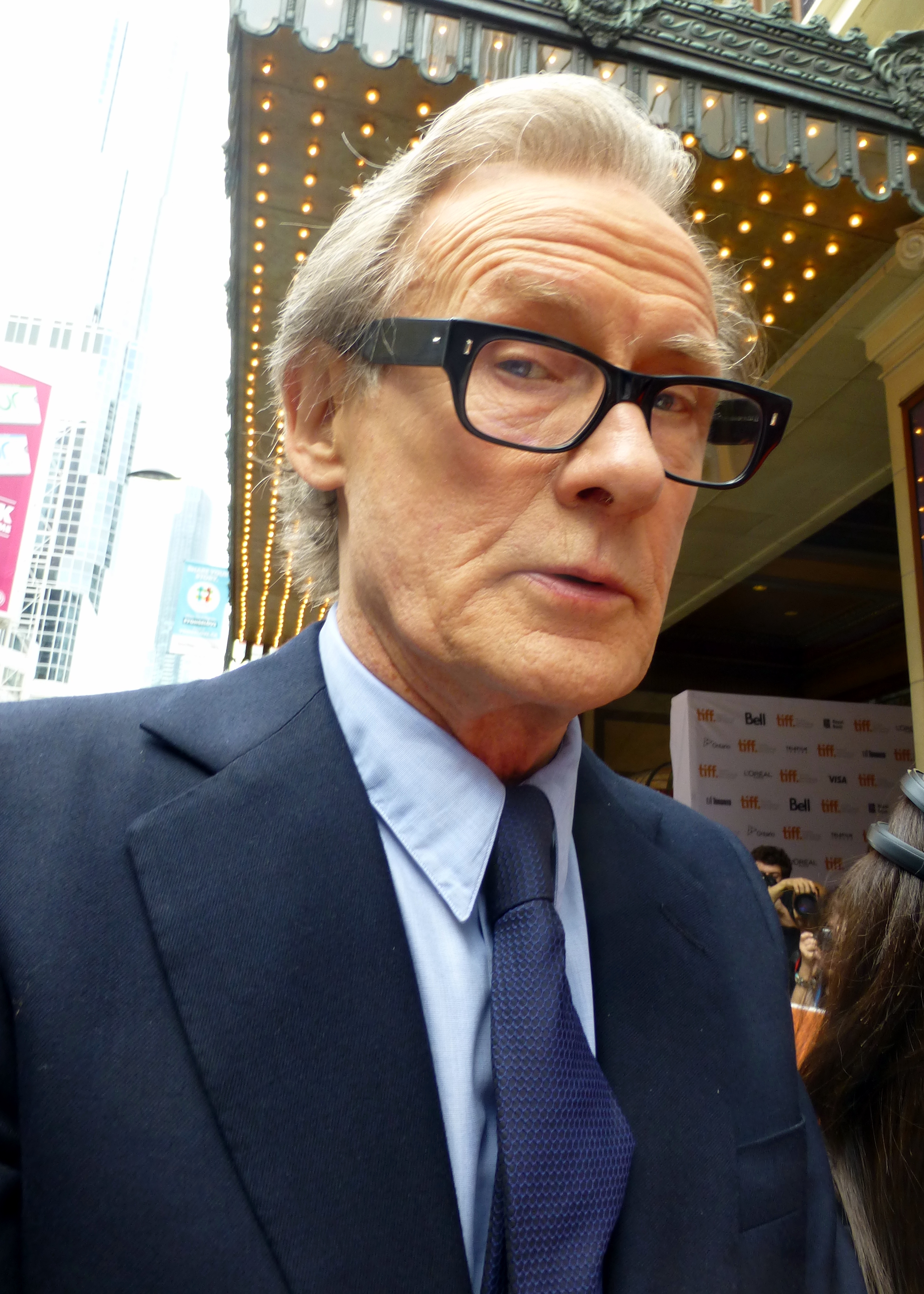
Bill Nighy, Best Supporting Actor winner

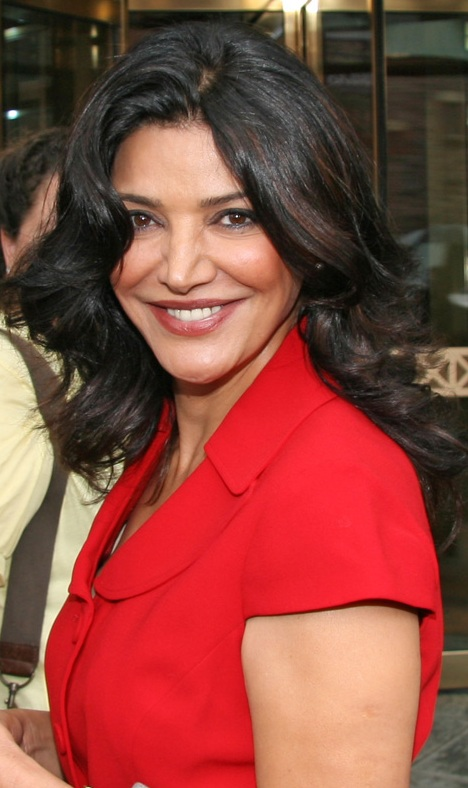
Shohreh Aghdashloo, Best Supporting Actress winner

- Best Picture:
  - American Splendor
  - Runner-up: Lost in Translation
- Best Director:
  - Peter Jackson – The Lord of the Rings: The Return of the King
  - Runner-up: Clint Eastwood – Mystic River
- Best Actor:
  - Bill Murray – Lost in Translation
  - Runner-up: Sean Penn – 21 Grams and Mystic River
- Best Actress:
  - Naomi Watts – 21 Grams
  - Runner-up: Charlize Theron – Monster
- Best Supporting Actor:
  - Bill Nighy – AKA, I Capture the Castle, Lawless Heart, and Love Actually
  - Runner-up: Benicio del Toro – 21 Grams
- Best Supporting Actress:
  - Shohreh Aghdashloo – House of Sand and Fog
  - Runner-up: Melissa Leo – 21 Grams
- Best Screenplay:
  - Shari Springer Berman and Robert Pulcini – American Splendor
  - Runner-up: Steven Knight – Dirty Pretty Things
- Best Cinematography:
  - Eduardo Serra – Girl with a Pearl Earring
  - Runner-up: Harris Savides – Elephant
- Best Production Design:
  - Grant Major – The Lord of the Rings: The Return of the King
  - Runner-up: William Sandell – Master and Commander: The Far Side of the World
- Best Music Score:
  - Benoît Charest and Matthieu Chedid – The Triplets of Belleville (Les triplettes de Belleville)
  - Runner-up: Christopher Guest, John Michael Higgins, Eugene Levy, Michael McKean, Catherine O'Hara, Annette O'Toole, Harry Shearer, and C. J. Vanston – A Mighty Wind
- Best Foreign-Language Film:
  - The Man on the Train (L'homme du train) • France
  - Runner-up: City of God (Cidade de Deus) • Brazil/France
- Best Documentary/Non-Fiction Film:
  - The Fog of War
  - Runner-up: Capturing the Friedmans
- Best Animation:
  - The Triplets of Belleville (Les triplettes de Belleville)
- The Douglas Edwards Experimental/Independent Film/Video Award:
  - Thom Andersen – Los Angeles Plays Itself
  - Pat O'Neill – The Decay of Fiction
- New Generation Award:
  - Scarlett Johansson
- Career Achievement Award:
  - Robert Altman
- Special Citation:
  - Disney restoration of the Walt Disney/Salvador Dalí short Destino
