= 2003 National Society of Film Critics Awards =

Annual US film awards ceremony

38th NSFC Awards

January 3, 2004

Best Film:
American Splendor

The 38th National Society of Film Critics Awards, given on 3 January 2004, honored the best in film for 2003.

== Winners ==
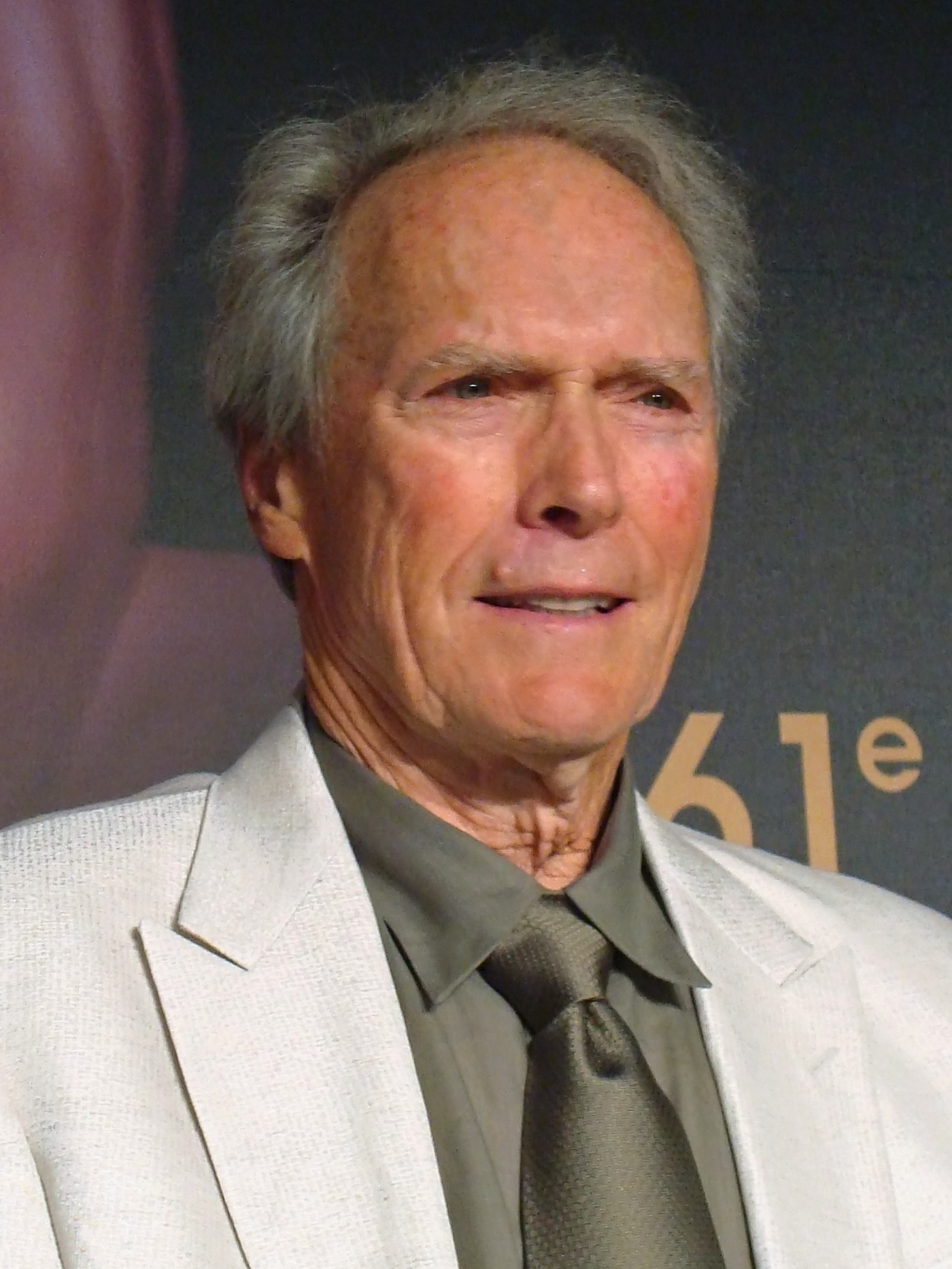
Clint Eastwood, Best Director winner

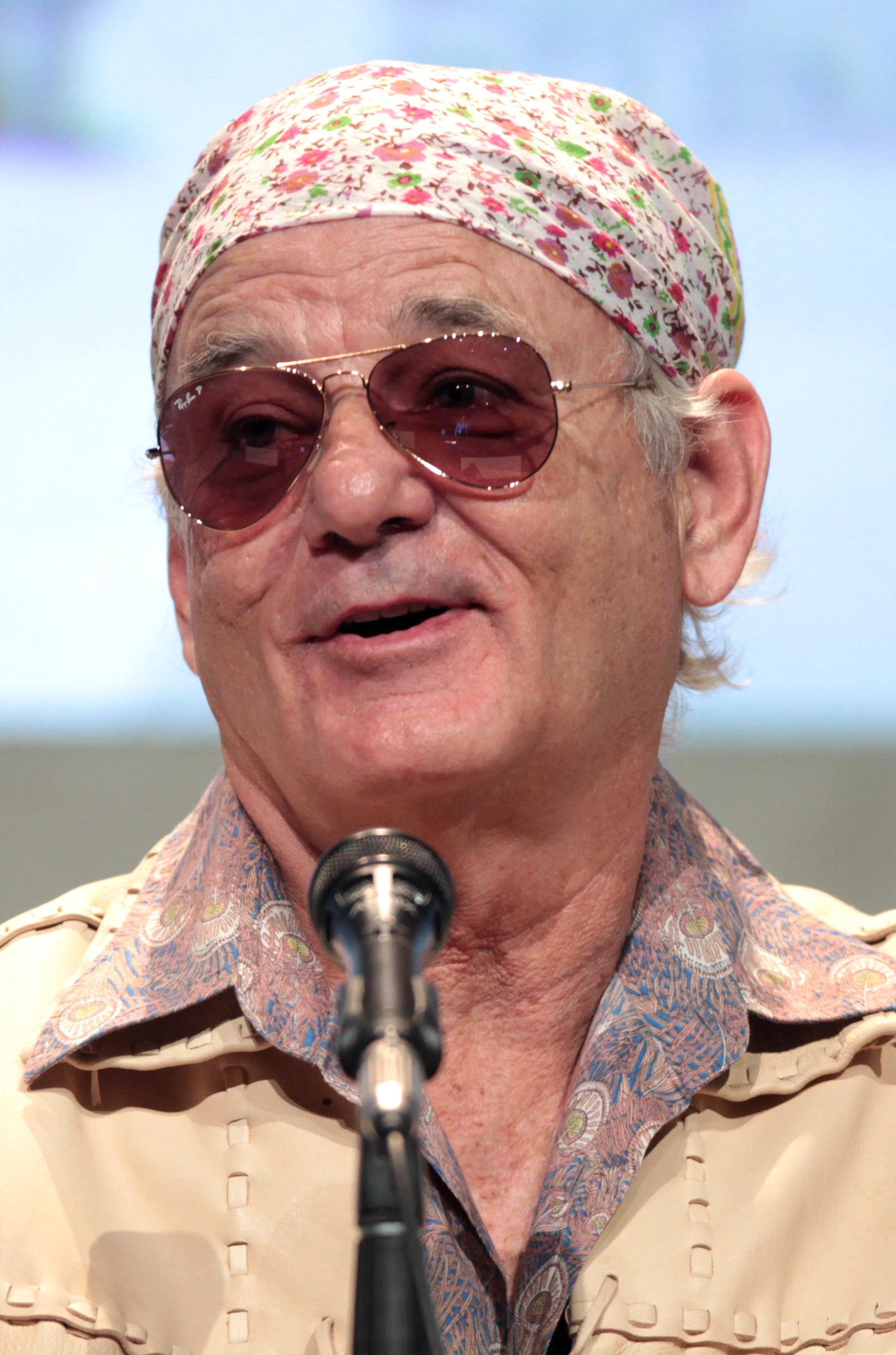
Bill Murray, Best Actor winner

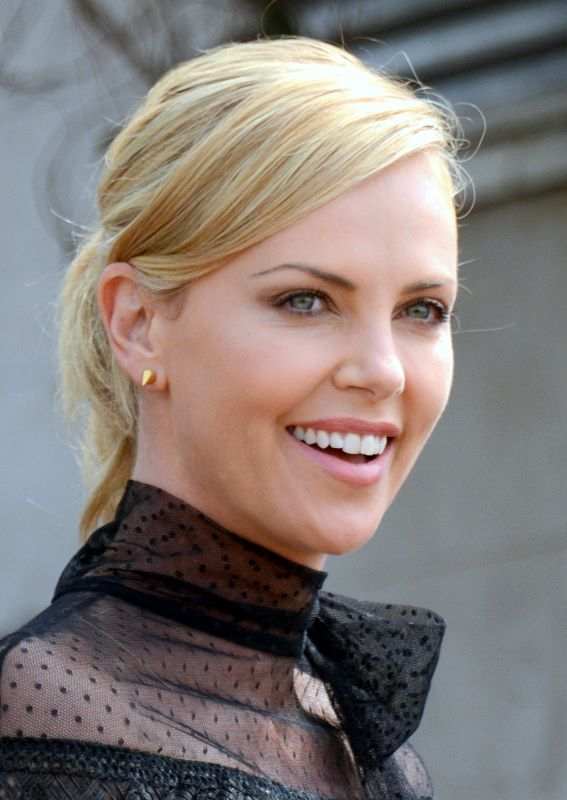
Charlize Theron, Best Actress winner

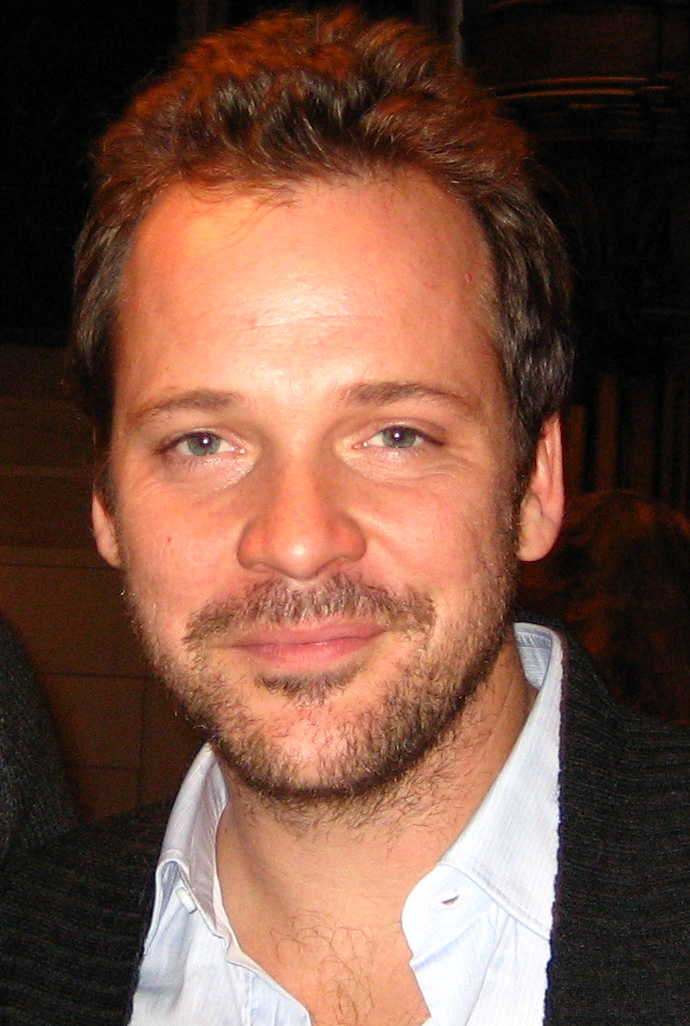
Peter Sarsgaard, Best Supporting Actor winner

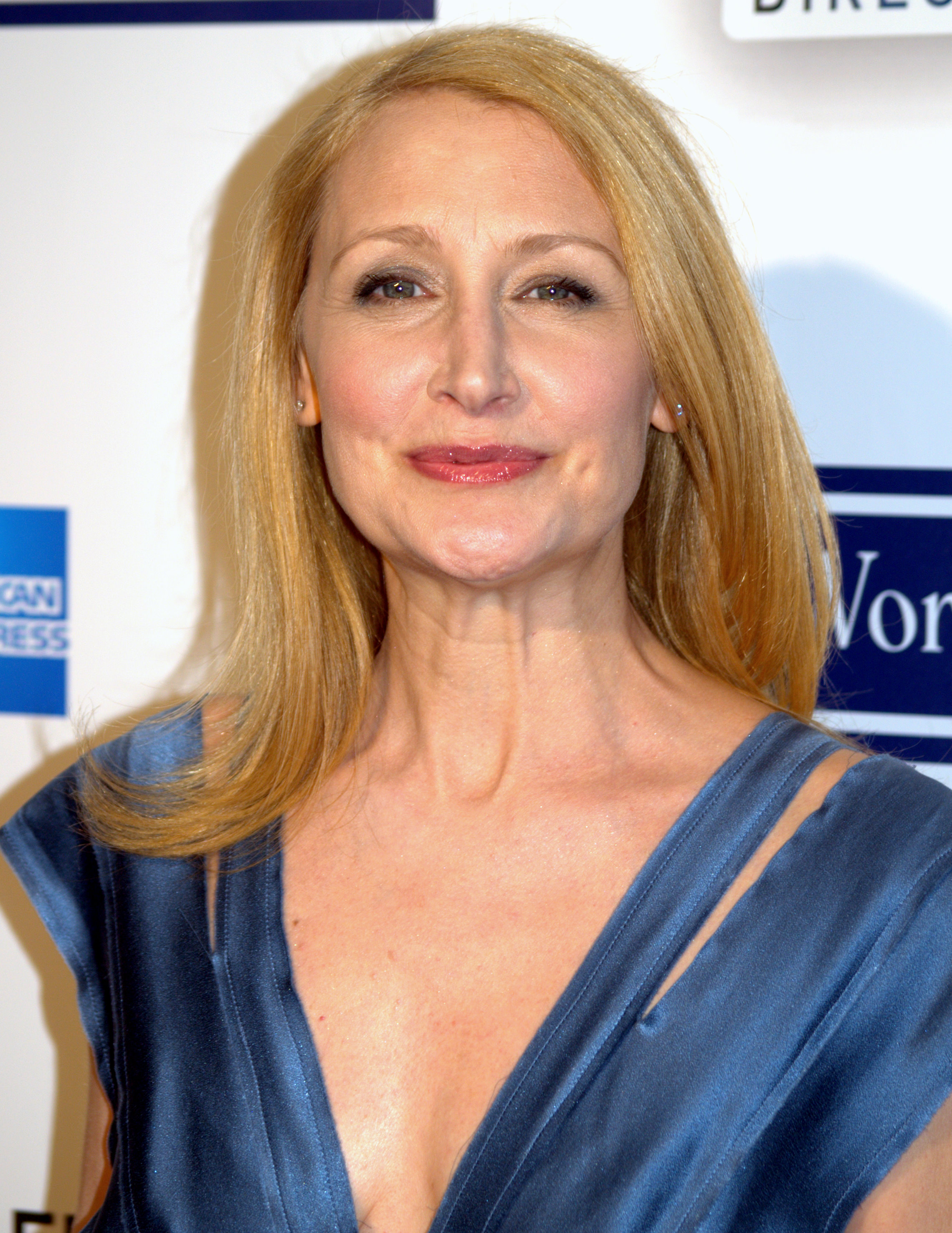
Patricia Clarkson, Best Supporting Actress winner

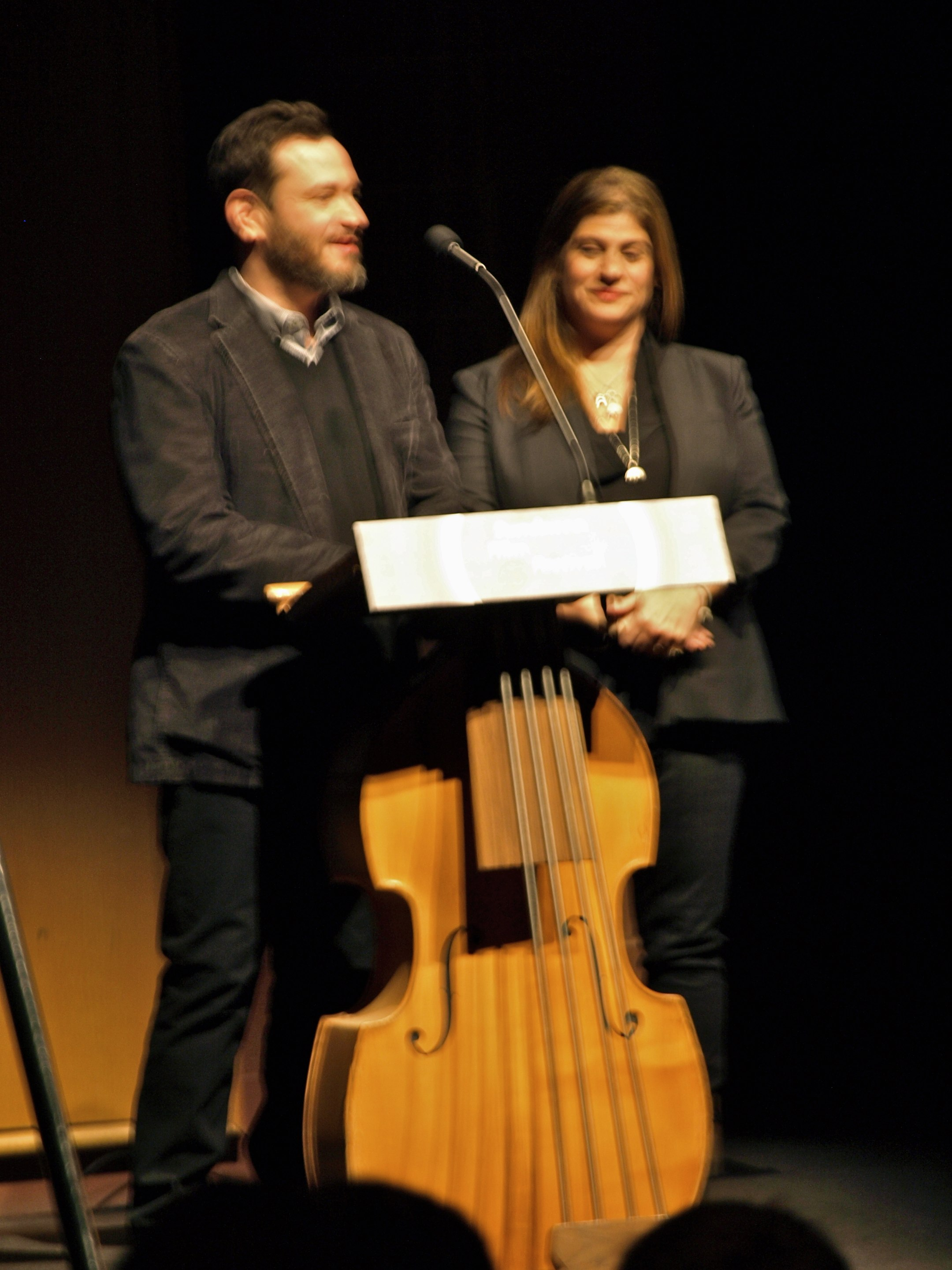
Shari Springer Berman and Robert Pulcini, Best Screenplay winners

=== Best Picture ===
1. American Splendor
2. Mystic River
3. Lost in Translation

=== Best Director ===
1. Clint Eastwood – Mystic River
2. Peter Jackson – The Lord of the Rings: The Return of the King
3. Sofia Coppola – Lost in Translation

=== Best Actor ===
1. Bill Murray – Lost in Translation
2. Sean Penn – Mystic River
3. Paul Giamatti – American Splendor

=== Best Actress ===
1. Charlize Theron – Monster
2. Hope Davis – American Splendor and The Secret Lives of Dentists
3. Naomi Watts – 21 Grams

=== Best Supporting Actor ===
1. Peter Sarsgaard – Shattered Glass
2. Tim Robbins – Mystic River
3. Alec Baldwin – The Cooler

=== Best Supporting Actress ===
1. Patricia Clarkson – Pieces of April and The Station Agent
2. Maria Bello – The Cooler
3. Shohreh Aghdashloo – House of Sand and Fog

=== Best Screenplay ===
1. Shari Springer Berman and Robert Pulcini – American Splendor
2. Brian Helgeland – Mystic River
3. Craig Lucas – The Secret Lives of Dentists

=== Best Cinematography ===
1. Russell Boyd – Master and Commander: The Far Side of the World
2. Lance Acord – Lost in Translation
3. Harris Savides – Elephant

=== Best Foreign Language Film ===
1. The Man Without a Past (Mies vailla menneisyyttä)
2. The Triplets of Belleville (Les triplettes de Belleville)
3. Unknown Pleasures (Rèn xiāo yáo)

=== Best Non-Fiction Film ===
1. To Be and to Have (Être et avoir)
2. The Fog of War
3. Spellbound

=== Film Heritage Awards ===
1. Kino on Video for its excellent DVD collections of F. W. Murnau, Erich von Stroheim, and the American Film Theatre Series
2. Milestone Film & Video for its exemplary theatrical and/or DVD presentations of Michael Powell's The Edge of the World, Rupert Julian's The Phantom of the Opera, E. A. Dupont's Piccadilly, André Antoine's La Terre, and Mad Love, the films of Yevgeni Bauer.
