= Was It Something I Said? =

Was It Something I Said? may refer to:

- Was It Something I Said? (album), by Eytan Mirsky, 2001
- Was It Something I Said? (panel show), a 2013 British gameshow
- "Was It Something I Said", a song by Orchestral Manoeuvres in the Dark from the album Sugar Tax, 1991
- "Was It Something I Said?", a song by Brandon Flowers from the album Flamingo, 2010
