= Water and Power =

1989 experimental documentary film

- Directed by: Pat O'Neill
- Release date: October 1, 1989 (New York)
- Running time: 57 minutes
- Country: United States
- Language: English

Water and Power is a 1989 experimental documentary film by Pat O'Neill.

== Summary ==
A reflection between nature and man in Los Angeles about the city's surroundings' desertification due to enormous water consumption.

== Reception ==
It won the Documentary Grand Jury Prize at the 1990 Sundance Film Festival. In 2008, It was selected for preservation in the United States National Film Registry by the Library of Congress, being deemed "culturally, historically, or aesthetically significant". Water and Power was also preserved by the Academy Film Archive in 2009 in conjunction with Pat O'Neill.

== See also ==
- 1989 in film
- The Decay of Fiction -a 2002 film also by O'Neill
- Art film
