= Eytan Mirsky =

American singer-songwriter (born 1961)

Eytan Mirsky (born December 18, 1961) is a New York City-based American singer-songwriter.

== Career ==
He is known mainly for his original contributions to film soundtracks, including the title songs for the critically acclaimed films Happiness (sung by R.E.M.'s Michael Stipe) and American Splendor (in which he himself appeared singing the theme). He also contributed three songs to the film The Tao of Steve, including the title song and “(I Just Wanna Be) Your Steve McQueen.” He also contributed music to the films Palindromes, The Company and Desert Blue.

Mirsky’s 1996 debut album, Songs About Girls (& Other Painful Subjects), garnered praise from critics, as did six subsequent albums. Mirsky also contributed a cover of George Harrison's "Don't Bother Me" to a 2002 tribute album, He Was Fab, as well as a cover of Rupert Holmes' "Escape (The Piña Colada Song)" to 2013's Drink a Toast to Innocence: A Tribute to Lite Rock. Among the musicians who have played on Mirsky's recordings are Jon Gordon, best known for his guitar work for Suzanne Vega, and Larry Saltzman, guitarist on a number of Simon & Garfunkel tours.

Formerly a student of New York University’s Graduate Institute of Film and Television, Mirsky worked as an assistant sound editor on the films What's Eating Gilbert Grape, Carlito's Way and The Bonfire of the Vanities, and as a sound effects editor on the films Chicago and A Beautiful Mind, both of which won Academy Awards for Best Picture. Mirsky also appeared as a contestant on Jeopardy! in January 1988, finishing in second place.

== Discography ==
- Songs About Girls (& Other Painful Subjects) (Mirsky Mouse Records, 1996)
- Get Ready for Eytan! (M-Squared Records, 1999)
- Was It Something I Said? (M-Squared Records, 2001) — features "(I Just Wanna Be) Your Steve McQueen" from The Tao of Steve
- Everyone's Having Fun Tonight! (M-Squared Records, 2004) — features "Happiness" and "American Splendor"
- Year of the Mouse (M-Squared Records, 2012)
- Funny Money (Mirsky Mouse Records, 2016)
- If Not Now...Later (Mirsky Mouse Records, 2019)
