= Get Ready for Eytan! =

Studio album by Eytan Mirsky
- Released: 1999
- Recorded: 1999
- Genre: Pop
- Label: Mirsky Mouse Records
- Producer: Eytan Mirsky

Eytan Mirsky chronology
Songs About Girls (& Other Painful Subjects) (1996)	Get Ready for Eytan! (1999)	Was It Something I Said? (2001)

Get Ready for Eytan! is the second album recorded by singer-songwriter Eytan Mirsky, released in 1999.

Professional ratings
Review scores
Source	Rating
AllMusic	4.5/5 stars

== Track listing ==
1. "Outta Sight"
2. "What Do I Do?"
3. "Life of a Pretty Girl"
4. "Somebody to Blame"
5. "Allergic to Fun"
6. "Tell Me That You're Foolin'"
7. "Found"
8. "Weren't You the One?"
9. "The Vulture of Love"
10. "All the Guys You Loved Before"
11. "Either Way"
12. "Something About the Night"

Bonus tracks

13. "Record Collection"
14. "Drop That Loser"
