= Shari Springer Berman and Robert Pulcini =

American filmmakers

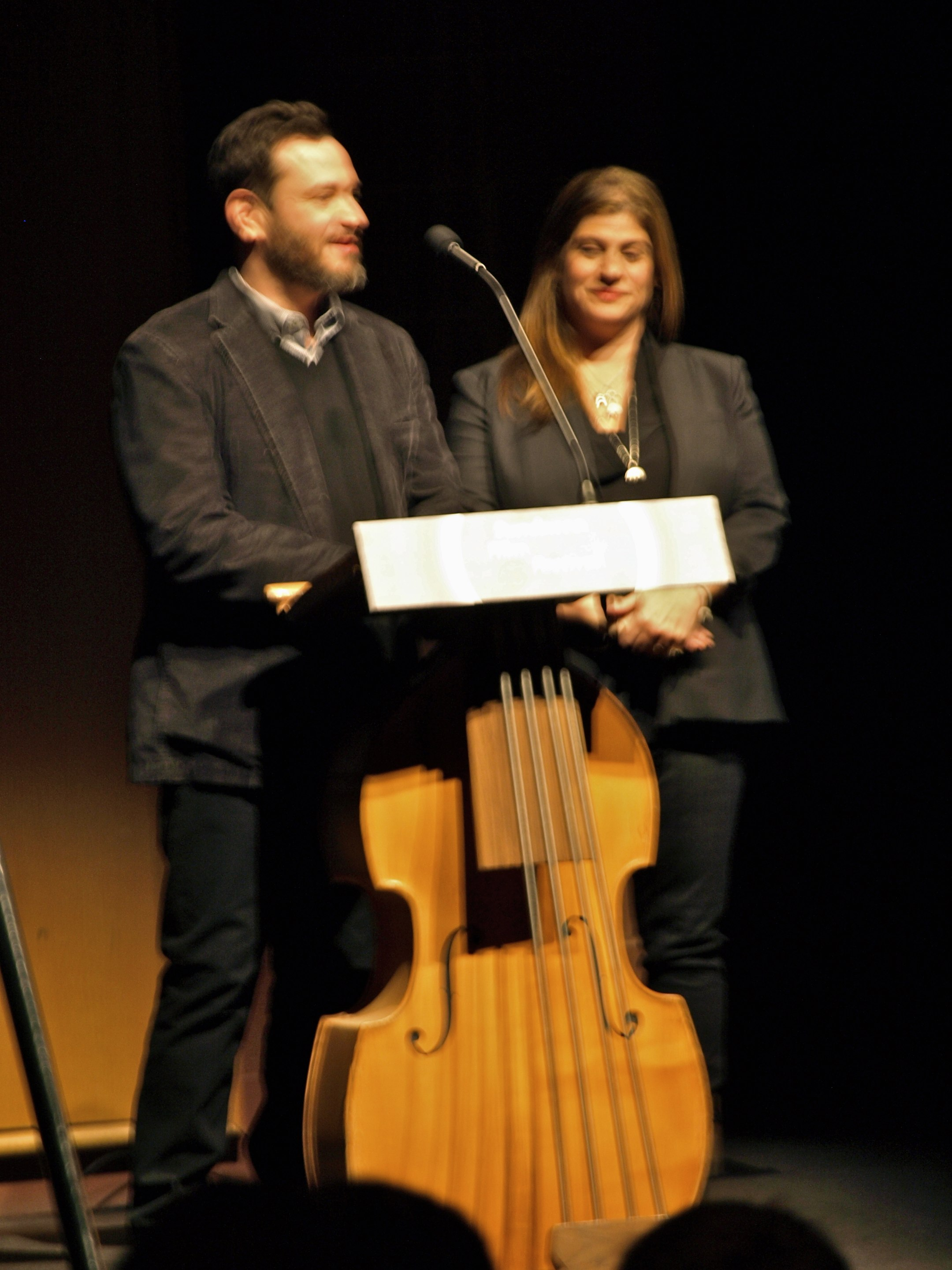
- Robert Pulcini (left) and Shari Springer Berman at the 2018 Sundance Film Festival
- Born: Springer Berman: July 13, 1963 (age 63); Pulcini: August 24, 1964 (age 62)
- Education: Springer Berman: Wesleyan University; Columbia University Pulcini: Rutgers University-Camden; Columbia University
- Occupations: Film directors, screenwriters
- Spouse: (married 1994)

Shari Springer Berman (born July 13, 1963) and Robert Pulcini (born August 24, 1964) are an American team of filmmakers.

== Biographies ==
Both Springer Berman and Pulcini were born in New York, New York. Springer Berman graduated from Wesleyan University (Phi Beta Kappa) and Pulcini graduated from Rutgers University-Camden. Both filmmakers received master's degrees in film from Columbia University. The couple married in 1994. Springer Berman is Jewish, and Pulcini is of Italian descent.

The two have a "rule" in which they often alternate whose name comes first in the credits of their movies, of which Berman says "There’s no meaning behind it. It’s very random!"

== Career ==
They received critical acclaim and an Academy Award nomination for their 2003 film American Splendor.

In 2010, The Extra Man premiered at the Sundance festival. The Emmy-winning Cinema Verite, a 2011 HBO Drama film directed by Berman and Pulcini, premiered on April 23, 2011.

The pair branched out into directing for television in 2019.

== Awards and nominations ==
With their first feature film American Splendor, Springer Berman and Pulcini earned an Academy Award nomination for Best Adapted Screenplay.

Awards won for American Splendor

- Boston Film Critics (Best Screenplay)
- Central Ohio Film Critics (Best Adapted Screenplay)
- Chicago Film Critics (Most Promising Performers)
- Los Angeles Film Critics (Best Screenplay)
- National Society of Film Critics (Best Screenplay)
- New York Film Critics (Best First Film)
- Online Film Critics (Best Breakthrough Filmmakers)
- San Diego Film Critics (Best Adapted Screenplay)
- Sundance Grand Jury Prize (Dramatic)
- Toronto Film Critics (Best First Feature)
- Writers Guild of America (WGA) (Best Adapted Screenplay)

== Filmography ==
=== Movies ===
- Off the Menu: The Last Days of Chasen's (1997)
- The Young and the Dead (2000)
- Hello, He Lied & Other Truths from the Hollywood Trenches (2002)
- American Splendor (2003)
- Wanderlust (2006)
- The Nanny Diaries (2007)
- The Extra Man (2010)
- Cinema Verite (2011)
- Girl Most Likely (2012)
- Ten Thousand Saints (2015)
- Things Heard & Seen (2021)

=== Television ===
- Shameless season 9, episode 12 "You'll Know the Bottom When You Hit It" (2019)
- Succession:
  - season 2, episode 4 "Safe Room" (2019)
  - season 3, episode 4 "Lion in the Meadow" (2021)
  - season 4, episode 7 "Tailgate Party" (2023)
- Night Sky: season 1, episode 4 "Boilermakers" (2022)
- WeCrashed season 1, episode 8 "The One With all the Money" (2022)
- Only Murders in the Building
  - season 3, episode 8 "Sitzprobe" (2023)
  - season 4, episode 7 "Valley of the Dolls" (2024)
  - season 4, episode 8 "Lifeboat" (2024)
  - season 5, episode 5 "Tongue Tied" (2025)
  - season 5, episode 6 "Flatbush" (2025)
- The Four Seasons
  - season 1, episode 1 "Lake House" (2025)
  - season 1, episode 2 "Garden Party" (2025)

=== Actor ===
Robert Pulcini

- American Splendor (2003) - "Bob the Director"
