= Hope Davis =

American actress (born 1964)

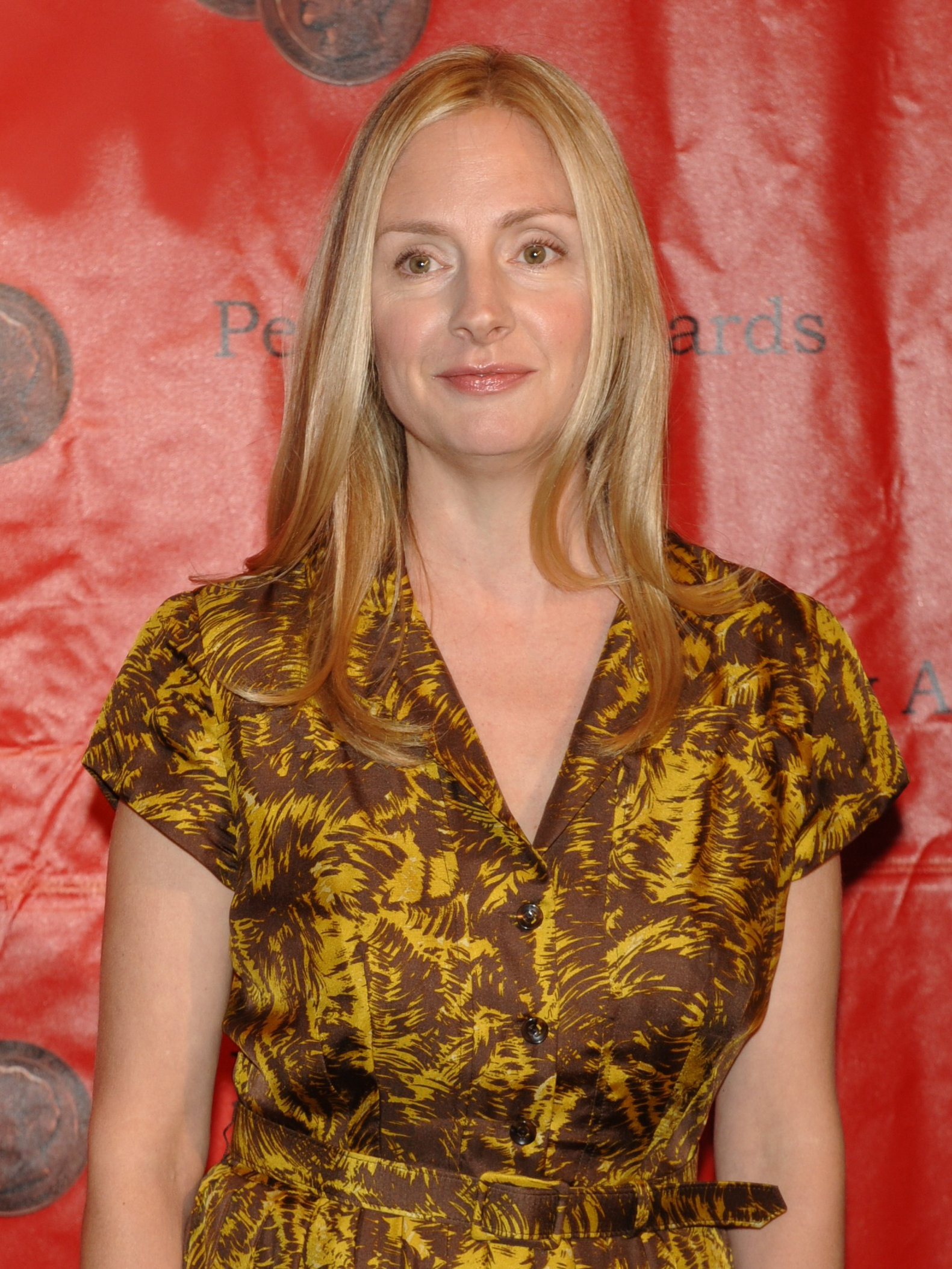
- Davis in 2010
- Born: March 23, 1964 (age 62); Englewood, New Jersey, U.S.
- Education: Vassar College (BA)
- Occupation: Actress
- Years active: 1989–present
- Spouse: Jon Patrick Walker
- Children: 2

Hope Davis (born March 23, 1964) is an American actress. Her accolades include nominations for three Emmy Awards, two Golden Globe Awards, and a Tony Award.

She made her film debut in Joel Schumacher's Flatliners in 1990. She has gone on to star in the critically acclaimed films The Daytrippers (1996), About Schmidt (2002), Infamous (2006), and Asteroid City (2023). She received a Golden Globe Award for Best Supporting Actress – Motion Picture nomination for her role in American Splendor (2003). She received an Independent Spirit Award with the cast of Synecdoche, New York (2008). In 2016, she joined the Marvel Cinematic Universe portraying Tony Stark's mother Maria Stark in Captain America: Civil War (2016).

In 1992, she made her Broadway theatre debut in Two Shakespearean Actors. In 1997 she starred as Sasha in Ivanov opposite Kevin Kline and Marian Seldes. She earned acclaim for her role in Yasmina Reza's God of Carnage in 2009 acting alongside Jeff Daniels, Marcia Gay Harden, and James Gandolfini. For her performance she received a nomination for the Tony Award for Best Actress in a Play.

Hope's early television roles include the Dick Wolf NBC series Deadline (2000–2001) and the ABC drama Six Degrees (2006–2007). She later earned Primetime Emmy Award nominations for her performances in the HBO projects In Treatment (2009), The Special Relationship (2010), and Succession (2021–2023). Her other notable roles include in Mildred Pierce (2011), The Newsroom (2012–2013), and Your Honor (2020–2023).

== Early life and education ==
Davis, second of three children, was born in Englewood, New Jersey, the daughter of Joan, a librarian, and William Davis, an engineer. Davis has described her mother as a "great storyteller" who would take Davis and her siblings to museums or to "something cultural" every Sunday after church. Davis was raised in Tenafly, New Jersey, and graduated in 1982 from Tenafly High School.

She was a childhood friend of Mira Sorvino, who lived almost directly across the street, and with whom she wrote and acted in backyard plays. Davis has a degree in cognitive science from Vassar College. She studied acting at HB Studio in New York City.

== Career ==
=== 1990–1999: Early work and theatre debut ===
Davis made her debut as a dramatic actress in the Joel Schumacher directed psychological horror film Flatliners (1990), appearing as William Baldwin's fiancée. That same year she appeared in the hit family film Home Alone (1990) in a small role as a Parisian airport receptionist. Her major stage debut came after she starred in the Wisdom Bridge/Remains Theater co-production of David Mamet's play Speed-the-Plow for Joel Schumacher with William Petersen in Chicago in 1992. That same year she made her Broadway debut in Two Shakespearean Actors (1992) at the Cort Theatre. In 1995 she had her first starring role as Eliza Malone D'Amico in the Greg Mottola directed independent comedy-drama The Daytrippers acting opposite Liev Schreiber, Parker Posey, Anne Meara and Stanley Tucci. Janet Maslin of The New York Times wrote, "Ms. Meara, who plays her role like an old pro, and Ms. Davis, who has the makings of a young one, are part of a cast that easily makes the film worth seeing". In 1997 she returned to Broadway debut playing Sasha in the Anton Chekov play Ivanov at the Vivian Beaumont Theater at Lincoln Center. Davis acted alongside Kevin Kline, Jayne Atkinson, Tom McGowan, and Marian Seldes.

The following year she starred in independent romantic comedy film Next Stop Wonderland (1998) directed by Brad Anderson. Stephen Holden of The New York Times wrote of the film, "[It] isn't really much more than a beautifully acted, finely edited sitcom, but it creates and sustains an intelligent, seriocomic mood better than any recent film about the urban single life. If the movie at moments recalls As Good as It Gets, its characters are subtler and its vision of humanity more truthful." That same year she had a supporting role in the comedy The Impostors (1998) starring Oliver Platt and Stanley Tucci. These led her to roles in Hollywood films such as the thriller Arlington Road (1999).

=== 2000–2008: Established actress ===
Davis also appeared in an NBC short-lived drama series called Deadline with Oliver Platt in 2001. She played the ex-wife to Platt's character at a newspaper giant. She acted in the Alexander Payne directed comedy-drama About Schmidt playing the daughter of Warren R. Schmidt played Jack Nicholson. She was nominated for the New York Film Critics Circle Award for Best Supporting Actress for her performance. The following year she starred opposite Paul Giamatti in the movie adaptation of the Harvey Pekar comic American Splendor as the comic book version of Pekar's real-life wife, Joyce Brabner. For this role, Davis won the New York Film Critics Circle Award and was nominated for a Golden Globe Award for Best Supporting Actress.

Later, she had lead roles in the New York premiere of Rebecca Gilman's Spinning into Butter in 2000, and in the 2005 audio play Hope Leaves the Theater, written and directed by Charlie Kaufman. This was a segment of the sound-only production Theater of the New Ear, which debuted at St. Ann's Warehouse in Brooklyn, NY. The title actually refers to Davis's character "leaving the theater". In 2005 she took supporting roles in the black comedy The Matador, the John Madden directed drama Proof, and the Gore Verbinski comedy-drama The Weather Man. She portrayed socialite Slim Keith in the Truman Capote biopic Infamous starring Toby Jones. The following year she acted in the science fiction thriller The Nines (2007) and the coming-of-age film Charlie Bartlett (2007). She acted in Charlie Kaufman's directorial debut Synecdoche, New York (2008) playing Madeleine Gravis.

=== 2009–2019: Return to Broadway and other roles ===
Davis co-starred as the bitter and self-deprecating Mia with Golden Globe winner Gabriel Byrne in the second season (2009) of HBO's In Treatment, a dramatic series that tracks the backstory and progress of five patients during their series of psychological therapeutic sessions. Mia is a successful, unmarried malpractice attorney who returns to therapy with Dr. Paul Weston after a 20-year absence because of a lack of stability in her personal life. Also in 2009 Davis returned to Broadway starring in Yasmina Reza's play God of Carnage with Marcia Gay Harden, James Gandolfini and Jeff Daniels. The play surrounds two parents who come together to discuss a fight between their children. Davis played a Annette a wealth manager. The role earned her a nomination for the Tony Award for Best Leading Actress in a Play. The following year she portrayed Hillary Clinton in the BBC / HBO film The Special Relationship released in 2010. The film was written by Peter Morgan and also starred Michael Sheen and Dennis Quaid. She has received a nomination for Emmy Award for Outstanding Lead Actress – Miniseries or a Movie.

Davis took recurring roles playing Mrs. Forrester in the HBO limited series Mildred Pierce (2011) starring Kate Winslet and a fictional gossip columnist Nina Howard in The Newsroom (2012–2013) starring Jeff Daniels. Davis also starred in the short-lived NBC television drama, Allegiance (2015), where she plays Katya O'Connor, an ex-KGB agent. Her son works for the FBI/CIA, and Katya's family is brought back into action by the SVR in hopes that Alex, her son, can be swayed to join the SVR. In 2015, she was approached by Marvel to play Maria Stark, mother of Tony Stark in Captain America: Civil War. She also appeared in a reoccurring capacity on Wayward Pines (2015–2016) and American Crime (2016).

=== 2020–present ===
In 2020, Davis narrated The Truth About Fat episode of the PBS television series Nova. From 2020 to 2023 she took a main role as Gina Baxter in the Showtime series Your Honor starring Bryan Cranston. She took a recurring role as Sandi Furness in the HBO drama series Succession from 2021 to 2023. She was nominated for the Primetime Emmy Award for Outstanding Guest Actress in a Drama Series for her performance in 2022. She acted in the Wes Anderson comedy film Asteroid City (2023).

== Personal life ==
Davis is married to actor Jon Patrick Walker. They have two daughters.

== Acting credits ==
Key
†	Denotes films that have not yet been released

=== Film ===
Year	Title	Role	Notes
1990	Flatliners	Anne Coldren	
1990	Home Alone	French Ticket Agent	
1995	Run for Cover	Prescott's Secretary	
1995	Kiss of Death	Junior's Girlfriend	
1996	The Daytrippers	Eliza Malone D'Amico	
1996	Mr. Wrong	Annie Alston	
1997	The Myth of Fingerprints	Margaret	
1997	Guy	Camera	
1998	Next Stop Wonderland	Erin Castleton	
1998	The Impostors	Emily Essendine	
1999	Arlington Road	Brooke Wolfe	
1999	Mumford	Sofie Crisp	
2000	Joe Gould's Secret	Therese Mitchell	
2001	Final	Dr. Ann Johnson	
2001	Hearts in Atlantis	Liz Garfield	
2002	About Schmidt	Jeannie Schmidt	
2002	The Secret Lives of Dentists	Dana Hurst	
2003	American Splendor	Joyce Brabner	
2005	The Matador	Carolyn 'Bean' Wright	
2005	Duma	Kristin	
2005	Proof	Claire Llewellyn	
2005	The Weather Man	Noreen Spritzel	
2006	Infamous	Slim Keith	
2006	The Hoax	Andrea Tate	
2007	The Nines	Sarah / Susan Howard / Sierra	
2007	Charlie Bartlett	Marilyn Bartlett	
2008	Synecdoche, New York	Madeleine Gravis	
2008	Genova	Marianne	
2009	The Lodger	Ellen Bunting	
2011	The Family Tree	Bunnie Burnett	
2011	Real Steel	Aunt Debra	
2012	Disconnect	Lydia Boyd	
2013	Louder Than Words	Brenda Fareri	
2015	Wild Card	Cassandra	
2016	Captain America: Civil War	Maria Stark	
2017	Rebel in the Rye	Miriam Salinger	
2020	Greenland	Judy Vento	
2023	Cat Person	Kelly	
2023	Asteroid City	Sandy Borden	
2025	The Phoenician Scheme	Mother Superior	
2025	The Mastermind	Sarah Mooney	
2026	See You When I See You	Paige Whistler	
2026	The Brink of War	Nancy Reagan	
TBA	You Deserve Each Other †	Kathy Duncan	Completed

=== Television ===
Year	Title	Role	Notes
2000–2001	Deadline	Brooke Benton	Main role, 13 episodes
2006–2007	Six Degrees	Laura Morgan	Main role, 13 episodes
2009	In Treatment	Mia Nesky	Main role, 7 episodes
2010	The Special Relationship	Hillary Clinton	Television film
2011	Mildred Pierce	Mrs. Forrester	Miniseries, 3 episodes
2011	Spring//Fall	Eden	Television film
2012–2013	The Newsroom	Nina Howard	Recurring role, 5 episodes
2013–2021	Law & Order: Special Victims Unit	Viola Mesner	2 episodes
2013	The Ordained	Packy	Television film
2015	Allegiance	Katya O'Connor	Main role, 13 episodes
2015	Last Week Tonight with John Oliver	Herself	1 episode
2015–2016	Wayward Pines	Megan Fisher	Main role, 14 episodes
2016	American Crime	Steph Sullivan	Recurring role, 7 episodes
2018–2019	For the People	Jill Carlan	Main role, 20 episodes
2018–2019	Strange Angel	Ruth Parsons	Recurring role, 7 episodes
2020	Nova	Narrator (voice)	1 episode
2020	Love Life	Claudia	Recurring role, 6 episodes
2020–2023	Your Honor	Gina Baxter	Main role, 20 episodes
2021–2023	Succession	Sandi Furness	Recurring role, 7 episodes
2022	Minx	Victoria Hartnett	1 episode
2023	Perry Mason	Camilla Nygaard	Recurring role, 6 episodes
2024	Before	Dr. Jane	Miniseries
2025	The American Revolution	Elizabeth Drinker (voice)	1 episode
2026	CIA	Stephanie Harris	1 episode
2026	Furious	Emma Easton	5 episodes
2026	Line of Fire	Jane Hollingsworth	Main role

=== Theater ===
Year	Title	Role	Venue	Ref.
1992	Goodnight Desdemona (Good Morning Juliet)	Juliet / Student / Soldier of Cyprus	East 13th Street Theatre, Off-Broadway	
1992	Two Shakespearean Actors	Miss Anne Holland	Cort Theatre, Broadway	
1993	Measure for Measure	Mariana	Delacorte Theater, Off-Broadway	
1993	Pterodactyls	Emma Duncan	Vineyard Theatre, Off-Broadway	
1995–1996	The Food Chain	Amanda	Westside Theatre, Off-Broadway	
1997–1998	Ivanov	Sasha	Vivian Beaumont Theatre, Broadway	
2000	Spinning Into Butter	Sarah	Lincoln Center, Off-Broadway	
2005	Hope Leaves the Theater	Various roles	St. Ann's Warehouse, Off-Broadway	
2007	The 24 Hour Plays	Hope	American Airlines Theatre, Broadway	
2009	The 23rd Annual Easter Bonnet Competition	Judge	Minskoff Theatre, Broadway	
2009	God of Carnage	Annette	Bernard B. Jacobs Theatre, Broadway	
2016–2017	The Red Barn	Ingrid Dodd	Royal National Theatre, London	
2026	What We Did Before Our Moth Days	Elaine	Barrow Street Theatre, Off-Broadway	

== Awards and nominations ==
Year	Award	Category	Nominated work	Result
1994	Drama Desk Awards	Outstanding Featured Actress in a Play	Pterodactyls	Nominated
2002	New York Film Critics Circle Awards	Best Supporting Actress	About Schmidt	Nominated
2003	Village Voice Film Poll	Best Supporting Performance	American Splendor	Nominated
2003	Seattle Film Critics Society	Best Actress	American Splendor	Won
2003	New York Film Critics Circle Awards	Best Actress	American Splendor & The Secret Lives of Dentists	Won
2004	National Society of Film Critics Awards	Best Actress	American Splendor & The Secret Lives of Dentists	Nominated
2004	Chicago Film Critics Association Awards	Best Actress	American Splendor	Nominated
2004	Phoenix Film Critics Society Awards	Best Supporting Actress	American Splendor	Nominated
2004	Central Ohio Film Critics Association	Best Supporting Actress	American Splendor	Nominated
2004	Chlotrudis Awards	Best Supporting Actress	American Splendor	Nominated
2004	Golden Globe Awards	Best Supporting Actress – Motion Picture	American Splendor	Nominated
2004	Satellite Awards	Best Actress – Motion Picture Musical or Comedy	American Splendor	Nominated
2004	Independent Spirit Awards	Best Supporting Female	The Secret Lives of Dentists	Nominated
2008	Gotham Independent Film Awards	Best Ensemble Cast	Synecdoche, New York	Won
2009	Independent Spirit Awards	Robert Altman Award	Synecdoche, New York	Won
2009	Tony Awards	Best Actress in a Play	God of Carnage	Nominated
2009	Primetime Emmy Awards	Outstanding Supporting Actress in a Drama Series	In Treatment	Nominated
2010	Satellite Awards	Best Actress – Miniseries or Television Film	The Special Relationship	Nominated
2010	Primetime Emmy Awards	Outstanding Lead Actress in a Miniseries or a Movie	The Special Relationship	Nominated
2011	Golden Globe Awards	Best Supporting Actress – Series, Miniseries or Television Film	The Special Relationship	Nominated
2021	Satellite Awards	Best Supporting Actress – Series, Miniseries or Television Film	Your Honor	Nominated
2022	Primetime Emmy Awards	Outstanding Guest Actress in a Drama Series	Succession	Nominated
