= Off the Menu: The Last Days of Chasen's =

1997 documentary film

- DVD cover
- Directed by: Shari Springer Berman; Robert Pulcini
- Produced by: Julia Strohm; Rob Grader
- Cinematography: Sandra Chandler; Ken Kobland
- Edited by: Robert Pulcini
- Music by: Mark Suozzo
- Production company: A la Carte Entertainment
- Distributed by: Northern Arts Entertainment
- Release date: 1997
- Running time: 90 minutes
- Country: United States
- Language: English

Off the Menu: The Last Days of Chasen's is a 1997 American documentary film about famous Los Angeles restaurant, Chasen's directed by Shari Springer Berman and Robert Pulcini.

== Background ==
Chasen's was one of the most exclusive restaurants in Los Angeles, established in 1936 and known for its celebrated film industry clientele and its chili. The chili was so famous that Elizabeth Taylor had it flown from Los Angeles to Rome, when she was in the studio filming Cleopatra.

Chasen's also served dignitaries and international royalty, as well as a succession of U.S. presidents. In 1995, after 60 years of service, Chasen's Restaurant closed. During its final weeks of operation, regular customers (actors and producers), staff, and management were interviewed about Chasen's and its history.

== Critical reception ==
Variety described the documentary as an entertaining history of "the glorious and sad death throes of one of the last vestiges of Hollywood's golden age." It observed that the film "is inadequately structured to fully realize its potential, but still serves up some delicious goodies that will be relished by showbiz connoisseurs." While acknowledging the number of Hollywood celebrities interviewed, Variety wrote "... the real stars of the docu are Chasen's longtime staff members, most of whom worked there for decades." It also noted that "Berman and Pulcini have taken full advantage of their privileged access and have not been shy with their camera, as it prowls around the jammed restaurant ever in search of anecdotes".

The New York Times praised the directors, writing that "their valuable, poignant and often funny film mingles behind-the-scenes views of the restaurant during its final week and interviews with, and reminiscences by, the dedicated core of its staff, as well as with the many luminaries who rushed back for a final visit." The review summarized the film as "generous in its appreciation of the staff that helped to make Chasen's so popular," and concluded that "Off the Menu is a poignant farewell."

Of the March 2004 DVD release, DVD Talk wrote that the film was "an engrossing though flawed documentary about the famous Beverly Hills eatery." In its analysis it observed that, "on the surface, the film appears little more than a wistful celebration, an elegiac tribute to what, in only a few more years, will be a completely extinct period of Hollywood history." It concluded that, "though it fails to live up to its potential, [the film] is a fun and sometimes insightful slice of Hollywood history, and a meditation on the nature of celebrity."

DVD Verdict makes note of the many celebrity interviews, but observe that "Most of the documentary is devoted to footage of and interviews with the Chasen's staff, many of whom worked there for decades and whose loyalty and devotion to the restaurant border on the fanatic," and offers that the film examines "the underlying theme of the cult of celebrity and the eagerness of people to debase themselves for the privilege of basking in reflected glamour." Noting further that the film "isn't so much a probing examination of Chasen's, as it is an affectionate, bittersweet farewell to an era and a culture that has long passed."

== Interviewees ==
Patrons of Chasen's who were interviewed included:

- Army Archerd
- Maureen Arthur
- David Brown
- Gary Coleman
- Pierre Cossette
- David Frost
- Neal Gabler
- Patrick Gallagher
- Tommy Gallagher
- Bob Hope
- Jimmy Jones
- Sally Kellerman
- Martin Landau
- Jack Lemmon
- Michael Lerner
- A. C. Lyles
- Carol Lynley
- Ed McMahon
- Margaret O'Brien
- Suzanne Pleshette
- Don Rickles
- Tom Snyder
- Rod Steiger
- Sharon Stone
- Donna Summer
- Robert Wagner
- Fay Wray
- Jane Wyman

== Awards and nominations ==
- 1997, won 'Best Documentary Feature' at the Hamptons International Film Festival
- 1998, won 'Special Jury Award' in the documentary competition at the Newport International Film Festival
