= Elias McConnell =

American actor

- Born: 1985 (age 40–41); Portland, Oregon, U.S.

Elias Comfort McConnell (born 1985) is an American former actor and model from Portland, Oregon, known for appearing in the 2003 film, Elephant.

== Career ==
In 2003, McConnell played a character of the same name in Gus Van Sant's film Elephant. The following year he was photographed by Mario Testino for the premiere issue of elite fashion magazine VMan. In 2006, he was cast in the role of Elie (segment "Le Marais") in the anthology film Paris, Je t'aime which had 22 different directors. In 2008 McConnell played a small role as "Telephone Tree #8" in the Gus Van Sant directed biographical film Milk. Followed closely by his 2009 role as "Young Hippy Boy" (Elias Comfort) in Jean-Claude Schlim's Luxembourgish-German drama film "House of Boys". In 2012 McConnell had a role in the Kevin Foong film Casting Room.

== Personal life ==
McConnell lived in Brooklyn, New York. He now lives in Portland, Oregon with his wife and son, where he works as a real estate agent.

== Filmography ==
Year	Title	Role	Notes
2003	Elephant	Elias	
2006	Paris, je t'aime	Elie	
2008	Milk	Telephone Tree	
2009	House of Boys	Young Hippy Boy	
