= The Secret Lives of Dentists =

- Theatrical release poster
- Directed by: Alan Rudolph
- Screenplay by: Craig Lucas
- Based on: The Age of Grief by Jane Smiley
- Produced by: George VanBuskirk; Campbell Scott
- Starring: Campbell Scott; Hope Davis; Denis Leary
- Cinematography: Florian Ballhaus
- Edited by: Andy Keir
- Music by: Gary DeMichele
- Production company: Holedigger Films
- Distributed by: Manhattan Pictures International
- Release dates: September 9, 2002 (TIFF); August 1, 2003 (United States)
- Running time: 104 minutes
- Country: United States
- Language: English
- Box office: $3,764,286

The Secret Lives of Dentists is a 2002 drama film directed by Alan Rudolph. The screenplay was written by Craig Lucas, based on the novella The Age of Grief by Jane Smiley. It had its world premiere at the 2002 Toronto International Film Festival and was subsequently screened at several other festivals, including Sundance and Cannes. It had a limited theatrical release in the United States on August 1, 2003.

The film won two awards from the New York Film Critics Circle, including Best Actress for Hope Davis and Best Screenplay for Craig Lucas.

== Plot ==
David and Dana Hurst are dentists who are married with three daughters and share a dental practice in Westchester County, New York. Dana is in the chorus of a community opera production, and when David goes backstage to give her a good luck charm, he sees her in the arms of another man. As he contemplates how to handle this, he begins having imaginary conversations with a difficult former patient. When the whole family gets the flu, everything is brought to a head.

== Cast ==
- Campbell Scott as David Hurst
- Hope Davis as Dana Hurst
- Denis Leary as Slater
- Robin Tunney as Laura
- Peter Samuel as Larry
- Jon Patrick Walker as Mark
- Gianna Beleno as Lizzie Hurst
- Lydia Jordan as Stephanie Hurst
- Cassidy Hinkle as Leah Hurst
- Adele D'man as Carol
- Kate Clinton as Elaine

== Production ==
The film was based on a novella by Jane Smiley, The Age of Grief which was published in 1987. Actor-producer Campbell Scott called the story "concise, achingly subjective, heartbreaking" thought he felt it was thoroughly inadaptable" as it all took place in the head of one character, a dentist who thinks his wife is being unfaithful.

A script was written by playwright Craig Lucas, who was working on it in 1992 with director Norman Rene; Lucas called Smiley's story "a beautiful, funny, quirky little book." A copy of this was read by Scott called it "suburban, interior, passive-aggressive, punctuated with bursts of surreal humor... Ingmar Bergman and Woody Allen rolled up into a family drama about avoiding the truth at all costs... hysterically funny." In 1995 it was announced a film would be made with Rene directing and starring Scott, Mary-Louise Parker and Ned Beatty. This version did not eventuate.

Scott eventually sent the script to Alan Rudolph, with whom he had made Mrs. Parker and the Vicious Circle. Rudolph agreed to make the film, calling Scott "maybe the best unknown, underrated actor of his generation" and saying the movie "was a dream experience."

== Critical reception ==
On review aggregator website Rotten Tomatoes, The Secret Lives of Dentists has an approval rating of 84% based on 94 reviews. The critics' consensus states, "A witty and honest look at marriage in decay." On Metacritic, the film has a score of 76 out of 100 based on 35 reviews, indicating "generally favorable reviews".

In a three-star review, Roger Ebert of the Chicago Sun-Times wrote, "What you will find [here] is a film with an uncanny feeling for the rhythms of daily life, acted by Scott and Davis with attention to those small inflections of speech that can turn words into weapons", adding that "Scott is wonderful here in the way he shows his character caring for the family while coming apart inside."

Mick LaSalle of the San Francisco Chronicle gave a warm review, writing "Lucas' script captures the intimacy of marriage and the ways in which married couple can easily fall into a pattern of irritation and recrimination. The film presents a realistic and artful treatment of a subject not often dealt with in cinema -- and rarely with honesty. Davis and Scott respond with heartfelt, edgy performances."

== Awards and nominations ==
Year	Group	Award	Nominee	Result	Ref.
2004	Independent Spirit Award	Best Supporting Female	Hope Davis	Nominated	
2003	NYFCC Award	Best Actress	Hope Davis	Won (Note: Also for American Splendor)	
2003	NYFCC Award	Best Screenplay	Craig Lucas	Won	
