= Elephant (2003 film) =

2003 drama film directed by Gus Van Sant

- Theatrical release poster
- Directed by: Gus Van Sant
- Written by: Gus Van Sant
- Produced by: Dany Wolf
- Starring: Alex Frost; Eric Deulen; John Robinson; Elias McConnell; Jordan Taylor; Carrie Finklea; Nicole George; Brittany Mountain; Alicia Miles; Kristen Hicks; Bennie Dixon; Nathan Tyson; Timothy Bottoms; Matt Malloy; Ellis E. Williams
- Cinematography: Harris Savides
- Edited by: Gus Van Sant
- Production company: Meno Film Company
- Distributed by: Fine Line Features; HBO Films
- Release dates: May 2003 (Cannes); October 24, 2003 (U.S.)
- Running time: 81 minutes
- Country: United States
- Language: English
- Budget: $3 million
- Box office: $10 million

Elephant is a 2003 American psychological drama film written, directed and edited by Gus Van Sant. Inspired by the 1999 Columbine High School massacre, the film chronicles the events surrounding a school shooting in Portland, Oregon. The narrative begins a short time before the shooting occurs, following the lives of several characters both in and out of school, who are unaware of what is about to unfold. The film stars mostly unknown or newcomer actors, including John Robinson, Alex Frost, and Eric Deulen.

Elephant is the second film in Van Sant's "Death Trilogy"—the first is Gerry (2002) and the third Last Days (2005)—all three of which are based on real events. Although Elephant was controversial for its subject matter and allegations of influence on the Red Lake shootings, it was generally praised by critics and received the Palme d'Or at the 2003 Cannes Film Festival.

== Plot ==
On April 20, 1999, an ordinary day at a high school in Portland, Oregon, is shown through the perspective of several students. Among them are John, who has a strained relationship with his alcoholic father; Elias, a photography student who is building a portfolio of other students; Michelle, an outcast who struggles with her body issues; Nicole, Brittany, and Jordan, three bulimic teens who gripe about their parents; popular athlete and lifeguard Nathan and his girlfriend, Carrie; and Acadia, a close friend of John and a member of the school's gay–straight alliance (GSA).

Unbeknownst to anyone, two other students, Alex and Eric, are preparing to carry out a mass shooting and bomb attack at their school. Their motives are vague and inconclusive, with several scenes showing them being bullied and exposed to violent media. Flashbacks throughout the film show them preparing for the massacre by ordering weapons online and formulating an attack plan, which is to detonate bombs in the cafeteria during lunch hour and shoot people as they try to escape.

On the day of the shooting, the pair makes their way to school in Alex's car, armed with a rifle, a shotgun, and several pistols. John encounters them outside the school and is told by Alex to leave. Realizing what is about to happen, John tries to warn students and teachers outside, then goes looking for his father after finding his car outside the school.

Inside the school, the bombs that Alex and Eric had planted fail to go off, so they decide to start shooting indiscriminately. The pair heads to the library and opens fire on the students there, killing Elias (who photographs them right before they start shooting), Michelle, and others. Other students and teachers in the building hear the gunfire and begin to evacuate.

The gunmen then split up and head to opposite ends of the school. Alex enters the girls' bathroom where he surprises Nicole, Brittany, and Jordan, presumably killing all three. While attending a GSA meeting, Acadia witnesses a student being shot dead in the corridor and becomes frozen in fear before being rescued by Benny, a student athlete who helps her out a window before deciding to find the gunmen. Outside the school, John finds his now-sober father, who tries to comfort him as they observe the attack.

In the corridor, Eric encounters Mr. Luce, the principal, and chastises him for treating children like himself and Alex poorly. Benny encounters the two and is shot dead. Eric then seemingly lets Mr. Luce go, only to kill him moments later.

Alex and Eric reunite in the cafeteria, now strewn with overturned chairs, backpacks, bodies, and half-eaten lunches. The pair have a brief conversation about who they've shot, which ends when Alex suddenly shoots Eric mid-sentence. Showing no emotion over killing Eric, Alex heads to the kitchen and discovers Carrie and Nathan hiding in a freezer. He tauntingly recites "Eeny, meeny, miny, moe" to them to decide whom he should kill first, though the screen cuts to black before he makes his decision, implying he killed both of them.

== Cast ==
- Alex Frost as Alex, the more intelligent of the two killers, implied to be the one in charge. He is an accomplished but frustrated pianist and sketch artist.
- Eric Deulen as Eric, a slacker, Alex's friend, and the other killer. He is less intelligent than Alex, and Alex is obviously aware of this. He is shot in the chest by Alex near the end of the film, while talking about whom he had killed earlier.
- John Robinson as John McFarland, Alex's friend who has trouble at school while managing his alcoholic father. Alex warns him and a few other people to stay away from the massacre.
- Timothy Bottoms as Mr. McFarland, John's alcoholic father.
- Matt Malloy as Mr. Luce, the principal of the school. Cornered by Eric, who briefly spares him, he is presumed dead after being shot several times.
- Elias McConnell as Elias, a photography student building his portfolio with portraits of other students.
- Nathan Tyson and Carrie Finklea as Nathan and Carrie, a popular lifeguard/football player and his girlfriend. Alex taunts them with Eeny, meeny, miny, moe.
- Kristen Hicks as Michelle, a nerdy girl ashamed of her body. The film follows her through the locker room and into the library where she assists, and it is there that she is the first to die in the massacre.
- Brittany Mountain, Jordan Taylor, and Nicole George as Brittany, Jordan, and Nicole, three bulimic girls who talk incessantly, gripe about parents, and squabble with one another.
- Bennie Dixon as Benny, an athletic student who helps Acadia escape out of a window before approaching Eric. He is shot and presumed dead.
- Alicia Miles as Acadia, a close friend of John and a member of the Gay-Straight Alliance. During the shooting, Benny discovers her standing still in a classroom and helps her escape from the school and the shooters.
- Ellis E. Williams as GSA teacher

== Production ==
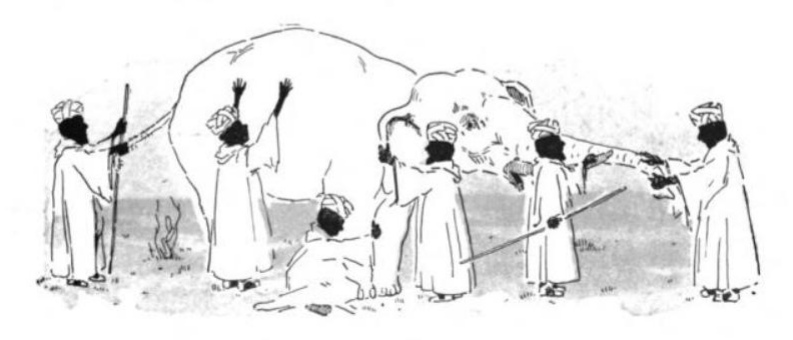
The title was inspired by the parable of the blind men and an elephant.

The film began as a documentary that Van Sant had intended to make about the Columbine High School massacre; the idea of a factual account was dropped.

Elephant was filmed in Van Sant's hometown, Portland, Oregon, in late 2002, on the former campus of Whitaker Middle School (previously Adams High School).

There was no initial script before the filming started. The script was "written" to its final form during shooting, with cast members improvising freely and collaborating in the direction of scenes. It was shot over 20 days.

JT LeRoy (a pen name for author Laura Albert) is credited as an associate producer for the film.

=== Title ===
Contrary to popular belief, the title Elephant is not a tribute to the 1989 BBC short film of the same name, directed by Alan Clarke. Van Sant learned of Clarke's film upon a recommendation from a producer after the producer had read the treatment for Elephant. Later, Van Sant discovered Clarke's film referred to the phrase "elephant in the room" (the collective denial of some obvious problem).

Also, Gus Van Sant named Chantal Akerman's film Jeanne Dielman, 23 quai du Commerce, 1080 Bruxelles (1975) as an inspiration.

Clarke's film Elephant reflects on sectarian violence in Northern Ireland. Van Sant's minimalist style and use of tracking shots mirrors Clarke's film.

== Reception and legacy ==
Elephant received mainly positive reviews from critics and has a score of 74% on Rotten Tomatoes based on 163 reviews with an average rating of 7.10/10. The critical consensus states "The movie's spare and unconventional style will divide viewers." The film also has a score of 70 out of 100 on Metacritic based on 37 critics indicating "generally favorable reviews".

Roger Ebert praised the film and gave it four out of four stars writing "Gus Van Sant's Elephant is a violent movie in the sense that many innocent people are shot dead. But it isn't violent in the way it presents those deaths. There is no pumped-up style, no lingering, no release, no climax. Just implacable, poker-faced, flat, uninflected death. Truffaut said it was hard to make an anti-war film because war was exciting even if you were against it. Van Sant has made an anti-violence film by draining violence of energy, purpose, glamor, reward and social context. It just happens. I doubt that Elephant will ever inspire anyone to copy what they see on the screen. Much more than the insipid message movies shown in social studies classes, it might inspire useful discussion and soul-searching among high school students."

=== Accolades ===
Award	Date of ceremony	Category	Recipient(s)	Result	Ref(s)
Bodil Awards	February 27, 2005	Best American Film	Gus Van Sant	Nominated	
Cannes Film Festival	May 14–25, 2003	Palme d'Or	Gus Van Sant	Won	
Cannes Film Festival	May 14–25, 2003	Best Director	Gus Van Sant	Won	
Cannes Film Festival	May 14–25, 2003	Cinema Prize of the French National Education System	Gus Van Sant	Won	
César Awards	February 21, 2004	Best Foreign Film	Gus Van Sant	Nominated	
French Syndicate of Cinema Critics	January 15, 2004	Best Foreign Film	Gus Van Sant	Won	
Independent Spirit Awards	February 28, 2004	Best Director	Gus Van Sant	Nominated	
Independent Spirit Awards	February 28, 2004	Best Cinematography	Harris Savides	Nominated	
Los Angeles Film Critics Association	January 7, 2004	Best Cinematography	Harris Savides	Runner-up	
National Society of Film Critics	January 3, 2004	Best Cinematography	Harris Savides	3rd place	
New York Film Critics Circle	December 15, 2003	Best Cinematography	Harris Savides	Won	

=== Shooting controversies ===
Rafael Solich, the perpetrator of the 2004 Carmen de Patagones school shooting, had watched the film days prior to the shooting.

The Red Lake shootings that occurred in 2005 were briefly blamed on the film, as it was viewed by gunman Jeff Weise 17 days prior to the event. A friend of Weise said that he brought the film over to a friend's house and skipped ahead to parts that showed two students planning and carrying out a school massacre. Although they talked about the film afterwards, Weise said and did nothing to make anyone suspect what he was planning.

During the Suzano school shooting that occurred in 2019, both perpetrators were seen wearing clothing that resembled that of the main characters of Elephant.

== In popular culture ==
In the 2023 police procedural tactical shooter video game Ready or Not, a school-shooting mission by the same name, "Elephant", is featured in the game. It is heavily inspired by the movie.

== See also ==
- Eric Harris and Dylan Klebold, the students behind the Columbine High School massacre
- Bowling for Columbine, a documentary about gun violence in America with emphasis on the Columbine massacre
- Duck! The Carbine High Massacre, a film made in 1999 inspired by the Columbine High School massacre
- Heart of America, a 2002 film revolving around a school massacre
- Zero Day, a 2002 film inspired by the Columbine High School massacre
- The Only Way, a 2004 independent film inspired by the Columbine High School massacre
- 2:37, a 2006 film set in Australia that follows the same style
- Mass, a 2021 film involving grieving parents who meet to discuss the aftermath of a school shooting
