= 2003 New York Film Critics Circle Awards =

69th New York Film Critics Circle Awards

69th New York Film Critics Circle Awards

January 11, 2004

Best Picture:
The Lord of the Rings:
The Return of the King

The 69th New York Film Critics Circle Awards, honoring the best in film for 2003, were announced on 15 December 2003 and presented on 11 January 2004 by the New York Film Critics Circle.

== Winners ==
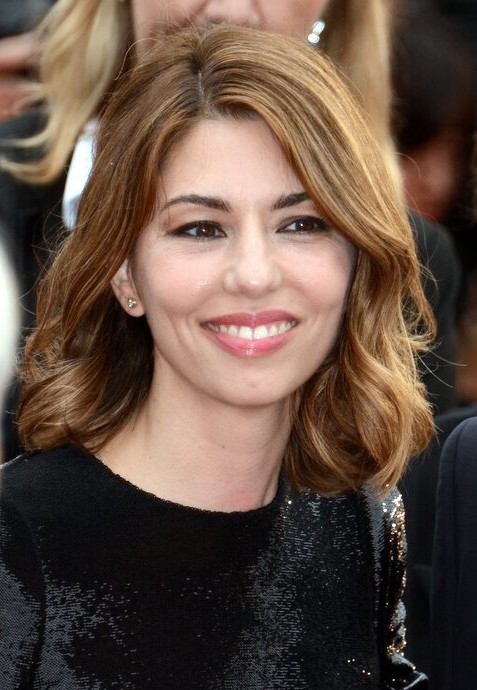
Sofia Coppola, Best Director winner

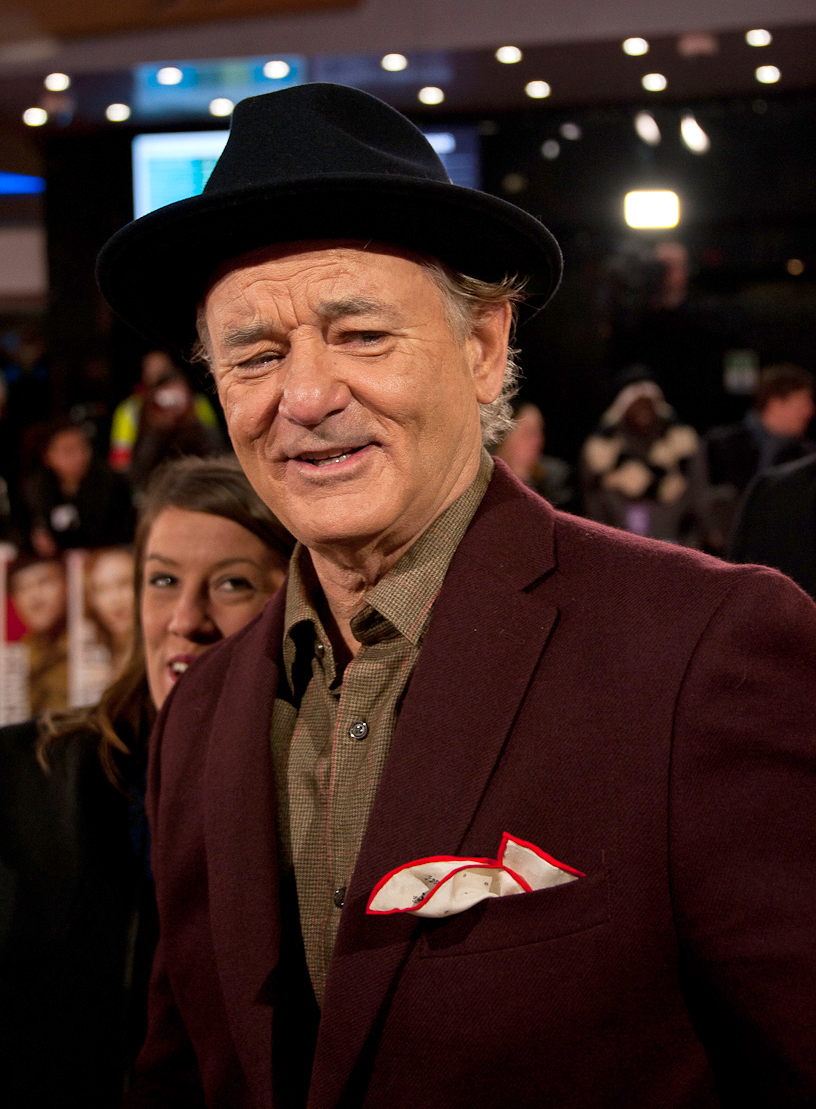
Bill Murray, Best Actor winner

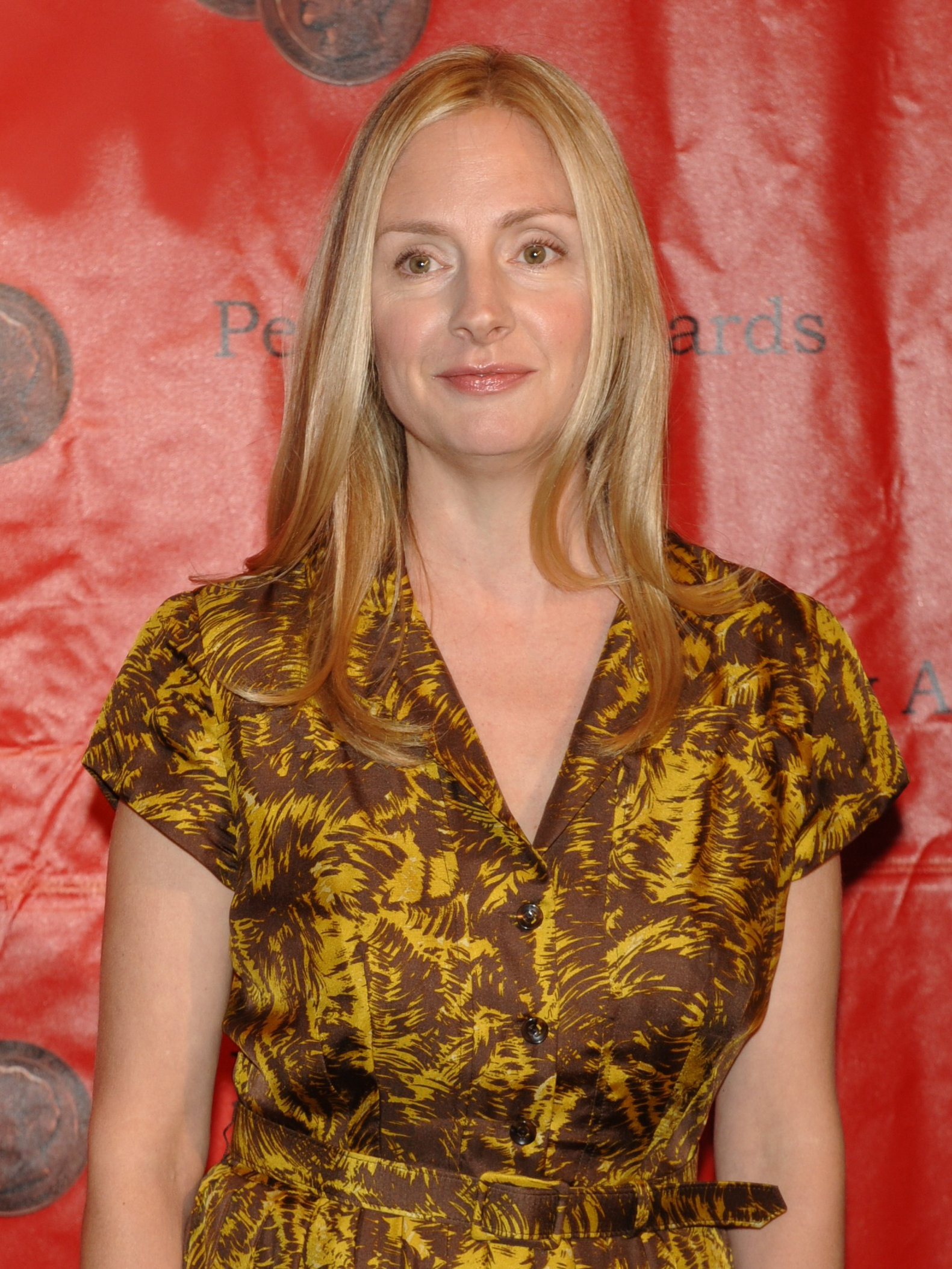
Hope Davis, Best Actress winner

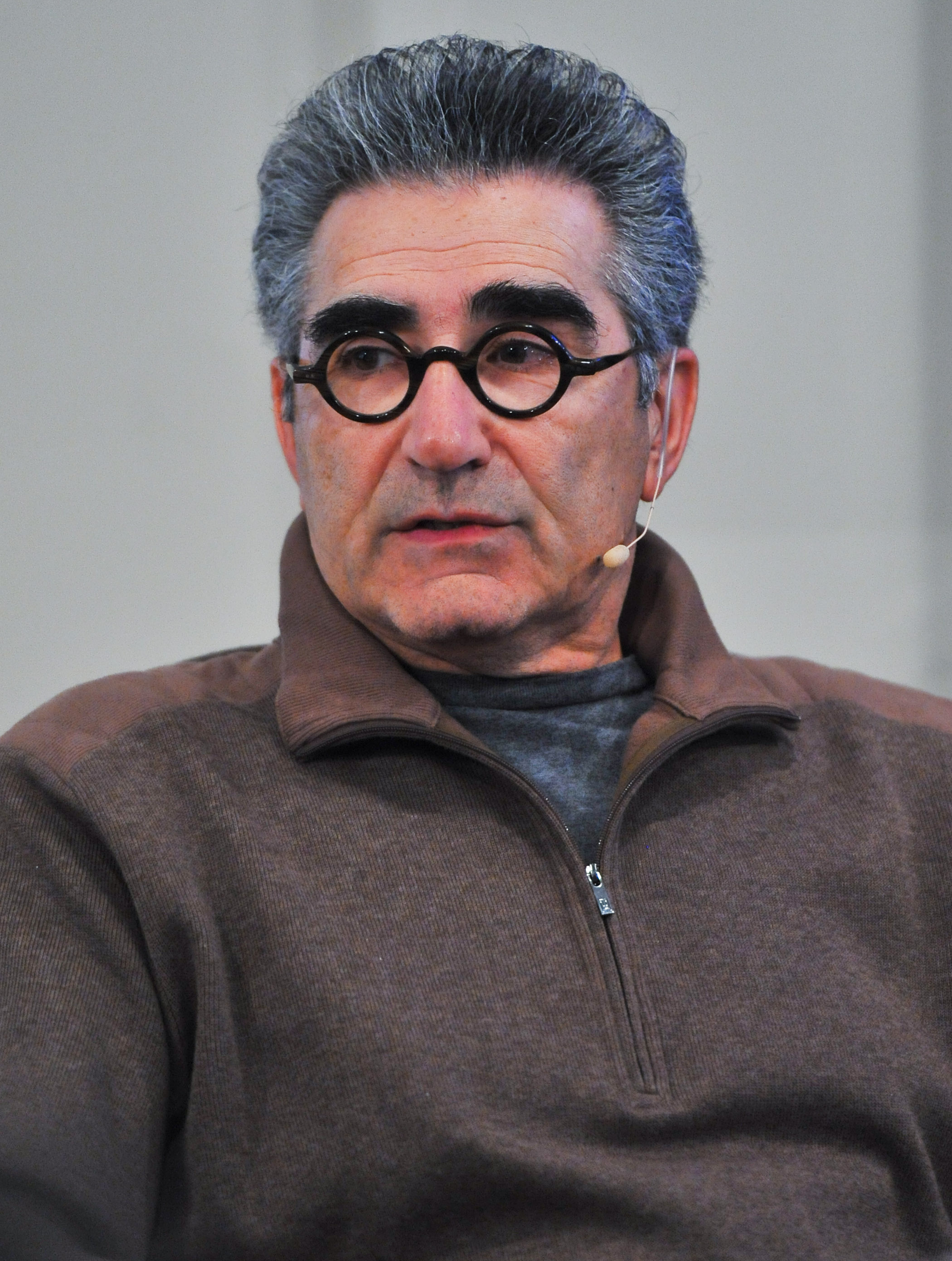
Eugene Levy, Best Supporting Actor winner

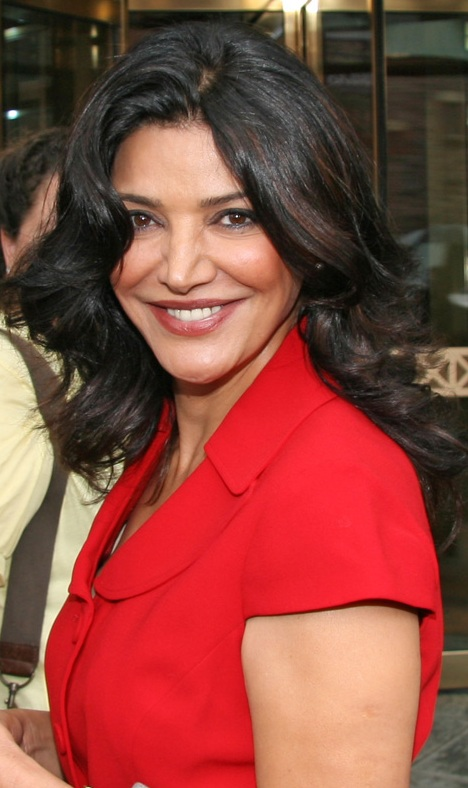
Shohreh Aghdashloo, Best Supporting Actress winner

- Best Actor:
  - Bill Murray – Lost in Translation
  - Runners-up: Sean Penn – Mystic River and Jack Black – School of Rock
- Best Actress:
  - Hope Davis – American Splendor and The Secret Lives of Dentists
  - Runners-up: Naomi Watts – 21 Grams and Charlize Theron – Monster
- Best Animated Film:
  - The Triplets of Belleville (Les triplettes de Belleville)
  - Runner-up: Finding Nemo
- Best Cinematography:
  - Harris Savides – Elephant and Gerry
- Best Director:
  - Sofia Coppola – Lost in Translation
  - Runner-up: Peter Jackson – The Lord of the Rings: The Return of the King
- Best Film:
  - The Lord of the Rings: The Return of the King
  - Runners-up: Mystic River, American Splendor, and Lost in Translation
- Best First Film:
  - Shari Springer Berman and Robert Pulcini – American Splendor
- Best Foreign Language Film:
  - City of God (Cidade de Deus) • Brazil/France/United States
  - Runner-up: The Man Without a Past (Mies vailla menneisyyttä) • Finland
- Best Non-Fiction Film:
  - Capturing the Friedmans
  - Runner-up: The Fog of War
- Best Screenplay:
  - Craig Lucas – The Secret Lives of Dentists
  - Runners-up: Steven Knight – Dirty Pretty Things and Sofia Coppola – Lost in Translation
- Best Supporting Actor:
  - Eugene Levy – A Mighty Wind
- Best Supporting Actress:
  - Shohreh Aghdashloo – House of Sand and Fog
