= Was It Something I Said? (album) =

Studio album by Eytan Mirsky
- Released: 2001
- Recorded: 2001
- Genre: Pop
- Label: M-Squared Records
- Producer: Eytan Mirsky

Eytan Mirsky chronology
Get Ready for Eytan! (1999)	Was It Something I Said? (2001)	Everyone's Having Fun Tonight! (2004)

Was It Something I Said? is the third album recorded by singer-songwriter Eytan Mirsky, released in 2001.

Professional ratings
Review scores
Source	Rating
AllMusic	4/5 stars

== Track listing ==
1. "When Good Girls Go Bad"
2. "Love Is for Girls"
3. "Just Another in a Long Long Line"
4. "Can't Make Up My Mind"
5. "Leaving You"
6. "Can I Get Any Lower?"
7. "Do I Have to Say It?"
8. "Meet Some Girls"
9. "Only Hurting Myself"
10. "All the Things to Do When She Says No"
11. "Sluts!"
12. "When You're a Human Being"
13. "Payback"
14. "You Don't Know Her"

Bonus tracks

15. "(I Just Wanna Be) Your Steve McQueen" (from The Tao of Steve)
16. "Human Nature"
