= Pat O'Neill (filmmaker) =

American filmmaker (born 1939)

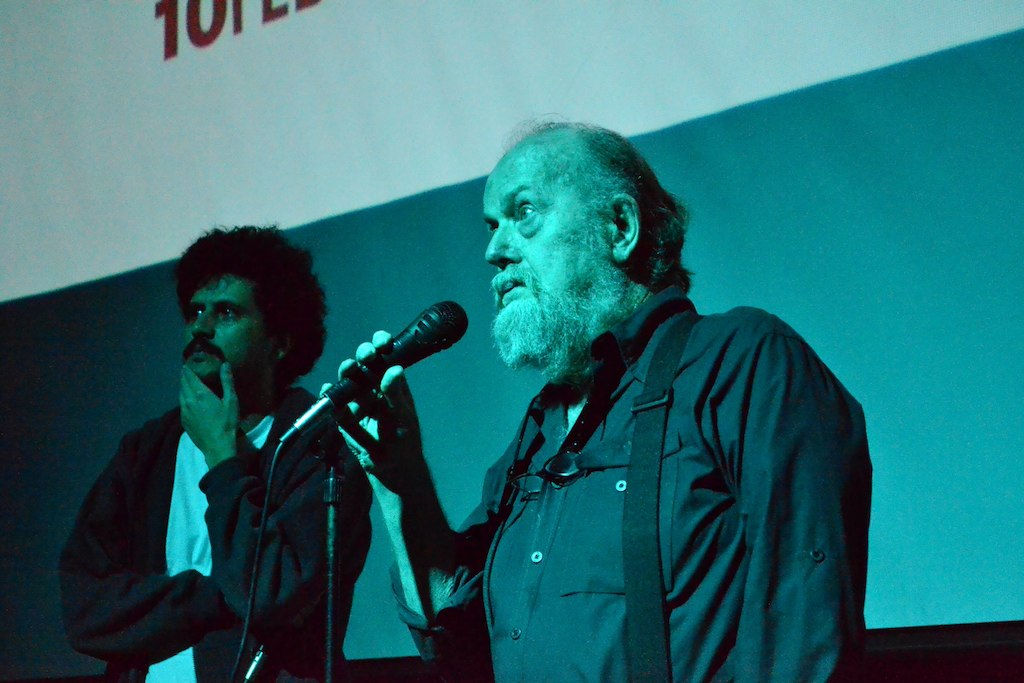
Pat O'Neill (right) in 2012.

Patrick O'Neill (born June 28, 1939 in Los Angeles, California) is an American independent experimental filmmaker and artist who has also worked in the special effects industry. Although his work embraces an extremely wide technical and aesthetic scope, he is perhaps best known for his startling, surrealistic, and humorous film compositions achieved through a mastery of the optical printer. His films and other artworks often reveal a complex and mysterious interest in the connections and clashes between the natural world and human civilization. O'Neill has also produced a prodigious body of work in drawing, collage, sculpture, installation, and many other media.

== Career ==
His early 16mm films include Runs Good (1971), Easyout (1971), and Down Wind (1973). His later 35mm films include Water and Power (1989), Trouble in the Image (1996), and The Decay of Fiction (2002). On December 30, 2008, Water and Power was added to the National Film Registry. Prints of O'Neill's films are held in numerous archives and museums around the world; his complete collection resides at the Academy Film Archive, where several of his short works—including By the Sea, Bump City, and 7362—have been preserved. Two of O'Neill's longer films have also been preserved by the Academy in collaboration with O'Neill: Water and Power, in 2009, and Trouble in the Image, in 2016.

He has also taught at the California Institute of the Arts. He influenced a generation of CalArts students, who include Adam Beckett, Robert Blalack, Chris Casady, and Larry Cuba, who all later went on to work on the special effects of the original Star Wars.

== Filmography ==
- By the Sea (with Robert Abel) (1963)
- Bump City (1964)
- 7362 (1965–67)
- Coming Down (aka Heresy) (1968) (promo film for The United States of America)
- Screen (1969)
- Runs Good (1971)
- Easyout (1972)
- The Last of the Persimmons (1972)
- Down Wind (1973)
- Saugus Series (1974)
- Sidewinder's Delta (1976)
- Two Sweeps (1977)
- Foregrounds (1978)
- Sleeping Dogs (Never Lie) (1978)
- Let's Make a Sandwich (1982)
- Water and Power (1989)
- Trouble in the Image (1996)
- Coreopsis (1998)
- Squirtgun Step Print (1998)
- The Decay of Fiction (2002)
- Horizontal Boundaries (2008)
- I Put Out my Hands (2009)
- I Open the Window (2009)
- Starting to go Bad (2009)
- Painter & Ball 4-14 (2010)
- Ojo Caliente (2012)
- Where the Chocolate Mountains (2015)
