= The Decay of Fiction =

2002 film by Pat O'Neill

- Publicity and promotion still
- Directed by: Pat O'Neill
- Written by: Pat O'Neill
- Produced by: Rebecca Hartzell; Pat O'Neill
- Starring: Jaime Alvarez; Lilia Barsegian; Peter Beckman
- Cinematography: George Lockwood
- Edited by: Pat O'Neill
- Production company: Lookout Mountain Films
- Release dates: October 12, 2002 (New York Film Festival); September 22, 2006 (United States)
- Running time: 74 minutes
- Country: United States
- Language: English
- Budget: US$250,000

The Decay of Fiction is a 2002 American 35mm part color and part black-and-white experimental film noir project directed by independent filmmaker and artist Pat O'Neill. The film, initially conceived as a documentary, was produced by O'Neill and Rebecca Hartzell for Lookout Mountain Films. Filming took place in Los Angeles.

The film is set at the site of the old Ambassador Hotel in Los Angeles. It has no identifiable plot and features no recurring characters. An estimated budget of $250,000 was put forth to fund the film and it took eight years to complete. It premiered on October 12, 2002, at the New York Film Festival. The film has also been screened at six other film festivals and at eight non-festival exhibitions. It received generally favorable reviews. Multiple critics commented on the film's visual appeal.

== Production ==
The movie was directed by filmmaker Pat O'Neill and produced by O'Neill and Rebecca Hartzell. O'Neill turned the historic Ambassador Hotel of Los Angeles into a haunted mansion full of specters using a mixture of "35mm location shooting and a digital overlay". He worked with 45 actors and took eight years to complete his film. It has been described as the most complicated of O'Neill's works to that date. O'Neill has said that it was "a huge bust financially"; it was made on an estimated US$250,000 budget. Pat O'Neill mentioned the film as early as 1997 in an interview with David James. It was then referred to as the "Ambassador film" and called a "documentary". While still a work in progress, excerpts were shown at the Los Angeles Museum of Contemporary Art's Ahmanson Theatre in September 2002.

== Storyline ==
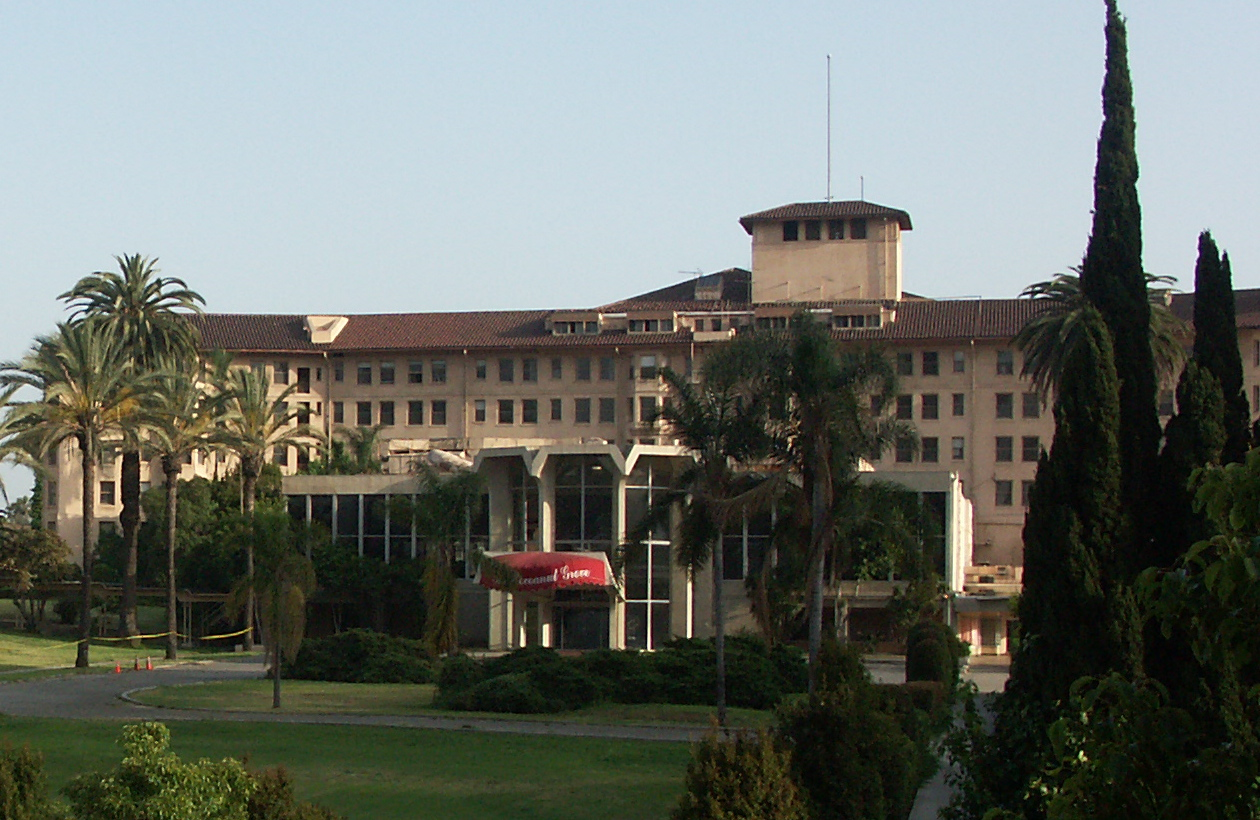
The Ambassador Hotel, pictured 2004

According to O'Neill, the film is an "intersection of fact and hallucination". It is set inside the decaying halls of the closed Ambassador Hotel, former home to the Cocoanut Grove restaurant and the first Academy Awards ceremonies. The film superimposes reenactments of classic Hollywood films onto shots of the dilapidated establishment, with ghostly gangsters and their gun molls interacting with icy blondes and wisecracking bartenders in carefully deconstructed snatches of dialogue. O'Neill's time-lapse photography lends the film an ethereal effect that serves an intentionally distancing purpose. In this study of the historic Hollywood edifice, there is no discernible plot and there are no recurring characters. The film construction has the appearance of snippets taken from lost films of the 1940s; it uses surreal vignettes of nude men and women, stop-motion animated mannequin torsos, flickering film projections and dim light bulbs to create what devolves in a sense of nightmares, giving a result that feels more like an art installation than the expected film.

When displayed in museum exhibitions, the interactive DVD installation is called Tracing the Decay of Fiction. The presentation is shown in a continuous loop and allows museum patrons to explore the narrative and create their own stories.

== Cast ==
- Jaime Alvarez as Bar Patron
- Lilia Barsegian as Hotel Guest
- Peter Beckman as Unnamed Ghost
- Dan Bell as Detective
- Damon Collazo as Mafia Boss
- Kane Crawford as Thug/Detective/Tourist
- Michael D. Hartzell as Ghost Man

- William Lewis as Guest
- Lauren Maher as Chica
- Tamara Margarian as Woman in a wheelchair
- Lisa Moncure as Rita
- Julio Perillán as Actor
- Michael Q. Schmidt as Naked Ghost

== Screenings and release ==
=== Festivals ===
The Decay of Fiction had its festival premiere screening on October 12, 2002, at the New York Film Festival. Subsequent festival screenings include:

- International Film Festival Rotterdam (2003)
- San Francisco International Film Festival (2003). Shown with O'Neill's earlier films Squirtgun/Step Print (1998) and Coreopsis (1998)
- Wisconsin Film Festival (2003)
- Philadelphia Film Festival (2003)
- Athens International Film Festival as I parakmi tis mythoplasias (2003)
- London Film Festival (2003)

=== Exhibitions ===
The film had its non-festival premiere at the J. Paul Getty Museum in Los Angeles in 2003 and showcased in 2003 at Kiasma, a contemporary art museum in Helsinki, Finland. Later exhibitions include:

- Art Gallery of Ontario, Toronto, Ontario, Canada (2003). Shown with Bump City (1964) and Runs Good (1970) as part of a retrospective of O'Neill's work.
- Santa Monica Museum of Art's Bergamot Station exhibition "Views from Lookout Mountain" (2004).
- Nelson-Atkins Museum of Art, Kansas City, Missouri (2005)
- Centre de Cultura Contemporània de Barcelona, Spain (2005). Shown with Catalan language subtitles.
- Echo Park Film Center, Los Angeles as part of their June "filmmobile" program. (2010)
- Museum of the Moving Image, New York City (2012). Shown August through October as part of the "Film After Film" exhibition.

== Reception ==
Metacritic, which assigns a rating in the 0–100 range based on reviews from top mainstream critics, calculated an average score of 74 based on 6 reviews, indicating "generally favorable" reaction. Based on 7 reviews collected by review aggregator Rotten Tomatoes, the film received an 86% approval rating, with an average score of 7.2/10. Deborah Young of Variety commented that "The attention given to constructing each shot makes for a hypnotic visual experience, while lack of a progressive narrative telescopes film's running time into infinity." Brian McKay of eFilmCritic.com gave the film 3 stars and summed up his review saying of the film "[While it] is a visually intriguing piece, it also ends up being highly repetitious and overlong." The Village Voice praised the filmmaker for allowing the Ambassador Hotel, used many times previously as a film set, to represent itself and its own history. In their review wrote "In its abstract movie-ness, O'Neill's 73-minute fantasia exudes a wistful longing to connect, not so much with Hollywood history as with the history of that history".

Ed Gonzalez of Slant Magazine felt that "[t]he film's superimpositions, movie-dialogue samples, and audio-visual burps collectively suggest an acid trip, and as such will have a different disorienting effect on everyone who picks up its frequency". Jonathan Rosenbaum of Chicago Reader called the film a "treasure chest of narrative fragments" which "lacks the itinerary and 'instructions for use' that automatically comes with a linear story." He offered that the threads of the various "implied" plot lines are a result "of O'Neill's all-encompassing sense of form, which for better or worse is conceptual rather than technical or material" and wrote that the film evoked both Last Year at Marienbad (1961) and The Shining (1980), but that "it doesn't quite live up to the high standards" set by those earlier films. He concluded that while the film "seeps into one's bones with a chilling conviction and leaves behind a poignant aftertaste", the film's lack of linear narrative makes its totality "less brilliant than its parts—despite the meditative possibilities that its nonlinearity offers."

TV Guide reviewer Maitland McDonagh gave The Decay of Fiction nearly full marks (3.5 stars out of 4), saying that the result of the film was "hypnotic". Time Out London's film reviewer considered the film to be "all very elegant, teasing and occasionally haunting, but it does wear a little thin at times." J. Hoberman wrote in his 2012 book Film After Film: (Or, What Became of 21st Century Cinema?) that O'Neill "spectrally populated the abandoned Ambassador Hotel" with his film. Doug Harvey of LA Weekly called the film "his most accomplished hybrid to date, superimposing intricately choreographed actors going through vague but archetypal film noir routines on top of gorgeous full-color time-lapse footage of the entropy-shredded Ambassador Hotel". Stephen Holden of The New York Times found the film to be an entertaining "luminous Hollywood ghost story", and offered that if more experimental films were as entertaining, "the notion of a thriving avant-garde cinema might not be so intimidating to the moviegoing public."

== Awards and nominations ==
=== Accolades ===
List of awards and nominations
Event/Body	Year	Award	Recipient	Result	Ref.
L.A. Outfest	2003	Special Programming Committee Award for 'Outstanding Artistic Achievement'	The Decay of Fiction	Won	
San Francisco International Film Festival	2003	Golden Gate Persistence of Vision Award	The Decay of Fiction	Won	
Los Angeles Film Critics Association	2004	Independent/Experimental Film and Video Award	The Decay of Fiction	Won	
Film Society of Lincoln Center	2010	Best Avant-Garde Films & Videos 2000–2009	The Decay of Fiction	Tied for eleventh placing	

== See also ==
- List of film noir titles
