= American Splendor (film) =

2003 American biographical film about Harvey Pekar

- Theatrical release poster
- Directed by: Shari Springer Berman; Robert Pulcini
- Written by: Shari Springer Berman; Robert Pulcini
- Based on: American Splendor by Harvey Pekar; Our Cancer Year by; Harvey Pekar; Joyce Brabner
- Produced by: Ted Hope; Christine Kunewa Walker; Julia King; Declan Baldwin
- Starring: Paul Giamatti; Hope Davis; Judah Friedlander
- Cinematography: Terry Stacey
- Edited by: Robert Pulcini
- Music by: Mark Suozzo
- Production companies: HBO Films; Good Machine
- Distributed by: Fine Line Features
- Release dates: January 20, 2003 (Sundance); August 15, 2003 (United States)
- Running time: 101 minutes
- Country: United States
- Language: English
- Budget: $2 million
- Box office: $8.7 million

American Splendor is a 2003 American biographical comedy drama film written and directed by Shari Springer Berman and Robert Pulcini. The film, which chronicles the life of comic book writer Harvey Pekar, is a hybrid production featuring live actors, documentary, and animation. It is based on the 1976–2008 comic book series of the same name written by Pekar and the 1994 graphic novel Our Cancer Year written by Pekar and Joyce Brabner. The film stars Paul Giamatti as Pekar and Hope Davis as Brabner. It also features appearances from Pekar and Brabner themselves (along with Pekar's long-time co-worker Toby Radloff), who discuss their lives, the comic books, and how it feels to be depicted onscreen by actors.

The film was filmed entirely on location in Cleveland and Lakewood in Ohio. American Splendor premiered at the Sundance Film Festival on January 20, 2003, and was released in the United States on August 15, by Fine Line Features. The film received critical acclaim. It was nominated for Best Adapted Screenplay at the 76th Academy Awards.

== Plot ==
On Halloween 1950, 11-year-old Harvey Pekar refuses to dress up as a superhero for trick-or-treating. Years later, Harvey is seen walking the Cleveland streets, and the real Harvey Pekar appears in a documentary-style setup. In 1975, Harvey visits a throat doctor, exhibiting hypochondria. His wife mocks their lifestyle and leaves him. At his file clerk job at a VA hospital, Mr. Boats offers advice from an Elinor Wylie poem.

In a documentary scene, the real Harvey discusses his part-time used-record collecting/selling. Flashing back to 1962, Harvey meets shy illustrator Robert Crumb at a yard sale, bonding over jazz and comics. Returning to 1975, the now-famous Crumb visits Cleveland. Frustrated and single, Harvey has a sobering moment in the VA hospital's "deceased" files, leading him to write his own stories. Inspired by an incident at the supermarket, he stays up all night writing. At a diner, Harvey shows Crumb his comic scripts, and Crumb offers to illustrate them.

Harvey publishes eight issues of American Splendor to critical acclaim but little financial gain, remaining a file clerk. He reconnects with Alice Quinn, a former college acquaintance, and they discuss Theodore Dreiser's novel Jennie Gerhardt, but he leaves feeling lonelier.

Meanwhile, in Delaware, Joyce is frustrated with her partner in the comic book store, who has sold her copy of American Splendor No. 8. She begins corresponding with Harvey, who eagerly responds. They realize they are kindred spirits, and she travels to Cleveland to meet him. After a dinner date, Joyce becomes ill at his apartment, leading to Harvey's care. Joyce suggests they skip courtship and marry.

A week later, Harvey sees his colleague Toby Radloff eating in his car, heading to Toledo for a screening of Revenge of the Nerds. Harvey heads to Delaware to marry Joyce and help her move to Cleveland. The real Joyce Brabner discusses becoming a character in Harvey's stories.

Married, Harvey and Joyce attend Revenge of the Nerds with Toby, which Harvey finds insipid. Back at their apartment, Joyce complains about Harvey's possessions but their argument is interrupted by a theater producer wanting to adapt American Splendor into a play. After its Los Angeles debut, Harvey's success grows, complicated by Joyce's emotional struggles and desire for children. A producer offers Harvey a guest spot on Late Night with David Letterman. Harvey's appearances are a hit, and Toby becomes an MTV star.

In Cleveland, Harvey is recognized from Late Night, rather than American Splendor, which angers him. Joyce seeks fulfillment and travels to a peace conference without Harvey's permission. One night, Harvey discovers a lump on his groin.

With Joyce away, Harvey returns to Late Night wearing an "On Strike Against NBC" shirt, causing chaos. Joyce returns, discovers Harvey's lump, and he is diagnosed with lymphoma. She suggests making a comic book about it, but he resists. She enlists Fred, an artist, to illustrate the experience. Fred brings his daughter Danielle, whom Joyce adores. Harvey reluctantly agrees to participate and asks Fred to keep bringing Danielle.

Harvey's treatment is grueling. He questions if he is real or a comic character and ponders the story's end if he dies. Harvey dreams of other Harvey Pekars in the phone book. A year later, Harvey and Joyce sign the completed Our Cancer Year, and he is declared cancer-free. They adopt Danielle, and Harvey adjusts to parenthood. The real Harvey retires from the VA hospital, and the staff holds a retirement party where Joyce, Danielle, and Harvey embrace.

== Cast ==
- Paul Giamatti as Harvey Pekar
  - Daniel Tay as Young Harvey Pekar
  - Donal Logue as Stage Actor Harvey
- Hope Davis as Joyce Brabner
  - Molly Shannon as Stage Actor Joyce
- Judah Friedlander as Toby Radloff
- James Urbaniak as Robert Crumb
- Harvey Pekar as Himself
- Joyce Brabner as Herself
- Toby Radloff as Himself
- Earl Billings as Mr. Boats
- Maggie Moore as Alice Quinn
- James McCaffrey as Fred
- Madylin Sweeten as Danielle
- Gary Dumm (a long-time illustrator for American Splendor) as The Extra (in a suede jacket), who asks Pekar for his autograph in the Our Cancer Year book-signing scene
- Eytan Mirsky as The Guitarist
- Josh Hutcherson as Kid Dressed as Robin (his first feature film appearance)
- Chris Ambrose as Kid Dressed as Superman
- Shari Springer Berman (voice) as Interviewer
- Robert Pulcini as Bob, The Director

== Production ==
The film was originally intended to be screened on HBO. The script was written before the September 11 attacks, was cast right afterward, and shot in about a month in the fall of 2001.

Though Shari Springer Berman and Robert Pulcini had directed documentaries before, American Splendor was their first narrative feature. Of the film's alternating of fictional portrayals with real-life appearances by Pekar and his friends and family, co-writer/co-director Pulcini recalled,

"It really was the only way that made sense to tell that story because we were handed this stack of comic strips where the main character never really looks the same because he's drawn by so many different artists. We wondered how to stay true to the material, and that's the concept we came up with. The structure came out of that very naturally. It wasn't something that we labored over."

Berman added that upon meeting Pekar they felt compelled to include him in the film:

"We also got to know Harvey even before we wrote the screenplay. We actually went to Cleveland and spent time with Harvey and Joyce, and spoke to them on the phone a lot. Once we spent some time with both of them, we were like, 'Oh my God, we have to put them in the movie!' That was a case where we were still using our documentary instincts and had to figure out a way to include him in it that was a natural fit for the material."

Artwork from actual American Splendor comics and Our Cancer Year appears in the film; some scenes use artwork replicated by cartoonist Doug Allen. Animated sequences were produced by Gary Leib.

At one point, Pekar meta-references the structure of the film by doing a voice-over for a one-shot of Paul Giamatti playing him by saying "There's our guy. Well, it's me. Or the guy playing me. Though he don't look nothing like me, but whatever." (Pekar and Brabner had been approached previously by actors interested in playing Pekar on film, including Rob Schneider.)

David Letterman refused to appear in the film, and his old network of NBC did not allow the filmmakers to use footage of Pekar's disastrous fourth and sixth appearances on Late Night (aired July 31, 1987 and August 31, 1988, respectively), though they had no problems with the other Pekar appearances that are shown in the film. The supposed "final appearance" was done using oblique camera angles and a voiced-over audio of the incident. (In actuality, Pekar returned for two more appearances on the Letterman show in 1993 & 1994.)

The film's original production budget was $1.5 million, and as the film was coming together, HBO gave the filmmakers more money for post-production, animation, and music.

== Music ==
Mark Suozzo wrote the film's score.

Music played in the film mostly reflects Pekar's affection for avant-garde jazz and American music from the 1920s and 1930s. A couple of songs by American Splendor illustrator Robert Crumb and his band are also featured.

The American Splendor (Original Motion Picture Soundtrack) was released by New Line Records in 2003, and featured the following songs:

1. "Paniots Nine" — Joe Maneri
2. "Blue Devil Jump" — Jay McShann
3. "Chasin' Rainbows" — R. Crumb & His Cheap Suit Serenaders
4. "On the Sunny Side of the Street" — Lester Young with the Oscar Peterson Trio
5. "Oh, Lady Be Good!" — Dizzy Gillespie
6. "Ain't That Peculiar" — Marvin Gaye
7. "Looking Suite: The Shortest Weekend / After Alice (So Sweet, So Sad)" — Mark Suozzo/Global Stage Orchestra
8. "Stardust" — Dizzy Gillespie
9. "Hula Medley" — R. Crumb & His Cheap Suit Serenaders
10. "T'aint Nobody's Bizness If I Do" — Jay McShann
11. "My Favorite Things" — John Coltrane
12. "Time Passes Strangely: Cancer Treatment / Retirement Party" — Mark Suozzo
13. "Ain't That Peculiar" — Chocolate Genius

The following songs — in whole, or in part — are used diegetically in the film:

- "Soul Power" — Captain
- "Big Ed" — Mark Cherrie
- "Know Your Rights" — The Clash
- "Escape (The Piña Colada Song)" — Rupert Holmes
- "American Splendor" — Eytan Mirsky
- "Silent Morning" — Noel
- "All Black and White" — written by Clair Marlo & Alexander "Ace" Baker
- "I'll Be with You in Apple Blossom Time" — The Andrews Sisters
- "My City Was Gone" — The Pretenders

== Reception ==
On Rotten Tomatoes, the film has a 94% rating based on reviews from 186 critics, with an average rating of 8.3/10. The website's critical consensus reads, "Exhilarating both stylistically and for its entertaining, moving portrayal of an everyman, American Splendor is a portrait of a true underground original." On Metacritic, the film has a weighted average score of 90 out of 100, based on 42 reviews, indicating "universal acclaim".

Roger Ebert awarded the film four stars out of four in his review, calling it a "magnificently audacious movie, in which fact and fiction sometimes coexist in the same frame." He remarked "the casting of Giamatti and Davis is perfect", writing that they "mastered not only the looks but the feels and even the souls of these two people", as well as praising Friedlander's performance. He also found the film "delightful in the way it finds its own way to tell its own story", describing its presentation as "mesmerizing in the way it lures us into the daily hopes and fears of this Cleveland family."

American Splendor won the Grand Jury Prize for Dramatic Film at the 2003 Sundance Film Festival, in addition to the award for Best Adapted Screenplay from the Writers Guild of America. At the 2003 Cannes Film Festival, the film received the FIPRESCI critics award. American Splendor was given the Guardian New Directors Award at the 2003 Edinburgh International Film Festival. It was also nominated for Best Adapted Screenplay at the 2003 Academy Awards.

Columnist Jaime Wolf wrote a laudatory review of the film in Slate, also drawing attention to formal parallels with Woody Allen's Annie Hall and his other films.

Harvey Pekar wrote about the effects of the film in various stories published in American Splendor: Our Movie Year (2004).

== Accolades ==
Award	Category	Nominee(s)	Result	Ref.
Academy Awards	Best Adapted Screenplay	Pulcini and Springer Berman	Nominated	
American Film Institute Awards	Movie of the Year	American Splendor	Won	
Awards Circuit Community Awards	Best Adapted Screenplay	Springer Berman and Pulcini	Nominated	
Belgian Syndicate of Cinema Critics	Grand Prix	American Splendor	Nominated	
Boston Society of Film Critics	Best Screenplay	Pulcini and Springer Berman	Won	
Cannes Film Festival	FIPRESCI Prize (Un Certain Regard)	American Splendor	Won	
Central Ohio Film Critics Association	Best Screenplay, Adapted	Springer Berman and Pulcini	Won	
Central Ohio Film Critics Association	Best Supporting Actress	Hope Davis	Nominated	
Chicago Film Critics Association	Most Promising Filmmaker	Pulcini and Springer Berman	Won	
Chicago Film Critics Association	Best Actor	Paul Giamatti	Nominated	
Chicago Film Critics Association	Best Actress	Hope Davis	Nominated	
Chicago Film Critics Association	Best Film	American Splendor	Nominated	
Chicago Film Critics Association	Best Screenplay	Pulcini and Springer Berman	Nominated	
Chlotrudis Awards	Best Adapted Screenplay	Pulcini and Springer Berman	Won	
Chlotrudis Awards	Best Movie	American Splendor	Nominated	
Chlotrudis Awards	Best Director	Pulcini and Springer Berman	Nominated	
Chlotrudis Awards	Best Actor	Paul Giamatti	Nominated	
Chlotrudis Awards	Best Supporting Actress	Hope Davis	Nominated	
Dallas-Fort Worth Film Critics Association Awards	Russell Smith Award	Pulcini and Springer Berman	Won	
Dallas-Fort Worth Film Critics Association Awards	Best Actor	Paul Giamatti	Nominated	
Dallas-Fort Worth Film Critics Association Awards	Best Picture	American Splendor	Nominated	
Deauville American Film Festival	Critics Award (Prix de la Critique Internationale)	American Splendor	Won	
Deauville American Film Festival	Grand Special Prize	American Splendor	Nominated	
Edinburgh International Film Festival	Guardian New Directors Award	Pulcini and Springer Berman	Won	
Florida Film Critics Circle Awards	Pauline Kael Breakout Award	Pulcini and Springer Berman	Won	
Ghent International Film Festival	Grand Prix	American Splendor	Nominated	
Gijón International Film Festival	Best Feature	American Splendor	Nominated	
Gold Derby Awards	Adapted Screenplay	American Splendor	Nominated	
Golden Globe Awards	Best Supporting Actress – Motion Picture	Hope Davis	Nominated	
Golden Trailer Awards	Best Voice Over	Harvey Pekar	Nominated	
Gotham Awards	Breakthrough Director Award	Springer Berman and Pulcini	Won	
Independent Spirit Awards	Best Film	American Splendor	Nominated	
Independent Spirit Awards	Best Director	Pulcini and Springer Berman	Nominated	
Independent Spirit Awards	Best Male Lead	Paul Giamatti	Nominated	
Independent Spirit Awards	Best Supporting Male	Judah Friedlander	Nominated	
Independent Spirit Awards	Best Screenplay	Pulcini and Springer Berman	Nominated	
International Online Cinema Awards	Best Adapted Screenplay	Springer Berman and Pulcini	Nominated	
London Film Critics' Circle	Screenwriter of the Year	Springer Berman and Pulcini	Nominated	
Los Angeles Film Critics Association	Best Film	American Splendor	Won	
Los Angeles Film Critics Association	Best Screenplay	Pulcini and Springer Berman	Won	
Montréal Comedy Festival 'Just for Laughs'	Festival Prize	American Splendor	Won	
National Board of Review	Breakthrough Performance by an Actor	Paul Giamatti	Won	
National Board of Review	Special Recognition for Excellence in Filmmaking	Pulcini and Springer Berman	Won	
National Society of Film Critics	Best Film	American Splendor	Won	
National Society of Film Critics	Best Screenplay	Pulcini and Springer Berman	Won	
New York Film Critics Circle	Best Actress	Hope Davis	Won	
New York Film Critics Circle	Best First Film	American Splendor	Won	
Online Film & Television Association	Best Writing, Screenplay Based on Material from Another Medium	Springer Berman and Pulcini	Nominated	
Online Film & Television Association	Best First Screenplay	Springer Berman and Pulcini	Nominated	
Online Film & Television Association	Best Titles Sequence	American Splendor	Nominated	
Online Film Critics Society Awards	Best Breakthrough Filmmaker	Springer Berman and Pulcini	Won	
Online Film Critics Society Awards	Best Actor	Paul Giamatti	Nominated	
Online Film Critics Society Awards	Best Adapted Screenplay	Springer Berman and Pulcini	Nominated	
Phoenix Film Critics Society Awards	Best Performance by an Actor in a Leading Role	Paul Giamatti	Nominated	
Phoenix Film Critics Society Awards	Best Performance by an Actress in a Supporting Role	Hope Davis	Nominated	
Phoenix Film Critics Society Awards	Best Screenplay, Adapted	Pulcini and Springer Berman	Nominated	
Phoenix Film Critics Society Awards	Best Film Editing	Robert Pulcini	Nominated	
Phoenix Film Critics Society Awards	Best Use of Previously Published or Recorded Music	American Splendor	Nominated	
San Diego Film Critics Society Awards	Best Screenplay, Adapted	Springer Berman and Pulcini	Won	
São Paulo International Film Festival	Best Feature Film	American Splendor	Nominated	
Satellite Awards	Best Actor — Motion Picture Musical or Comedy	Paul Giamatti	Nominated	
Satellite Awards	Best Actress — Motion Picture Musical or Comedy	Hope Davis	Nominated	
Satellite Awards	Best Director	Pulcini and Springer Berman	Nominated	
Satellite Awards	Best Film — Musical or Comedy	American Splendor	Nominated	
Satellite Awards	Best Screenplay — Adapted	Pulcini and Springer Berman	Nominated	
Seattle Film Critics Awards	Best Picture	American Splendor	Won	
Seattle Film Critics Awards	Best Actress	Hope Davis	Won	
Seattle Film Critics Awards	Best Screenplay, Adapted	Springer Berman and Pulcini	Won	
Seattle Film Critics Awards	Best Actor	Paul Giamatti	Nominated	
Southeastern Film Critics Association Awards	Best Picture	American Splendor	Nominated	
Sundance Film Festival	Grand Jury Prize Dramatic	American Splendor	Won	
Toronto Film Critics Association Awards	Best First Feature	Springer Berman and Pulcini	Won	
Village Voice Film Poll	Best Screenplay	Springer Berman and Pulcini	Won	
Village Voice Film Poll	Best Film	American Splendor	Nominated	
Village Voice Film Poll	Best Performance	Paul Giamatti	Nominated	
Village Voice Film Poll	Best Supporting Performance	Hope Davis	Nominated	
Writers Guild of America Award	Best Screenplay — Adapted	Pulcini and Springer Berman	Won	

Awards
Preceded by Personal Velocity	Sundance Grand Jury Prize: U.S. Dramatic; 2003	Succeeded by Primer
